= Results of the 1986 Queensland state election =

Queensland state election, 1 November 1986 Legislative Assembly << 1983–1989 >>
Enrolled voters	1,563,294				
Votes cast	1,426,478		Turnout	91.25%	–0.44%
Informal votes	30,903		Informal	2.17%	+0.70%
Summary of votes by party
Party	Primary votes	%	Swing	Seats	Change
Labor	577,062	41.35%	–2.63%	30	–2
National	553,197	39.64%	+0.71%	49	+8
Liberal	230,310	16.50%	+1.62%	10	+2
Democrats	8,747	0.63%	–0.20%	0	±0
Independent	26,259	1.88%	+0.59%	0	–1
Total	1,395,575			89	

This is a list of electoral district results for the 1986 Queensland state election.

== Results by electoral district ==
=== Albert ===
1986 Queensland state election: Albert
Party	Candidate	Votes	%	±%
National	Ivan Gibbs	8,351	49.1	−7.4
Labor	Tom Harrison	5,446	32.0	−11.5
Liberal	Vince Camilleri	3,222	18.9	+18.9
Total formal votes		17,019	98.0	
Informal votes		345	2.0	
Turnout		17,364	90.4	
Two-party-preferred result
National	Ivan Gibbs	10,744	63.1	+4.3
Labor	Tom Harrison	6,275	36.9	−4.3
National hold		Swing	+4.3	

=== Archerfield ===
1986 Queensland state election: Archerfield
Party	Candidate	Votes	%	±%
Labor	Henry Palaszczuk	10,277	62.3	−9.3
National	Peter Jorgensen	3,513	21.3	−7.1
Liberal	John Shea	2,699	16.4	+16.4
Total formal votes		16,489	96.4	
Informal votes		622	3.6	
Turnout		17,111	90.7	
Two-party-preferred result
Labor	Henry Palaszczuk	11,031	66.9	−3.6
National	Peter Jorgensen	5,458	33.1	+3.6
Labor hold		Swing	−3.6	

=== Ashgrove ===
1986 Queensland state election: Ashgrove
Party	Candidate	Votes	%	±%
Labor	Tom Veivers	7,613	44.7	+2.3
Liberal	Alan Sherlock	4,511	26.5	+6.9
National	Francis Gaffy	4,453	26.2	−2.2
Democrats	Paul Wright	448	2.6	−7.0
Total formal votes		17,025	98.5	
Informal votes		258	1.5	
Turnout		17,283	91.2	
Two-party-preferred result
Liberal	Alan Sherlock	8,860	52.0	+4.6
Labor	Tom Veivers	8,165	48.0	−4.6
Liberal gain from Labor		Swing	+4.6	

=== Aspley ===
1986 Queensland state election: Aspley
Party	Candidate	Votes	%	±%
Labor	Joe Marney	6,676	35.7	+1.6
National	Beryce Nelson	5,867	31.3	−5.8
Liberal	Scott McLeay	5,493	29.3	+0.4
Independent	Patrick Blake	681	3.6	+3.6
Total formal votes		18,717	98.3	
Informal votes		316	1.7	
Turnout		19,033	93.2	
Two-party-preferred result
National	Beryce Nelson	10,127	54.1	−1.9
Labor	Joe Marney	8,590	45.9	+1.9
National hold		Swing	−1.9	

=== Auburn ===
1986 Queensland state election: Auburn
Party	Candidate	Votes	%	±%
National	Neville Harper	8,252	64.0	−3.2
Labor	Tom Hall	4,634	36.0	+3.2
Total formal votes		12,886	98.0	
Informal votes		268	2.0	
Turnout		13,154	92.8	
National hold		Swing	−3.2	

=== Balonne ===
1986 Queensland state election: Balonne
Party	Candidate	Votes	%	±%
National	Don Neal	5,350	74.1	−0.7
Labor	Elwyn Brookes	1,872	25.9	+0.7
Total formal votes		7,222	97.6	
Informal votes		180	2.4	
Turnout		7,402	91.3	
National hold		Swing	−0.7	

=== Barambah ===
1986 Queensland state election: Barambah
Party	Candidate	Votes	%	±%
National	Joh Bjelke-Petersen	9,114	77.5	−1.0
Labor	James Horton	2,651	22.5	+1.0
Total formal votes		11,765	97.3	−0.6
Informal votes		330	2.7	+0.6
Turnout		12,095	93.5	−0.2
National hold		Swing	−1.0	

==== By-election ====
- This by-election was caused by the resignation of Joh Bjelke-Petersen. It was held on 16 April 1988.

1988 Barambah state by-election
Party	Candidate	Votes	%	±%
National	Warren Truss	4,754	41.27	−36.20
Citizens Electoral Council	Trevor Perrett	3,639	31.59	+31.59
Labor	John Lang	2,033	17.65	−4.88
New Country Party	Kevin Polzin	1,092	9.48	+9.48
Total formal votes		11,518	98.15	+0.88
Informal votes		216	1.85	−0.88
Turnout		11,734	84.90	−8.63
Two-candidate-preferred result
Citizens Electoral Council	Trevor Perrett	6,232	54.11	+54.11
National	Warren Truss	5,286	45.89	−31.58
Citizens Electoral Council gain from National		Swing	N/A	

=== Barron River ===
1986 Queensland state election: Barron River
Party	Candidate	Votes	%	±%
National	Martin Tenni	7,990	54.0	−1.1
Labor	Terry Doyle	6,795	46.0	+1.1
Total formal votes		14,785	97.6	
Informal votes		366	2.4	
Turnout		15,151	88.8	
National hold		Swing	−1.1	

=== Bowen ===
1986 Queensland state election: Bowen
Party	Candidate	Votes	%	±%
Labor	Ken Smyth	6,274	57.0	
National	Jim Turner	2,892	26.3	
Liberal	Jeanette Hunter	1,836	16.7	
Total formal votes		11,002	98.3	
Informal votes		195	1.7	
Turnout		11,197	92.0	
Two-party-preferred result
Labor	Ken Smyth	6,869	62.5	+4.9
National	Jim Turner	4,127	37.5	−4.9
Labor hold		Swing	+4.9	

=== Brisbane Central ===
1986 Queensland state election: Brisbane Central
Party	Candidate	Votes	%	±%
Labor	Brian Davis	7,894	50.2	−8.7
National	Peter Peters	3,899	24.8	+24.8
Liberal	Muriel Ward	2,955	18.8	−22.3
Independent	Anthony Kneipp	405	2.6	+2.6
Socialist	Jack Cotter	401	2.6	+2.6
Independent	Mark Gardener	181	1.2	+1.2
Total formal votes		15,735	95.7	
Informal votes		710	4.3	
Turnout		16,445	85.6	
Two-party-preferred result
Labor	Brian Davis	9,299	59.1	−0.6
National	Peter Peters	6,436	40.9	+40.9
Labor hold		Swing	−0.6	

=== Broadsound ===
1986 Queensland state election: Broadsound
Party	Candidate	Votes	%	±%
National	Denis Hinton	4,991	42.2	
Labor	Chris Palmer	4,419	37.4	
Independent	Barbara Wildin	1,727	14.6	
Independent	Ros Scott	683	5.6	
Total formal votes		11,820	98.0	
Informal votes		242	2.0	
Turnout		12,062	91.5	
Two-party-preferred result
National	Denis Hinton	6,142	52.0	−7.3
Labor	Chris Palmer	5,678	48.0	+7.3
National hold		Swing	−7.3	

=== Bulimba ===
1986 Queensland state election: Bulimba
Party	Candidate	Votes	%	±%
Labor	Ron McLean	10,486	58.2	+1.5
National	Judith Brown	4,413	24.5	−4.4
Liberal	Alan Bavister	3,125	17.3	+3.1
Total formal votes		18,024	98.1	
Informal votes		355	1.9	
Turnout		18,379	91.0	
Two-party-preferred result
Labor	Ron McLean	11,355	63.0	−3.0
National	Judith Brown	6,669	37.0	+3.0
Labor hold		Swing	−3.0	

=== Bundaberg ===
1986 Queensland state election: Bundaberg
Party	Candidate	Votes	%	±%
Labor	Clem Campbell	9,223	53.9	+1.9
National	Heather Galley	6,977	40.7	−0.8
Independent	Alex Warren	928	5.4	−1.1
Total formal votes		17,128	98.3	
Informal votes		290	1.7	
Turnout		17,418	93.0	
Two-party-preferred result
Labor	Clem Campbell	9,694	56.6	+2.3
National	Heather Galley	7,434	43.4	−2.3
Labor hold		Swing	+2.3	

=== Burdekin ===
1986 Queensland state election: Burdekin
Party	Candidate	Votes	%	±%
National	Mark Stoneman	6,570	52.6	+5.2
Labor	Richard Tucker	4,163	33.3	−6.6
Liberal	Colin Jackson	1,295	10.4	−1.8
Independent	Laurence Fabrellas	457	3.7	+3.7
Total formal votes		12,485	98.2	
Informal votes		231	1.8	
Turnout		12,716	93.5	
Two-party-preferred result
National	Mark Stoneman	7,728	61.9	+5.5
Labor	Richard Tucker	4,757	38.1	−5.5
National hold		Swing	+5.5	

=== Burnett ===
1986 Queensland state election: Burnett
Party	Candidate	Votes	%	±%
National	Doug Slack	8,165	65.1	−0.2
Labor	Robin Webcke	4,378	34.9	+0.2
Total formal votes		12,543	97.8	
Informal votes		277	2.2	
Turnout		12,820	93.1	
National hold		Swing	−0.2	

=== Caboolture ===
1986 Queensland state election: Caboolture
Party	Candidate	Votes	%	±%
Labor	Ken Hayward	9,956	53.7	
National	Ron Grant	8,572	46.3	
Total formal votes		18,528	95.5	
Informal votes		870	4.5	
Turnout		19,398	92.0	
Labor gain from National		Swing	+1.0	

- The redistribution of electoral boundaries before the election made Caboolture a notionally Labor seat. The Nationals did not regain it.

=== Cairns ===
1986 Queensland state election: Cairns
Party	Candidate	Votes	%	±%
Labor	Keith De Lacy	8,340	56.2	+5.6
National	Terry Adair	6,492	43.8	+1.8
Total formal votes		14,832	96.7	
Informal votes		500	3.3	
Turnout		15,332	87.6	
Labor hold		Swing	+3.3	

=== Callide ===
1986 Queensland state election: Callide
Party	Candidate	Votes	%	±%
National	Di McCauley	5,950	49.9	+10.6
Labor	Nick Kofoed	3,462	29.0	+3.7
Independent	Barry James	1,496	12.6	+12.6
Liberal	Geoffrey Clarke	1,013	8.5	+8.5
Total formal votes		11,921	98.5	
Informal votes		185	1.5	
Turnout		12,106	91.6	
Two-party-preferred result
National	Di McCauley	7,534	63.2	+22.5
Labor	Nick Kofoed	4,387	36.8	+36.8
National gain from Independent		Swing	+22.5	

=== Carnarvon ===
1986 Queensland state election: Carnarvon
Party	Candidate	Votes	%	±%
National	Peter McKechnie	7,210	67.1	+2.4
Labor	Paul Lucas	3,529	32.9	−2.4
Total formal votes		10,739	97.3	
Informal votes		297	2.7	
Turnout		11,036	92.0	
National hold		Swing	+2.4	

=== Chatsworth ===
1986 Queensland state election: Chatsworth
Party	Candidate	Votes	%	±%
Labor	Terry Mackenroth	9,990	52.8	−4.8
National	Greg Jones	4,921	26.0	+26.0
Liberal	Ian Chandler	4,018	21.2	−21.2
Total formal votes		18,929	98.1	
Informal votes		364	1.9	
Turnout		19,293	93.2	
Two-party-preferred result
Labor	Terry Mackenroth	10,840	57.3	−0.3
National	Greg Jones	8,089	42.7	+42.7
Labor hold		Swing	−0.3	

=== Condamine ===
1986 Queensland state election: Condamine
Party	Candidate	Votes	%	±%
National	Brian Littleproud	9,479	78.5	+10.6
Labor	Gordon Zigenbine	2,598	21.5	+1.2
Total formal votes		12,077	97.8	
Informal votes		272	2.2	
Turnout		12,349	93.9	
National hold		Swing	+1.8	

=== Cook ===
1986 Queensland state election: Cook
Party	Candidate	Votes	%	±%
Labor	Bob Scott	5,629	66.7	+1.3
National	Getano Lui	2,816	33.3	−1.3
Total formal votes		8,445	95.8	
Informal votes		372	4.2	
Turnout		8,817	82.3	
Labor hold		Swing	+1.3	

=== Cooroora ===
1986 Queensland state election: Cooroora
Party	Candidate	Votes	%	±%
National	Gordon Simpson	9,163	49.4	−8.1
Labor	Brian Payler	5,799	31.3	−2.0
Liberal	Wehl Wansley	2,706	14.6	+14.6
Democrats	John Boultbee	871	4.7	−2.4
Total formal votes		18,539	98.5	
Informal votes		277	1.5	
Turnout		18,816	89.3	
Two-party-preferred result
National	Gordon Simpson	11,242	60.6	−1.0
Labor	Brian Payler	7,297	39.4	+1.0
National hold		Swing	−1.0	

=== Cunningham ===
1986 Queensland state election: Cunningham
Party	Candidate	Votes	%	±%
National	Tony Elliott	10,321	79.9	+1.7
Labor	Paul Kerswell	2,589	20.1	−1.7
Total formal votes		12,910	97.4	
Informal votes		348	2.6	
Turnout		13,258	92.7	
National hold		Swing	+1.7	

=== Currumbin ===
1986 Queensland state election: Currumbin
Party	Candidate	Votes	%	±%
National	Leo Gately	6,930	39.8	
Labor	Noel Elliot	5,854	33.6	
Liberal	Robert Freebairn	2,413	13.8	
Independent	Trevor Coomber	1,882	10.8	
Democrats	Yvonne Stoelhorst	338	1.9	
Total formal votes		17,417	97.8	
Informal votes		391	2.2	
Turnout		17,808	88.9	
Two-party-preferred result
National	Leo Gately	10,255	58.9	+2.6
Labor	Noel Elliot	7,162	41.1	−2.6
National hold		Swing	+2.6	

=== Everton ===
1986 Queensland state election: Everton
Party	Candidate	Votes	%	±%
Labor	Glen Milliner	8,765	49.4	−3.4
Liberal	Greg Smith	4,940	27.9	+11.6
National	Richard Jackson	4,023	22.7	−8.2
Total formal votes		17,728	98.6	
Informal votes		257	1.4	
Turnout		17,985	93.3	
Two-party-preferred result
Labor	Glen Milliner	9,122	51.5	−2.8
Liberal	Greg Smith	8,606	48.5	+48.5
Labor hold		Swing	−2.8	

=== Fassifern ===
1986 Queensland state election: Fassifern
Party	Candidate	Votes	%	±%
National	Kev Lingard	9,776	51.3	
Labor	Jim Egan	5,928	31.1	
Liberal	Margaret Grevett	3,364	17.6	
Total formal votes		19,068	98.1	
Informal votes		362	1.9	
Turnout		19,430	92.2	
Two-party-preferred result
National	Kev Lingard	12,030	63.1	−1.9
Labor	Jim Egan	7,023	36.9	+1.9
National hold		Swing	−1.9	

=== Flinders ===
1986 Queensland state election: Flinders
Party	Candidate	Votes	%	±%
National	Bob Katter	5,484	60.8	+9.0
Labor	Alex Wilson	3,529	39.2	−2.2
Total formal votes		9,013	97.3	
Informal votes		246	2.7	
Turnout		9,259	90.0	
National hold		Swing	+2.9	

=== Glass House ===
1986 Queensland state election: Glass House
Party	Candidate	Votes	%	±%
National	Bill Newton	8,563	46.6	
Labor	Lloyd Barr	6,875	37.4	
Liberal	Ernie McEntee	2,334	12.7	
Democrats	Glen Spicer	596	3.2	
Total formal votes		18,368	96.9	
Informal votes		583	3.1	
Turnout		18,951	92.2	
Two-party-preferred result
National	Bill Newton	10,456	56.9	+0.9
Labor	Lloyd Barr	7,912	43.1	−0.9
National hold		Swing	+0.9	

=== Greenslopes ===
1986 Queensland state election: Greenslopes
Party	Candidate	Votes	%	±%
Labor	Fred Wright	6,772	36.5	−4.3
National	Leisha Harvey	6,026	32.5	+1.4
Liberal	Bill Hewitt	5,233	28.2	+0.1
Independent	Ron Smith	508	2.7	+2.7
Total formal votes		18,539	98.3	
Informal votes		316	1.7	
Turnout		18,855	92.3	
Two-party-preferred result
National	Leisha Harvey	10,053	54.2	+1.3
Labor	Fred Wright	8,486	45.8	−1.3
National hold		Swing	+1.3	

=== Gregory ===
1986 Queensland state election: Gregory
Party	Candidate	Votes	%	±%
National	Bill Glasson	4,370	63.5	+0.9
Labor	Kevin Alexander	2,514	36.5	−0.9
Total formal votes		6,884	97.3	
Informal votes		188	2.7	
Turnout		7,072	88.4	
National hold		Swing	+0.9	

=== Gympie ===
1986 Queensland state election: Gympie
Party	Candidate	Votes	%	±%
National	Len Stephan	7,830	57.4	−7.1
Labor	Sven Condon	4,404	32.3	−3.2
Liberal	Bruce Kean	1,415	10.4	+10.4
Total formal votes		13,649	98.5	
Informal votes		211	1.5	
Turnout		13,860	93.0	
Two-party-preferred result
National	Len Stephan	8,845	64.8	+0.3
Labor	Sven Condon	4,804	35.2	−0.3
National hold		Swing	+0.3	

=== Hinchinbrook ===
1986 Queensland state election: Hinchinbrook
Party	Candidate	Votes	%	±%
National	Ted Row	5,705	47.6	+0.5
Labor	Allan Vitale	4,693	39.1	−1.8
Liberal	John Williams	1,390	11.6	−0.4
Independent	Ron Dunn	209	1.7	+1.7
Total formal votes		11,997	97.9	
Informal votes		252	2.1	
Turnout		12,249	93.0	
Two-party-preferred result
National	Ted Row	6,832	56.9	+1.1
Labor	Allan Vitale	5,165	43.1	−1.1
National hold		Swing	+1.1	

=== Ipswich ===
1986 Queensland state election: Ipswich
Party	Candidate	Votes	%	±%
Labor	David Hamill	10,740	58.8	+4.3
National	Michael Byrnes	4,294	23.5	+0.2
Liberal	Janice Akroyd	3,243	17.7	−3.6
Total formal votes		18,277	98.0	
Informal votes		369	2.0	
Turnout		18,646	92.8	
Two-party-preferred result
Labor	David Hamill	11,642	63.7	+3.0
National	Michael Byrnes	6,635	36.3	−3.0
Labor hold		Swing	+3.0	

=== Ipswich West ===
1986 Queensland state election: Ipswich West
Party	Candidate	Votes	%	±%
Labor	David Underwood	10,269	56.2	+0.5
National	Neil Russell	4,755	26.0	−4.2
Liberal	Ken Clift	3,247	17.8	+5.5
Total formal votes		18,271	97.9	
Informal votes		399	2.1	
Turnout		18,670	90.1	
Two-party-preferred result
Labor	David Underwood	11,182	61.2	+2.3
National	Neil Russell	7,089	38.8	−2.3
Labor hold		Swing	+2.3	

=== Isis ===
1986 Queensland state election: Isis
Party	Candidate	Votes	%	±%
National	Lin Powell	9,289	52.7	−5.0
Labor	Bill Nunn	6,772	38.4	−3.9
Independent	William Elson-Green	873	4.9	+4.9
Independent	Camillo Primavera	426	2.4	+2.4
Independent	Kevin Hendstock	273	1.5	+1.5
Total formal votes		17,633	98.1	
Informal votes		333	1.9	
Turnout		17,966	92.0	
Two-party-preferred result
National	Lin Powell	10,121	57.4	−0.3
Labor	Bill Nunn	7,512	42.6	+0.3
National hold		Swing	−0.3	

=== Landsborough ===
1986 Queensland state election: Landsborough
Party	Candidate	Votes	%	±%
National	Mike Ahern	9,594	50.0	−6.6
Labor	Michael Cramb	6,285	32.8	+1.3
Liberal	John McCaw	3,311	17.2	+17.2
Total formal votes		19,190	98.1	
Informal votes		361	1.9	
Turnout		19,551	90.0	
Two-party-preferred result
National	Mike Ahern	11,813	61.6	−1.2
Labor	Michael Cramb	7,375	38.4	+1.2
National hold		Swing	−1.2	

=== Lockyer ===
1986 Queensland state election: Lockyer
Party	Candidate	Votes	%	±%
National	Tony FitzGerald	10,918	61.3	−0.3
Labor	Jack Phelan	3,490	19.6	−2.7
Liberal	Fabius Manners	3,407	19.1	+3.0
Total formal votes		17,815	98.6	
Informal votes		255	1.4	
Turnout		18,070	92.9	
Two-party-preferred result
National	Tony FitzGerald	13,379	75.1	+0.6
Labor	Jack Phelan	4,436	24.9	−0.6
National hold		Swing	+0.6	

=== Logan ===
1986 Queensland state election: Logan
Party	Candidate	Votes	%	±%
Labor	Wayne Goss	9,693	51.7	
National	Wendy Howard	6,038	32.2	
Liberal	Allen Johnstone	2,746	14.7	
Socialist	Heather Haub	258	1.4	
Total formal votes		18,735	97.4	
Informal votes		509	2.6	
Turnout		19,244	88.5	
Two-party-preferred result
Labor	Wayne Goss	10,641	56.8	+5.5
National	Wendy Howard	8,094	43.2	−5.5
Labor hold		Swing	+5.5	

=== Lytton ===
1986 Queensland state election: Lytton
Party	Candidate	Votes	%	±%
Labor	Tom Burns	11,472	62.5	−8.9
National	Liz Upton	4,382	23.9	+23.9
Liberal	Daryl Mercer	2,503	13.6	−15.0
Total formal votes		18,357	98.0	
Informal votes		369	2.0	
Turnout		18,726	92.4	
Two-party-preferred result
Labor	Tom Burns	12,171	66.3	+3.2
National	Liz Upton	6,186	33.7	+33.7
Labor hold		Swing	+3.2	

=== Mackay ===
1986 Queensland state election: Mackay
Party	Candidate	Votes	%	±%
Labor	Ed Casey	7,830	51.5	−4.5
National	Greg Williamson	6,211	40.9	−3.1
Liberal	Charles Camilleri	1,162	7.6	+7.6
Total formal votes		15,203	98.6	
Informal votes		210	1.4	
Turnout		15,413	90.9	
Two-party-preferred result
Labor	Ed Casey	8,149	53.6	−1.5
National	Greg Williamson	7,054	46.4	+1.5
Labor hold		Swing	−1.5	

=== Manly ===
1986 Queensland state election: Manly
Party	Candidate	Votes	%	±%
Labor	Eric Shaw	10,647	51.0	
National	Merv Hoppner	5,928	28.4	
Liberal	Des Morris	4,309	20.6	
Total formal votes		20,884	98.1	
Informal votes		412	1.9	
Turnout		21,296	92.7	
Two-party-preferred result
Labor	Eric Shaw	11,841	56.7	+4.2
National	Merv Hoppner	9,043	43.3	−4.2
Labor hold		Swing	+4.2	

=== Mansfield ===
1986 Queensland state election: Mansfield
Party	Candidate	Votes	%	±%
Labor	Nicole Stehn	6,826	37.4	−1.5
National	Craig Sherrin	6,648	36.4	−3.6
Liberal	Leo White	4,774	26.2	+6.1
Total formal votes		18,248	97.9	
Informal votes		385	2.1	
Turnout		18,633	93.1	
Two-party-preferred result
National	Craig Sherrin	10,126	55.5	+0.4
Labor	Nicole Stehn	8,122	44.5	−0.4
National hold		Swing	+0.4	

=== Maryborough ===
1986 Queensland state election: Maryborough
Party	Candidate	Votes	%	±%
National	Gilbert Alison	8,738	50.7	+6.4
Labor	Peter Nightingale	8,484	49.3	+1.3
Total formal votes		17,222	97.9	
Informal votes		369	2.1	
Turnout		17,591	94.8	
National hold		Swing	−0.7	

=== Merthyr ===
1986 Queensland state election: Merthyr
Party	Candidate	Votes	%	±%
National	Don Lane	5,553	32.8	+7.2
Labor	Garrett Purtill	5,507	32.5	−8.1
Liberal	Santo Santoro	5,439	32.1	−0.4
Democrats	Bernard O'Malley	298	1.8	+1.8
Socialist Workers	Maurice Sibelle	149	0.9	+0.9
Total formal votes		16,946	96.9	
Informal votes		544	3.1	
Turnout		17,490	89.3	
Two-party-preferred result
National	Don Lane	9,497	56.0	−3.8
Labor	Garrett Purtill	7,449	44.0	+3.8
National gain from Liberal		Swing	N/A	

==== By-election ====
- This by-election was caused by the resignation of Don Lane. It was held on 13 May 1989.

1989 Merthyr state by-election
Party	Candidate	Votes	%	±%
Liberal	Santo Santoro	6,170	35.91	+3.82
Labor	Barbara Dawson	5,623	32.73	+0.23
National	Betty Byrne-Henderson	2,753	16.02	–16.74
Independent	Nigel Powell	1,281	7.46	+7.46
Independent	Tanya Wilde	540	3.14	+3.14
Democrats	John Brown	443	2.58	+0.82
Independent	Gerry Bellino	334	1.94	+1.94
Independent	I. Ciadamidaro	36	0.21	+0.21
Total formal votes		17,180	95.29	–1.60
Informal votes		848	4.71	+1.60
Turnout		18,028	78.92	−10.35
Two-party-preferred result
Liberal	Santo Santoro	9,784	56.95	N/A
Labor	Barbara Dawson	7,396	43.05	N/A
Liberal gain from National		Swing	N/A	

=== Mirani ===
1986 Queensland state election: Mirani
Party	Candidate	Votes	%	±%
National	Jim Randell	6,781	58.3	−0.1
Labor	Jeff Gascoyne	4,853	41.7	+0.1
Total formal votes		11,634	98.2	
Informal votes		211	1.8	
Turnout		11,845	92.6	
National hold		Swing	−0.1	

=== Moggill ===
1986 Queensland state election: Moggill
Party	Candidate	Votes	%	±%
Liberal	Bill Lickiss	7,082	42.2	
National	Douglas Mactaggart	5,070	30.2	
Labor	Harry Thornton	3,899	23.2	
Democrats	Geoffrey Fawthrop	735	4.4	
Total formal votes		16,786	98.7	
Informal votes		214	1.3	
Turnout		17,000	92.2	
Two-party-preferred result
Liberal	Bill Lickiss	11,868	70.7	+2.9
Labor	Harry Thornton	4,918	29.3	−2.9
Two-candidate-preferred result
Liberal	Bill Lickiss	11,428	68.1	
National	Douglas Mactaggart	5,358	31.9	
Liberal hold		Swing	N/A	

=== Mount Coot-tha ===
1986 Queensland state election: Mount Coot-tha
Party	Candidate	Votes	%	±%
Labor	John Moran	6,406	39.1	+16.0
Liberal	Lyle Schuntner	4,917	30.0	+3.1
National	Geoff Colless	4,353	26.6	−6.3
Democrats	John Elfick	691	4.2	−12.9
Total formal votes		16,367	98.1	
Informal votes		309	1.9	
Turnout		16,676	91.6	
Two-party-preferred result
Liberal	Lyle Schuntner	9,199	56.2	+1.0
Labor	John Moran	7,168	43.8	−1.0
Liberal hold		Swing	+1.0	

=== Mount Gravatt ===
1986 Queensland state election: Mount Gravatt
Party	Candidate	Votes	%	±%
Labor	Pauline McLaughlin	6,232	33.6	−2.2
National	Ian Henderson	6,226	33.6	−0.5
Liberal	Guelfi Scassola	5,879	31.7	+1.6
Tory and Whig	Christine Shackleton	187	1.0	+1.0
Total formal votes		18,524	97.9	
Informal votes		404	2.1	
Turnout		18,928	92.9	
Two-party-preferred result
National	Ian Henderson	10,502	56.7	+0.4
Labor	Pauline McLaughlin	8,022	43.3	−0.4
National hold		Swing	+0.4	

=== Mount Isa ===
1986 Queensland state election: Mount Isa
Party	Candidate	Votes	%	±%
Labor	Bill Price	4,677	45.5	−6.0
Liberal	Peter Beard	3,197	31.1	+31.1
National	Lilian Miller	2,409	23.4	−22.5
Total formal votes		10,283	97.8	
Informal votes		236	2.2	
Turnout		10,519	88.9	
Two-party-preferred result
Liberal	Peter Beard	5,423	52.7	+52.7
Labor	Bill Price	4,860	47.3	−4.4
Liberal gain from Labor		Swing	+4.4	

=== Mourilyan ===
1986 Queensland state election: Mourilyan
Party	Candidate	Votes	%	±%
Labor	Bill Eaton	5,894	51.0	−1.1
National	Malcolm Taylor	4,376	37.8	−8.9
Liberal	Andrea Walduck	1,295	11.2	+11.2
Total formal votes		11,565	98.6	
Informal votes		158	1.4	
Turnout		11,723	90.0	
Two-party-preferred result
Labor	Bill Eaton	6,257	54.1	+2.0
National	Malcolm Taylor	5,308	45.9	−2.0
Labor hold		Swing	+2.0	

=== Mulgrave ===
1986 Queensland state election: Mulgrave
Party	Candidate	Votes	%	±%
National	Max Menzel	5,286	43.0	−13.1
Labor	Warren Pitt	5,030	41.0	−0.2
Liberal	Andrew Rankine	1,963	16.0	+16.0
Total formal votes		12,279	98.3	
Informal votes		210	1.7	
Turnout		12,489	91.6	
Two-party-preferred result
National	Max Menzel	6,595	53.7	−0.2
Labor	Warren Pitt	5,684	46.3	+0.2
National hold		Swing	−0.2	

=== Murrumba ===
1986 Queensland state election: Murrumba
Party	Candidate	Votes	%	±%
Labor	Dean Wells	7,553	43.3	−7.6
National	Leslie Fletcher	4,558	26.1	−4.0
Liberal	Jenny Roberts	2,905	16.7	−2.3
Independent	Joe Kruger	2,419	13.9	+13.9
Total formal votes		17,435	98.1	
Informal votes		343	1.9	
Turnout		17,778	93.2	
Two-party-preferred result
Labor	Dean Wells	9,669	55.5	+0.4
National	Leslie Fletcher	7,766	44.5	−0.4
Labor hold		Swing	+0.4	

=== Nerang ===
1986 Queensland state election: Nerang
Party	Candidate	Votes	%	±%
National	Tom Hynd	7,509	43.8	
Labor	Marjorie Thompson	5,625	32.8	
Liberal	Russell Stuart	3,079	18.0	
Democrats	Tony Kennedy	625	3.7	
Independent	Methven Sparks	291	1.7	
Total formal votes		17,129	97.2	
Informal votes		497	2.8	
Turnout		17,626	88.3	
Two-party-preferred result
National	Tom Hynd	10,256	59.9	+3.3
Labor	Marjorie Thompson	6,873	40.1	−3.3
National hold		Swing	+3.3	

=== Nicklin ===
1986 Queensland state election: Nicklin
Party	Candidate	Votes	%	±%
National	Brian Austin	9,745	48.2	
Labor	Ian Matthews	5,833	28.8	
Liberal	Geoffrey Malcolm	3,807	18.8	
Democrats	Barbara Camplin	850	4.2	
Total formal votes		20,235	98.5	
Informal votes		312	1.5	
Turnout		20,547	90.0	
Two-party-preferred result
National	Brian Austin	12,329	60.9	−5.5
Labor	Ian Matthews	7,906	39.1	+5.5
National hold		Swing	−5.5	

=== Nudgee ===
1986 Queensland state election: Nudgee
Party	Candidate	Votes	%	±%
Labor	Ken Vaughan	9,849	58.1	−4.3
National	Reginald Rofe	4,041	23.8	+23.8
Liberal	Peter Hull	3,069	18.1	−19.5
Total formal votes		16,959	98.0	
Informal votes		349	2.0	
Turnout		17,308	94.0	
Two-party-preferred result
Labor	Ken Vaughan	10,701	63.1	+2.1
National	Reginald Rofe	6,258	36.9	+36.9
Labor hold		Swing	+2.1	

=== Nundah ===
1986 Queensland state election: Nundah
Party	Candidate	Votes	%	±%
Labor	Gary Johns	7,627	43.5	−2.8
Liberal	William Knox	5,894	33.7	−20.0
National	Goodwin Poole	3,996	22.8	+22.8
Total formal votes		17,517	98.2	
Informal votes		316	1.8	
Turnout		17,833	92.1	
Two-party-preferred result
Liberal	William Knox	9,702	55.4	+1.7
Labor	Gary Johns	7,815	44.6	−1.7
Liberal hold		Swing	+1.7	

=== Peak Downs ===
1986 Queensland state election: Peak Downs
Party	Candidate	Votes	%	±%
National	Vince Lester	4,994	64.6	−5.4
Labor	Albert Holzapfel	2,361	30.5	+0.7
Independent	Vrettos Cominos	375	4.9	+4.9
Total formal votes		7,730	98.7	
Informal votes		103	1.3	
Turnout		7,833	90.6	
Two-party-preferred result
National	Vince Lester	5,179	67.0	−3.9
Labor	Albert Holzapfel	2,551	33.0	+3.9
National hold		Swing	−3.9	

=== Pine Rivers ===
1986 Queensland state election: Pine Rivers
Party	Candidate	Votes	%	±%
Labor	Daniel O'Connell	6,579	37.2	−7.2
National	Yvonne Chapman	6,059	34.2	+3.7
Liberal	Rob Akers	4,664	26.4	+1.3
Democrats	Isobel Robinson	400	2.3	+2.3
Total formal votes		17,702	98.1	
Informal votes		339	1.9	
Turnout		18,041	93.7	
Two-party-preferred result
National	Yvonne Chapman	9,479	53.6	−1.1
Labor	Daniel O'Connell	8,223	46.4	+1.1
National hold		Swing	−1.1	

=== Port Curtis ===
1986 Queensland state election: Port Curtis
Party	Candidate	Votes	%	±%
Labor	Bill Prest	7,142	53.8	+2.8
National	Colin Brown	5,566	42.0	−1.7
Independent	Kevin Meyrick	556	4.2	+4.2
Total formal votes		13,264	98.3	
Informal votes		231	1.7	
Turnout		13,495	92.0	
Two-party-preferred result
Labor	Bill Prest	7,415	55.9	−0.6
National	Colin Brown	5,849	44.1	+0.6
Labor hold		Swing	−0.6	

=== Redcliffe ===
1986 Queensland state election: Redcliffe
Party	Candidate	Votes	%	±%
Labor	Peter Houston	7,193	40.6	−4.4
Liberal	Terry White	6,680	37.7	−17.3
National	Richard Procter	3,598	20.3	+20.3
Independent	Murray Rutherford	257	1.5	+1.5
Total formal votes		17,728	98.3	
Informal votes		311	1.7	
Turnout		18,039	92.4	
Two-party-preferred result
Liberal	Terry White	10,230	57.7	+2.7
Labor	Peter Houston	7,498	42.3	−2.7
Liberal hold		Swing	+2.7	

=== Redlands ===
1986 Queensland state election: Redlands
Party	Candidate	Votes	%	±%
National	Paul Clauson	7,716	41.6	−4.4
Labor	Graeme Kinnear	7,367	39.8	−1.6
Liberal	Martin Shepherd	2,918	15.8	+9.6
Democrats	Richard May	530	2.9	−3.5
Total formal votes		18,531	98.4	
Informal votes		297	1.6	
Turnout		18,828	92.8	
Two-party-preferred result
National	Paul Clauson	9,975	53.8	−5.0
Labor	Graeme Kinnear	8,556	46.2	+5.0
National hold		Swing	−5.0	

=== Rockhampton ===
1986 Queensland state election: Rockhampton
Party	Candidate	Votes	%	±%
Labor	Paul Braddy	8,838	55.9	−1.3
National	Dennis Stevenson	6,234	39.4	+14.5
Independent	Carl Hatte	751	4.8	+4.8
Total formal votes		15,823	98.2	
Informal votes		292	1.8	
Turnout		16,115	93.9	
Two-party-preferred result
Labor	Paul Braddy	9,209	58.2	−2.9
National	Dennis Stevenson	6,614	41.8	+2.9
Labor hold		Swing	−2.9	

=== Rockhampton North ===
1986 Queensland state election: Rockhampton North
Party	Candidate	Votes	%	±%
Labor	Les Yewdale	10,537	56.2	−2.5
National	Bob Simpson	6,658	35.5	+2.0
Independent	John Murphy	1,560	8.3	+8.3
Total formal votes		18,755	98.1	
Informal votes		364	1.9	
Turnout		19,119	93.3	
Two-party-preferred result
Labor	Les Yewdale	11,309	60.3	+0.8
National	Bob Simpson	7,466	39.7	−0.8
Labor hold		Swing	+0.8	

=== Roma ===
1986 Queensland state election: Roma
Party	Candidate	Votes	%	±%
National	Russell Cooper	4,949	69.5	+15.7
Labor	Ray Johanson	2,167	30.5	+0.6
Total formal votes		7,116	97.7	
Informal votes		164	2.3	
Turnout		7,280	92.1	
National hold		Swing	+3.4	

=== Salisbury ===
1986 Queensland state election: Salisbury
Party	Candidate	Votes	%	±%
Labor	Len Ardill	8,957	45.3	−1.1
National	Gordon Fisher	5,964	30.2	−3.4
Liberal	Richard Iliff	4,855	24.6	+4.7
Total formal votes		19,776	98.1	
Informal votes		388	1.9	
Turnout		20,164	93.1	
Two-party-preferred result
Labor	Len Ardill	10,156	51.4	+1.1
National	Gordon Fisher	9,620	48.6	−1.1
Labor hold		Swing	+1.1	

=== Sandgate ===
1986 Queensland state election: Sandgate
Party	Candidate	Votes	%	±%
Labor	Nev Warburton	10,635	59.2	−0.7
National	John Curtin	4,428	24.6	−2.9
Liberal	Ivan Storey	2,904	16.2	+3.6
Total formal votes		17,967	98.0	
Informal votes		369	2.0	
Turnout		18,336	92.7	
Two-party-preferred result
Labor	Nev Warburton	11,445	63.7	+2.5
National	John Curtin	6,522	36.3	−2.5
Labor hold		Swing	+2.5	

=== Sherwood ===
1986 Queensland state election: Sherwood
Party	Candidate	Votes	%	±%
Liberal	Angus Innes	12,323	67.7	+27.6
Labor	Peter Rowe	5,868	32.3	+0.7
Total formal votes		18,191	96.3	
Informal votes		692	3.7	
Turnout		18,883	92.1	
Liberal hold		Swing	+4.3	

=== Somerset ===
1986 Queensland state election: Somerset
Party	Candidate	Votes	%	±%
National	Bill Gunn	11,720	64.0	+9.7
Labor	Ron Hazelden	6,594	36.0	−1.1
Total formal votes		18,314	97.0	
Informal votes		573	3.0	
Turnout		18,887	92.4	
National hold		Swing	−2.5	

=== South Brisbane ===
1986 Queensland state election: South Brisbane
Party	Candidate	Votes	%	±%
Labor	Anne Warner	8,222	48.1	−6.9
National	Leo Tsimpikas	4,754	27.8	−2.0
Liberal	Guri Lluka	3,595	21.0	+6.9
Socialist Workers	Susanne Bolton	533	3.1	+3.1
Total formal votes		17,104	96.6	
Informal votes		604	3.4	
Turnout		17,708	88.3	
Two-party-preferred result
Labor	Anne Warner	9,273	54.2	−2.6
National	Leo Tsimpikas	7,831	45.8	+2.6
Labor hold		Swing	−2.6	

=== South Coast ===
1986 Queensland state election: South Coast
Party	Candidate	Votes	%	±%
National	Russ Hinze	8,459	49.7	+1.1
Labor	Rupert Granrott	5,153	30.3	−8.2
Liberal	John Richardson	3,410	20.0	+7.0
Total formal votes		17,022	98.0	
Informal votes		344	2.0	
Turnout		17,366	87.8	
Two-party-preferred result
National	Russ Hinze	10,848	63.7	+3.0
Labor	Rupert Granrott	6,174	36.3	−3.0
National hold		Swing	+3.0	

==== By-election ====
- This by-election was caused by the resignation of Russ Hinze. It was held on 28 August 1988.

1988 South Coast state by-election
Party	Candidate	Votes	%	±%
National	Judy Gamin	5,716	30.43	−19.26
Liberal	Bob Quinn	5,426	28.89	+8.86
Labor	Dallas Watson	4,293	22.85	−7.42
Independent	Philip Black	1,488	7.92	+7.92
Citizens Electoral Council	Lindsay Hartwig	589	3.14	+3.14
Democrats	A W Kennedy	571	2.51	+2.51
Australian Independents	Bruce Whiteside	420	2.30	+2.30
ASSP	E Groom	225	1.20	+1.20
Independent	James Drabsch	83	0.44	+0.44
Independent	J Kachel	61	0.32	+0.32
Total formal votes		18,784	95.27	−2.75
Informal votes		932	4.73	+2.75
Turnout		19,716	77.60	−10.22
Two-candidate-preferred result
National	Judy Gamin	9,464	50.38	
Liberal	Bob Quinn	9,320	49.62	
National hold		Swing		

=== Southport ===
1986 Queensland state election: Southport
Party	Candidate	Votes	%	±%
National	Doug Jennings	8,338	50.9	−1.2
Liberal	Timothy Baker	3,853	23.5	+8.4
Labor	Alfred Stubbs	3,648	22.3	−10.5
Democrats	Susan Petersen	535	3.3	+3.3
Total formal votes		16,374	98.2	
Informal votes		299	1.8	
Turnout		16,673	89.1	
Two-party-preferred result
National	Doug Jennings	10,430	63.7	+3.0
Labor	Alfred Stubbs	5,944	36.3	−3.0
National hold		Swing	+3.0	

==== By-election ====
- This by-election was caused by the death of Doug Jennings. It was held on 20 June 1987.

1987 Southport state by-election
Party	Candidate	Votes	%	±%
National	Mick Veivers	7,164	46.20	−4.72
Liberal	Keith Thompson	3,928	25.33	+1.80
Labor	Robert Lee	3,806	24.54	+2.26
Independent	Jim McDonagh	490	3.16	+3.16
Independent	William Aabraham-Steer	118	0.76	+0.76
Total formal votes		15,506	97.93	−0.28
Informal votes		327	2.07	+0.28
Turnout		15,833	74.52	−14.56
Two-party-preferred result
National	Mick Veivers	10,530	67.91	
Labor	Robert Lee	4976	32.09	
National hold		Swing		

=== Springwood ===
1986 Queensland state election: Springwood
Party	Candidate	Votes	%	±%
Labor	Edward Warren	5,943	32.1	
Liberal	Christopher Macdade	3,924	21.2	
National	Huan Fraser	3,364	18.2	
National	Howard Edmunds	2,893	15.6	
Independent	Kay Elson	851	4.6	
Independent	Eric Dawson	807	4.4	
Independent	Allan de Brenni	507	2.7	
Democrats	Humphrey Maltman	248	1.3	
Total formal votes		18,537	97.5	
Informal votes		469	2.5	
Turnout		19,006	91.8	
Two-party-preferred result
National	Huan Fraser	10,414	56.2	+4.0
Labor	Edward Warren	8,123	43.8	−4.0
National hold		Swing	+4.0	

=== Stafford ===
1986 Queensland state election: Stafford
Party	Candidate	Votes	%	±%
Labor	Janine Walker	7,560	42.6	−2.6
Liberal	Terry Gygar	4,901	27.5	−0.1
National	Robert Hutschinson	4,666	26.3	−1.0
Democrats	Marjorie Blair-West	602	3.4	+3.4
Total formal votes		17,729	98.4	
Informal votes		288	1.6	
Turnout		18,017	93.8	
Two-party-preferred result
Liberal	Terry Gygar	9,656	54.5	+3.7
Labor	Janine Walker	8,073	45.5	−3.7
Liberal gain from Labor		Swing	+3.7	

=== Surfers Paradise ===
1986 Queensland state election: Surfers Paradise
Party	Candidate	Votes	%	±%
National	Rob Borbidge	8,221	54.2	−2.7
Liberal	Laurence Wade	3,306	21.8	+8.3
Labor	Bruce Farrell	3,130	20.7	−8.8
Democrats	Ken Petersen	370	2.4	+2.4
Vigilance	Warren Fenton	134	0.9	+0.9
Total formal votes		15,161	97.3	
Turnout		421	2.7	
Turnout		15,582	85.3	
Two-party-preferred result
National	Rob Borbidge	10,810	71.3	+0.8
Labor	Bruce Farrell	4,351	28.7	−0.8
National hold		Swing	+0.8	

=== Tablelands ===
1986 Queensland state election: Tablelands
Party	Candidate	Votes	%	±%
National	Tom Gilmore	6,281	51.1	
Labor	James Mealing	4,586	37.3	
Liberal	Richard Male	994	8.1	
Independent	Ralph Reese	430	3.5	
Total formal votes		12,291	97.2	
Informal votes		347	2.8	
Turnout		12,638	90.6	
Two-party-preferred result
National	Tom Gilmore	7,215	58.7	+4.2
Labor	James Mealing	5,076	41.3	−4.2
National hold		Swing	+4.2	

=== Thuringowa ===
1986 Queensland state election: Thuringowa
Party	Candidate	Votes	%	±%
Labor	Ken McElligott	8,696	45.9	
National	Bronwyn Walker	6,757	35.6	
Liberal	Allan Paulsen	3,513	18.5	
Total formal votes		18,966	98.2	
Informal votes		347	1.8	
Turnout		19,313	89.5	
Two-party-preferred result
Labor	Ken McElligott	9,624	50.7	−3.5
National	Bronwyn Walker	9,342	49.3	+3.5
Labor hold		Swing	−3.5	

=== Toowong ===
1986 Queensland state election: Toowong
Party	Candidate	Votes	%	±%
Liberal	Denver Beanland	7,157	41.2	+11.7
Labor	Jonathan Ford	5,164	29.7	−6.0
National	Earle Bailey	5,062	29.1	−5.6
Total formal votes		17,383	98.7	
Informal votes		230	1.3	
Turnout		17,613	89.2	
Two-party-preferred result
Liberal	Denver Beanland	11,884	68.4	+68.4
Labor	Jonathan Ford	5,499	31.6	−15.6
Liberal gain from National		Swing	N/A	

=== Toowoomba North ===
1986 Queensland state election: Toowoomba North
Party	Candidate	Votes	%	±%
National	Sandy McPhie	8,665	47.5	+11.0
Labor	Sheila Forknall	6,860	37.6	−5.0
Liberal	Janet Rankin	2,705	14.8	−6.1
Total formal votes		18,230	98.2	
Informal votes		341	1.8	
Turnout		18,571	93.0	
Two-party-preferred result
National	Sandy McPhie	10,505	57.6	+3.5
Labor	Sheila Forknall	7,725	42.4	−3.5
National hold		Swing	+3.5	

=== Toowoomba South ===
1986 Queensland state election: Toowoomba South
Party	Candidate	Votes	%	±%
National	Clive Berghofer	8,401	47.6	−4.4
Labor	Neville Green	4,129	23.4	−14.3
Liberal	John Gouldson	3,301	18.7	+8.4
Independent	Peter Mather	1,809	10.3	+10.3
Total formal votes		17,640	98.4	
Informal votes		277	1.6	
Turnout		17,917	92.2	
Two-party-preferred result
National	Clive Berghofer	11,607	65.8	+5.7
Labor	Neville Green	6,033	34.2	−5.7
National hold		Swing	+5.7	

=== Townsville ===
1986 Queensland state election: Townsville
Party	Candidate	Votes	%	±%
Labor	Tony Mooney	6,693	38.3	−9.1
National	Tony Burreket	6,014	34.5	+5.8
Liberal	Bill Mason	4,140	23.7	+6.0
Democrats	Shireen Malamoo	610	3.5	+3.5
Total formal votes		17,457	97.8	
Informal votes		384	2.2	
Turnout		17,841	86.5	
Two-party-preferred result
National	Tony Burreket	9,502	54.4	+3.9
Labor	Tony Mooney	7,955	45.6	−3.9
National gain from Labor		Swing	+3.9	

- The redistribution before the election made Townsville a notionally National-held seat. The Labor candidate did not manage to win it back.

=== Townsville East ===
1986 Queensland state election: Townsville East
Party	Candidate	Votes	%	±%
Labor	Geoff Smith	8,936	53.0	
National	Dickway Goon Chew	5,234	31.1	
Liberal	Vincent Nielsen	2,686	15.9	
Total formal votes		16,856	98.1	
Informal votes		332	1.9	
Turnout		17,188	88.9	
Two-party-preferred result
Labor	Geoff Smith	9,692	57.5	−2.4
National	Dickway Goon Chew	7,164	42.5	+2.4
Labor hold		Swing	−2.4	

=== Warrego ===
1986 Queensland state election: Warrego
Party	Candidate	Votes	%	±%
National	Howard Hobbs	4,155	53.7	−4.3
Labor	Gordon Harding	3,576	46.3	+4.3
Total formal votes		7,731	98.1	
Informal votes		153	1.9	
Turnout		7,884	91.0	
National hold		Swing	−4.3	

=== Warwick ===
1986 Queensland state election: Warwick
Party	Candidate	Votes	%	±%
National	Des Booth	8,158	72.1	+1.5
Labor	Bev Brennan	3,151	27.9	−1.5
Total formal votes		11,309	98.2	−0.1
Informal votes		209	1.8	+0.1
Turnout		11,518	93.5	−0.3
National hold		Swing	+1.5	

=== Whitsunday ===
1986 Queensland state election: Whitsunday
Party	Candidate	Votes	%	±%
National	Geoff Muntz	8,219	51.9	−4.6
Labor	Peter Jardine	6,066	38.3	−5.2
Liberal	Robert Rowley	1,550	9.8	+9.8
Total formal votes		15,835	98.4	−0.4
Informal votes		263	1.6	+0.4
Turnout		16,098	90.6	+0.2
Two-party-preferred result
National	Geoff Muntz	9,343	59.0	+1.3
Labor	Peter Jardine	6,492	41.0	−1.3
National hold		Swing	+1.3	

=== Windsor ===
1986 Queensland state election: Windsor
Party	Candidate	Votes	%	±%
Labor	Pat Comben	9,211	51.8	+4.4
National	Bob Moore	4,800	27.0	−5.4
Liberal	Karen Muir-McCarey	3,775	21.2	+1.1
Total formal votes		17,786	98.0	
Informal votes		367	2.0	
Turnout		18,153	91.4	
Two-party-preferred result
Labor	Pat Comben	10,263	57.7	+3.0
National	Bob Moore	7,523	42.3	−3.0
Labor hold		Swing	+3.0	

=== Wolston ===
1986 Queensland state election: Wolston
Party	Candidate	Votes	%	±%
Labor	Bob Gibbs	10,207	56.6	−4.7
Liberal	Hendrik Schimmel	4,410	24.4	−14.3
National	Ron Jakeman	3,426	19.0	+19.0
Total formal votes		18,043	95.5	
Informal votes		855	4.5	
Turnout		18,898	90.8	
Two-party-preferred result
Labor	Bob Gibbs	10,411	57.8	−3.3
Liberal	Hendrik Schimmel	7,632	42.2	+3.3
Labor hold		Swing	−3.3	

=== Woodridge ===
1986 Queensland state election: Woodridge
Party	Candidate	Votes	%	±%
Labor	Bill D'Arcy	8,977	52.3	+3.4
National	Jon Cooper	3,888	22.7	−10.9
Liberal	Graeme Collins	2,170	12.6	+3.2
Independent	Graham Able	1,992	11.6	+11.6
Socialist Labour	Kenneth Mantell	138	0.8	+0.3
Total formal votes		17,165	97.1	
Informal votes		511	2.9	
Turnout		17,676	88.1	
Two-party-preferred result
Labor	Bill D'Arcy	10,471	61.0	−1.9
National	Jon Cooper	6,694	39.0	+1.9
Labor hold		Swing	−1.9	

=== Yeronga ===
1986 Queensland state election: Yeronga
Party	Candidate	Votes	%	±%
Labor	John Mickel	7,396	40.3	−6.8
Liberal	Norm Lee	5,386	29.4	−23.5
National	Peter Castrisos	4,430	24.2	+24.2
Independent	Kitchener Farrell	1,125	6.1	+6.1
Total formal votes		18,337	97.9	
Informal votes		389	2.1	
Turnout		18,726	91.7	
Two-party-preferred result
Liberal	Norm Lee	10,213	55.7	+1.3
Labor	John Mickel	8,124	44.3	−1.3
Liberal hold		Swing	+1.3	

== See also ==
- 1986 Queensland state election
- Members of the Queensland Legislative Assembly, 1986–1989
- Candidates of the Queensland state election, 1986
