= Candidates of the 1986 Queensland state election =

The 1986 Queensland state election was held on 1 November 1986.

== By-elections ==
- On 19 May 1984, Henry Palaszczuk (Labor) was elected to succeed Kevin Hooper (Labor), who had died on 9 March 1984, as the member for Archerfield.
- On 4 August 1984, Terry Gygar (Liberal) was elected to succeed Dr Denis Murphy, who had died on 21 June 1984, as the member for Stafford.
- On 16 February 1985, Paul Braddy (Labor) was elected to succeed Keith Wright (Labor), who had resigned on 5 November 1984, as the member for Rockhampton.
- On 2 November 1985, Paul Clauson (National) was elected to succeed John Goleby (National), who had died on 10 September 1985, as the member for Redlands.

== Retiring Members ==
=== Labor ===
- Jim Fouras (South Brisbane) - Lost preselection

=== National ===
- Brian Cahill (Aspley) - Lost preselection
- Bill Kaus (Mansfield)
- Neil Turner (Warrego)
- John Warner (Toowoomba South)
- Claude Wharton (Burnett)

=== Independent ===
- Lindsay Hartwig (Callide)
- Col Miller (Ithaca) - Elected for the Liberal Party

== Legislative Assembly ==
Sitting members at the time of the election are shown in bold text.

| Electorate | Held by | Labor candidate | Liberal candidate | National candidate | Other candidates |
|---|---|---|---|---|---|
| Albert | National | Tom Harrison | Vince Camilleri | **Ivan Gibbs** | |
| Archerfield | Labor | **Henry Palaszczuk** | John Shea | Peter Jorgensen | |
| Ashgrove | Labor | **Tom Veivers** | Alan Sherlock | Frank Gaffy | Paul Wright (Dem) |
| Aspley | National | Joe Marney | Scott McLeay | Beryce Nelson | Paul Wright (Ind) |
| Auburn | National | Tom Hall | | **Neville Harper** | |
| Balonne | National | Elwyn Brookes | | **Don Neal** | |
| Barambah | National | Jim Horton | | **Joh Bjelke-Petersen** | |
| Barron River | National | Terry Doyle | | **Martin Tenni** | |
| Bowen | Labor | Ken Smyth | Jeanette Hunter | Jim Turner | |
| Brisbane Central | Labor | **Brian Davis** | Muriel Ward | Peter Peters | Jack Cotter (SPA); Mark Gardener (Ind); Tony Kneipp (Ind) |
| Broadsound | National | Chris Palmer | | Denis Hinton | Ros Scott (Ind); Barbara Wildin (Ind) |
| Bulimba | Labor | **Ron McLean** | Alan Bavister | Judith Brown | |
| Bundaberg | Labor | **Clem Campbell** | | Heather Galley | Alex Warren (Ind) |
| Burdekin | National | Richard Tucker | Colin Jackson | **Mark Stoneman** | Laurence Fabrellas (Ind) |
| Burnett | National | Robin Webcke | | Doug Slack | |
| Caboolture | Labor | Ken Hayward | | Ron Grant | |
| Cairns | Labor | **Keith De Lacy** | | Terry Adair | |
| Callide | Independent | Nick Kofoed | Geoffrey Clarke | Di McCauley | Barry James (Ind) |
| Carnarvon | National | Paul Lucas | | **Peter McKechnie** | |
| Chatsworth | Labor | **Terry Mackenroth** | Ian Chandler | Greg Jones | |
| Condamine | National | Gordon Zigenbine | | **Brian Littleproud** | |
| Cook | Labor | **Bob Scott** | | Getano Lui | |
| Cooroora | National | Brian Payler | Wehl Wansley | **Gordon Simpson** | John Boultbee (Dem) |
| Cunningham | National | Paul Kerswell | | **Tony Elliott** | |
| Currumbin | National | Noel Elliot | Robert Freebairn | Leo Gately | Trevor Coomber (Ind); Yvonne Stoelhorst (Dem) |
| Everton | Labor | **Glen Milliner** | Greg Smith | Richard Jackson | |
| Fassifern | National | Jim Egan | Margaret Grevett | **Kev Lingard** | |
| Flinders | National | **Alex Wilson** | | **Bob Katter** | |
| Glass House | National | Lloyd Barr | Ernie McEntee | **Bill Newton** | Glen Spicer (Dem) |
| Greenslopes | National | Fred Wright | Bill Hewitt | **Leisha Harvey** | Ron Smith (Ind) |
| Gregory | National | Kevin Alexander | | **Bill Glasson** | |
| Gympie | National | Sven Condon | Bruce Kean | **Len Stephan** | |
| Hinchinbrook | National | Allan Vitale | John Williams | **Ted Row** | Ron Dunn (Ind) |
| Ipswich | Labor | **David Hamill** | Janice Akroyd | Michael Byrnes | |
| Ipswich West | Labor | **David Underwood** | Ken Clift | Neil Russell | |
| Isis | National | Bill Nunn | | **Lin Powell** | William Elson-Green (Ind); Kevin Hendstock (Ind) |
| Landsborough | National | Michael Cramb | John McCaw | **Mike Ahern** | |
| Lockyer | National | Jack Phelan | Fabius Manners | **Tony Fitzgerald** | |
| Logan | Labor | **Wayne Goss** | Allen Johnstone | Wendy Howard | Heather Haub (SPA) |
| Lytton | Labor | **Tom Burns** | Daryl Mercer | Liz Upton | |
| Mackay | Labor | **Ed Casey** | Charles Camilleri | Greg Williamson | |
| Manly | Labor | **Eric Shaw** | Des Morris | Merv Hoppner | |
| Mansfield | National | Nicole Stehn | Leo White | Craig Sherrin | |
| Maryborough | National | Peter Nightingale | | **Gilbert Alison** | |
| Merthyr | Liberal | Garrett Purtill | Santo Santoro | **Don Lane** | Bernard O'Malley (Dem); Maurice Sibelle (SWP) |
| Mirani | National | Jeff Gascoyne | | **Jim Randell** | |
| Moggill | Liberal | Harry Thornton | **Bill Lickiss** | Douglas Mactaggart | Geoffrey Fawthrop (Dem) |
| Mount Coot-tha | Liberal | John Moran | Lyle Schuntner | Geoff Colless | John Elfick (Dem) |
| Mount Gravatt | National | Pauline McLaughlin | Guelfi Scassola | **Ian Henderson** | Christine Shackleton (TWP) |
| Mount Isa | Labor | **Bill Price** | Peter Beard | Lilian Miller | |
| Mourilyan | Labor | **Bill Eaton** | Andrea Walduck | Malcolm Taylor | |
| Mulgrave | National | Warren Pitt | Andrew Rankine | **Max Menzel** | |
| Murrumba | Labor | Deane Wells | Jenny Roberts | Leslie Fletcher | **Joe Kruger** (Ind) |
| Nerang | National | Marjorie Thompson | Russell Stuart | Tom Hynd | Tony Kennedy (Dem); Bob Sparks (Ind) |
| Nicklin | National | Ian Matthews | Geoffrey Malcolm | **Brian Austin** | Barbara Camplin (Dem) |
| Nudgee | Labor | **Ken Vaughan** | Peter Hull | Reginald Rofe | |
| Nundah | Liberal | Gary Johns | **William Knox** | Goodwin Poole | |
| Peak Downs | National | Albert Holzapfel | | **Vince Lester** | Vrettos Cominos (Ind) |
| Pine Rivers | National | Daniel O'Connell | Rob Akers | **Yvonne Chapman** | Isobel Robinson (Dem) |
| Port Curtis | Labor | **Bill Prest** | | Colin Brown | Kevin Meyrick (Ind) |
| Redcliffe | Liberal | Peter Houston | **Terry White** | Richard Proctor | Murray Rutherford (Ind) |
| Redlands | National | Graeme Kinnear | Martin Shepherd | **Paul Clauson** | Richard May (Dem) |
| Rockhampton | Labor | **Paul Braddy** | | Dennis Stevenson | Carl Hatte (Ind) |
| Rockhampton North | Labor | **Les Yewdale** | | Bob Simpson | John Murphy (Ind) |
| Roma | National | Ray Johanson | | **Russell Cooper** | |
| Salisbury | Labor | Len Ardill | Richard Iliff | Gordon Fisher | |
| Sandgate | Labor | **Nev Warburton** | Ivan Storey | John Curtin | |
| Sherwood | Liberal | Peter Rowe | **Angus Innes** | | |
| Somerset | National | Ron Hazelden | | **Bill Gunn** | |
| South Brisbane | Labor | **Anne Warner** | Guri Lluka | Leo Tsimpikas | Susanne Bolton (SWP) |
| South Coast | National | Rupert Granrott | John Richardson | **Russ Hinze** | |
| Southport | National | Alfred Stubbs | Timothy Baker | **Doug Jennings** | Susan Petersen (Dem) |
| Springwood | National | Edward Warren | Christopher Macdade | Howard Edmunds; Huan Fraser* | Eric Dawson (Ind); Allan de Brenni (Ind); Kay Elson (Ind); Humphrey Maltman (Dem) |
| Stafford | Labor | Janine Walker | **Terry Gygar** | Robert Hutchinson | Marjorie Blair-West (Dem) |
| Surfers Paradise | National | Bruce Farrell | Laurence Wade | **Rob Borbidge** | Warren Fenton (Vig); Ken Petersen (Dem) |
| Tablelands | National | James Mealing | Richard Male | Tom Gilmore | Ralph Reese (Ind) |
| Thuringowa | Labor | **Ken McElligott** | Allan Paulsen | Bronwyn Walker | |
| Toowong | National | Jonathan Ford | Denver Beanland | **Earle Bailey** | |
| Toowoomba North | National | Sheila Forknall | Janet Rankin | **Sandy McPhie** | |
| Toowoomba South | National | Neville Green | John Gouldson | Clive Berghofer | Peter Mather (Ind) |
| Townsville | Labor | Tony Mooney | Bill Mason | Tony Burreket | Shireen Malamoo (Dem) |
| Townsville East | Labor | **Geoff Smith** | Vincent Nielsen | Dickway Goon Chew | |
| Warrego | National | Gordon Harding | | Howard Hobbs | |
| Warwick | National | Bev Brennan | | **Des Booth** | |
| Whitsunday | National | Peter Jardine | Robert Rowley | **Geoff Muntz** | |
| Windsor | Labor | **Pat Comben** | Keren Muir-McCarey | Bob Moore | |
| Wolston | Labor | **Bob Gibbs** | Hendrik Schimmel | Ron Jakeman | |
| Woodridge | Labor | **Bill D'Arcy** | Graeme Collins | Jon Cooper | Graham Able (Ind); Kenneth Mantell (SLL) |
| Yeronga | Liberal | John Mickel | **Norm Lee** | Peter Castrisos | Kitchener Farrell (Ind) |

== See also ==
- 1986 Queensland state election
- Members of the Queensland Legislative Assembly, 1983–1986
- Members of the Queensland Legislative Assembly, 1986–1989
- List of political parties in Australia
