= Electoral results for the district of Mount Isa =

Queensland, Australia, district election results

This is a list of electoral results for the electoral district of Mount Isa in Queensland state elections.

== Members for Mount Isa ==
Member	Party	Term
Alex Inch	Labor	1972–1974
Angelo Bertoni	National	1974–1983
Bill Price	Labor	1983–1986
Peter Beard	Liberal	1986–1989
Tony McGrady	Labor	1989–2006
Betty Kiernan	Labor	2006–2012
Robbie Katter	Katter's Australian Party	2012–2017

== Election results ==
=== Elections in the 2010s ===
2015 Queensland state election: Mount Isa
Party	Candidate	Votes	%	±%
Katter's Australian	Robbie Katter	7,468	46.77	+5.16
Liberal National	John Wharton	4,646	29.09	−0.47
Labor	Simon Tayler	2,899	18.15	−8.49
One Nation	Scott Sheard	638	4.00	+4.00
Greens	Marcus Foth	318	1.99	−0.18
Total formal votes		15,969	98.37	+0.01
Informal votes		264	1.63	−0.01
Turnout		16,233	83.59	−1.83
Two-candidate-preferred result
Katter's Australian	Robbie Katter	9,304	65.19	+5.15
Liberal National	John Wharton	4,968	34.81	−5.15
Katter's Australian hold		Swing	+5.15	

2012 Queensland state election: Mount Isa
Party	Candidate	Votes	%	±%
Katter's Australian	Robbie Katter	6,658	41.61	+41.61
Liberal National	Mick Pattel	4,731	29.57	+0.08
Labor	Betty Kiernan	4,264	26.65	−17.80
Greens	Colleen Williams	348	2.17	−0.34
Total formal votes		16,001	98.36	+0.03
Informal votes		267	1.64	−0.03
Turnout		16,268	85.42	−0.34
Two-candidate-preferred result
Katter's Australian	Robbie Katter	7,996	60.04	+60.04
Liberal National	Mick Pattel	5,322	39.96	−4.32
Katter's Australian gain from Labor		Swing	N/A	

=== Elections in the 2000s ===
2009 Queensland state election: Mount Isa
Party	Candidate	Votes	%	±%
Labor	Betty Kiernan	7,186	44.5	−9.1
Liberal National	Ted Randall	4,768	29.5	−6.9
Independent	Keith Douglas	3,590	22.2	+22.2
Greens	Paul Costin	406	2.5	+2.5
Independent	Roy Collins	216	1.3	+1.3
Total formal votes		16,166	98.2	
Informal votes		275	1.8	
Turnout		16,441	85.8	
Two-party-preferred result
Labor	Betty Kiernan	8,092	55.7	−2.8
Liberal National	Ted Randall	6,430	44.3	+2.8
Labor hold		Swing	−2.8	

2006 Queensland state election: Mount Isa
Party	Candidate	Votes	%	±%
Labor	Betty Kiernan	7,705	56.5	−5.3
National	Roy Collins	4,384	32.2	−1.5
Family First	Merlin Manners	1,544	11.3	+11.3
Total formal votes		13,633	98.0	−0.1
Informal votes		272	2.0	+0.1
Turnout		13,905	84.6	−2.1
Two-party-preferred result
Labor	Betty Kiernan	8,156	62.3	−1.9
National	Roy Collins	4,939	37.7	+1.9
Labor hold		Swing	−1.9	

2004 Queensland state election: Mount Isa
Party	Candidate	Votes	%	±%
Labor	Tony McGrady	8,898	61.8	+4.2
National	Alan Dredge	4,859	33.7	+13.0
Greens	Nick Harris	652	4.5	+4.5
Total formal votes		14,409	98.1	−0.5
Informal votes		274	1.9	+0.5
Turnout		14,683	86.7	−2.0
Two-party-preferred result
Labor	Tony McGrady	9,077	64.2	−2.0
National	Alan Dredge	5,072	35.8	+35.8
Labor hold		Swing	−2.0	

2001 Queensland state election: Mount Isa
Party	Candidate	Votes	%	±%
Labor	Tony McGrady	8,981	57.6	+3.1
One Nation	Larry Braden	3,384	21.7	−3.0
National	Annie Clarke	3,220	20.7	+2.5
Total formal votes		15,585	98.6	
Informal votes		216	1.4	
Turnout		15,801	88.7	
Two-candidate-preferred result
Labor	Tony McGrady	9,593	66.2	+3.2
One Nation	Larry Braden	4,892	33.8	−3.2
Labor hold		Swing	+3.2	

=== Elections in the 1990s ===
1998 Queensland state election: Mount Isa
Party	Candidate	Votes	%	±%
Labor	Tony McGrady	7,562	58.5	−6.1
One Nation	Malcolm MacDonald	3,175	24.5	+24.5
National	Bill Baldwin	1,900	14.7	−13.9
Reform	Shirleen Webber	158	1.2	+1.2
Shooters	Ian Inglis	139	1.1	+1.1
Total formal votes		12,934	98.8	+0.3
Informal votes		156	1.2	−0.3
Turnout		13,090	89.2	+3.9
Two-candidate-preferred result
Labor	Tony McGrady	8,029	65.6	−3.1
One Nation	Malcolm MacDonald	4,207	34.4	+34.4
Labor hold		Swing	−3.1	

1995 Queensland state election: Mount Isa
Party	Candidate	Votes	%	±%
Labor	Tony McGrady	8,198	64.6	+3.2
National	Ronald Bird	3,637	28.6	+7.7
Independent	Clarence Walden	865	6.8	+6.8
Total formal votes		12,700	98.5	+0.7
Informal votes		190	1.5	−0.7
Turnout		12,890	85.3	
Two-party-preferred result
Labor	Tony McGrady	8,616	68.7	+1.1
National	Ronald Bird	3,922	31.3	−1.1
Labor hold		Swing	+1.1	

1992 Queensland state election: Mount Isa
Party	Candidate	Votes	%	±%
Labor	Tony McGrady	9,068	61.4	+4.8
National	Jeff Daniels	3,087	20.9	+8.6
Liberal	Glen Brown	1,817	12.3	−15.6
Confederate Action	Bill Petrie	484	3.3	+3.3
Indigenous Peoples	Jacob George	315	2.1	+2.1
Total formal votes		14,771	97.9	
Informal votes		323	2.1	
Turnout		15,094	86.7	
Two-party-preferred result
Labor	Tony McGrady	9,487	67.6	+9.0
National	Jeff Daniels	4,550	32.4	+32.4
Labor hold		Swing	+9.0	

=== Elections in the 1980s ===
1989 Queensland state election: Mount Isa
Party	Candidate	Votes	%	±%
Labor	Tony McGrady	6,760	59.6	+14.1
Liberal	Peter Beard	3,712	32.7	+1.6
National	Stephen Wollaston	877	7.7	−15.7
Total formal votes		11,349	95.9	−1.9
Informal votes		489	4.1	+1.9
Turnout		11,838	88.6	−0.3
Two-party-preferred result
Labor	Tony McGrady	6,821	60.1	+12.8
Liberal	Peter Beard	4,528	39.9	−12.8
Labor gain from Liberal		Swing	+12.8	

1986 Queensland state election: Mount Isa
Party	Candidate	Votes	%	±%
Labor	Bill Price	4,677	45.5	−6.0
Liberal	Peter Beard	3,197	31.1	+31.1
National	Lilian Miller	2,409	23.4	−22.5
Total formal votes		10,283	97.8	
Informal votes		236	2.2	
Turnout		10,519	88.9	
Two-party-preferred result
Liberal	Peter Beard	5,423	52.7	+52.7
Labor	Bill Price	4,860	47.3	−4.4
Liberal gain from Labor		Swing	+4.4	

1983 Queensland state election: Mount Isa
Party	Candidate	Votes	%	±%
Labor	Bill Price	6,611	51.5	+7.1
National	Angelo Bertoni	5,883	45.8	+3.0
Independent	Desmond Welk	337	2.6	+2.6
Total formal votes		12,831	97.5	+0.2
Informal votes		329	2.5	−0.2
Turnout		13,160	86.1	+2.1
Two-party-preferred result
Labor	Bill Price	6,780	52.8	+3.7
National	Angelo Bertoni	6,051	47.2	−3.7
Labor gain from National		Swing	+3.7	

1980 Queensland state election: Mount Isa
Party	Candidate	Votes	%	±%
Labor	Tony McGrady	5,398	44.4	−2.3
National	Angelo Bertoni	5,209	42.8	−2.7
Liberal	Joyce Boyd	1,048	8.6	+8.6
Democrats	Ray Oldman	504	4.2	+4.2
Total formal votes		12,159	97.3	+1.2
Informal votes		331	2.7	−1.2
Turnout		12,490	84.0	−0.9
Two-party-preferred result
National	Angelo Bertoni	6,192	50.9	+0.3
Labor	Tony McGrady	5,967	49.1	−0.3
National hold		Swing	+0.3	

=== Elections in the 1970s ===
1977 Queensland state election: Mount Isa
Party	Candidate	Votes	%	±%
Labor	Alex Pavusa	5,341	46.7	+7.8
National	Angelo Bertoni	5,209	45.5	+14.5
Progress	Keith Spanner	556	4.9	+4.9
Independent	Nelson Gavenor	246	2.2	+2.2
Independent	Anthony Assan	86	0.8	+0.8
Total formal votes		11,438	96.1	
Informal votes		464	3.9	
Turnout		11,902	84.9	
Two-party-preferred result
National	Angelo Bertoni	5,783	50.6	−2.9
Labor	Alex Pavusa	5,655	49.4	+2.9
National hold		Swing	−2.9	

1974 Queensland state election: Mount Isa
Party	Candidate	Votes	%	±%
Labor	John Shepherd	4,926	38.9	−26.0
National	Angelo Bertoni	3,923	31.0	+4.5
Liberal	Kevin Coughlan	3,815	30.1	+30.1
Total formal votes		12,664	97.2	+0.1
Informal votes		358	2.8	−0.1
Turnout		13,022	81.4	−2.1
Two-party-preferred result
National	Angelo Bertoni	6,775	53.5	+19.9
Labor	John Shepherd	5,889	46.5	−19.9
National gain from Labor		Swing	+19.9	

1972 Queensland state election: Mount Isa
Party	Candidate	Votes	%	±%
Labor	Alex Inch	4,949	64.9	+6.4
Country	Lillian Noakes	2,964	26.5	−5.9
Queensland Labor	John Turner	957	8.6	+8.6
Total formal votes		11,184	97.1	
Informal votes		332	2.9	
Turnout		11,516	83.5	
Two-party-preferred result
Labor	Alex Inch	7,425	66.4	+3.4
Country	Lillian Oakes	3,759	33.6	−3.4
Labor hold		Swing	+3.4	
