= Members of the Queensland Legislative Assembly, 1986–1989 =

Members of the Queensland Legislative Assembly, 1986–1989

This is a list of members of the 45th Legislative Assembly of Queensland from 1986 to 1989, as elected at the 1986 state election held on 1 November 1986.

Name	Party	Electorate	Term in office
Hon Mike Ahern	National	Landsborough	1968–1990
Hon Gilbert Alison	National	Maryborough	1971–1977, 1983–1989
Len Ardill	Labor	Salisbury	1986–1998
Hon Brian Austin	National	Nicklin	1977–1989
Denver Beanland	Liberal	Toowong	1986–2001
Peter Beard	Liberal	Mount Isa	1986–1989
Clive Berghofer	National	Toowoomba South	1986–1991
Hon Sir Joh Bjelke-Petersen ^{[2]}	National	Barambah	1947–1987
Des Booth	National	Warwick	1977–1992
Hon Rob Borbidge	National	Surfers Paradise	1980–2001
Paul Braddy	Labor	Rockhampton	1985–2001
Tom Burns	Labor	Lytton	1972–1996
Tony Burreket	National	Townsville	1986–1989
Clem Campbell	Labor	Bundaberg	1983–1998
Ed Casey	Labor	Mackay	1969–1995
Hon Yvonne Chapman	National	Pine Rivers	1983–1989
Hon Paul Clauson	National	Redlands	1985–1989
Pat Comben	Labor	Windsor	1983–1995
Hon Russell Cooper	National	Roma	1983–2001
Bill D'Arcy	Labor	Woodridge	1972–1974, 1977–2000
Brian Davis	Labor	Brisbane Central	1969–1974, 1977–1989
Keith De Lacy	Labor	Cairns	1983–1998
Bill Eaton	Labor	Mourilyan	1980–1992
Tony Elliott	National	Cunningham	1974–2001
Hon Tony Fitzgerald	National	Lockyer	1980–1998
Hon Huan Fraser	National	Springwood	1986–1989
Judy Gamin ^{[3]}	National	South Coast	1988–1989, 1992–2001
Leo Gately	National	Currumbin	1986–1989
Hon Ivan Gibbs	National	Albert	1974–1989
Bob Gibbs	Labor	Wolston	1977–1999
Hon Tom Gilmore	National	Tablelands	1986–1998
Hon Bill Glasson	National	Gregory	1974–1989
Wayne Goss	Labor	Logan	1983–1998
Hon Bill Gunn	National	Somerset	1972–1992
Terry Gygar	Liberal	Stafford	1974–1983, 1984–1989
David Hamill	Labor	Ipswich	1983–2001
Hon Neville Harper	National	Auburn	1980–1992
Hon Leisha Harvey	National	Greenslopes	1983–1989
Ken Hayward	Labor	Caboolture	1986–2009
Hon Ian Henderson	National	Mount Gravatt	1983–1989
Denis Hinton	National	Broadsound	1986–1989
Hon Russ Hinze ^{[3]}	National	South Coast	1966–1988
Howard Hobbs	National	Warrego	1986–2015
Tom Hynd	National	Nerang	1986–1989
Angus Innes	Liberal	Sherwood	1978–1990
Doug Jennings ^{[1]}	National	Southport	1980–1987
Hon Bob Katter	National	Flinders	1974–1992
Hon Sir William Knox	Liberal	Nundah	1957–1989
Hon Don Lane ^{[5]}	National	Merthyr	1971–1989
Hon Norm Lee	Liberal	Yeronga	1964–1989
Hon Vince Lester	National	Peak Downs	1974–2004
Hon Bill Lickiss	Liberal	Moggill	1963–1989
Hon Kev Lingard	National	Fassifern	1983–2009
Hon Brian Littleproud	National	Condamine	1983–2001
Terry Mackenroth	Labor	Chatsworth	1977–2005
Di McCauley	National	Callide	1986–1998
Ken McElligott	Labor	Thuringowa	1983–1998
Hon Peter McKechnie	National	Carnarvon	1974–1989
Ron McLean	Labor	Bulimba	1980–1992
Sandy McPhie	National	Toowoomba North	1983–1989
Max Menzel	National	Mulgrave	1980–1989
Glen Milliner	Labor	Everton	1977–1998
Hon Geoff Muntz	National/Independent ^{[7]}	Whitsunday	1980–1989
Hon Don Neal	National	Balonne	1972–1992
Hon Beryce Nelson	National	Aspley	1980–1983, 1986–1989
Bill Newton	National	Glass House	1983–1989
Henry Palaszczuk	Labor	Archerfield	1984–2006
Trevor Perrett ^{[2]}	CEC/National ^{[3]}	Barambah	1988–1998
Hon Lin Powell	National/Independent ^{[6]}	Isis	1974–1989
Bill Prest	Labor	Port Curtis	1976–1992
Hon Jim Randell	National	Mirani	1980–1994
Ted Row	National	Hinchinbrook	1972–1989
Santo Santoro ^{[5]}	Liberal	Merthyr	1989–2001
Lyle Schuntner	Liberal	Mount Coot-tha	1986–1989
Bob Scott	Labor	Cook	1977–1989
Eric Shaw	Labor/Independent ^{[4]}	Manly	1977–1989
Alan Sherlock	Liberal	Ashgrove	1986–1989
Hon Craig Sherrin	National	Mansfield	1986–1989
Hon Gordon Simpson	National	Cooroora	1974–1989
Doug Slack	National	Burnett	1986–2001
Geoff Smith	Labor	Townsville East	1980–1998
Ken Smyth	Labor	Bowen	1986–1992
Len Stephan	National	Gympie	1979–2001
Hon Mark Stoneman	National	Burdekin	1983–1998
Hon Martin Tenni	National	Barron River	1974–1989
David Underwood	Labor	Ipswich West	1977–1989
Ken Vaughan	Labor	Nudgee	1977–1995
Mick Veivers ^{[1]}	National	Southport	1987–2001
Nev Warburton	Labor	Sandgate	1977–1992
Anne Warner	Labor	South Brisbane	1983–1995
Dean Wells	Labor	Murrumba	1986–2012
Terry White	Liberal	Redcliffe	1979–1989
Les Yewdale	Labor	Rockhampton North	1972–1989

^{1} On 9 April 1987, the National member for Southport, Doug Jennings, died. National Party candidate Mick Veivers won the resulting by-election on 20 June 1987.
^{2} On 1 December 1987, the National member for Barambah and former premier, Joh Bjelke-Petersen, resigned. Citizens Electoral Council (CEC) candidate Trevor Perrett won the resulting by-election on 16 April 1988. Perrett subsequently quit the CEC and joined the National Party in December 1988.
^{3} On 24 May 1988, the National member for South Coast, Russ Hinze, resigned following revelations of official corruption at the Fitzgerald Inquiry. National Party candidate Judy Gamin won the resulting by-election on 28 August 1988.
^{4} On 27 September 1988, the Labor member for Manly, Eric Shaw, resigned from the Labor Party following his loss of endorsement to contest the 1989 election. He served out the remainder of his term as an independent.
^{5} On 20 January 1989, the National member for Merthyr, Don Lane, resigned following criminal proceedings resulting from the Fitzgerald Inquiry. Liberal Party candidate Santo Santoro won the resulting by-election on 13 May 1989.
^{6} On 3 June 1989, the member for Isis and Speaker of the Assembly, Lin Powell, left the National Party. He served out the remainder of his term as an independent.
^{7} On 9 November 1989, shortly after the 1989 election had been called, the member for Whitsunday, Geoff Muntz, left the National Party. He served out the remainder of his term as an independent.

== See also ==
- 1986 Queensland state election
- Premiers:
  - Joh Bjelke-Petersen (National Party) (1968–1987)
  - Mike Ahern (National Party) (1987–1989)
  - Russell Cooper (National Party) (1989)
