= 1986 Queensland state election =

- 1 November 1986

All 89 seats in the Legislative Assembly of Queensland 45 Assembly seats were needed for a majority
- Registered: 1,563,294 ▲7.2%
- Turnout: 1,426,478 (91.25%) (▼0.48 pp)
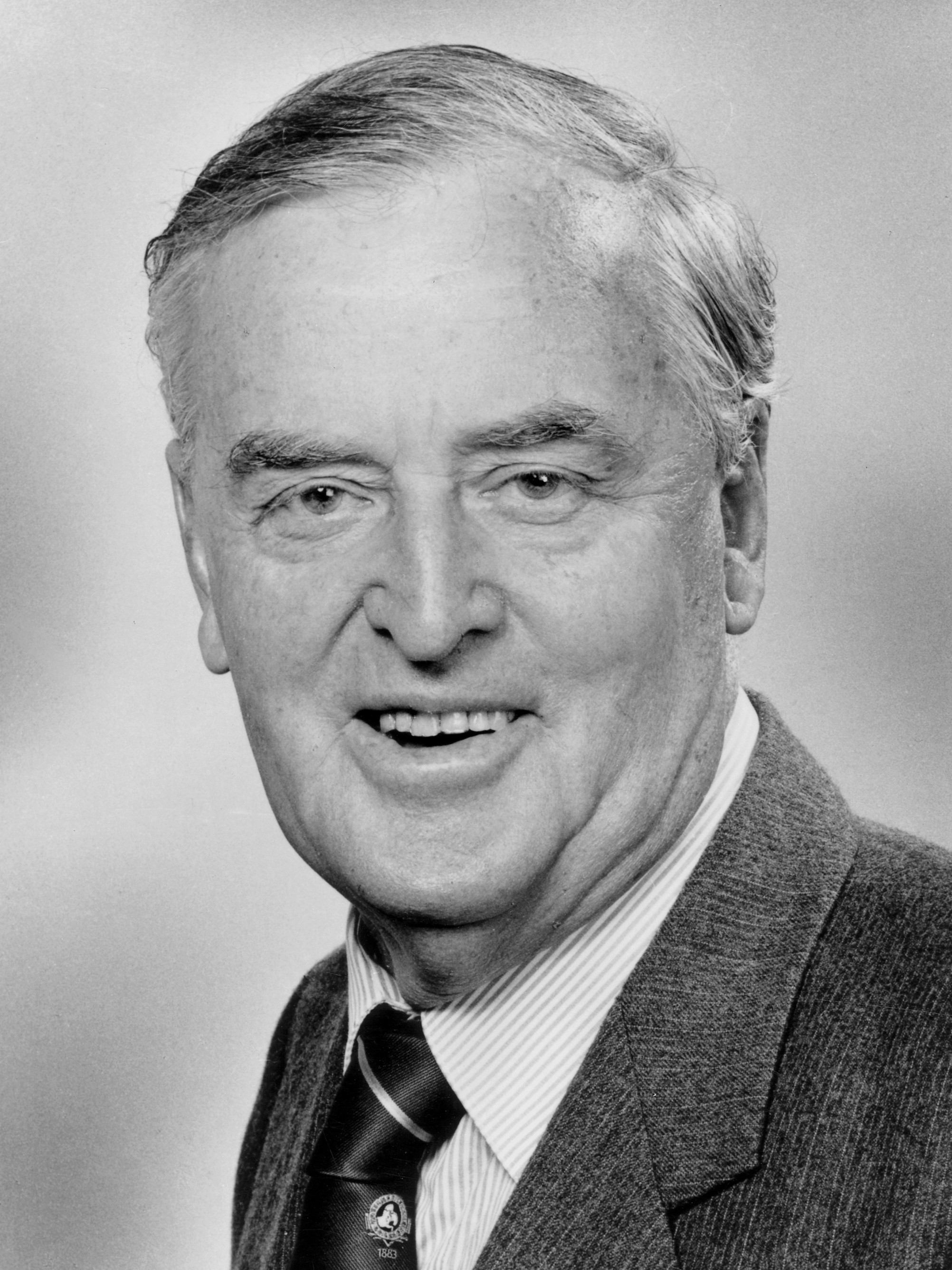

	First party	Second party	Third party
Leader	Joh Bjelke-Petersen	Nev Warburton	William Knox
Party	National	Labor	Liberal
Leader since	8 August 1968	29 August 1984	3 November 1983
Leader's seat	Barambah	Sandgate	Nundah
Last election	41 seats, 38.93%	32 seats, 43.98%	8 seats, 14.88%
Seats before	42 seats	31 seats (Note: Includes Independent–Labor MP for Murrumba Joe Kruger, whom was elected as a Labor candidate in the previous election, however ran as an independent candidate.)	7 seats (Note: Includes Independent–Liberal MP Colin Miller for Ithaca. The seat was abolished at the election.)
Seats won	49	30	10
Seat change	▲7	▼1	▲3
Popular vote	553,197	577,062	230,310
Percentage	39.64%	41.35%	16.50%
Swing	▲1.82 pp	▼5.98 pp	▲10.88 pp
TPP	54.0%	46.0%
TPP swing	▲0.60pp	▼0.60pp
- Winning margin by electorate.

- Legislative Assembly following election.
Premier before election
Joh Bjelke-Petersen
National
Elected Premier
Joh Bjelke-Petersen
National

Elections were held in the Australian state of Queensland on 1 November 1986 to elect the 89 members of the state's Legislative Assembly. It followed a redistribution which increased the number of seats in the Assembly from 82 to 89.

The election resulted in a seventh consecutive term for the National Party under Sir Joh Bjelke-Petersen. It was the 11th consecutive term for the National Party in Queensland since it first came to office in 1957. The Nationals secured a majority in their own right, with 49 seats. It is the only time that the Nationals have ever won enough seats to govern alone in an election at any level. They had come up one seat short of an outright majority in 1983, but picked up a majority after persuading two Liberals to cross the floor.

This was the last time that a non-Labor Government was elected at a Queensland state election until 2012, although the Coalition briefly held government from 1996 to 1998 following the Mundingburra by-election.

This was the last time that a non-Labor Government was re-elected at a Queensland state election as of 2024.

== Background ==
All three parties had high hopes for the election. The Nationals knew that they needed to increase their number of seats to hang onto Government (they had held a majority of one in the last Parliament, which had been increased from 82 seats to 89 for the 1986 election). The Liberals desperately needed to win back some of their losses from their disastrous performance in 1983, and Labor hoped to exploit disunity between the conservative parties to make gains.

The already malapportioned boundaries (the "Bjelkemander") had been redrawn earlier in the year in a manner which further advantaged the National Party.

Clive Palmer served as the media spokesman of National Party during its 1986 election campaign. Former Brisbane town clerk Tony Philbrick was the Nationals candidate for Sherwood, but failed to lodge his nomination by the midday deadline on 9 October 1986 and was unable to contest.

The Bjelke-Petersen Government won a commanding victory, winning an extra eight seats and thus increasing its majority. The Liberals gained two seats, but were still nowhere near making up for their 1983 losses. Labor lost two seats.

The 1986 election is significant for a number of reasons. It saw the National Party retain a majority of seats in the Parliament, and it was only the second election in Australian history (the other being the 1983 Queensland election) in which the National Party won enough seats to form Government in its own right.

More importantly, Sir Joh Bjelke-Petersen's victory gave him the confidence to launch the 'Joh for Canberra' campaign, which would play a major part in the 1987 federal election, and would later be a major factor in his undoing.

== Key dates ==
Date	Event
30 September 1986	Writs were issued by the Governor to proceed with an election.
9 October 1986	Close of nominations.
1 November 1986	Polling day, between the hours of 8am and 6pm.
1 December 1986	The Bjelke-Petersen Ministry was reconstituted.
8 January 1987	The writ was returned and the results formally declared.

== Electoral redistribution ==
A redistribution of electoral boundaries occurred in 1985.

The electorates of Ithaca, Kurilpa, Townsville North, Townsville South, Wavell, and Wynnum were abolished

The electorates of Bowen, Broadsound, Currumbin, Glass House, Logan, Manly, Moggill, Nerang, Nicklin, Springwood, Tablelands, Thuringowa, and Townsville East were created.

The redistribution increased the Legislative Assembly from 82 to 89 seats, adding 4 more in the South-East zone, 2 more in the Country zone, and 1 more in the Western and Far-Northern zone.

Zone	Electorates
Country (17)	Auburn, Barambah, Bowen, Broadsound, Burdekin, Burnett, Callide, Carnarvon, Condamine, Cunningham, Gympie, Hinchinbrook, Mirani, Mourilyan, Mulgrave, Tablelands, Warwick
Provincial Cities (13)	Barron River, Bundaberg, Cairns, Isis, Mackay, Maryborough, Port Curtis, Rockhampton, Rockhampton North, Thuringowa, Townsville, Townsville East, Whitsunday
South-East (51)	Albert, Archerfield, Ashgrove, Aspley, Brisbane Central, Bulimba, Caboolture, Chatsworth, Cooroora, Currumbin, Everton, Fassifern, Glass House, Greenslopes, Ipswich, Ipswich West, Landsborough, Lockyer, Logan, Lytton, Manly, Mansfield, Merthyr, Moggill, Mount Coot-tha, Mount Gravatt, Murrumba, Nerang, Nicklin, Nudgee, Nundah, Pine Rivers, Redcliffe, Redlands, Salisbury, Sandgate, Sherwood, Somerset, South Brisbane, South Coast, Southport, Springwood, Stafford, Surfers Paradise, Toowong, Toowoomba North, Toowoomba South, Windsor, Wolston, Woodridge, Yeronga
Western and Far-Northern (8)	Balonne, Cook, Flinders, Gregory, Mount Isa, Peak Downs, Roma, Warrego

Caboolture notionally became Labor-held, while Townsville notionally became National-held.

The changes resulted in 33 notionally Labor seats, 7 notionally Liberal seats, 48 notionally National seats, and 1 notionally Independent seat.

== Retiring members ==
=== Labor ===
- Jim Fouras (South Brisbane) – Lost preselection

=== National ===
- Brian Cahill (Aspley) – Lost preselection
- Bill Kaus (Mansfield)
- Neil Turner (Warrego)
- John Warner (Toowoomba South)
- Claude Wharton (Burnett)

=== Independent ===
- Lindsay Hartwig (Callide)
- Col Miller (Ithaca) – Elected for the Liberal Party

== Result ==
Queensland state election, 1 November 1986 Legislative Assembly << 1983–1989 >>
Enrolled voters	1,563,294				
Votes cast	1,426,478		Turnout	91.25%	–0.44%
Informal votes	30,903		Informal	2.17%	+0.70%
Summary of votes by party
Party	Primary votes	%	Swing	Seats	Change
Labor	577,062	41.35%	–2.63%	30	–2
Nationals	553,197	39.64%	+0.71%	49	+8
Liberals	230,310	16.50%	+1.62%	10	+2
Democrats	8,747	0.63%	–0.20%	0	±0
Independent	26,259	1.88%	+0.59%	0	–1
Total	1,395,575			89	
Two-party-preferred
National/Liberal		54.0%	+0.6%		
Labor		46.0%	–0.6%		

Popular vote
Labor	41.35%
Nationals	39.64%
Liberal	16.50%
Democrats	0.63%
Independents	1.88%

Seats
Nationals	55.06%
Labor	33.71%
Liberal	11.24%

== Seats changing hands ==
Seat	1985 Redistribution			Swing	1986 Election		
Seat	Party	Member	Margin	Swing	Margin	Member	Party
Ashgrove	Labor	Tom Veivers	2.60	–4.64	2.04	Alan Sherlock	Liberal
Callide	Independent	Lindsay Hartwig	9.30	–2.50	13.20	Di McCauley	National
Merthyr	Liberal	Don Lane¹	9.80	–15.84	6.04	Don Lane	National
Mount Isa	Labor	Bill Price	1.70	–4.44	2.74	Peter Beard	Liberal
Stafford	Labor	notional²	3.20	–7.66	4.46	Terry Gygar	Liberal
Toowong	National	Earle Bailey	2.80	–21.17	18.37	Denver Beanland	Liberal

- Members listed in italics did not recontest their seats.
- ¹ Don Lane was elected for the Liberal Party in 1983, but immediately resigned and joined the National Party to enter the ministry.
- ² Terry Gygar gained Stafford for the Liberal Party at the 1984 by-election. The Labor Party won the seat at the 1983 election.

== Post-election pendulum ==
National seats (49)
Marginal
Maryborough	Gilbert Alison	NAT	0.74%
Broadsound	Denis Hinton	NAT	1.96%
Pine Rivers	Yvonne Chapman	NAT	3.55%
Mulgrave	Max Menzel	NAT	3.71%
Warrego	Howard Hobbs	NAT	3.74%
Redlands	Paul Clauson	NAT	3.83%
Barron River	Martin Tenni	NAT	4.04%
Aspley	Beryce Nelson	NAT	4.11%
Greenslopes	Leisha Harvey	NAT	4.23%
Townsville	Tony Burreket	NAT	4.43%
Mansfield	Craig Sherrin	NAT	5.49%
Fairly Safe
Merthyr	Don Lane	NAT	6.04%
Springwood	Huan Fraser	NAT	6.18%
Mount Gravatt	Ian Henderson	NAT	6.69%
Glass House	Bill Newton	NAT	6.93%
Hinchinbrook	Ted Row	NAT	6.95%
Isis	Lin Powell	NAT	7.40%
Toowoomba North	Sandy McPhie	NAT	7.62%
Mirani	Jim Randell	NAT	8.29%
Tablelands	Tom Gilmore	NAT	8.70%
Currumbin	Leo Gately	NAT	8.88%
Whitsunday	Geoff Muntz	NAT	9.00%
Nerang	Tom Hynd	NAT	9.98%
Safe
Cooroora	Gordon Simpson	NAT	10.64%
Flinders	Bob Katter	NAT	10.85%
Nicklin	Brian Austin	NAT	10.93%
Landsborough	Mike Ahern	NAT	11.56%
Burdekin	Mark Stoneman	NAT	11.96%
Albert	Ivan Gibbs	NAT	13.13%
Fassifern	Kev Lingard	NAT	13.14%
Callide	Di McCauley	NAT	13.20%
Gregory	Bill Glasson	NAT	13.48%
Southport	Doug Jennings	NAT	13.70%
South Coast	Russ Hinze	NAT	13.73%
Somerset	Bill Gunn	NAT	13.99%
Auburn	Neville Harper	NAT	14.04%
Gympie	Len Stephan	NAT	14.80%
Burnett	Doug Slack	NAT	15.10%
Toowoomba South	Clive Berghofer	NAT	15.80%
Peak Downs	Vince Lester	NAT	17.00%
Carnarvon	Peter McKechnie	NAT	17.41%
Roma	Russell Cooper	NAT	19.55%
Very Safe
Surfers Paradise	Rob Borbidge	NAT	21.30%
Warwick	Des Booth	NAT	22.14%
Balonne	Don Neal	NAT	24.08%
Lockyer	Tony Fitzgerald	NAT	25.10%
Barambah	Joh Bjelke-Petersen	NAT	27.47%
Condamine	Brian Littleproud	NAT	28.49%
Cunningham	Tony Elliott	NAT	29.95%

Labor seats (30)
Marginal
Thuringowa	Ken McElligott	ALP	0.74%
Salisbury	Len Ardill	ALP	1.36%
Everton	Glen Milliner	ALP	1.46% v LIB
Mackay	Ed Casey	ALP	3.60%
Caboolture	Ken Hayward	ALP	3.73%
Mourilyan	Bill Eaton	ALP	4.10%
South Brisbane	Anne Warner	ALP	4.22%
Murrumba	Dean Wells	ALP	5.46%
Port Curtis	Bill Prest	ALP	5.90%
Fairly Safe
Cairns	Keith De Lacy	ALP	6.23%
Bundaberg	Clem Campbell	ALP	6.60%
Manly	Eric Shaw	ALP	6.70%
Logan	Wayne Goss	ALP	6.80%
Chatsworth	Terry Mackenroth	ALP	7.27%
Townsville East	Geoff Smith	ALP	7.50%
Wolston	Bob Gibbs	ALP	7.70%
Windsor	Pat Comben	ALP	7.70%
Rockhampton	Paul Braddy	ALP	8.20%
Brisbane Central	Brian Davis	ALP	9.10%
Safe
Rockhampton North	Les Yewdale	ALP	10.23%
Woodridge	Bill D'Arcy	ALP	11.00%
Ipswich West	David Underwood	ALP	11.20%
Bowen	Ken Smyth	ALP	12.47%
Bulimba	Ron McLean	ALP	13.00%
Nudgee	Ken Vaughan	ALP	13.10%
Ipswich	David Hamill	ALP	13.70%
Sandgate	Nev Warburton	ALP	13.70%
Lytton	Tom Burns	ALP	16.30%
Cook	Bob Scott	ALP	16.65%
Archerfield	Henry Palaszczuk	ALP	16.90%
Liberal seats (10)
Marginal
Ashgrove	Alan Sherlock	LIB	2.04%
Mount Isa	Peter Beard	LIB	2.74%
Stafford	Terry Gygar	LIB	4.46%
Nundah	William Knox	LIB	5.39%
Yeronga	Norm Lee	LIB	5.70%
Fairly Safe
Mount Coot-tha	Lyle Schuntner	LIB	6.20%
Redcliffe	Terry White	LIB	7.71%
Safe
Sherwood	Angus Innes	LIB	17.74%
Moggill	Bill Lickiss	LIB	18.08% v NAT
Toowong	Denver Beanland	LIB	18.37%

== Subsequent changes ==
- On 9 April 1987, National Party member Doug Jennings (Southport) died. At the by-election on 20 Jun 1987, Mick Veivers retained the seat for the National Party.
- On 1 December 1987, former National Premier Joh Bjelke-Petersen (Barambah) resigned after losing the leadership. At the by-election on 16 April 1988, Trevor Perrett gained the seat for the Citizens Electoral Council. Then on 16 December 1988, Trevor Perrett resigned and joined the National Party.
- On 24 May 1988, National Party member Russ Hinze (South Coast) resigned. At the by-election on 28 August 1988, Judy Gamin retained the seat for the National Party.
- On 27 September 1988, Eric Shaw (Manly) resigned from the Labor Party and sat as an independent.
- On 25 November 1988, Don Lane (Merthyr) resigned from the National Party and sat as an independent. On 20 January 1989, he resigned. At the by-election on 13 May 1989, Santo Santoro gained the seat for the Liberal Party.
- On 3 May 1989, Lin Powell (Isis) resigned from the National Party and sat as an independent. On 31 July 1989, he resigned. No by-election took place due to the proximity of the 1989 election.
- On 9 November 1989, Geoff Muntz (Whitsunday) resigned from the National Party and sat as an independent.

== See also ==
- Members of the Queensland Legislative Assembly, 1983–1986
- Members of the Queensland Legislative Assembly, 1986–1989
- Candidates of the Queensland state election, 1986
