= Members of the Queensland Legislative Assembly, 1983–1986 =

This is a list of members of the 44th Legislative Assembly of Queensland from 1983 to 1986, as elected at the 1983 state election held on 22 October 1983.

Name	Party	Electorate	Term in office
Hon Mike Ahern	National	Landsborough	1968–1990
Gilbert Alison	National	Maryborough	1971–1977, 1983–1989
Hon Brian Austin	National	Wavell	1977–1989
Earle Bailey	National	Toowong	1983–1986
Hon Sir Joh Bjelke-Petersen	National	Barambah	1947–1987
Des Booth	National	Warwick	1977–1992
Rob Borbidge	National	Surfers Paradise	1980–2001
Paul Braddy ^{[4]}	Labor	Rockhampton	1985–2001
Tom Burns	Labor	Lytton	1972–1996
Brian Cahill	National	Aspley	1983–1986
Clem Campbell	Labor	Bundaberg	1983–1998
Ed Casey	Labor	Mackay	1969–1995
Hon Yvonne Chapman	National	Pine Rivers	1983–1989
Paul Clauson ^{[5]}	National	Redlands	1985–1989
Pat Comben	Labor	Windsor	1983–1995
Russell Cooper	National	Roma	1983–2001
Bill D'Arcy	Labor	Woodridge	1972–1974, 1977–2000
Brian Davis	Labor	Brisbane Central	1969–1974, 1977–1989
Keith De Lacy	Labor	Cairns	1983–1998
Bill Eaton	Labor	Mourilyan	1980–1992
Tony Elliott	National	Cunningham	1974–2001
Tony Fitzgerald	National	Lockyer	1980–1998
Jim Fouras	Labor	South Brisbane	1977–1986, 1989–2006
Hon Ivan Gibbs	National	Albert	1974–1989
Bob Gibbs	Labor	Wolston	1977–1999
Hon Bill Glasson	National	Gregory	1974–1989
Hon John Goleby ^{[5]}	National	Redlands	1974–1985
Wayne Goss	Labor	Salisbury	1983–1998
Hon Bill Gunn	National	Somerset	1972–1992
Terry Gygar^{[2]}	Liberal	Stafford	1974–1983, 1984–1989
David Hamill	Labor	Ipswich	1983–2001
Hon Neville Harper	National	Auburn	1980–1992
Lindsay Hartwig	Independent	Callide	1972–1986
Leisha Harvey	National	Greenslopes	1983–1989
Ian Henderson	National	Mount Gravatt	1983–1989
Hon Russ Hinze	National	South Coast	1966–1988
Kevin Hooper ^{[1]}	Labor	Archerfield	1972–1984
Angus Innes	Liberal	Sherwood	1978–1990
Doug Jennings	National	Southport	1980–1987
Hon Bob Katter	National	Flinders	1974–1992
Bill Kaus	National	Mansfield	1966–1986
Hon Sir William Knox	Liberal	Nundah	1957–1989
Joe Kruger	Labor/Independent	Murrumba	1977–1986
Hon Don Lane	National	Merthyr	1971–1989
Hon Norm Lee	Liberal	Yeronga	1964–1989
Hon Vince Lester	National	Peak Downs	1974–2004
Hon Bill Lickiss	Liberal	Mount Coot-tha	1963–1989
Kev Lingard	National	Fassifern	1983–2009
Brian Littleproud	National	Condamine	1983–2001
Terry Mackenroth	Labor	Chatsworth	1977–2005
Ken McElligott	Labor	Townsville	1983–1998
Hon Peter McKechnie	National	Carnarvon	1974–1989
Ron McLean	Labor	Bulimba	1980–1992
Sandy McPhie	National	Toowoomba North	1983–1989
Max Menzel	National	Mulgrave	1980–1989
Col Miller	Liberal/Independent^{[3]}	Ithaca	1966–1986
Glen Milliner	Labor	Everton	1977–1998
Hon Geoff Muntz	National	Whitsunday	1980–1989
Dr Denis Murphy^{[2]}	Labor	Stafford	1983–1984
Don Neal	National	Balonne	1972–1992
Bill Newton	National	Caboolture	1983–1989
Henry Palaszczuk ^{[1]}	Labor	Archerfield	1984–2006
Hon Lin Powell	National	Isis	1974–1989
Bill Prest	Labor	Port Curtis	1976–1992
Bill Price	Labor	Mount Isa	1983–1986
Jim Randell	National	Mirani	1980–1994
Ted Row	National	Hinchinbrook	1972–1989
Bob Scott	Labor	Cook	1977–1989
Eric Shaw	Labor	Wynnum	1977–1989
Gordon Simpson	National	Cooroora	1974–1989
Geoff Smith	Labor	Townsville West	1980–1998
Len Stephan	National	Gympie	1979–2001
Mark Stoneman	National	Burdekin	1983–1998
Hon Martin Tenni	National	Barron River	1974–1989
Hon Neil Turner	National	Warrego	1974–1986, 1991–1998
David Underwood	Labor	Ipswich West	1977–1989
Ken Vaughan	Labor	Nudgee	1977–1995
Tom Veivers	Labor	Ashgrove	1983–1986
Nev Warburton	Labor	Sandgate	1977–1992
Anne Warner	Labor	Kurilpa	1983–1995
Hon John Warner	National	Toowoomba South	1974–1986
Hon Claude Wharton	National	Burnett	1960–1986
Terry White	Liberal	Redcliffe	1979–1989
Alex Wilson	Labor	Townsville South	1977–1986
Keith Wright ^{[4]}	Labor	Rockhampton	1969–1984
Les Yewdale	Labor	Rockhampton North	1972–1989

^{1} On 9 March 1984, the Labor member for Archerfield, Kevin Hooper, died. The Labor candidate Henry Palaszczuk won the resulting by-election on 19 May 1984.
^{2} On 21 June 1984, the Labor member for Stafford, Dr Denis Murphy died. The Liberal candidate Terry Gygar, the member for Stafford from 1974 to 1983, won the resulting by-election on 4 August 1984.
^{3} Col Miller, the member for Ithaca, was elected as a member of the Liberal Party, but resigned from the party in August 1984 and served out the remainder of his term as an independent.
^{4} On 5 November 1984, the Labor member for Rockhampton and Opposition Leader, Keith Wright, resigned from parliament in order to contest the Australian House of Representatives seat of Capricornia at the 1984 federal election. The Labor candidate Paul Braddy won the resulting by-election on 16 February 1985.
^{5} On 10 September 1985, the National member for Redlands, John Goleby, died in a farming accident. National Party candidate Paul Clauson won the resulting by-election on 2 November 1985.

== See also ==
- 1983 Queensland state election
- Premier: Joh Bjelke-Petersen (National Party) (1968–1987)
