= Electoral results for the district of Nerang =

Queensland, Australia, district election results

This is a list of electoral results for the electoral district of Nerang in Queensland state elections in Australia.

== Members for Nerang ==
Member	Party	Term
Tom Hynd	National	1986–1989
Ray Connor	Liberal	1989–2001

== Election results ==
=== Elections in the 1990s ===
1998 Queensland state election: Nerang
Party	Candidate	Votes	%	±%
Liberal	Ray Connor	10,336	38.65	−19.15
Labor	Peter Burke	7,406	27.70	−3.63
One Nation	John Coyle	6,719	25.13	+25.13
Greens	Jacquie Hughes	1,572	5.88	−4.98
Democrats	Lynne Grimsey	569	2.13	+2.13
Reform	Richard Balcke	138	0.52	+0.52
Total formal votes		26,740	98.41	+0.13
Informal votes		432	1.59	−0.13
Turnout		27,172	91.19	+1.24
Two-party-preferred result
Liberal	Ray Connor	14,177	61.00	−2.59
Labor	Peter Burke	9,064	39.00	+2.59
Liberal hold		Swing	−2.59	

1995 Queensland state election: Nerang
Party	Candidate	Votes	%	±%
Liberal	Ray Connor	13,343	57.80	+26.77
Labor	Elham Alamar	7,233	31.33	−8.80
Greens	Antony Bradshaw	2,508	10.86	+10.86
Total formal votes		23,084	98.28	+0.68
Informal votes		405	1.72	−0.68
Turnout		23,489	89.95	+0.09
Two-party-preferred result
Liberal	Ray Connor	14,156	63.59	+8.75
Labor	Elham Alamar	8,106	36.41	−8.75
Liberal hold		Swing	+8.75	

1992 Queensland state election: Nerang
Party	Candidate	Votes	%	±%
Labor	Tony Carman	7,883	40.1	−0.1
Liberal	Ray Connor	6,096	31.0	+1.7
National	Iona Abrahamson	4,828	24.6	−2.6
Independent	Chris Ivory	836	4.3	+4.3
Total formal votes		19,643	97.6	
Informal votes		484	2.4	
Turnout		20,127	89.9	
Two-party-preferred result
Liberal	Ray Connor	10,274	54.8	−1.8
Labor	Tony Carman	8,462	45.2	+1.8
Liberal hold		Swing	−1.8	

=== Elections in the 1980s ===
1989 Queensland state election: Nerang
Party	Candidate	Votes	%	±%
Labor	Robert Lee	10,828	45.6	+12.8
Liberal	Ray Connor	6,499	27.4	+9.4
National	Tom Hynd	5,832	24.6	−19.2
Independent	Harry Howard	585	2.5	+2.5
Total formal votes		23,744	96.3	−0.9
Informal votes		918	3.7	+0.9
Turnout		24,662	88.5	+0.2
Two-party-preferred result
Liberal	Ray Connor	12,210	51.4	+51.4
Labor	Robert Lee	11,534	48.6	+8.5
Liberal gain from National		Swing	+51.4	

1986 Queensland state election: Nerang
Party	Candidate	Votes	%	±%
National	Tom Hynd	7,509	43.8	
Labor	Marjorie Thompson	5,625	32.8	
Liberal	Russell Stuart	3,079	18.0	
Democrats	Tony Kennedy	625	3.7	
Independent	Methven Sparks	291	1.7	
Total formal votes		17,129	97.2	
Informal votes		497	2.8	
Turnout		17,626	88.3	
Two-party-preferred result
National	Tom Hynd	10,256	59.9	+3.3
Labor	Marjorie Thompson	6,873	40.1	−3.3
National hold		Swing	+3.3	
