= Electoral results for the district of Traeger =

Queensland, Australia, district election results

This is a list of electoral results for the electoral district of Traeger in Queensland state elections.

== Members for Traeger ==
Member	Party	Term
Robbie Katter	Katter's Australian	2017–present

== Election results ==
=== Elections in the 2020s ===
2024 Queensland state election: Traeger
Party	Candidate	Votes	%	±%
Katter's Australian	Robbie Katter	9,831	49.3	−9.5
Liberal National	Yvonne Tunney	5,039	25.3	+9.2
Labor	Georgia Heath	3,024	15.2	−5.4
One Nation	Peter Rawle	1,349	6.8	+6.8
Greens	Louise Raynaud	689	3.4	+1.2
Total formal votes		19,932	96.6	
Informal votes		700	3.4	
Turnout		20,632		
Two-candidate-preferred result
Katter's Australian	Robbie Katter	12,703	63.7	−11.0
Liberal National	Yvonne Tunney	7,229	36.3	+11.0
Katter's Australian hold		Swing	-11.0	

2020 Queensland state election: Traeger
Party	Candidate	Votes	%	±%
Katter's Australian	Robbie Katter	12,047	58.85	−7.37
Labor	James Bambrick	4,219	20.61	+4.02
Liberal National	Marnie Smith	3,284	16.04	+5.99
Greens	Kristian Horvath	460	2.25	+0.10
Independent	Craig Scriven	277	1.35	−0.31
United Australia	Phillip Collins	182	0.89	+0.89
Total formal votes		20,469	97.00	+0.95
Informal votes		633	3.00	−0.95
Turnout		21,102	79.97	−2.07
Notional two-party-preferred count (Note: Estimate two-party preferred count by Antony Green.)
Liberal National	Marnie Smith		51.20	
Labor	James Bambrick		48.80	
Two-candidate-preferred result
Katter's Australian	Robbie Katter	15,295	74.72	−3.77
Labor	James Bambrick	5,174	25.28	+3.77
Katter's Australian hold		Swing	−3.77	

=== Elections in the 2010s ===
2017 Queensland state election: Traeger
Party	Candidate	Votes	%	±%
Katter's Australian	Robbie Katter	13,638	66.2	+17.9
Labor	Danielle Slade	3,416	16.6	−1.7
Liberal National	Ron Bird	2,071	10.1	−18.5
Independent	Sarah Isaacs	683	3.3	+3.3
Greens	Peter Relph	443	2.2	+0.2
Independent	Craig Scriven	342	1.7	+1.7
Total formal votes		20,593	96.0	−2.3
Informal votes		847	4.0	+2.3
Turnout		21,440	82.0	−1.2
Two-candidate-preferred result
Katter's Australian	Robbie Katter	16,163	78.5	+12.4
Labor	Danielle Slade	4,430	21.5	+21.5
Katter's Australian hold		Swing	+12.4	
