= Peter Beard (disambiguation) =

Peter Beard (1938–2020) was an American photographer and artist.

Peter Beard may also refer to:

- Peter Beard (politician) (born 1935), Australian politician
- Peter Beard, mayor of Reading in 2008, England
