= Ray Connor =

Australian politician

Member of the Queensland Legislative Assembly for Nerang
- In office 2 December 1989 – 17 February 2001
- Preceded by: Tom Hynd
- Succeeded by: Seat abolished

Personal details
- Born: Raymond Thomas Connor; 4 December 1954 (age 71) Sydney, New South Wales, Australia
- Party: Liberal Party
- Occupation: Businessman

Raymond Thomas "Ray" Connor (born 4 December 1954) is a former Australian politician. He was the Liberal member for Nerang in the Legislative Assembly of Queensland from 1989 to 2001.

Connor was born in Sydney, and was a businessman prior to his election. In 1992 he was appointed to the Coalition front bench as Shadow Minister for Business, Industry and Regional Development. Following the Coalition's 1995 election win, he became Minister for Public Works and Housing until 1997, when he left the ministry. Connor's seat was abolished in 2001 and he unsuccessfully contested the new seat of Mudgeeraba.

Parliament of Queensland
Preceded by Tom Hynd	Member for Nerang; 1989–2001	Succeeded by Abolished
