= Alec Inch =

Australian politician (1915–1994)

Member of the Queensland Legislative Assembly for Burke
- In office 28 May 1960 – 27 May 1972
- Preceded by: New seat
- Succeeded by: Seat abolished

Member of the Queensland Legislative Assembly for Mount Isa
- In office 27 May 1972 – 6 December 1974
- Preceded by: New seat
- Succeeded by: Angelo Bertoni

Personal details
- Born: Alexander James Inch; 23 October 1915 Charters Towers, Queensland, Australia
- Died: 3 July 1994 (aged 78) Townsville, Queensland, Australia
- Party: Labor
- Spouse: Rita Alice Morgans (m.1938)
- Occupation: Engine driver

Alexander James Inch (23 October 1915 – 3 July 1994) was an Engine driver and member of the Queensland Legislative Assembly.

== Early days ==
Inch was born at Charters Towers, Queensland, to Alexander William and his wife Elizabeth Genevieve (née Lacey) and was educated at St Columbus Primary School and Mount Carmel Christian Brothers in Charters Towers. During the depression, Inch worked in the pastoral industry and also doing railway maintenance. By the early 1940s, he had become a 1st class engine driver in Innisfail and in the 1950s he was a 1st class electrical and general winding-engine driver working for Mount Isa Mines.

== Political career ==
At the 1960 election the seat of Burke was reincarnated and Inch, standing for the Labor Party, won the seat. He held the seat until 1972 when it was once again abolished and Inch moved to the new seat of Mount Isa but did not contest the seat in 1974.

== Personal life ==
On the 17 Dec 1938, Inch married Rita Alice Morgans and together had one son. He died in Townsville 1994.

Parliament of Queensland
New seat	Member for Burke; 1960–1972	Abolished
New seat	Member for Mount Isa; 1972–1974	Succeeded by Angelo Bertoni
