= Betty Kiernan =

Australian politician

Member of the Queensland Legislative Assembly for Mount Isa
- In office 9 September 2006 – 23 March 2012
- Preceded by: Tony McGrady
- Succeeded by: Robbie Katter

Personal details
- Born: 27 August 1955 (age 70) Mount Isa, Queensland, Australia
- Party: Labor
- Occupation: Company director

Betty Margaret Kiernan (born 27 August 1955) is an Australian politician. Born in Mount Isa, Queensland, she was an electorate officer and corporate manager before entering politics, and had served on Cloncurry Shire Council from 1981 to 1990. A member of the Labor Party, she was elected to the Legislative Assembly of Queensland in 2006 as the member for Mount Isa.

She lost her seat in the 2012 state election amid Labor's collapse that year, being pushed into third place on the primary vote, behind winner Robbie Katter of Katter's Australian Party and the Liberal National candidate. Kiernan later went on to become the facilities manager at the Laura Johnson Home for the Aged.

Parliament of Queensland
Preceded by Tony McGrady	Member for Mount Isa; 2006–2012	Succeeded by Robbie Katter
