= Angelo Bertoni =

Australian politician (1933–2021)

The Honourable Angelo Bertoni

Member of the Queensland Legislative Assembly for Mount Isa
- In office 7 December 1974 – 22 October 1983
- Preceded by: Alec Inch
- Succeeded by: Bill Price

Personal details
- Born: Angelo Pietro Dante Bertoni; 7 November 1933 Ingham, Queensland, Australia
- Died: 31 March 2021 (aged 87)
- Party: National Party
- Spouse: Fay Joan McEwen
- Education: University of Queensland
- Occupation: Pharmacist

Angelo Pietro Dante Bertoni (7 November 1933 – 31 March 2021) was an Australian politician who was a member of the Queensland Legislative Assembly.

== Biography ==
Bertoni was born at Ingham, Queensland, the son of Pietro Bertoni and his wife Rosalinda (née Ditali) He was educated at Ingham Roman Catholic School and Mount Carmel College in Charters Towers before attending the University of Queensland where he earned a diploma in pharmaceutics. He owned a pharmacy in Brisbane from 1956 until 1961 before moving to Mount Isa where he also owned a pharmacy.

He married Fay Joan McEwen and together had five sons and two daughters.

== Public career ==
Bertoni was a member of the Mount Isa City Council, including the city's Mayor from 1973 to 1975.

He won the seat of Mount Isa for the National Party at the 1974 Queensland state election and held it till his defeat in 1983. He was the Minister for Health for three months in 1983.

Parliament of Queensland
Preceded by Alec Inch	Member for Mount Isa; 1974–1983	Succeeded by Bill Price
