= Getano Lui (Jnr) =

Indigenous Australian community leader

Getano Lui Jnr AM
- Occupation: community leader

Getano Belford Lui Jnr AM, is a Torres Strait Islander Australian community leader.

== Career ==
Lui is Councillor on the Torres Strait Islands Regional Council (TSIRC) (State) and Deputy Chair and Member for Iama (Yam Island), and also on the Board of the Torres Strait Regional Authority (TRSA) where he served as inaugural chair. Lui has also been Chair of the Yam Island Community Council, Islanders Board of Industry and Service and Island Coordination Council.

Lui was a National Party candidate for the electoral district of Cook at the 1986 Queensland election. He was not elected.

In 1993, Lui delivered one of the annual series of Australian Broadcasting Corporation Boyer Lectures called "Voices of the Land".

== Recognition ==
As part of the 1980 New Year Honours, Lui was appointed as a Member of the Order of the British Empire (MBE).

Lui was subsequently made a Member of the Order of Australia in the 1994 Australia Day Honours in recognition of his service to the Torres Strait community.

In 2001, Lui was awarded the Centenary Medal for distinguished service through his work on the Yam Island Council.

Lui was named as a Queensland Great in 2024.

== Personal ==
The son of Getano Lui Snr, Lui resides on Yam Island.

== Honours and awards ==
- 1994 Member of the Order of Australia for service to the Torres Strait Islander Community.
- 2001 Centenary Medal for distinguished service through the Yam Island Council
