= Tony McGrady =

Australian politician

The Hon Tony McGrady AM

Speaker of the Queensland Legislative Assembly
- In office 9 August 2005 – 9 October 2006
- Preceded by: Ray Hollis
- Succeeded by: Mike Reynolds
- Constituency: Mount Isa

Mayor of Mount Isa
- In office 2012–2016
- In office 1985–1989

Member of the Queensland Legislative Assembly for Mount Isa
- In office 2 December 1989 – 9 September 2006
- Preceded by: Peter Beard
- Succeeded by: Betty Kiernan

Personal details
- Born: Anthony McGrady; 28 March 1944 (age 82) Liverpool, England
- Party: Labor

Anthony McGrady (born 28 March 1944) is an Australian politician. He was a Member of the Queensland Legislative Assembly and Mayor of the City of Mount Isa.

== Early life ==
Born in Liverpool in the United Kingdom, he moved to Mount Isa in Queensland, Australia. He is one of 4 children of Rose McGrady (nee Cain) from Bootle. He was raised in Netherton with siblings, Moira, Vincent and Colette.

== Politics ==
From 1985 to 1989 McGrady served as mayor in the City of Mount Isa.

A member of the Labor Party, he was elected to the Legislative Assembly of Queensland in 1989 as the member for Mount Isa. He was Minister for Mines and Energy 1998–2001, moving to Police and Corrective Services in 2001 and to State Development and Innovation in 2004. On 9 August 2005, he was elected Speaker of the Legislative Assembly, succeeding Ray Hollis, who resigned from parliament. McGrady was Speaker until the next election was called on 9 October 2006, after which he retired from state politics.

At the 2012 Queensland local government elections, he was again elected Mayor of Mount Isa, until his retirement in 2016.

Parliament of Queensland
Preceded by Ray Hollis	Speaker of the Legislative Assembly; 2005–2006	Succeeded by Mike Reynolds
Preceded by Peter Beard	Member for Mount Isa; 1989–2006	Succeeded by Betty Kiernan
