= 1985 Rockhampton state by-election =

A by-election was held in the Legislative Assembly of Queensland seat of Rockhampton on 16 February 1985. It was triggered by the resignation of sitting Labor member Keith Wright.

The seat was retained by the Labor Party with the election of candidate Paul Braddy.

== Background ==
Keith Wright was first elected to state parliament at the 1969 state election as the Labor member for Rockhampton South, retaining the seat at the 1972 state election when the district was renamed Rockhampton. Wright held Rockhampton continuously thereafter, becoming Leader of the Opposition on 20 October 1982. After leading his party to defeat at the 1983 state election, at which his own support in Rockhampton had slipped by 6% despite statewide gains by his party, Wright was replaced as leader on 29 August 1984 by Nev Warburton.

Wright resigned from state parliament on 5 November 1984 to contest the 1984 federal election. The following month he was elected as member for the overlapping federal seat of Capricornia.

The Nationals made a determined effort to win the seat, as it would extend their base in the provincial cities zone. The by-election coincided with a major industrial dispute within the state's power industry between the government and the trade union movement.

== Timeline ==
Date	Event
5 November 1984	Keith Wright resigned, vacating the seat of Rockhampton.
25 January 1985	Writs were issued by the Speaker to proceed with a by-election.
1 February 1985	Close of nominations and draw of ballot papers.
16 February 1985	Polling day, between the hours of 8am and 6pm.
11 March 1985	The writ was returned and the results formally declared.

== Results ==
Normally a safe seat for the Labor Party, it was retained by new candidate Paul Braddy. The result was nonetheless a boost for new Labor leader Nev Warburton and a blow to the governing Nationals, who might have hoped that the ongoing industrial dispute between the government and the state's power industry workers would hurt the Labor Party.

Rockhampton state by-election, 1985
Party	Candidate	Votes	%	±%
Labor	Paul Braddy	8,409	58.98	+1.77
National	Col Webber	5,849	41.02	–0.92
Total formal votes		14,258	97.87	–1.13
Informal votes		310	2.13	+1.13
Turnout		14,568	87.77	–5.24
Labor hold		Swing	+1.77	

== See also ==
- List of Queensland state by-elections
