= Robbie Katter =

Australian politician (born 1977)

Robbie Katter MP
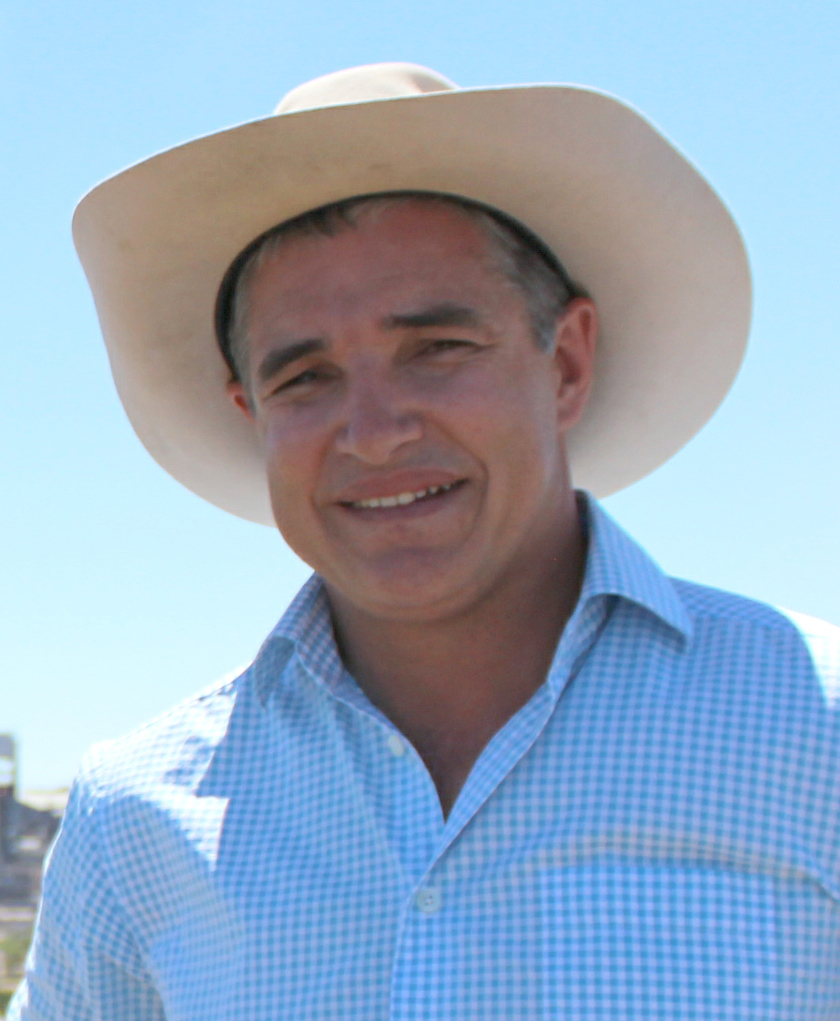
- Katter in 2015

Leader of Katter's Australian Party
- Incumbent
- Assumed office 3 February 2020
- Deputy: Nick Dametto
- Preceded by: Bob Katter
- Interim; 26 April 2012 – 29 November 2012
- Deputy: Shane Knuth; Aiden McLindon
- Succeeded by: Ray Hopper

Member of the Queensland Legislative Assembly for Traeger Mount Isa (2012–2017)
- Incumbent
- Assumed office 24 March 2012
- Preceded by: Betty Kiernan

Personal details
- Born: Robert Carl Ignatius Katter; 3 March 1977 (age 49) Townsville, Queensland, Australia
- Party: Katter's Australian (since 2011)
- Other political affiliations: National (before 2001); Independent (2001–2011)
- Spouse(s): Stacey Milner (m. 2005; div. 2009) Daisy Hatfield (m. 2017)
- Relations: Katter family
- Parent(s): Bob Katter Jr. Susan O'Rourke
- Relatives: Bob Katter Sr. (grandfather); Carl Katter (half–uncle); Alex Douglas (cousin)
- Education: St. Columba Catholic College; Queensland University of Technology
- Occupation: Politician; property valuer
- Profession: Farmer; labourer; real estate
- Website: robbiekatter.com.au
- Other offices: 2017–present: Member; Agriculture, Environment, State Development & Infrastructure Committee (Qld); 2012–2015: Parliamentary Secretary; 2008–2012: Mount Isa City Council

Robert Carl Ignatius Katter (born 3 March 1977) is an Australian politician. He serves as the member of the Legislative Assembly of Queensland for Traeger, having previously represented Mount Isa from 2012 to 2017. He is the leader of Katter's Australian Party, having taken over from his father Bob Katter in February 2020.

== Biography ==
=== Early life ===
Katter was born on 3 March 1977 in North Queensland. His father is Bob Katter, the federal member for Kennedy and founder of Katter's Australian Party, and his grandfather Bob Katter Sr. was also a federal MP. He received a Bachelor of Applied Science in Property Economics from the Queensland University of Technology.

=== Early career ===
Katter started his career as a mine worker in Mount Isa, before working as a property valuer for fifteen years and running a small business in Mount Isa.

=== Political career (2012–present) ===
He won Mount Isa at the 2012 state election, pushing Labor incumbent Betty Kiernan into third place. He capitalised on his family's name recognition in the area. Mount Isa was virtually coextensive with the western portion of his father's federal seat of Kennedy, and much of the eastern portion of the seat was once part of the elder Katter's old state seat of Flinders.

After his election to the Legislative Assembly, he became Queensland leader of his father's party, but on 29 November 2012, it was announced that he had been succeeded as leader by Ray Hopper, and would become the party's "parliamentary secretary". Following Hopper's defeat at the 2015 election, Katter once again became state leader.

The state electorate of Mount Isa was abolished in 2017, and Katter followed most of his constituents into the new seat of Traeger. The new seat was essentially the northern, more urbanised portion of Katter's former seat, and is based on Mount Isa. The seat as created is a safe KAP seat, and Katter won it comfortably.

He serves on the boards of the Laura Johnson Home, a retirement home, and the Southern Gulf Catchments, an environmental organisation.

In February 2020, he was appointed leader of the Katter's Australian Party.

At the 2020 Queensland state election Katter retained his seat of Traeger with 58.85 per cent of first preference votes and 74.72 per cent of the two-party-preferred vote.

At the 2024 Queensland state election Katter retained his seat of Traeger.

== Political views ==
Robbie Katter is an agrarian socialist, beginning a speech in the Queensland Parliament in 2017 by saying "The members opposite refer to agrarian socialism as though it is a bad thing. I wear it like a badge."

In 2020, Katter called for the federal government to buy back Qantas Airlines.

In April 2022, Katter said he would move a bill to ban transgender athletes from women's sport in the state. In May 2022, he proposed a motion which was voted down 49 votes to 33. The opposition Liberal National Party of Queensland voted with him.

Katter advocates North Queensland statehood. On 22 May 2024, Katter introduced a motion in the Queensland Parliament that would separate North Queensland from the rest of the state, and called for a Referendum to be held in the North to allow residents to have their say on the matter. Katter claimed that the region was being neglected by the state's South East, particularly in the areas of investment, infrastructure and disaster relief.

Katter is anti-abortion and made a pledge to introduce a Private Member's Bill into the post-election 2024 Queensland Parliament.

== Personal life ==
Katter is married to Daisy (née Hatfield), a former journalist. They met when Daisy was working for WIN Television in Townsville on an assignment to interview him. They have four daughters, born in 2020, 2021, 2023 and 2025.

In 2018, Katter gained a pilot licence, a four-year process during which Katter taught himself. He stated that it was necessary to properly represent his large rural electorate, with his home in Mount Isa and electorate office in Charters Towers being 800 kilometres apart. In May 2023, Katter damaged his 1985 Mooney M20 plane by landing without lowering the landing gear at Mount Isa Airport. Katter was unhurt in the incident. In August 2025, Katter again crash landed his 1985 plane at Mount Isa Airport, accidentally barrel-rolling his plane on approach to the airport's runaway. His wife Daisy, pregnant with his fourth child, and his parliamentary chief of staff Cameron Parker, were aboard the plane with Katter, but all passengers were uninjured.

== See also ==
- Political families of Australia

Parliament of Queensland
Preceded by Betty Kiernan	Member for Mount Isa; 2012–2017	Abolished
New seat	Member for Traeger; 2017–present	Incumbent
Party political offices
Preceded by Aidan McLindon	Leader of Katter's Australian Party in Queensland; 2012	Succeeded by Ray Hopper
Preceded by Ray Hopper	Leader of Katter's Australian Party in Queensland; 2015–present	Incumbent
