= Tony Burreket =

Australian politician (1934–2016)

Member of the Queensland Legislative Assembly for Townsville
- In office 1 November 1986 – 2 December 1989
- Preceded by: Ken McElligott
- Succeeded by: Ken Davies

Personal details
- Born: Anthony Burreket; 6 July 1934 Paddington, New South Wales, Australia
- Died: 7 October 2016 (aged 82) Liverpool, New South Wales, Australia
- Party: National Party
- Spouse: Judith Margaret Manson (m.1970)
- Occupation: Soldier, Real estate agent, Small business owner

Anthony Burreket (6 July 1934 – 7 October 2016) was an Australian politician. He was a member of the Queensland Legislative Assembly from 1986 to 1989, representing the seat of Townsville for the National Party.

== Early life ==
Burreket was born on 6 July 1934 in Paddington, New South Wales. His parents Rose (née Karum) and Abraham Burreket were Maronite Catholics who immigrated to Australia from Lebanon in the late 1920s. His mother was originally from Hasroun.

Burreket was orphaned at the age of three and spent eleven years in a Christian orphanage. Self-educated, he matriculated with honours from Victoria Correspondence School and gained a primary teachers' certificate from Frankston Teachers College. He joined the Australian Army in 1951 and served in Borneo and Malaysia in 1964 and 1965. He retired as an education officer in the Army in 1972 and became a real estate agent and developer.

== Politics ==
Burreket served on the Townsville City Council from 1985 to 1988. He was active in a number of community organisations including as coordinator of the Australian Red Cross's doorknock appeal.

Burreket was a member of the National Party and at the 1986 state election was elected to the Queensland Legislative Assembly, defeating the incumbent Australian Labor Party (ALP) member Ken McElligott in the seat of Townsville. He was a supporter of party leader Mike Ahern in the leadership conflict against Russell Cooper. He served on a number of committees in parliament, but was defeated after a single term at the 1989 state election.

== Death ==
Burreket died on 7 October 2016, at the age of 82.

Parliament of Queensland
| Preceded by Ken McElligott | Member for Townsville; 1986–1989 | Succeeded by Ken Davies |
