= 1988 South Coast state by-election =

A by-election was held in the Legislative Assembly of Queensland seat of South Coast on 28 August 1988. It was triggered by the resignation of sitting National Party member Russ Hinze.

The seat was retained by the National Party with the election of candidate Judy Gamin.

== Background ==
Russ Hinze was first elected to parliament at the 1966 state election as the Country Party member for South Coast. In 1974, he became a minister in the government of Joh Bjelke-Petersen, holding several portfolios up until the end of Bjelke-Petersen's reign in December 1987. Like Bjelke-Petersen, Hinze was disgraced by the revelations of the Fitzgerald Inquiry, a probe into government and police corruption. He was therefore left out of the new government led by Premier Mike Ahern. Hinze became a fierce critic of Ahern before resigning his seat on 24 May 1988.

Due to recent losses by the Nationals at the Barambah state and Groom federal by-elections, winning South Coast was seen as critical by the Nationals.

== Candidates ==
The by-election attracted a field of ten candidates. With South Coast being a reliably conservative electorate, the two most notable candidates were therefore those of the National Party and the Liberal Party; businesswomen and regional party vice-president Judy Gamin and Bob Quinn respectively. Lindsay Hartwig, formerly a National Party and independent member for the rural seat of Callide, stood on behalf of the far right Citizens Electoral Council. Philip Black, a supporter of Joh Bjelke-Petersen and former Young Nationals president who had been expelled from the National Party, ran as an independent with Sir Joh's verbal endorsement. Bruce Whiteside, founder of the anti-Japanese investment group "Heart of a Nation", also nominated, although his New Zealand citizenship posed a public perception problem for his campaign given the number of New Zealand companies buying up land in the Gold Coast.

== Results ==
Judy Gamin of the National Party prevailed narrowly over the Liberal Party's Bob Quinn.

South Coast state by-election, 1988
Party	Candidate	Votes	%	±%
National	Judy Gamin	5,716	30.43	−19.26
Liberal	Bob Quinn	5,426	28.89	+8.86
Labor	Dallas Watson	4,293	22.85	−7.42
Independent	Philip Black	1,488	7.92	+7.92
Citizens Electoral Council	Lindsay Hartwig	589	3.14	+3.14
Democrats	Anthony William Kennedy	571	2.51	+2.51
Australian Independent	Bruce Whiteside	420	2.30	+2.30
ASSP	Ennis Groom	225	1.20	+1.20
Independent	James Drabsch	83	0.44	+0.44
Independent	John Kachel	61	0.32	+0.32
Total formal votes		18,784	95.27	−2.75
Informal votes		932	4.73	+2.75
Turnout		19,716	77.60	−10.22
Two-candidate-preferred result
National	Judy Gamin	9,464	50.38	
Liberal	Bob Quinn	9,320	49.62	
National hold		Swing		

== Aftermath ==
Seeking a second term as the member for South Coast, Judy Gamin was defeated at the 1989 state election by Bob Quinn who was once again standing as the Liberal Party candidate.

== See also ==
- List of Queensland state by-elections
