= 1987 Southport state by-election =

A by-election was held in the Legislative Assembly of Queensland seat of Southport on 20 June 1987. It was triggered by the death of sitting National Party member Doug Jennings on 9 April 1987, which until the death of Duncan Pegg in 2021, remained the most recent time a sitting Queensland MP has died. The seat was formerly a Liberal seat until 1980, and the by-election took place in the midst of the Joh for Canberra push. However, the campaign dwelled almost entirely on local matters.

== Candidates ==
The Nationals selected Mick Veivers, a rugby league identity and acknowledged Sir Joh supporter, while the Liberals selected Keith Thompson, a City of Gold Coast alderman. Perennial independent candidate William Aabraham-Steer, who had contested McPherson and Moncrieff at various federal elections, also contested.

== Results ==
The seat was retained by the National Party with the election of candidate and Australian former rugby league international Mick Veivers.

Southport state by-election, 1987
Party	Candidate	Votes	%	±%
National	Mick Veivers	7,164	46.20	−4.72
Liberal	Keith Thompson	3,928	25.33	+1.80
Labor	Robert Lee	3,806	24.54	+2.26
Independent	Jim McDonagh	490	3.16	+3.16
Independent	William Aabraham-Steer	118	0.76	+0.76
Total formal votes		15,506	97.93	−0.28
Informal votes		327	2.07	+0.28
Turnout		15,833	74.52	−14.56
Two-party-preferred result
National	Mick Veivers	10,530	67.91	
Labor	Robert Lee	4976	32.09	
National hold		Swing		

== See also ==
- List of Queensland state by-elections
