= Earle Bailey =

Australian politician (1941–2023)

Earle Bailey OAM

Member of the Queensland Legislative Assembly for Toowong
- In office 22 October 1983 – 1 November 1986
- Preceded by: Ian Prentice
- Succeeded by: Denver Beanland

Personal details
- Born: Earle Wilfred Bailey; 5 October 1941 Melbourne, Victoria, Australia
- Died: 8 July 2023 (aged 81) Queensland, Australia
- Party: National Party
- Spouse: Penelope Edith Reilly (m.1966)
- Relations: Sir Earle Page (grandfather)
- Occupation: Barrister

Earle Wilfred Bailey OAM (5 October 1941 – 8 July 2023) was an Australian politician. He was a member of the Queensland Legislative Assembly from 1983 to 1986.

== Early life ==
Earle Wilfred Bailey was born in Melbourne, Victoria on 5 October 1941, the son of W.B. Bailey-Tart and his wife Mary Ethel (née Page). His maternal grandfather was Sir Earle Page, 11th Prime Minister of Australia in 1939.

Bailey was educated at South Grafton Primary School, The Armidale School, and Brisbane Grammar School.

After finishing his education, Bailey worked as a journalist and film producer.

On 28 May 1966, Bailey married Penelope Edith Reilly. The couple had a son and a daughter.

== Politics ==
Representing the National Party, he was the member for Toowong in the Queensland Legislative Assembly from 1983 until his defeat in 1986.

== Later life and death ==
Bailey was awarded the Medal of the Order of Australia in the 2001 New Year's Honours List for his services to the community of the Port Douglas region through local government, tourism, and developing the radio and television industries.

Earle Bailey died in Queensland on 8 July 2023, at the age of 81.

Parliament of Queensland
Preceded by Ian Prentice	Member for Toowong; 1983–1986	Succeeded by Denver Beanland
