= Bill Price (politician) =

Australian politician

Member of the Queensland Legislative Assembly for Mount Isa
- In office 22 October 1983 – 1 Nov 1986
- Preceded by: Angelo Bertoni
- Succeeded by: Peter Beard

Personal details
- Born: William Norris James Price; 11 May 1935 (age 91) Brisbane, Queensland, Australia
- Party: Labor
- Spouse: Elizabeth Ann Bach (m.1964)
- Education: University of Queensland
- Occupation: School teacher

William Norris James Price (born 11 May 1935) was a member of the Queensland Legislative Assembly.

== Biography ==
Price was born in Brisbane, Queensland, the son of John Benedict Price and his wife Mary Helen Jessie Brodie (née Norris) He was educated at St Finbarr's in Ashgrove, Marist College Ashgrove and Nudgee College before receiving a Certificate of Teaching at Kelvin Grove Teachers College and then attended the University of Queensland. He then taught on the Darling Downs before heading overseas to teach in Great Britain, Turkey and Canada. After teaching he founded and operated a successful transport company (Priceways), was local Council member, a restaurant owner and service station proprietor. In 1954 he did his national Service, stationed at the RAAF base at Amberley in Queensland.

On the 4 July 1964 Price married Elizabeth Ann Bach and together had three sons and two daughters.

== Public career ==
Price, a member of the Labor Party, defeated Angelo Bertoni to win the seat of Mount Isa in the Queensland Legislative Assembly at the 1983 state election. He held it for one three-year term before being defeated by Peter Beard at the 1986 state election.

Parliament of Queensland
Preceded by Angelo Bertoni	Member for Mount Isa; 1983–1986	Succeeded by Peter Beard
