= Tom Hynd =

Australian politician (1930–2011)

Member of the Queensland Legislative Assembly for Nerang
- In office 1 November 1986 – 2 December 1989
- Preceded by: New seat
- Succeeded by: Ray Connor

Personal details
- Born: Thomas Simpson Hynd; 6 July 1930 Sydney, New South Wales, Australia
- Died: 20 October 2011 (aged 81) Gold Coast, Queensland, Australia
- Party: National Party
- Spouse: Phyllis Lyle Bullard
- Occupation: Master builder

Thomas Simpson Hynd (6 July 1930 – 20 October 2011) was an Australian businessman and politician. He was a National Party member of the Queensland Legislative Assembly from 1986 to 1989, representing the electorate of Nerang.

Hynd was born in Sydney, the son of a coalminer. He attended Chatswood Primary School, Mosman High School and Gore Hill Technical College. He trained as a master builder, and later opened TS Hynd Pty Ltd, a business specialising in electronic doors. He was a prominent business figure on the Gold Coast, and Alex Douglas claimed that "he installed probably half of the roller doors on houses that were built". He was actively involved in the National Party, and had been the vice-president of its south-east zone.

Hynd was elected to the Legislative Assembly at the 1986 state election for Nerang, a new electorate created with the enlargement of parliament that year. Hynd was an enthusiastic supporter of Premier Joh Bjelke-Petersen, and endorsed his Joh for Canberra campaign, having been quoted in 1987 as stating: "It would be the greatest thing ever to happen to Australia if Joh was to be Prime Minister . . . He is just the man to lead this country out of the wilderness. I would walk from here to George Street for Joh to be PM." One issue which Hynd took up in parliament with lasting effect was the cause of those living in caravan parks, as he first issued a green paper outlining issues in the area, and then successfully introduced legislation to protect their rights. He was promoted to Deputy Government Whip in September 1989, two months before the 1989 state election. He was defeated at that election by Liberal candidate Ray Connor, and did not run for office again.

In retirement, he was actively involved in the Rotary Club, and made wooden toys and sold them at markets in order to raise money for charity. He died on the Gold Coast on 20 October 2011.

Parliament of Queensland
Preceded by New seat	Member for Nerang; 1986–1989	Succeeded by Ray Connor
