= Ron McLean (politician) =

Australian politician

Member of the Queensland Legislative Assembly for Bulimba
- In office 29 November 1980 – 19 September 1992
- Preceded by: Jack Houston
- Succeeded by: Pat Purcell

Personal details
- Born: Ronald Thomas McLean; 28 December 1938 Townsville, Queensland, Australia
- Died: 13 February 1999 (aged 60) Landsborough, Queensland, Australia
- Party: Labor
- Occupation: Waterside worker, Carpenter

Ronald Thomas McLean (28 December 1938 – 13 February 1999) was an Australian politician. He was a Member of the Queensland Legislative Assembly.

He was born in Townsville to Kenneth Murdock McLean and Edna May, née Blee. He attended Bulimba State School and then Brisbane Technical College, where he took an apprenticeship as a carpenter. From 1964 to 1975, he was a waterside worker, becoming active in labour politics as a delegate to the Queensland Trades and Labour Council and chairman of the Maritime Unions Group. He was also a federal councillor for the Australian Waterside Workers Federation and president of the Brisbane Waterside Workers Association in 1980.

McLean was elected to the Queensland Legislative Assembly in 1980 as the Labor member for Bulimba. In 1981 he became Opposition Spokesman on Employment and Industrial Affairs, adding Maritime Services, Harbours and Marine Activities for most of 1983. Following Labor's victory at the 1989 election, he became Minister for Administrative Services. He retired in 1992. McLean died from an asbestos-related lung condition in 1999 at the age of 60, and was given a State funeral.

Parliament of Queensland
Preceded by Jack Houston	Member for Bulimba; 1980–1992	Succeeded by Pat Purcell
