= Ken McElligott =

Australian politician (1940–2021)

Member of the Queensland Legislative Assembly for Townsville
- In office 22 October 1983 – 1 November 1986
- Preceded by: Norman Scott-Young
- Succeeded by: Tony Burreket

Member of the Queensland Legislative Assembly for Thuringowa
- In office 1 November 1986 – 13 June 1998
- Preceded by: New seat
- Succeeded by: Ken Turner

Personal details
- Born: Kenneth Victor McElligott; 14 February 1940 Maryborough, Queensland, Australia
- Died: 28 May 2021 (aged 81)
- Party: Labor
- Occupation: Administrative Officer

Kenneth Victor McElligott (14 February 1940 – 28 May 2021) was an Australian politician.

He was born in Maryborough. After working as an administrative officer at James Cook University, he was elected to Townsville City Council in 1976. A member of the Labor Party, he became Deputy Mayor in 1980. He held these positions until 1983, when he was elected to the Queensland Legislative Assembly as the member for Townsville, transferring to the new seat of Thuringowa in 1986. Immediately after his election he was appointed Opposition Spokesman on Welfare Services, Youth and Ethnic Affairs, shifting to Health in 1985, to Regional and Northern Development and Small Business in 1987, and to Local Government and Small Business in 1988. With the election of the Goss government in 1989 he became Minister for Health, serving until 1991. He returned to the front bench in 1995 as the Minister for Lands, serving until the government's defeat on the floor of the Assembly in 1996. McElligott was defeated in 1998 by One Nation candidate Ken Turner.

Parliament of Queensland
Preceded by Norman Scott-Young	Member for Townsville; 1983–1986	Succeeded by Tony Burreket
New seat	Member for Thuringowa; 1986–1998	Succeeded by Ken Turner
