= Electoral district of Nerang =

Nerang Queensland—Legislative Assembly
- State: Queensland
- Created: 1986
- Abolished: 2001
- Namesake: Nerang, Queensland

Nerang was an electoral district of the Legislative Assembly in the Australian state of Queensland from 1986 to 2001.

The district was based in the southern part of the Gold Coast and named for the suburb of Nerang.

== Members for Nerang ==
Member	Party	Term
Tom Hynd	National	1986–1989
Ray Connor	Liberal	1989–2001

== See also ==
- Electoral districts of Queensland
- Members of the Queensland Legislative Assembly by year
- Category:Members of the Queensland Legislative Assembly by name
