= Peter Beard (politician) =

Australian politician

Peter Beard JP

Deputy Leader of the Queensland Liberal Party
- In office 31 January 1988 – 2 December 1989
- Leader: Angus Innes
- Preceded by: Angus Innes
- Succeeded by: Denver Beanland

Member of the Queensland Legislative Assembly for Mount Isa
- In office 1 November 1986 – 2 December 1989
- Preceded by: Bill Price
- Succeeded by: Tony McGrady

Personal details
- Born: Peter Francis Beard; 22 May 1935 (age 91) Mount Isa, Queensland, Australia
- Died: 19/09/2024
- Party: Liberal Party
- Spouse: Gayle Patricia McGarry (m.1959)
- Education: University of Queensland
- Occupation: Teacher

Peter Francis Beard (born 22 May 1935) is a former Australian politician. He was a Member of the Queensland Legislative Assembly.

== Early life ==
Beard was born in Mount Isa to Francis James Beard and Phyllis Mabel, née Fisher. He attended All Souls' School in Charters Towers before studying for a Bachelor of Arts at the University of Queensland. He then worked as a primary and secondary school teacher, and also as a personnel officer at Mount Isa Mines Ltd, where he had worked as a labourer after high school. He was chairman of the Mount Isa Mines Employees Health Society and secretary of the local branch of the Queensland Teachers Union.

== Politics ==
A member of the Liberal Party, Beard was elected to the Queensland Legislative Assembly as the member for Mount Isa in 1986, rising to become deputy leader of the party in 1988, but he lost his seat in 1989.

Parliament of Queensland
Preceded by Bill Price	Member for Mount Isa; 1986–1989	Succeeded by Tony McGrady
