= Electoral district of Mount Isa =

Mount Isa Queensland—Legislative Assembly
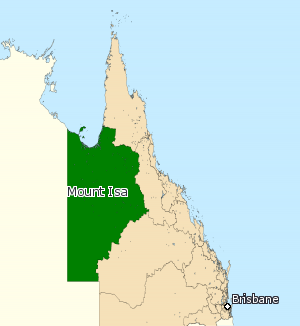
- Mount Isa (2008–2017)
- State: Queensland
- Dates current: 1972–2017
- MP: Several
- Party: Labor (4 times); National (once); Liberal (once); Katter's Australian (once)
- Namesake: Mount Isa
- Electors: 19,119 (2015)
- Area: 570,502 km^{2} (220,272.1 sq mi)
- Coordinates: 21°7′S 141°51′E

Mount Isa was an electoral district in the Legislative Assembly of Queensland in the state of Queensland, Australia from 1972 to 2017. It was located in the outback of the far west of the state and covered an area of 570,502 km^{2} (220,272 sq mi).

== History ==
The district took its name from the mining city of Mount Isa, which held the great majority of the electorate's population. Most of the electorate was virtually unpopulated. Following the implementation of one vote one value reforms in 1989, Mount Isa was one of five remote electorates that were allowed a greater variance from the average seat's population.

The seat was held by the conservative parties for all but two terms in the first two decades of its existence, mostly coinciding with the height of National dominance. Labor took the seat in its 1989 landslide and held it for almost a quarter-century, usually without serious difficulty. It was one of the few areas of regional Queensland where Labor did well.

In 2012, however, Robbie Katter took the seat for Katter's Australian Party on a massive swing, pushing Labor into third place. Katter's father is Bob Katter, the federal member for Kennedy and the founder/leader of the Australian Party. The elder Katter had represented much of what had been Mount Isa for almost three decades; much of the eastern portion had been part of the elder Katter's state seat of Flinders, and Mount Isa was virtually coextensive with the western portion of Kennedy. The younger Katter was re-elected with a similar margin in 2015, despite the Labor Party returning to government.

As of the 2015 state election, it had 19,119 registered electors, a slight decrease from 19,170 in 2009.

The district was abolished in the 2017 redistribution. Most of its northern portion, including Mount Isa, became part of the new seat of Traeger.

== Members for Mount Isa ==
Member	Party	Term
Alec Inch	Labor	1972–1974
Angelo Bertoni	National	1974–1983
Bill Price	Labor	1983–1986
Peter Beard	Liberal	1986–1989
Tony McGrady	Labor	1989–2006
Betty Kiernan	Labor	2006–2012
Robbie Katter	Katter's Australian	2012–2017
