= Results of the 2015 Queensland state election =

Queensland state election, 31 January 2015 Legislative Assembly << 2012–2017 >>
Enrolled voters	2,981,145				
Votes cast	2,679,874		Turnout	89.89	−1.11
Informal votes	56,431		Informal	2.11	−0.05
Summary of votes by party
Party	Primary votes	%	Swing	Seats	Change
Liberal National	1,084,060	41.32	–8.33	42	–34
Labor	983,054	37.47	+10.81	44	+35
Greens	221,157	8.43	+0.90	0	±0
Palmer United	133,929	5.11	+5.11	0	±0
Katter's Australian	50,588	1.93	–9.61	2	±0
Family First	31,231	1.19	–0.17	0	±0
One Nation	24,111	0.92	+0.82	0	±0
Independent	95,313	3.63	+0.47	1	−1
Total	2,623,443			89	
Two-party-preferred
Labor		51.1	+14.0		
Liberal National		48.9	−14.0		
^{* The statewide two-party preferred summary is an estimate calculated by Antony Green.}

This is a list of electoral district results for the Queensland 2015 election.

== Results by electoral district ==
=== Albert ===
2015 Queensland state election: Albert
Party	Candidate	Votes	%	±%
Liberal National	Mark Boothman	13,597	43.13	−6.46
Labor	Melissa McMahon	11,145	35.35	+6.99
Palmer United	Blair Brewster	3,428	10.87	+10.87
Greens	Jane Cajdler	1,923	6.10	+0.70
Family First	Amanda Best	1,434	4.55	−1.24
Total formal votes		31,527	97.21	+0.04
Informal votes		906	2.79	−0.04
Turnout		32,433	88.33	−3.09
Two-party-preferred result
Liberal National	Mark Boothman	14,872	51.67	−10.22
Labor	Melissa McMahon	13,911	48.33	+10.22
Liberal National hold		Swing	−10.22	

=== Algester ===
2015 Queensland state election: Algester
Party	Candidate	Votes	%	±%
Labor	Leeanne Enoch	14,089	49.56	+15.71
Liberal National	Anthony Shorten	11,247	39.56	−11.16
Greens	Susan Wolf	2,056	7.23	+0.28
Independent	Kevin Forshaw	1,037	3.65	+3.65
Total formal votes		28,429	97.67	+0.34
Informal votes		679	2.33	−0.34
Turnout		29,108	90.55	−2.27
Two-party-preferred result
Labor	Leeanne Enoch	15,594	56.99	+16.14
Liberal National	Anthony Shorten	11,770	43.01	−16.14
Labor gain from Liberal National		Swing	+16.14	

=== Ashgrove ===
2015 Queensland state election: Ashgrove
Party	Candidate	Votes	%	±%
Labor	Kate Jones	13,372	44.45	+7.85
Liberal National	Campbell Newman	13,125	43.63	−8.18
Greens	Robert Hogg	3,047	10.13	+0.96
Independent	Connie Cicchini	279	0.93	+0.39
Independent	Peter Jeremijenko	261	0.87	+0.33
Total formal votes		30,084	98.97	−0.25
Informal votes		313	1.03	+0.25
Turnout		30,397	91.34	−1.06
Two-party-preferred result
Labor	Kate Jones	16,009	54.25	+9.95
Liberal National	Campbell Newman	13,498	45.75	−9.95
Labor gain from Liberal National		Swing	+9.95	

=== Aspley ===
2015 Queensland state election: Aspley
Party	Candidate	Votes	%	±%
Liberal National	Tracy Davis	14,868	52.41	−13.02
Labor	Gayle Dallaston	10,835	38.20	+14.65
Greens	Noel Clothier	2,663	9.39	+1.96
Total formal votes		28,366	98.28	−0.12
Informal votes		497	1.72	+0.12
Turnout		28,863	91.95	−2.47
Two-party-preferred result
Liberal National	Tracy Davis	15,276	55.17	−16.58
Labor	Gayle Dallaston	12,412	44.83	+16.58
Liberal National hold		Swing	−16.58	

=== Barron River ===
2015 Queensland state election: Barron River
Party	Candidate	Votes	%	±%
Liberal National	Michael Trout	13,866	41.60	−4.11
Labor	Craig Crawford	13,138	39.41	+11.57
Greens	Noel Castley-Wright	3,392	10.18	+1.02
Palmer United	Andrew Schebella	2,937	8.81	+8.81
Total formal votes		33,333	97.91	+0.16
Informal votes		710	2.09	−0.16
Turnout		34,043	88.49	−0.98
Two-party-preferred result
Labor	Craig Crawford	16,764	53.12	+12.60
Liberal National	Michael Trout	14,794	46.88	−12.60
Labor gain from Liberal National		Swing	+12.60	

=== Beaudesert ===
2015 Queensland state election: Beaudesert
Party	Candidate	Votes	%	±%
Liberal National	Jon Krause	15,086	47.47	+0.36
Labor	Kay Hohenhaus	9,281	29.20	+15.23
Greens	Pietro Agnoletto	2,613	8.22	−0.11
One Nation	Robert Bowyer	2,145	6.75	+4.16
Palmer United	Adele Ishaac	1,989	6.26	+6.26
Family First	Jeremy Fredericks	668	2.10	+0.47
Total formal votes		31,782	97.69	−0.16
Informal votes		753	2.31	+0.16
Turnout		32,535	91.28	−1.29
Two-party-preferred result
Liberal National	Jon Krause	16,440	57.53	−3.03
Labor	Kay Hohenhaus	12,138	42.47	+3.03
Liberal National hold		Swing	−3.03	

=== Brisbane Central ===
2015 Queensland state election: Brisbane Central
Party	Candidate	Votes	%	±%
Liberal National	Robert Cavallucci	12,042	41.81	−6.89
Labor	Grace Grace	10,590	36.77	+3.10
Greens	Kirsten Lovejoy	5,355	18.59	+3.26
Independent	Kai Jones	815	2.83	+0.53
Total formal votes		28,802	98.36	+0.01
Informal votes		481	1.64	−0.01
Turnout		29,283	84.96	−1.93
Two-party-preferred result
Labor	Grace Grace	14,334	53.25	+8.13
Liberal National	Robert Cavallucci	12,584	46.75	−8.13
Labor gain from Liberal National		Swing	+8.13	

=== Broadwater ===
2015 Queensland state election: Broadwater
Party	Candidate	Votes	%	±%
Liberal National	Verity Barton	13,537	47.46	−3.84
Labor	Penny Toland	8,844	31.01	−0.64
Greens	Daniel Kwon	2,145	7.52	+4.31
Palmer United	Gueorgui Sokolov	1,696	5.95	+5.95
One Nation	Phil Pollock	1,061	3.72	+3.72
Family First	Stuart Ballantyne	988	3.46	+1.63
Independent	Amin-Reza Javanmard	252	0.88	+0.88
Total formal votes		28,523	97.44	−0.27
Informal votes		748	2.56	+0.27
Turnout		29,271	86.62	−1.95
Two-party-preferred result
Liberal National	Verity Barton	14,544	57.19	−4.10
Labor	Penny Toland	10,885	42.81	+4.10
Liberal National hold		Swing	−4.10	

=== Buderim ===
2015 Queensland state election: Buderim
Party	Candidate	Votes	%	±%
Liberal National	Steve Dickson	15,297	52.62	−9.55
Labor	Elaine Hughes	6,627	22.80	+6.61
Palmer United	Tess Lazarus	3,781	13.01	+13.01
Greens	Susan Etheridge	3,366	11.58	+0.93
Total formal votes		29,071	97.90	−0.15
Informal votes		625	2.10	+0.15
Turnout		29,696	89.75	−0.01
Two-party-preferred result
Liberal National	Steve Dickson	16,353	62.16	−13.85
Labor	Elaine Hughes	9,954	37.84	+13.85
Liberal National hold		Swing	−13.85	

=== Bulimba ===
2015 Queensland state election: Bulimba
Party	Candidate	Votes	%	±%
Labor	Di Farmer	14,539	47.72	+4.81
Liberal National	Aaron Dillaway	12,755	41.87	−4.83
Greens	David Hale	3,173	10.41	+0.02
Total formal votes		30,467	98.54	+0.27
Informal votes		450	1.46	−0.27
Turnout		30,917	90.18	−0.93
Two-party-preferred result
Labor	Di Farmer	16,741	56.14	+6.28
Liberal National	Aaron Dillaway	13,077	43.86	−6.28
Labor gain from Liberal National		Swing	+6.28	

=== Bundaberg ===
2015 Queensland state election: Bundaberg
Party	Candidate	Votes	%	±%
Liberal National	Jack Dempsey	11,128	41.45	−11.71
Labor	Leanne Donaldson	10,654	39.68	+15.96
Palmer United	Robert Brown	3,208	11.95	+11.95
Greens	Meg Anderson	1,112	4.14	+1.20
Independent	Richard Freudenberg	746	2.78	+2.78
Total formal votes		26,848	97.81	+0.21
Informal votes		602	2.19	−0.21
Turnout		27,450	91.67	+0.29
Two-party-preferred result
Labor	Leanne Donaldson	12,783	51.62	+19.79
Liberal National	Jack Dempsey	11,980	48.38	−19.79
Labor gain from Liberal National		Swing	+19.79	

=== Bundamba ===
2015 Queensland state election: Bundamba
Party	Candidate	Votes	%	±%
Labor	Jo-Ann Miller	20,413	61.20	+22.27
Liberal National	Stephen Fenton	8,204	24.60	−11.05
Greens	Ava Greenwood	2,732	8.19	+3.05
Family First	Luke Harris	2,007	6.02	+2.83
Total formal votes		33,356	97.71	+0.33
Informal votes		782	2.29	−0.33
Turnout		34,138	88.82	−2.26
Two-party-preferred result
Labor	Jo-Ann Miller	22,753	71.43	+19.61
Liberal National	Stephen Fenton	9,101	28.57	−19.61
Labor hold		Swing	+19.61	

=== Burdekin ===
2015 Queensland state election: Burdekin
Party	Candidate	Votes	%	±%
Liberal National	Dale Last	10,510	37.30	−10.69
Labor	Angela Zyla	7,522	26.70	+6.12
Katter's Australian	Steven Isles	3,396	12.05	−14.21
Palmer United	Jacinta Warland	2,330	8.27	+8.27
Independent	BJ Davison	2,306	8.18	+8.18
One Nation	Belinda Johnson	1,305	4.63	+4.63
Greens	Lindy Collins	807	2.86	+0.14
Total formal votes		28,176	98.03	−0.07
Informal votes		567	1.97	+0.07
Turnout		28,743	90.90	−0.07
Two-party-preferred result
Liberal National	Dale Last	12,201	52.88	−9.59
Labor	Angela Zyla	10,872	47.12	+9.59
Liberal National hold		Swing	−9.59	

=== Burleigh ===
2015 Queensland state election: Burleigh
Party	Candidate	Votes	%	±%
Liberal National	Michael Hart	13,784	46.67	−4.51
Labor	Gail Hislop	9,175	31.07	+0.22
Greens	Jane Power	3,108	10.52	+2.08
Palmer United	James Mac Anally	2,299	7.78	+7.78
Family First	Susan Baynes	1,167	3.95	+1.54
Total formal votes		29,533	97.42	−0.61
Informal votes		783	2.58	+0.61
Turnout		30,316	87.00	−1.40
Two-party-preferred result
Liberal National	Michael Hart	14,984	56.16	−4.89
Labor	Gail Hislop	11,696	43.84	+4.89
Liberal National hold		Swing	−4.89	

=== Burnett ===
2015 Queensland state election: Burnett
Party	Candidate	Votes	%	±%
Liberal National	Stephen Bennett	14,434	47.19	+7.18
Labor	Bryan Mustill	9,134	29.86	+13.61
Palmer United	Richard Love	4,445	14.53	+14.53
Greens	Colin Sheppard	1,439	4.70	+0.95
Independent	Peter Wyatt	1,134	3.71	+3.71
Total formal votes		30,586	97.57	−0.34
Informal votes		763	2.43	+0.34
Turnout		31,349	92.19	+0.30
Two-party-preferred result
Liberal National	Stephen Bennett	15,494	56.80	–1.69
Labor	Bryan Mustill	11,782	43.20	+1.69
Liberal National hold		Swing	–1.69	

=== Cairns ===
2015 Queensland state election: Cairns
Party	Candidate	Votes	%	±%
Labor	Rob Pyne	13,770	45.60	+18.12
Liberal National	Gavin King	10,960	36.30	−6.21
Palmer United	Jeanette Sackley	2,902	9.61	+9.61
Greens	Myra Gold	2,010	6.66	−0.45
Independent	Bernice Kelly	553	1.83	+1.83
Total formal votes		30,195	97.61	−0.07
Informal votes		739	2.39	+0.07
Turnout		30,934	85.24	−2.59
Two-party-preferred result
Labor	Rob Pyne	16,563	58.45	+17.32
Liberal National	Gavin King	11,774	41.55	−17.32
Labor gain from Liberal National		Swing	+17.32	

=== Callide ===
2015 Queensland state election: Callide
Party	Candidate	Votes	%	±%
Liberal National	Jeff Seeney	12,815	46.50	−6.83
Palmer United	John Bjelke-Petersen	6,944	25.20	+25.20
Labor	Graeme Martin	5,312	19.28	+4.52
Greens	Erich Schulz	848	3.08	−0.17
Independent	Steve Ensby	718	2.61	+2.61
Independent	Michael Higginson	538	1.95	+1.95
Independent	Duncan Scott	384	1.39	−0.67
Total formal votes		27,559	98.40	−0.07
Informal votes		449	1.60	+0.07
Turnout		28,008	91.98	−0.34
Two-candidate-preferred result
Liberal National	Jeff Seeney	13,444	56.67	−6.84
Palmer United	John Bjelke-Petersen	10,280	43.33	+43.33
Liberal National hold		Swing	−6.84	

=== Caloundra ===
2015 Queensland state election: Caloundra
Party	Candidate	Votes	%	±%
Liberal National	Mark McArdle	13,021	43.84	−20.39
Labor	Jason Hunt	8,595	28.94	+6.50
Palmer United	Phillip Collins	3,071	10.34	+10.34
Greens	Fiona Anderson	3,026	10.19	−3.15
Independent	Barry Jones	1,991	6.70	+6.70
Total formal votes		29,704	97.75	+0.35
Informal votes		684	2.25	−0.35
Turnout		30,388	90.76	−0.71
Two-party-preferred result
Liberal National	Mark McArdle	14,223	53.82	−17.41
Labor	Jason Hunt	12,202	46.18	+17.41
Liberal National hold		Swing	−17.41	

=== Capalaba ===
2015 Queensland state election: Capalaba
Party	Candidate	Votes	%	±%
Labor	Don Brown	14,046	47.94	+9.57
Liberal National	Steve Davies	11,602	39.60	−6.94
Greens	Erin Payne	3,649	12.46	+4.89
Total formal votes		29,297	97.40	−0.09
Informal votes		782	2.60	+0.09
Turnout		30,079	91.80	−1.17
Two-party-preferred result
Labor	Don Brown	16,160	57.06	+10.79
Liberal National	Steve Davies	12,163	42.94	−10.79
Labor gain from Liberal National		Swing	+10.79	

=== Chatsworth ===
2015 Queensland state election: Chatsworth
Party	Candidate	Votes	%	±%
Liberal National	Steve Minnikin	15,216	48.93	−7.11
Labor	Paul Keene	12,255	39.41	+9.95
Greens	Jarred Reilly	2,677	8.61	+2.39
Family First	Aaron Deecke	947	3.05	+1.06
Total formal votes		31,095	98.33	+0.19
Informal votes		528	1.67	−0.19
Turnout		31,623	91.26	−1.09
Two-party-preferred result
Liberal National	Steve Minnikin	15,864	52.62	−11.52
Labor	Paul Keene	14,285	47.38	+11.52
Liberal National hold		Swing	−11.52	

=== Clayfield ===
2015 Queensland state election: Clayfield
Party	Candidate	Votes	%	±%
Liberal National	Tim Nicholls	16,113	52.89	−9.44
Labor	John Martin	9,769	32.07	+10.47
Greens	Anthony Pink	3,393	11.14	+0.30
Independent	Katrina MacDonald	1,188	3.90	+3.90
Total formal votes		30,463	98.39	+0.02
Informal votes		498	1.61	−0.02
Turnout		30,961	89.38	−1.93
Two-party-preferred result
Liberal National	Tim Nicholls	16,735	57.21	−13.35
Labor	John Martin	12,515	42.79	+13.35
Liberal National hold		Swing	−13.35	

=== Cleveland ===
2015 Queensland state election: Cleveland
Party	Candidate	Votes	%	±%
Liberal National	Mark Robinson	16,434	52.14	−9.75
Labor	Tracey Huges	11,288	35.82	+9.37
Greens	Amanda White	3,795	12.04	+4.47
Total formal votes		31,517	98.15	+0.13
Informal votes		593	1.85	−0.13
Turnout		32,110	91.88	−1.13
Two-party-preferred result
Liberal National	Mark Robinson	16,929	55.45	−12.65
Labor	Tracey Huges	13,599	44.55	+12.65
Liberal National hold		Swing	−12.65	

=== Condamine ===
2015 Queensland state election: Condamine
Party	Candidate	Votes	%	±%
Liberal National	Pat Weir	17,028	51.18	−7.12
Labor	Brendon Huybregts	7,271	21.86	+7.70
Katter's Australian	Ben Hopper	5,059	15.21	−6.11
Family First	Alexandra Todd	1,455	4.37	+4.37
Greens	Pamela Fay Weekes	1,306	3.93	−0.11
Independent	Shane White	1,150	3.46	+1.27
Total formal votes		33,269	97.91	−0.11
Informal votes		710	2.09	+0.11
Turnout		33,979	92.67	−1.52
Two-party-preferred result
Liberal National	Pat Weir	18,837	66.28	−3.82
Labor	Brendon Huybregts	9,584	33.72	+3.82
Liberal National hold		Swing	−3.82	

=== Cook ===
2015 Queensland state election: Cook
Party	Candidate	Votes	%	±%
Labor	Billy Gordon	10,119	40.41	+7.99
Liberal National	David Kempton	8,424	33.64	−3.87
Katter's Australian	Lee Marriott	3,134	12.52	−9.83
Palmer United	Jason Booth	1,678	6.70	+6.70
Greens	Daryl Desjardin	1,353	5.40	−0.10
Independent	Michaelangelo Newie	332	1.33	+1.33
Total formal votes		25,040	98.05	−0.44
Informal votes		497	1.95	+0.44
Turnout		25,537	86.24	−0.03
Two-party-preferred result
Labor	Billy Gordon	12,527	56.77	+10.20
Liberal National	David Kempton	9,540	43.23	−10.20
Labor gain from Liberal National		Swing	+10.20	

=== Coomera ===
2015 Queensland state election: Coomera
Party	Candidate	Votes	%	±%
Liberal National	Michael Crandon	16,916	50.53	−11.36
Labor	Brett McCreadie	10,377	31.00	+11.10
Palmer United	Shirley Morgan	3,115	9.30	+9.30
Greens	Chris Wisbey	1,834	5.48	−0.56
Family First	Cathy O'Brien	1,236	3.69	+3.69
Total formal votes		33,478	97.41	+0.11
Informal votes		889	2.59	−0.11
Turnout		34,367	87.87	−2.76
Two-party-preferred result
Liberal National	Michael Crandon	18,018	58.53	−14.73
Labor	Brett McCreadie	12,766	41.47	+14.73
Liberal National hold		Swing	−14.73	

=== Currumbin ===
2015 Queensland state election: Currumbin
Party	Candidate	Votes	%	±%
Liberal National	Jann Stuckey	13,389	45.39	−13.45
Labor	Ashley Wain	8,804	29.84	+7.92
Greens	David Wyatt	3,442	11.67	+2.16
Palmer United	Kristian Rees	2,046	6.94	+6.94
One Nation	Deborah Gravenall	1,073	3.64	+3.64
Family First	Ben Donovan	746	2.53	−0.04
Total formal votes		29,500	97.59	−0.02
Informal votes		727	2.41	+0.02
Turnout		30,227	87.49	−1.43
Two-party-preferred result
Liberal National	Jann Stuckey	14,475	55.23	−14.96
Labor	Ashley Wain	11,734	44.77	+14.96
Liberal National hold		Swing	−14.96	

=== Dalrymple ===
2015 Queensland state election: Dalrymple
Party	Candidate	Votes	%	±%
Katter's Australian	Shane Knuth	11,127	41.59	−12.13
Liberal National	Liz Schmidt	8,004	29.92	+0.81
Labor	Leanne Kettleton	6,489	24.26	+13.17
Greens	Valerie Weier	1,131	4.23	−0.50
Total formal votes		26,751	98.31	−0.22
Informal votes		459	1.69	+0.22
Turnout		27,210	90.11	−0.36
Two-candidate-preferred result
Katter's Australian	Shane Knuth	15,987	65.10	−0.12
Liberal National	Liz Schmidt	8,571	34.90	+0.12
Katter's Australian hold		Swing	−0.12	

=== Everton ===
2015 Queensland state election: Everton
Party	Candidate	Votes	%	±%
Liberal National	Tim Mander	14,601	49.34	−8.16
Labor	Jeff Frew	11,910	40.24	+9.14
Greens	Aidan Norrie	3,084	10.42	+3.21
Total formal votes		29,595	98.31	−0.16
Informal votes		508	1.69	+0.16
Turnout		30,103	92.38	−1.27
Two-party-preferred result
Liberal National	Tim Mander	14,965	51.77	−11.38
Labor	Jeff Frew	13,944	48.23	+11.38
Liberal National hold		Swing	−11.38	

=== Ferny Grove ===
2015 Queensland state election: Ferny Grove
Party	Candidate	Votes	%	±%
Liberal National	Dale Shuttleworth	13,214	44.59	−9.77
Labor	Mark Furner	11,253	37.97	+6.57
Greens	Michael Berkman	3,589	12.11	−2.14
Palmer United	Mark Taverner	993	3.35	+3.35
Arts	Di Gittins	588	1.98	+1.98
Total formal votes		29,637	98.47	+0.21
Informal votes		459	1.53	−0.21
Turnout		30,096	92.66	−1.39
Two-party-preferred result
Labor	Mark Furner	14,445	50.82	+10.34
Liberal National	Dale Shuttleworth	13,979	49.18	−10.34
Labor gain from Liberal National		Swing	+10.34	

=== Gaven ===
2015 Queensland state election: Gaven
Party	Candidate	Votes	%	±%
Liberal National	Sid Cramp	11,786	38.95	−16.21
Labor	Michael Riordan	8,700	28.75	+5.89
Independent	Alex Douglas	3,779	12.49	+12.49
Palmer United	Adam Marcinkowski	2,740	9.05	+9.05
Greens	Toni McPherson	1,852	6.12	+0.54
Family First	Ben O'Brien	1,083	3.58	−1.14
Independent	Chris Ivory	321	1.06	+1.06
Total formal votes		30,261	96.86	−0.14
Informal votes		980	3.14	+0.14
Turnout		31,241	88.39	−1.15
Two-party-preferred result
Liberal National	Sid Cramp	13,362	52.24	−16.86
Labor	Michael Riordan	12,214	47.76	+16.86
Liberal National hold		Swing	−16.86	

=== Gladstone ===
2015 Queensland state election: Gladstone
Party	Candidate	Votes	%	±%
Labor	Glenn Butcher	16,512	52.42	+23.23
Independent	Craig Butler	8,981	28.51	−20.45
Liberal National	Michael Duggan	4,784	15.19	+4.33
Greens	Craig Tomsett	1,221	3.88	+1.77
Total formal votes		31,498	98.18	−0.18
Informal votes		583	1.82	+0.18
Turnout		32,081	90.67	−0.24
Two-candidate-preferred result
Labor	Glenn Butcher	17,152	61.89	+25.92
Independent	Craig Butler	10,561	38.11	+38.11
Labor gain from Independent		Swing	+25.92	

=== Glass House ===
2015 Queensland state election: Glass House
Party	Candidate	Votes	%	±%
Liberal National	Andrew Powell	13,727	43.72	−12.13
Labor	Brent Hampstead	9,587	30.54	+12.87
Greens	David Knobel	4,511	14.37	−1.27
Palmer United	Scott Higgins	3,570	11.37	+11.37
Total formal votes		31,395	97.82	+0.18
Informal votes		700	2.18	−0.18
Turnout		32,095	90.60	−2.02
Two-party-preferred result
Liberal National	Andrew Powell	14,890	51.41	−18.98
Labor	Brent Hampstead	14,074	48.59	+18.98
Liberal National hold		Swing	−18.98	

=== Greenslopes ===
2015 Queensland state election: Greenslopes
Party	Candidate	Votes	%	±%
Labor	Joseph Kelly	12,077	42.42	+3.21
Liberal National	Ian Kaye	12,013	42.20	−5.67
Greens	Darren Ellis	3,682	12.93	+0.02
Family First	Matthew Darragh	696	2.44	+2.44
Total formal votes		28,468	98.42	+0.04
Informal votes		456	1.58	−0.04
Turnout		28,924	90.75	−1.25
Two-party-preferred result
Labor	Joseph Kelly	14,947	54.25	+6.70
Liberal National	Ian Kaye	12,607	45.75	−6.70
Labor gain from Liberal National		Swing	+6.70	

=== Gregory ===
2015 Queensland state election: Gregory
Party	Candidate	Votes	%	±%
Liberal National	Lachlan Millar	10,987	46.38	−12.72
Labor	Cheryl Thompson	6,249	26.38	+8.87
Katter's Australian	Ross Stockham	2,388	10.08	−6.92
Palmer United	Michael Linton-Helliar	2,236	9.44	+9.44
Independent	Bruce Currie	1,370	5.78	+2.12
Greens	Norm Weston	457	1.93	−0.79
Total formal votes		23,687	98.21	−0.21
Informal votes		432	1.79	+0.21
Turnout		24,119	90.92	+1.06
Two-party-preferred result
Liberal National	Lachlan Millar	12,342	61.07	−14.40
Labor	Cheryl Thompson	7,866	38.93	+14.40
Liberal National hold		Swing	−14.40	

=== Gympie ===
2015 Queensland state election: Gympie
Party	Candidate	Votes	%	±%
Liberal National	Tony Perrett	12,366	41.30	−11.72
Labor	Stephen Meredith	6,971	23.28	+11.04
Katter's Australian	Shane Paulger	4,804	16.05	−5.79
Palmer United	Mitchell Frost	3,384	11.30	+11.30
Greens	Shena Macdonald	2,414	8.06	−0.43
Total formal votes		29,939	97.80	−0.04
Informal votes		673	2.20	+0.04
Turnout		30,612	91.52	−1.01
Two-party-preferred result
Liberal National	Tony Perrett	13,833	57.10	−10.16
Labor	Stephen Meredith	10,394	42.90	+10.16
Liberal National hold		Swing	−10.16	

=== Hervey Bay ===
2015 Queensland state election: Hervey Bay
Party	Candidate	Votes	%	±%
Liberal National	Ted Sorensen	15,316	47.96	−11.27
Labor	Tony Gubbins	10,088	31.59	+10.39
Palmer United	Lynette Pearsall	3,469	10.86	+10.86
Independent	Jannean Dean	1,216	3.81	+3.81
Greens	Kristen Lyons	1,177	3.69	+0.24
Family First	Axel Beard	669	2.09	−1.67
Total formal votes		31,935	97.65	−0.18
Informal votes		768	2.35	+0.18
Turnout		32,703	90.13	−0.92
Two-party-preferred result
Liberal National	Ted Sorensen	16,334	56.62	−15.10
Labor	Tony Gubbins	12,517	43.38	+15.11
Liberal National hold		Swing	−15.10	

=== Hinchinbrook ===
2015 Queensland state election: Hinchinbrook
Party	Candidate	Votes	%	±%
Liberal National	Andrew Cripps	12,156	40.67	−3.37
Labor	Jesse Trecco-Alexander	7,155	23.94	+7.39
Katter's Australian	Barry Barnes	5,224	17.48	−17.77
Palmer United	Martin Brewster	3,029	10.13	+10.13
One Nation	William Hankin	1,224	4.10	+4.10
Greens	Jenny Stirling	1,101	3.68	+0.49
Total formal votes		29,889	98.29	−0.22
Informal votes		520	1.71	+0.22
Turnout		30,409	90.61	−1.57
Two-party-preferred result
Liberal National	Andrew Cripps	15,494	58.92	+5.29
Labor	Jesse Trecco-Alexander	10,804	41.08	+41.08
Liberal National hold		Swing	+5.29	

=== Inala ===
2015 Queensland state election: Inala
Party	Candidate	Votes	%	±%
Labor	Annastacia Palaszczuk	18,915	68.46	+22.24
Liberal National	Adam Hannant	6,442	23.32	−11.74
Greens	Silke Volkmann	2,272	8.22	+1.01
Total formal votes		27,629	97.76	+0.76
Informal votes		632	2.24	−0.76
Turnout		28,261	89.67	−1.29
Two-party-preferred result
Labor	Annastacia Palaszczuk	20,271	75.12	+18.22
Liberal National	Adam Hannant	6,715	24.88	−18.22
Labor hold		Swing	+18.22	

=== Indooroopilly ===
2015 Queensland state election: Indooroopilly
Party	Candidate	Votes	%	±%
Liberal National	Scott Emerson	13,502	50.98	−9.91
Labor	Christopher Horacek	7,260	27.41	+8.74
Greens	Jake Schoermer	4,933	18.63	+0.14
Independent	Anita Diamond	490	1.85	+1.85
Independent	Paul Swan	165	0.62	+0.62
Independent	Ben Freney	134	0.51	+0.51
Total formal votes		26,484	98.64	+0.03
Informal votes		364	1.36	−0.03
Turnout		26,848	88.62	−1.26
Two-party-preferred result
Liberal National	Scott Emerson	14,111	56.73	−12.82
Labor	Christopher Horacek	10,763	43.27	+12.82
Liberal National hold		Swing	−12.82	

=== Ipswich ===
2015 Queensland state election: Ipswich
Party	Candidate	Votes	%	±%
Labor	Jennifer Howard	15,904	53.23	+22.08
Liberal National	Ian Berry	8,526	28.53	−7.33
Greens	Pat Walsh	2,245	7.51	+1.90
Independent	Patricia Petersen	1,767	5.91	−2.93
Family First	Tim Stieler	1,438	4.81	+1.66
Total formal votes		29,880	97.94	+0.61
Informal votes		629	2.06	−0.61
Turnout		30,509	91.42	−0.59
Two-party-preferred result
Labor	Jennifer Howard	18,517	65.90	+20.09
Liberal National	Ian Berry	9,581	34.10	−20.09
Labor gain from Liberal National		Swing	+20.09	

=== Ipswich West ===
2015 Queensland state election: Ipswich West
Party	Candidate	Votes	%	±%
Labor	Jim Madden	14,025	45.66	+13.83
Liberal National	Sean Choat	10,911	35.52	−8.02
One Nation	Christopher Reynolds	3,076	10.01	+10.01
Greens	Ian Simons	1,782	5.80	−0.52
Independent	Leo Talty	925	3.01	+3.01
Total formal votes		30,719	97.98	+0.23
Informal votes		632	2.02	−0.23
Turnout		31,351	91.09	−2.15
Two-party-preferred result
Labor	Jim Madden	16,376	57.71	+14.87
Liberal National	Sean Choat	11,998	42.29	−14.87
Labor gain from Liberal National		Swing	+14.87	

=== Kallangur ===
2015 Queensland state election: Kallangur
Party	Candidate	Votes	%	±%
Labor	Shane King	14,285	48.12	+19.27
Liberal National	Trevor Ruthenberg	12,235	41.21	−10.84
Greens	Jason Kennedy	3,166	10.67	+2.75
Total formal votes		29,686	97.49	−0.03
Informal votes		763	2.51	+0.03
Turnout		30,449	91.18	−1.06
Two-party-preferred result
Labor	Shane King	16,196	56.13	+18.56
Liberal National	Trevor Ruthenberg	12,657	43.87	−18.56
Labor gain from Liberal National		Swing	+18.56	

=== Kawana ===
2015 Queensland state election: Kawana
Party	Candidate	Votes	%	±%
Liberal National	Jarrod Bleijie	15,909	50.39	−16.45
Labor	Mark Moss	8,422	26.68	+8.81
Palmer United	Jeremy Davey	3,693	11.70	+11.70
Greens	Marcus Finch	2,743	8.69	+0.36
Independent	Michael Jessop	516	1.63	+1.63
Independent	Jason Deller	287	0.91	+0.91
Total formal votes		31,570	97.71	−0.11
Informal votes		740	2.29	+0.11
Turnout		32,310	89.76	−0.87
Two-party-preferred result
Liberal National	Jarrod Bleijie	16,991	60.09	−16.17
Labor	Mark Moss	11,285	39.91	+16.17
Liberal National hold		Swing	−16.17	

=== Keppel ===
2015 Queensland state election: Keppel
Party	Candidate	Votes	%	±%
Labor	Brittany Lauga	14,403	44.43	+10.98
Liberal National	Bruce Young	12,698	39.17	−5.08
Palmer United	Warren Purnell	2,679	8.26	+8.26
Greens	Brandon Jones	1,497	4.62	−1.80
Independent	Bruce Diamond	1,143	3.53	+3.53
Total formal votes		32,420	98.32	+0.37
Informal votes		554	1.68	−0.37
Turnout		32,974	92.56	−0.14
Two-party-preferred result
Labor	Brittany Lauga	16,465	54.80	+11.19
Liberal National	Bruce Young	13,583	45.20	−11.19
Labor gain from Liberal National		Swing	+11.19	

=== Lockyer ===
2015 Queensland state election: Lockyer
Party	Candidate	Votes	%	±%
Liberal National	Ian Rickuss	10,259	33.73	−18.28
One Nation	Pauline Hanson	8,132	26.74	+26.74
Labor	Steve Leese	7,652	25.16	+7.48
Katter's Australian	David Neuendorf	2,111	6.94	−16.88
Greens	Clare Rudkin	1,190	3.91	−2.58
Palmer United	Craig Gunnis	1,068	3.51	+3.51
Total formal votes		30,412	98.46	+0.80
Informal votes		476	1.54	−0.80
Turnout		30,888	92.14	−1.52
Two-candidate-preferred result
Liberal National	Ian Rickuss	13,230	50.22	−14.65
One Nation	Pauline Hanson	13,116	49.78	+14.65
Liberal National hold		Swing	−14.65	

=== Logan ===
2015 Queensland state election: Logan
Party	Candidate	Votes	%	±%
Labor	Linus Power	13,839	51.69	+18.40
Liberal National	Michael Pucci	9,267	34.61	−6.40
Greens	Kim Southwood	1,654	6.18	+0.80
Family First	David Pellowe	1,098	4.10	+4.10
Independent	Daniel Murphy	523	1.95	+1.95
Independent	Peter Ervik	393	1.47	+1.47
Total formal votes		26,774	96.89	+0.26
Informal votes		859	3.11	−0.26
Turnout		27,633	89.94	−1.34
Two-party-preferred result
Labor	Linus Power	15,346	60.82	+15.62
Liberal National	Michael Pucci	9,884	39.18	−15.62
Labor gain from Liberal National		Swing	+15.62	

=== Lytton ===
2015 Queensland state election: Lytton
Party	Candidate	Votes	%	±%
Labor	Joan Pease	14,368	49.00	+9.71
Liberal National	Neil Symes	10,657	36.35	−7.32
Greens	Dave Nelson	2,616	8.92	+0.84
Independent	Tamera Michel	849	2.90	+2.90
Independent	Jamie Evans	831	2.83	+2.83
Total formal votes		29,321	98.11	+0.63
Informal votes		564	1.89	−0.63
Turnout		29,885	91.30	−0.89
Two-party-preferred result
Labor	Joan Pease	16,754	59.80	+11.38
Liberal National	Neil Symes	11,265	40.20	−11.38
Labor gain from Liberal National		Swing	+11.38	

=== Mackay ===
2015 Queensland state election: Mackay
Party	Candidate	Votes	%	±%
Labor	Julieanne Gilbert	11,346	43.83	+5.25
Liberal National	Deon Attard	6,680	25.80	−11.14
Independent	Julie Boyd	5,720	22.10	+22.10
Greens	Jonathon Dykyj	1,285	4.96	−0.58
Family First	Lindsay Temple	857	3.31	+3.31
Total formal votes		25,888	97.54	−0.26
Informal votes		653	2.46	+0.26
Turnout		26,541	89.44	−0.31
Two-party-preferred result
Labor	Julieanne Gilbert	13,542	62.39	+11.86
Liberal National	Deon Attard	8,162	37.61	−11.86
Labor hold		Swing	+11.86	

=== Mansfield ===
2015 Queensland state election: Mansfield
Party	Candidate	Votes	%	±%
Liberal National	Ian Walker	12,574	46.88	−6.79
Labor	Adam Obeid	10,875	40.55	+8.18
Greens	Nick Jelicic	2,476	9.23	+3.11
Independent	Jarrod Wirth	895	3.34	+2.54
Total formal votes		26,820	98.31	+0.03
Informal votes		460	1.69	−0.03
Turnout		27,280	90.59	−1.35
Two-party-preferred result
Liberal National	Ian Walker	13,113	50.55	−10.59
Labor	Adam Obeid	12,829	49.45	+10.59
Liberal National hold		Swing	−10.59	

=== Maroochydore ===
2015 Queensland state election: Maroochydore
Party	Candidate	Votes	%	±%
Liberal National	Fiona Simpson	15,267	48.46	−9.70
Labor	Bill Gissane	7,743	24.58	+4.43
Palmer United	James McDonald	4,356	13.83	+13.83
Greens	Trudy Byrnes	4,138	13.13	+0.13
Total formal votes		31,504	97.93	+0.10
Informal votes		666	2.07	−0.10
Turnout		32,170	87.78	−0.44
Two-party-preferred result
Liberal National	Fiona Simpson	16,767	59.27	−11.66
Labor	Bill Gissane	11,523	40.73	+11.66
Liberal National hold		Swing	−11.66	

=== Maryborough ===
2015 Queensland state election: Maryborough
Party	Candidate	Votes	%	±%
Liberal National	Anne Maddern	9,702	30.56	−5.19
Labor	Bruce Saunders	8,031	25.29	+13.52
Independent	Chris Foley	6,749	21.26	−8.92
Palmer United	Stephen Anderson	3,931	12.38	+12.38
One Nation	Damian Huxham	2,217	6.98	+6.98
Greens	Katherine Webb	813	2.56	−0.20
Independent	Russell Wattie	309	0.97	−29.20
Total formal votes		31,752	98.05	+0.09
Informal votes		630	1.95	−0.09
Turnout		32,382	92.02	−0.51
Two-party-preferred result
Labor	Bruce Saunders	12,723	51.65	+1.96
Liberal National	Anne Maddern	11,910	48.35	−1.96
Labor gain from Liberal National		Swing	+1.96	

=== Mermaid Beach ===
2015 Queensland state election: Mermaid Beach
Party	Candidate	Votes	%	±%
Liberal National	Ray Stevens	15,287	52.35	−12.78
Labor	Gary Pead	7,333	25.11	+6.64
Greens	Helen Wainwright	2,577	8.83	+1.37
Palmer United	Alex Caraco	2,286	7.83	+7.83
Family First	Simon Green	1,718	5.88	+3.01
Total formal votes		29,201	97.17	−0.51
Informal votes		852	2.84	+0.51
Turnout		30,053	85.62	−2.36
Two-party-preferred result
Liberal National	Ray Stevens	16,374	62.93	−13.12
Labor	Gary Pead	9,647	37.07	+13.12
Liberal National hold		Swing	−13.12	

=== Mirani ===
2015 Queensland state election: Mirani
Party	Candidate	Votes	%	±%
Labor	Jimmy Pearce	12,919	41.89	+13.19
Liberal National	John Kerslake	11,505	37.31	−9.34
Palmer United	Michael Hall	5,146	16.69	+16.69
Greens	Trisha Brindley	1,268	4.11	+0.77
Total formal votes		30,838	97.99	−0.26
Informal votes		633	2.01	+0.26
Turnout		31,471	92.28	−0.10
Two-party-preferred result
Labor	Jimmy Pearce	15,206	54.82	+16.01
Liberal National	John Kerslake	12,534	45.18	−16.01
Labor gain from Liberal National		Swing	+16.01	

=== Moggill ===
2015 Queensland state election: Moggill
Party	Candidate	Votes	%	±%
Liberal National	Christian Rowan	15,104	50.16	−13.11
Labor	Louisa Pink	7,600	25.24	+9.58
Greens	Charles Worringham	4,758	15.80	+2.00
Independent	Barry Anthony Searle	1,959	6.51	+6.51
Palmer United	Dion Van Zyl	692	2.30	+2.30
Total formal votes		30,113	98.51	−0.01
Informal votes		455	1.49	+0.01
Turnout		30,568	91.93	−0.91
Two-party-preferred result
Liberal National	Christian Rowan	16,403	58.21	−15.70
Labor	Louisa Pink	11,778	41.79	+15.70
Liberal National hold		Swing	−15.70	

=== Morayfield ===
2015 Queensland state election: Morayfield
Party	Candidate	Votes	%	±%
Labor	Mark Ryan	14,952	50.65	+13.90
Liberal National	Darren Grimwade	9,708	32.88	−14.14
Palmer United	William Rogan	1,918	6.50	+6.50
Greens	Paul Costin	1,309	4.43	−1.20
Family First	Jon Eaton	890	3.01	+3.01
Independent	Stephen Beck	572	1.94	+1.94
Independent	Andrew Charles Tyrrell	174	0.59	+0.59
Total formal votes		29,523	97.52	+0.15
Informal votes		750	2.48	−0.15
Turnout		30,273	90.80	−1.37
Two-party-preferred result
Labor	Mark Ryan	17,073	61.91	+17.48
Liberal National	Darren Grimwade	10,502	38.09	−17.48
Labor gain from Liberal National		Swing	+17.48	

=== Mount Coot-tha ===
2015 Queensland state election: Mount Coot-tha
Party	Candidate	Votes	%	±%
Liberal National	Saxon Rice	11,814	42.98	−4.76
Labor	Steven Miles	8,966	32.62	+3.98
Greens	Omar Ameer	6,095	22.17	+1.46
Independent	Charles McAlister	611	2.22	+2.22
Total formal votes		27,486	98.75	−0.02
Informal votes		349	1.25	+0.02
Turnout		27,835	87.64	−1.89
Two-party-preferred result
Labor	Steven Miles	13,920	52.59	+7.95
Liberal National	Saxon Rice	12,550	47.41	−7.95
Labor gain from Liberal National		Swing	+7.95	

=== Mount Isa ===
2015 Queensland state election: Mount Isa
Party	Candidate	Votes	%	±%
Katter's Australian	Rob Katter	7,468	46.77	+5.16
Liberal National	John Wharton	4,646	29.09	−0.47
Labor	Simon Tayler	2,899	18.15	−8.49
One Nation	Scott Sheard	638	4.00	+4.00
Greens	Marcus Foth	318	1.99	−0.18
Total formal votes		15,969	98.37	+0.01
Informal votes		264	1.63	−0.01
Turnout		16,233	83.59	−1.83
Two-candidate-preferred result
Katter's Australian	Rob Katter	9,304	65.19	+5.15
Liberal National	John Wharton	4,968	34.81	−5.15
Katter's Australian hold		Swing	+5.15	

=== Mount Ommaney ===
2015 Queensland state election: Mount Ommaney
Party	Candidate	Votes	%	±%
Liberal National	Tarnya Smith	13,264	46.25	−11.05
Labor	Jess Pugh	11,152	38.89	+13.16
Greens	Jenny Mulkearns	3,161	11.02	+1.24
Palmer United	Kathleen Hewlett	1,102	3.84	+3.84
Total formal votes		28,679	98.16	+0.19
Informal votes		537	1.84	−0.19
Turnout		29,216	92.22	−0.66
Two-party-preferred result
Liberal National	Tarnya Smith	13,902	50.23	−16.25
Labor	Jess Pugh	13,776	49.77	+16.25
Liberal National hold		Swing	−16.25	

=== Mudgeeraba ===
2015 Queensland state election: Mudgeeraba
Party	Candidate	Votes	%	±%
Liberal National	Ros Bates	14,846	50.58	−11.11
Labor	Georgi Leader	8,117	27.66	+9.92
Greens	Roger Brisbane	2,279	7.76	+0.09
Palmer United	Benedict Figueroa	2,244	7.65	+7.65
Family First	Chris Petersen	1,339	4.56	−0.67
Independent	Bill Sherwood	525	1.79	+1.79
Total formal votes		29,350	97.29	−0.43
Informal votes		819	2.71	+0.43
Turnout		30,169	88.43	−1.18
Two-party-preferred result
Liberal National	Ros Bates	16,151	60.97	−14.96
Labor	Georgi Leader	10,337	39.03	+14.96
Liberal National hold		Swing	−14.96	

=== Mulgrave ===
2015 Queensland state election: Mulgrave
Party	Candidate	Votes	%	±%
Labor	Curtis Pitt	13,605	51.05	+16.55
Liberal National	Robyn Quick	8,334	31.27	−0.73
Palmer United	Christian Wolff	2,821	10.59	+10.59
Greens	Henry Boer	1,021	3.83	+0.28
Independent	Damian Byrnes	867	3.25	+3.25
Total formal votes		26,648	97.73	−0.40
Informal votes		618	2.27	+0.40
Turnout		27,266	88.66	−1.71
Two-party-preferred result
Labor	Curtis Pitt	15,516	62.76	+11.62
Liberal National	Robyn Quick	9,205	37.24	−11.62
Labor hold		Swing	+11.62	

=== Mundingburra ===
2015 Queensland state election: Mundingburra
Party	Candidate	Votes	%	±%
Liberal National	David Crisafulli	10,921	41.32	−2.02
Labor	Coralee O'Rourke	10,596	40.09	+14.37
Palmer United	Clive Mensink	2,874	10.87	+10.87
Greens	Jenny Brown	2,040	7.72	+2.69
Total formal votes		26,431	97.76	+0.11
Informal votes		606	2.24	−0.11
Turnout		27,037	89.60	−0.29
Two-party-preferred result
Labor	Coralee O'Rourke	13,104	52.76	+12.95
Liberal National	David Crisafulli	11,733	47.24	−12.95
Labor gain from Liberal National		Swing	+12.95	

=== Murrumba ===
2015 Queensland state election: Murrumba
Party	Candidate	Votes	%	±%
Labor	Chris Whiting	16,997	49.45	+17.03
Liberal National	Reg Gulley	13,194	38.38	−10.73
Greens	Simone Dejun	2,131	6.20	+1.32
Family First	Ray Hutchinson	2,051	5.97	+0.29
Total formal votes		34,373	97.82	+0.11
Informal votes		767	2.18	−0.11
Turnout		35,140	89.80	−2.09
Two-party-preferred result
Labor	Chris Whiting	18,934	57.35	+16.87
Liberal National	Reg Gulley	14,079	42.65	−16.87
Labor gain from Liberal National		Swing	+16.87	

=== Nanango ===
2015 Queensland state election: Nanango
Party	Candidate	Votes	%	±%
Liberal National	Deb Frecklington	14,698	47.11	+1.67
Labor	Liz Hollens-Riley	6,397	20.50	+9.95
Katter's Australian	Ray Hopper	4,827	15.47	−10.86
Palmer United	Jason Ford	3,269	10.48	+10.48
Greens	Grant Newson	1,170	3.75	+0.08
Independent	Dean Love	841	2.70	+2.70
Total formal votes		31,202	98.09	−0.01
Informal votes		606	1.91	+0.01
Turnout		31,808	91.89	−0.59
Two-party-preferred result
Liberal National	Deb Frecklington	16,491	63.16	+4.19
Labor	Liz Hollens-Riley	9,617	36.84	+36.84
Liberal National hold		Swing	+4.19	

=== Nicklin ===
2015 Queensland state election: Nicklin
Party	Candidate	Votes	%	±%
Independent	Peter Wellington	13,237	43.79	+4.65
Liberal National	Matt Trace	9,379	31.03	−4.84
Labor	Justin Raethel	4,941	16.34	+8.48
Greens	Julie Doolan	2,673	8.84	+1.77
Total formal votes		30,230	97.78	−0.49
Informal votes		686	2.22	+0.49
Turnout		30,916	90.59	−0.26
Notional two-party-preferred count
Liberal National	Matt Trace		54.7	
Labor	Justin Raethel		45.3	
Two-candidate-preferred result
Independent	Peter Wellington	18,058	64.89	+10.01
Liberal National	Matt Trace	9,770	35.11	−10.01
Independent hold		Swing	+10.01	

=== Noosa ===
2015 Queensland state election: Noosa
Party	Candidate	Votes	%	±%
Liberal National	Glen Elmes	15,455	48.64	−11.95
Greens	Joe Shlegeris	6,789	21.37	+5.86
Labor	Mark Denham	6,506	20.48	+8.04
Palmer United	Ian Woods	3,023	9.51	+9.51
Total formal votes		31,773	97.90	−0.09
Informal votes		681	2.10	+0.09
Turnout		32,454	90.47	+0.97
Two-candidate-preferred result
Liberal National	Glen Elmes	16,513	58.62	−16.84
Greens	Joe Shlegeris	11,657	41.38	+16.84
Liberal National hold		Swing	−16.84	

=== Nudgee ===
2015 Queensland state election: Nudgee
Party	Candidate	Votes	%	±%
Labor	Leanne Linard	15,470	49.69	+12.20
Liberal National	Jason Woodforth	10,531	33.82	−10.67
Greens	Claire Ogden	2,979	9.57	+1.48
Palmer United	Peter Dufficy	1,361	4.37	+4.37
Independent	Edward Monaei	793	2.55	+2.55
Total formal votes		31,134	98.24	+0.43
Informal votes		559	1.76	−0.43
Turnout		31,693	90.30	−1.80
Two-party-preferred result
Labor	Leanne Linard	18,046	61.25	+14.36
Liberal National	Jason Woodforth	11,418	38.75	−14.36
Labor gain from Liberal National		Swing	+14.36	

=== Pine Rivers ===
2015 Queensland state election: Pine Rivers
Party	Candidate	Votes	%	±%
Labor	Nikki Boyd	14,752	48.47	+21.06
Liberal National	Seath Holswich	11,820	38.84	−14.10
Greens	John Marshall	2,444	8.03	−0.41
Independent	Thor Prohaska	1,419	4.66	+4.66
Total formal votes		30,435	97.91	+0.52
Informal votes		651	2.09	−0.52
Turnout		31,086	92.34	−0.84
Two-party-preferred result
Labor	Nikki Boyd	16,953	57.68	+21.34
Liberal National	Seath Holswich	12,440	42.32	−21.34
Labor gain from Liberal National		Swing	+21.34	

=== Pumicestone ===
2015 Queensland state election: Pumicestone
Party	Candidate	Votes	%	±%
Liberal National	Lisa France	13,975	42.13	−11.02
Labor	Rick Williams	13,589	40.97	+10.53
Palmer United	Blair Verrier	2,451	7.39	+7.39
Greens	Daniel O'Connell	1,824	5.50	−0.55
Independent	Bevan Collingwood	901	2.72	+2.72
Independent	Denis Johnson	431	1.30	+1.30
Total formal votes		33,171	97.79	+0.10
Informal votes		749	2.21	−0.10
Turnout		33,920	90.24	−1.35
Two-party-preferred result
Labor	Rick Williams	16,166	52.08	+14.15
Liberal National	Lisa France	14,874	47.92	−14.15
Labor gain from Liberal National		Swing	+14.15	

=== Redcliffe ===
2015 Queensland state election: Redcliffe
Party	Candidate	Votes	%	±%
Labor	Yvette D'Ath	14,399	47.24	+16.48
Liberal National	Kerri-Anne Dooley	11,497	37.72	−11.52
Greens	Peter Johnson	1,698	5.57	−1.16
Palmer United	Steven Griffith	1,477	4.85	+4.85
Family First	Mark A White	710	2.33	−2.20
Independent	Shayne Jarvis	701	2.30	+2.30
Total formal votes		30,482	98.01	+0.39
Informal votes		620	1.99	−0.39
Turnout		31,102	90.98	−0.13
Two-party-preferred result
Labor	Yvette D'Ath	16,602	57.58	+17.68
Liberal National	Kerri-Anne Dooley	12,230	42.42	−17.68
Labor hold		Swing	+17.68	

=== Redlands ===
2015 Queensland state election: Redlands
Party	Candidate	Votes	%	±%
Liberal National	Matt McEachan	13,340	43.86	−21.94
Labor	Deborah Kellie	10,442	34.33	+10.28
Greens	David Keogh	2,261	7.43	−2.72
Independent	Sheena Hewlett	1,939	6.37	+6.37
Palmer United	Susan Bylett	1,809	5.95	+5.95
Family First	Carolyn Ferrando	625	2.05	+2.05
Total formal votes		30,416	97.67	+0.10
Informal votes		726	2.33	−0.10
Turnout		31,142	91.52	−0.64
Two-party-preferred result
Liberal National	Matt McEachan	14,399	52.23	−18.87
Labor	Deborah Kellie	13,167	47.77	+18.87
Liberal National hold		Swing	−18.87	

=== Rockhampton ===
2015 Queensland state election: Rockhampton
Party	Candidate	Votes	%	±%
Labor	Bill Byrne	15,432	52.88	+13.09
Liberal National	Bridie Luva	8,869	30.39	−1.37
Greens	Michelle Taylor	1,863	6.38	+2.93
Family First	Sally-Anne Vincent	1,703	5.84	+3.18
Independent	Anne O'Connor	1,317	4.51	+3.48
Total formal votes		29,184	97.27	+0.26
Informal votes		818	2.73	−0.26
Turnout		30,002	91.76	+0.03
Two-party-preferred result
Labor	Bill Byrne	17,301	63.87	+9.92
Liberal National	Bridie Luva	9,787	36.13	−9.92
Labor hold		Swing	+9.92	

=== Sandgate ===
2015 Queensland state election: Sandgate
Party	Candidate	Votes	%	±%
Labor	Stirling Hinchliffe	14,802	49.74	+12.09
Liberal National	Kerry Millard	10,967	36.85	−6.90
Greens	John Harbison	3,033	10.19	+1.21
Independent	Hamish Gray	959	3.22	+1.58
Total formal votes		29,761	98.09	+0.33
Informal votes		580	1.91	−0.33
Turnout		30,341	91.90	−1.16
Two-party-preferred result
Labor	Stirling Hinchliffe	17,262	60.10	+12.97
Liberal National	Kerry Millard	11,462	39.90	−12.97
Labor gain from Liberal National		Swing	+12.97	

=== South Brisbane ===
2015 Queensland state election: South Brisbane
Party	Candidate	Votes	%	±%
Labor	Jackie Trad	12,355	42.71	+4.15
Liberal National	Fiona Ward	9,321	32.22	−5.85
Greens	Jonathan Sri	6,320	21.85	+3.78
Independent	Karel Boele	930	3.22	+1.32
Total formal votes		28,926	98.35	+0.42
Informal votes		484	1.65	−0.42
Turnout		29,410	86.75	−0.36
Two-party-preferred result
Labor	Jackie Trad	17,697	63.79	+9.13
Liberal National	Fiona Ward	10,045	36.21	−9.13
Labor hold		Swing	+9.13	

=== Southern Downs ===
2015 Queensland state election: Southern Downs
Party	Candidate	Votes	%	±%
Liberal National	Lawrence Springborg	19,275	62.79	−3.83
Labor	Louise Ryan	7,201	23.46	+10.05
Greens	Elizabeth Ure	2,200	7.17	+3.25
Family First	John Spellman	2,022	6.59	+4.39
Total formal votes		30,698	98.01	−0.26
Informal votes		623	1.99	+0.26
Turnout		31,321	92.46	+0.13
Two-party-preferred result
Liberal National	Lawrence Springborg	20,008	69.20	−10.57
Labor	Louise Ryan	8,906	30.80	+10.57
Liberal National hold		Swing	−10.57	

=== Southport ===
2015 Queensland state election: Southport
Party	Candidate	Votes	%	±%
Liberal National	Rob Molhoek	13,287	45.92	−9.92
Labor	Rowan Holzberger	10,153	35.09	+6.66
Greens	Petrina Maizey	2,446	8.45	+1.76
Palmer United	Nicole Stanton	2,402	8.30	+8.30
Independent	Matthew Mackechnie	646	2.23	+0.64
Total formal votes		28,934	97.19	+0.12
Informal votes		836	2.81	−0.12
Turnout		29,770	85.30	−2.29
Two-party-preferred result
Liberal National	Rob Molhoek	14,133	53.24	−11.48
Labor	Rowan Holzberger	12,415	46.76	+11.48
Liberal National hold		Swing	−11.48	

=== Springwood ===
2015 Queensland state election: Springwood
Party	Candidate	Votes	%	±%
Liberal National	John Grant	12,547	42.08	−13.58
Labor	Mick de Brenni	12,260	41.12	+13.13
Greens	Janina Leo	2,595	8.70	+2.03
Palmer United	Peter Chamberlain	1,504	5.04	+5.04
Family First	Chris Lawrie	908	3.05	+0.09
Total formal votes		29,814	98.13	+0.27
Informal votes		567	1.87	−0.27
Turnout		30,381	90.97	−0.38
Two-party-preferred result
Labor	Mick de Brenni	14,661	51.73	+17.12
Liberal National	John Grant	13,678	48.27	−17.12
Labor gain from Liberal National		Swing	+17.12	

=== Stafford ===
2015 Queensland state election: Stafford
Party	Candidate	Votes	%	±%
Labor	Anthony Lynham	13,824	48.14	+14.57
Liberal National	Bob Andersen	10,822	37.69	−12.54
Greens	Anne Boccabella	4,069	14.17	+2.87
Total formal votes		28,715	98.35	+0.25
Informal votes		482	1.65	−0.25
Turnout		29,197	91.16	−0.20
Two-party-preferred result
Labor	Anthony Lynham	16,590	59.59	+16.65
Liberal National	Bob Andersen	11,249	40.41	−16.65
Labor hold		Swing	+16.65	

=== Stretton ===
2015 Queensland state election: Stretton
Party	Candidate	Votes	%	±%
Labor	Duncan Pegg	11,876	41.39	+12.67
Liberal National	Freya Ostapovitch	10,884	37.93	−8.92
Independent	David Forde	4,431	15.44	−3.51
Greens	Brian Sadler	1,502	5.23	−0.25
Total formal votes		28,693	97.99	+0.42
Informal votes		588	2.01	−0.42
Turnout		29,281	88.56	−1.59
Two-party-preferred result
Labor	Duncan Pegg	14,386	54.98	+14.54
Liberal National	Freya Ostapovitch	11,778	45.02	−14.54
Labor gain from Liberal National		Swing	+14.54	

=== Sunnybank ===
2015 Queensland state election: Sunnybank
Party	Candidate	Votes	%	±%
Labor	Peter Russo	12,993	49.27	+16.54
Liberal National	Mark Stewart	10,537	39.96	−12.74
Greens	Gordon King	2,839	10.77	+1.21
Total formal votes		26,369	97.68	+0.47
Informal votes		626	2.32	−0.47
Turnout		26,995	87.67	−1.27
Two-party-preferred result
Labor	Peter Russo	14,564	57.19	+17.42
Liberal National	Mark Stewart	10,901	42.81	−17.42
Labor gain from Liberal National		Swing	+17.42	

=== Surfers Paradise ===
2015 Queensland state election: Surfers Paradise
Party	Candidate	Votes	%	±%
Liberal National	John-Paul Langbroek	17,569	61.06	−11.57
Labor	Josh Blundell-Thornton	6,544	22.74	+6.20
Greens	Helen Hunt	2,221	7.72	+0.60
Palmer United	Stephen Gardner	1,749	6.08	+6.08
Family First	Jonathon Scoones	692	2.40	−1.31
Total formal votes		28,775	97.94	+0.18
Informal votes		605	2.06	−0.18
Turnout		29,380	84.12	−2.57
Two-party-preferred result
Liberal National	John-Paul Langbroek	18,405	69.21	−10.29
Labor	Josh Blundell-Thornton	8,188	30.79	+10.29
Liberal National hold		Swing	−10.29	

=== Thuringowa ===
2015 Queensland state election: Thuringowa
Party	Candidate	Votes	%	±%
Labor	Aaron Harper	11,584	39.51	+12.15
Liberal National	Sam Cox	9,945	33.92	−2.22
Palmer United	Ian Ferguson	3,407	11.62	+11.62
One Nation	Jeff Knuth	2,161	7.37	+7.37
Greens	Karen Thompson	1,028	3.51	−0.12
Family First	Michael Waters	617	2.10	−0.65
Independent	Margaret Bell	579	1.97	+1.97
Total formal votes		29,321	97.37	+0.07
Informal votes		792	2.63	−0.07
Turnout		30,113	89.49	−0.29
Two-party-preferred result
Labor	Aaron Harper	14,312	55.54	+6.92
Liberal National	Sam Cox	11,456	44.46	−6.92
Labor gain from Liberal National		Swing	+6.92	

=== Toowoomba North ===
2015 Queensland state election: Toowoomba North
Party	Candidate	Votes	%	±%
Liberal National	Trevor Watts	13,932	44.41	−5.35
Labor	Kerry Shine	12,166	38.78	+6.49
Palmer United	Mandeep Sandhu	1,578	5.03	+5.03
Greens	Ken Gover	1,430	4.56	−0.32
Katter's Australian	Ken Elliott	1,050	3.35	−8.29
Family First	John Sands	871	2.78	+2.78
Independent	Greg Keane	347	1.11	−0.34
Total formal votes		31,374	98.11	−0.05
Informal votes		606	1.89	+0.05
Turnout		31,980	91.00	−1.36
Two-party-preferred result
Liberal National	Trevor Watts	14,999	51.61	−7.97
Labor	Kerry Shine	14,064	48.39	+7.97
Liberal National hold		Swing	−7.97	

=== Toowoomba South ===
2015 Queensland state election: Toowoomba South
Party	Candidate	Votes	%	±%
Liberal National	John McVeigh	16,851	55.33	−3.20
Labor	Graham Storey	10,601	34.81	+13.78
Greens	Anne Waters	3,003	9.86	+4.38
Total formal votes		30,455	97.54	−0.40
Informal votes		767	2.46	+0.40
Turnout		31,222	90.99	−0.95
Two-party-preferred result
Liberal National	John McVeigh	17,216	58.89	−12.73
Labor	Graham Storey	12,018	41.11	+12.73
Liberal National hold		Swing	−12.73	

=== Townsville ===
2015 Queensland state election: Townsville
Party	Candidate	Votes	%	±%
Labor	Scott Stewart	11,267	40.06	+10.79
Liberal National	John Hathaway	10,130	36.02	−2.62
Palmer United	Alan Birrell	2,697	9.59	+9.59
Greens	Gail Hamilton	2,356	8.38	+0.70
One Nation	Leanne Rissman	1,079	3.84	+3.84
Family First	Michael Punshon	596	2.12	−0.48
Total formal votes		28,125	97.87	+0.11
Informal votes		613	2.13	−0.11
Turnout		28,738	87.12	−0.38
Two-party-preferred result
Labor	Scott Stewart	14,280	55.69	+10.52
Liberal National	John Hathaway	11,360	44.31	−10.52
Labor gain from Liberal National		Swing	+10.52	

=== Warrego ===
2015 Queensland state election: Warrego
Party	Candidate	Votes	%	±%
Liberal National	Ann Leahy	13,285	54.96	−3.17
Labor	Mark O'Brien	6,398	26.47	+13.82
Palmer United	Guy Sara	2,179	9.01	+9.01
Independent	Ruth Golden	1,663	6.88	−6.31
Greens	Sandra Bayley	649	2.68	+0.70
Total formal votes		24,174	97.93	−0.47
Informal votes		510	2.07	+0.47
Turnout		24,684	91.45	−0.32
Two-party-preferred result
Liberal National	Ann Leahy	14,255	65.43	−9.63
Labor	Mark O'Brien	7,531	34.57	+9.63
Liberal National hold		Swing	−9.63	

=== Waterford ===
2015 Queensland state election: Waterford
Party	Candidate	Votes	%	±%
Labor	Shannon Fentiman	15,645	52.40	+13.77
Liberal National	Mike Latter	9,347	31.30	−8.31
Greens	Ray Smith	2,537	8.50	+1.49
Independent	Jeffrey Hodges	1,454	4.87	+3.49
Independent	Jason Dickson	876	2.93	+1.55
Total formal votes		29,859	96.95	+0.37
Informal votes		938	3.05	−0.37
Turnout		30,797	87.00	−2.31
Two-party-preferred result
Labor	Shannon Fentiman	17,820	63.33	+14.37
Liberal National	Mike Latter	10,319	36.67	−14.37
Labor gain from Liberal National		Swing	+14.37	

=== Whitsunday ===
2015 Queensland state election: Whitsunday
Party	Candidate	Votes	%	±%
Liberal National	Jason Costigan	13,474	41.76	−2.62
Labor	Bronwyn Taha	11,775	36.49	+9.07
Palmer United	Kylee Stanton	4,047	12.54	+12.54
Greens	Tony Fontes	1,972	6.11	+0.23
Independent	Dan Van Blarcom	997	3.09	+3.09
Total formal votes		32,265	97.89	−0.43
Informal votes		695	2.11	+0.43
Turnout		32,960	89.54	−0.85
Two-party-preferred result
Liberal National	Jason Costigan	14,565	50.38	−10.30
Labor	Bronwyn Taha	14,347	49.62	+10.30
Liberal National hold		Swing	−10.30	

=== Woodridge ===
2015 Queensland state election: Woodridge
Party	Candidate	Votes	%	±%
Labor	Cameron Dick	16,375	62.72	+15.97
Liberal National	Steve Viliamu	5,140	19.69	−16.23
Greens	Scott Thomson	1,922	7.36	−1.21
Independent	Trevor Palmer	1,718	6.58	+6.58
Independent	Dave Beard	954	3.65	+3.65
Total formal votes		26,109	96.49	+0.59
Informal votes		951	3.51	−0.59
Turnout		27,060	86.54	−1.50
Two-party-preferred result
Labor	Cameron Dick	18,437	75.95	+20.15
Liberal National	Steve Viliamu	5,839	24.05	−20.15
Labor hold		Swing	+20.15	

=== Yeerongpilly ===
2015 Queensland state election: Yeerongpilly
Party	Candidate	Votes	%	±%
Labor	Mark Bailey	13,148	43.07	+8.53
Liberal National	Leila Abukar	9,579	31.38	−11.84
Greens	Gillian Marshall-Pierce	5,084	16.66	+0.69
Independent	Carl Judge	1,837	6.02	+6.02
Palmer United	Georgina Walton	876	2.87	+2.87
Total formal votes		30,524	98.37	+0.08
Informal votes		507	1.63	−0.08
Turnout		31,031	90.33	−1.63
Two-party-preferred result
Labor	Mark Bailey	18,202	63.30	+14.74
Liberal National	Leila Abukar	10,551	36.70	−14.74
Labor gain from Liberal National		Swing	+14.74	
