= Electoral results for the district of Greenslopes =

Queensland, Australia, district election results

This is a list of electoral results for the electoral district of Greenslopes in Queensland state elections.

== Members for Greenslopes ==
Member	Party	Term
Keith Hooper	Liberal	1960–1977
Bill Hewitt	Liberal	1977–1983
Leisha Harvey	National	1983–1989
Gary Fenlon	Labor	1989–1995
Ted Radke	Liberal	1995–1998
Gary Fenlon	Labor	1998–2009
Cameron Dick	Labor	2009–2012
Ian Kaye	Liberal National	2012–2015
Joseph Kelly	Labor	2015–present

== Election results ==
=== Elections in the 2020s ===
2024 Queensland state election: Greenslopes
Party	Candidate	Votes	%	±%
Labor	Joe Kelly	12,205	35.55	−5.75
Liberal National	Andrew Newbold	11,711	34.11	+2.61
Greens	Rebecca White	9,049	26.35	+2.85
One Nation	Hugh Dickson	932	2.71	+0.21
Family First	Karine Davis	438	1.28	+1.28
Total formal votes		34,335	97.81	−0.26
Informal votes		767	2.19	+0.26
Turnout		35,120	90.60	+1.97
Two-party-preferred result
Labor	Joe Kelly	20,534	59.80	−3.40
Liberal National	Andrew Newbold	13,801	40.20	+3.40
Labor hold		Swing	−3.40	

2020 Queensland state election: Greenslopes
Party	Candidate	Votes	%	±%
Labor	Joe Kelly	13,426	41.33	−1.01
Liberal National	Andrew Newbold	10,238	31.52	−4.86
Greens	Victor Huml	7,609	23.43	+2.15
One Nation	John Booker	805	2.48	+2.48
Informed Medical Options	Jasmine (Jazzy) Melhop	403	1.24	+1.24
Total formal votes		32,481	98.07	+1.59
Informal votes		640	1.93	−1.59
Turnout		33,121	88.63	+0.15
Two-party-preferred result
Labor	Joe Kelly	20,529	63.20	+3.07
Liberal National	Andrew Newbold	11,952	36.80	−3.07
Labor hold		Swing	+3.07	

=== Elections in the 2010s ===
2017 Queensland state election: Greenslopes
Party	Candidate	Votes	%	±%
Labor	Joe Kelly	12,930	42.3	+0.0
Liberal National	Ian Kaye	11,110	36.4	−5.0
Greens	Victor Huml	6,498	21.3	+7.6
Total formal votes		30,538	96.5	−1.9
Informal votes		1,114	3.5	+1.9
Turnout		31,652	88.5	+1.7
Two-party-preferred result
Labor	Joe Kelly	18,364	60.1	+5.1
Liberal National	Ian Kaye	12,174	39.9	−5.1
Labor hold		Swing	+5.1	

2015 Queensland state election: Greenslopes
Party	Candidate	Votes	%	±%
Labor	Joe Kelly	12,077	42.42	+3.20
Liberal National	Ian Kaye	12,013	42.20	−5.67
Greens	Darren Ellis	3,682	12.93	+0.01
Family First	Matthew Darragh	696	2.44	+2.44
Total formal votes		28,468	98.42	+0.03
Informal votes		456	1.58	−0.03
Turnout		28,924	90.75	−1.26
Two-party-preferred result
Labor	Joe Kelly	14,947	54.25	+6.70
Liberal National	Ian Kaye	12,607	45.75	−6.70
Labor gain from Liberal National		Swing	+6.70	

2012 Queensland state election: Greenslopes
Party	Candidate	Votes	%	±%
Liberal National	Ian Kaye	13,076	47.87	+10.06
Labor	Cameron Dick	10,713	39.22	−7.06
Greens	Emma-Kate Rose	3,529	12.92	+0.35
Total formal votes		27,318	98.39	+0.01
Informal votes		448	1.61	−0.01
Turnout		27,766	92.01	+0.56
Two-party-preferred result
Liberal National	Ian Kaye	13,590	52.45	+9.39
Labor	Cameron Dick	12,318	47.55	−9.39
Liberal National gain from Labor		Swing	+9.39	

=== Elections in the 2000s ===
2009 Queensland state election: Greenslopes
Party	Candidate	Votes	%	±%
Labor	Cameron Dick	12,450	46.3	−5.0
Liberal National	Ian Kaye	10,172	37.8	+4.5
Greens	Darryl Rosin	3,382	12.6	+0.5
DS4SEQ	Brad Armstrong	455	1.7	+1.7
Independent	Doug Russell	444	1.7	+1.7
Total formal votes		26,903	98.3	
Informal votes		442	1.7	
Turnout		27,345	91.5	
Two-party-preferred result
Labor	Cameron Dick	14,368	56.9	−4.3
Liberal National	Ian Kaye	10,864	43.1	+4.3
Labor hold		Swing	−4.3	

2006 Queensland state election: Greenslopes
Party	Candidate	Votes	%	±%
Labor	Gary Fenlon	12,349	50.2	−2.5
Liberal	Melina Morgan	8,487	34.5	+0.3
Greens	Darryl Rosin	3,108	12.6	+3.0
Independent	Warren Simondson	670	2.7	−0.8
Total formal votes		24,614	98.4	−0.0
Informal votes		407	1.6	+0.0
Turnout		25,021	90.4	−1.1
Two-party-preferred result
Labor	Gary Fenlon	13,601	60.1	−0.9
Liberal	Melina Morgan	9,027	39.9	+0.9
Labor hold		Swing	−0.9	

2004 Queensland state election: Greenslopes
Party	Candidate	Votes	%	±%
Labor	Gary Fenlon	13,011	52.7	−2.7
Liberal	Natalie Garratt	8,460	34.2	+3.4
Greens	Darryl Rosin	2,375	9.6	−0.4
Independent	Warren Simondson	855	3.5	+3.5
Total formal votes		24,701	98.4	+0.4
Informal votes		398	1.6	−0.4
Turnout		25,099	91.5	−1.1
Two-party-preferred result
Labor	Gary Fenlon	14,064	61.0	−3.1
Liberal	Natalie Garratt	8,981	39.0	+3.1
Labor hold		Swing	−3.1	

2001 Queensland state election: Greenslopes
Party	Candidate	Votes	%	±%
Labor	Gary Fenlon	13,744	55.4	+6.7
Liberal	Andrew Edwards	7,639	30.8	−7.0
Greens	Sean Curley	2,491	10.0	+5.5
City Country Alliance	Greg Whitney	915	3.7	+3.7
Total formal votes		24,789	98.0	
Informal votes		498	2.0	
Turnout		25,287	92.6	
Two-party-preferred result
Labor	Gary Fenlon	14,791	64.1	+7.7
Liberal	Andrew Edwards	8,289	35.9	−7.7
Labor hold		Swing	+7.7	

=== Elections in the 1990s ===
1998 Queensland state election: Greenslopes
Party	Candidate	Votes	%	±%
Labor	Gary Fenlon	9,382	47.9	−2.0
Liberal	Ted Radke	7,902	40.3	−9.8
Greens	Libby Connors	901	4.6	+4.6
Democrats	John Cherry	586	3.0	+3.0
Independent	Nigel Freemarijuana	354	1.8	+1.8
Women's Party	Jenny Hughey	299	1.5	+1.5
Reform	Paul Feeney	167	0.9	+0.9
Total formal votes		19,591	98.6	+0.7
Informal votes		283	1.4	−0.7
Turnout		19,874	92.9	+0.6
Two-party-preferred result
Labor	Gary Fenlon	10,498	55.2	+5.3
Liberal	Ted Radke	8,530	44.8	−5.3
Labor gain from Liberal		Swing	+5.3	

1995 Queensland state election: Greenslopes
Party	Candidate	Votes	%	±%
Liberal	Ted Radke	9,607	50.1	+10.8
Labor	Gary Fenlon	9,566	49.9	−3.1
Total formal votes		19,173	97.9	−0.1
Informal votes		420	2.1	+0.1
Turnout		19,593	92.3	
Liberal gain from Labor		Swing	+7.3	

1992 Queensland state election: Greenslopes
Party	Candidate	Votes	%	±%
Labor	Gary Fenlon	10,639	53.0	−0.8
Liberal	Graham Young	7,888	39.3	+9.8
Greens	Simon Bliss	1,121	5.6	+5.6
Independent	Stephen Heather	424	2.1	+2.1
Total formal votes		20,072	98.0	
Informal votes		418	2.0	
Turnout		20,490	92.4	
Two-party-preferred result
Labor	Gary Fenlon	11,277	57.2	+1.0
Liberal	Graham Young	8,425	42.8	−1.0
Labor hold		Swing	+1.0	

=== Elections in the 1980s ===
1989 Queensland state election: Greenslopes
Party	Candidate	Votes	%	±%
Labor	Gary Fenlon	10,180	53.0	+16.5
Liberal	Graham Young	5,657	29.5	+1.3
National	Leisha Harvey	2,319	12.1	−20.4
Independent	Richard Tiainen	1,040	5.4	+5.4
Total formal votes		19,196	98.0	−0.3
Informal votes		389	2.0	+0.3
Turnout		19,585	92.4	+0.1
Two-party-preferred result
Labor	Gary Fenlon	10,673	55.6	+9.8
Liberal	Graham Young	8,523	44.4	+44.4
Labor gain from National		Swing	+9.8	

1986 Queensland state election: Greenslopes
Party	Candidate	Votes	%	±%
Labor	Fred Wright	6,772	36.5	−4.3
National	Leisha Harvey	6,026	32.5	+1.4
Liberal	Bill Hewitt	5,233	28.2	+0.1
Independent	Ron Smith	508	2.7	+2.7
Total formal votes		18,539	98.3	−0.4
Informal votes		316	1.7	+0.4
Turnout		18,855	92.3	+0.2
Two-party-preferred result
National	Leisha Harvey	10,053	54.2	+1.3
Labor	Fred Wright	8,486	45.8	−1.3
National hold		Swing	+1.3	

1983 Queensland state election: Greenslopes
Party	Candidate	Votes	%	±%
Labor	Robert Lauchland	5,715	40.8	+3.1
National	Leisha Harvey	4,358	31.1	+31.1
Liberal	Bill Hewitt	3,939	28.1	−34.2
Total formal votes		14,012	98.6	+0.8
Informal votes		199	1.4	−0.8
Turnout		14,211	92.1	+3.1
Two-party-preferred result
National	Leisha Harvey	7,610	54.3	+54.3
Labor	Robert Lauchland	6,402	45.7	+8.0
National gain from Liberal		Swing	N/A	

1980 Queensland state election: Greenslopes
Party	Candidate	Votes	%	±%
Liberal	Bill Hewitt	8,623	62.3	+23.8
Labor	Graeme Kinnear	5,217	37.7	+8.0
Total formal votes		13,840	97.8	−1.1
Informal votes		312	2.2	+1.1
Turnout		14,152	89.0	−2.8
Liberal hold		Swing	−0.1	

=== Elections in the 1970s ===
1977 Queensland state election: Greenslopes
Party	Candidate	Votes	%	±%
Liberal	Bill Hewitt	5,663	38.5	−28.2
Labor	Lewin Blazevich	4,371	29.7	+0.6
National	Noel Cannon	2,828	19.2	+19.2
Democrats	David Anning	1,833	12.5	+12.5
Total formal votes		14,695	98.9	
Informal votes		164	1.1	
Turnout		14,859	91.8	
Two-party-preferred result
Liberal	Bill Hewitt	9,170	62.4	−8.3
Labor	Lewin Blazevich	5,525	37.6	+8.3
Liberal hold		Swing	−8.3	

1974 Queensland state election: Greenslopes
Party	Candidate	Votes	%	±%
Liberal	Keith Hooper	8,269	66.7	−14.1
Labor	Joseph Sciacca	3,615	29.2	−13.1
Queensland Labor	Harry Wright	517	4.2	−3.4
Total formal votes		12,401	98.9	+0.4
Informal votes		137	1.1	−0.4
Turnout		12,538	89.0	−4.1
Two-party-preferred result
Liberal	Keith Hooper	8,709	70.2	+15.2
Labor	Joseph Sciacca	3,692	29.8	−15.2
Liberal hold		Swing	+15.2	

1972 Queensland state election: Greenslopes
Party	Candidate	Votes	%	±%
Liberal	Keith Hooper	5,566	48.8	−5.7
Labor	Lewis Wyvill	4,824	42.3	+6.7
Queensland Labor	Denis Cochran	871	7.6	−2.3
Independent	Lynn Aberdeen	137	1.2	+1.2
Total formal votes		11,398	98.5	
Informal votes		178	1.5	
Turnout		11,576	93.1	
Two-party-preferred result
Liberal	Keith Hooper	6,430	55.0	−9.3
Labor	Lewis Wyvill	4,968	45.0	+9.3
Liberal hold		Swing	−9.3	

=== Elections in the 1960s ===
1969 Queensland state election: Greenslopes
Party	Candidate	Votes	%	±%
Liberal	Keith Hooper	5,953	54.5	−0.3
Labor	Kath Walker	3,882	35.6	−0.1
Queensland Labor	Harry Wright	1,083	9.9	+0.4
Total formal votes		10,918	98.5	−0.2
Informal votes		171	1.5	+0.2
Turnout		11,089	92.8	−1.1
Two-party-preferred result
Liberal	Keith Hooper	6,835	62.6	0.0
Labor	Kath Walker	4,083	37.4	0.0
Liberal hold		Swing	0.0	

1966 Queensland state election: Greenslopes
Party	Candidate	Votes	%	±%
Liberal	Keith Hooper	6,074	54.8	−1.6
Labor	Cecil Chandler	3,952	35.7	+0.9
Queensland Labor	Harry Wright	1,054	9.5	+2.2
Total formal votes		11,080	98.7	+0.6
Informal votes		150	1.3	−0.6
Turnout		11,230	93.9	−1.1
Two-party-preferred result
Liberal	Keith Hooper	6,932	62.6	−0.3
Labor	Cecil Chandler	4,148	37.4	+0.3
Liberal hold		Swing	−0.3	

1963 Queensland state election: Greenslopes
Party	Candidate	Votes	%	±%
Liberal	Keith Hooper	6,272	56.4	+1.0
Labor	John Hughes	3,876	34.8	+6.1
Queensland Labor	Terry Burns	810	7.3	−7.5
Social Credit	Eric Allen	111	1.0	−0.1
Communist	Edmund Crisp	56	0.5	+0.5
Total formal votes		11,125	98.1	−0.6
Informal votes		213	1.9	+0.6
Turnout		11,338	95.0	+1.7
Two-party-preferred result
Liberal	Keith Hooper	6,998	62.9	
Labor	John Hughes	4,127	37.1	
Liberal hold		Swing	N/A	

1960 Queensland state election: Greenslopes
Party	Candidate	Votes	%	±%
Liberal	Keith Hooper	6,230	55.4	
Labor	John Hughes	3,225	28.7	
Queensland Labor	Michael Lyons	1,665	14.8	
Social Credit	Eric Allen	119	1.1	
Total formal votes		11,239	98.7	
Informal votes		147	1.3	
Turnout		11,386	93.3	
Liberal win		(new seat)		
