= Electoral results for the district of Yeerongpilly =

Queensland, Australia, district election results

This is a list of electoral results for the electoral district of Yeerongpilly in Queensland state elections.

== Members for Yeerongpilly ==
Member	Party	Term
Matt Foley	Labor	2001–2004
Simon Finn	Labor	2004–2012
Carl Judge	Liberal National	2012
Carl Judge	Independent	2012–2013
Carl Judge	Palmer United	2013–2014
Carl Judge	Independent	2014–2015
Mark Bailey	Labor	2015–2017

== Election results ==
=== Elections in the 2010s ===
2015 Queensland state election: Yeerongpilly
Party	Candidate	Votes	%	±%
Labor	Mark Bailey	13,148	43.07	+8.53
Liberal National	Leila Abukar	9,579	31.38	−11.84
Greens	Gillian Marshall-Pierce	5,084	16.66	+0.69
Independent	Carl Judge	1,837	6.02	+6.02
Palmer United	Georgina Walton	876	2.87	+2.87
Total formal votes		30,524	98.37	+0.08
Informal votes		507	1.63	−0.08
Turnout		31,031	90.33	−1.63
Two-party-preferred result
Labor	Mark Bailey	18,202	63.30	+14.74
Liberal National	Leila Abukar	10,551	36.70	−14.74
Labor gain from Liberal National		Swing	+14.74	

2012 Queensland state election: Yeerongpilly
Party	Candidate	Votes	%	±%
Liberal National	Carl Judge	12,356	43.22	+8.04
Labor	Simon Finn	9,875	34.54	−11.74
Greens	Libby Connors	4,563	15.96	+0.00
Katter's Australian	Kathleen Hewlett	1,312	4.59	+4.59
Family First	Alexandra Todd	480	1.68	+1.68
Total formal votes		28,586	98.28	−0.09
Informal votes		499	1.72	+0.09
Turnout		29,085	91.96	+0.87
Two-party-preferred result
Liberal National	Carl Judge	13,516	51.44	+10.17
Labor	Simon Finn	12,760	48.56	−10.17
Liberal National gain from Labor		Swing	+10.17	

=== Elections in the 2000s ===
2009 Queensland state election: Yeerongpilly
Party	Candidate	Votes	%	±%
Labor	Simon Finn	12,846	46.3	–4.4
Liberal National	Julianna Kneebone	9,766	35.2	+4.0
Greens	Libby Connors	4,431	16.0	+0.3
DS4SEQ	Tom McCosker	716	2.6	+2.6
Total formal votes		27,759	98.4	+0.2
Informal votes		473	1.6	−0.2
Turnout		28,219	91.1	
Two-party-preferred result
Labor	Simon Finn	15,236	58.7	–4.1
Liberal National	Julianna Kneebone	10,705	41.3	+4.1
Labor hold		Swing	–4.1	

2006 Queensland state election: Yeerongpilly
Party	Candidate	Votes	%	±%
Labor	Simon Finn	12,445	51.6	−2.0
Liberal	Marie Jackson	7,340	30.5	+4.7
Greens	Sean McConnell	3,746	15.5	+2.4
Independent	Rod Watson	564	2.3	+2.3
Total formal votes		24,095	98.1	+0.2
Informal votes		473	1.9	−0.2
Turnout		24,568	90.6	−1.2
Two-party-preferred result
Labor	Simon Finn	14,263	63.7	−3.4
Liberal	Marie Jackson	8,112	36.3	+3.4
Labor hold		Swing	−3.4	

2004 Queensland state election: Yeerongpilly
Party	Candidate	Votes	%	±%
Labor	Simon Finn	13,054	53.6	−8.2
Liberal	Michael Kucera	6,289	25.8	+4.5
Greens	Wayne Wadsworth	3,191	13.1	+5.4
One Nation	Barry Weedon	1,102	4.5	+4.5
Independent	Andrew Lamb	729	3.0	+3.0
Total formal votes		24,365	97.9	+0.1
Informal votes		509	2.1	−0.1
Turnout		24,874	91.8	−0.4
Two-party-preferred result
Labor	Simon Finn	14,822	67.1	−5.1
Liberal	Michael Kucera	7,272	32.9	+5.1
Labor hold		Swing	−5.1	

2001 Queensland state election: Yeerongpilly
Party	Candidate	Votes	%	±%
Labor	Matt Foley	15,135	61.8	+8.8
Liberal	Russell Miles	5,215	21.3	−4.7
Greens	Stephen Burchall	1,877	7.7	+2.9
Independent	Michael Bond	1,516	6.2	+6.2
Independent	Darryl Wheeley	731	3.0	+3.0
Total formal votes		24,474	97.8	
Informal votes		545	2.2	
Turnout		25,019	92.2	
Two-party-preferred result
Labor	Matt Foley	16,210	72.2	+8.7
Liberal	Russell Miles	6,249	27.8	−8.7
Labor hold		Swing	+8.7	
