= Electoral results for the district of Mudgeeraba =

Queensland, Australia, district election results

This is a list of electoral results for the electoral district of Mudgeeraba in Queensland state elections.

== Members for Mudgeeraba ==
Member	Party	Term
Dianne Reilly	Labor	2001–2009
Ros Bates	Liberal National	2009–present

== Election results ==
=== Elections in the 2020s ===
2024 Queensland state election: Mudgeeraba
Party	Candidate	Votes	%	±%
Liberal National	Ros Bates	17,842	51.69	+2.69
Labor	Sophie Lynch	8,711	25.23	−1.27
One Nation	Carl Mocnik	3,545	10.27	+2.57
Greens	Scott Turner	3,261	9.45	+0.55
Family First	Samuel Buckley	1,161	3.36	+3.36
Total formal votes		34,520	95.57	
Informal votes		1,601	4.43	
Turnout		36,121	87.79	
Two-party-preferred result
Liberal National	Ros Bates	22,053	63.88	+3.78
Labor	Sophie Lynch	12,467	36.12	−3.78
Liberal National hold		Swing	+3.78	

2020 Queensland state election: Mudgeeraba
Party	Candidate	Votes	%	±%
Liberal National	Ros Bates	15,640	48.96	+2.90
Labor	Maxim Otten-Kamp	8,472	26.52	+3.05
Greens	Scott Turner	2,857	8.94	−0.35
One Nation	Andrew Liddell	2,464	7.71	−10.07
Animal Justice	Lindon Cox	624	1.95	+1.95
United Australia	Brandon McMahon	565	1.77	+1.77
Independent	Gary Pead	528	1.65	+1.65
Civil Liberties & Motorists	Mark Pytellek	299	0.94	+0.94
Independent	Bill Sherwood	273	0.85	−1.25
Independent	Leith Erikson	224	0.70	+0.70
Total formal votes		31,946	95.04	+0.16
Informal votes		1,667	4.96	−0.16
Turnout		33,613	87.72	+1.31
Two-party-preferred result
Liberal National	Ros Bates	19,196	60.09	+0.24
Labor	Maxim Otten-Kamp	12,750	39.91	−0.24
Liberal National hold		Swing	+0.24	

=== Elections in the 2010s ===
2017 Queensland state election: Mudgeeraba
Party	Candidate	Votes	%	±%
Liberal National	Ros Bates	13,695	46.1	−3.9
Labor	Paul Taylor	6,977	23.5	−4.5
One Nation	Andrew Liddell	5,288	17.8	+17.8
Greens	Rod Duncan	2,763	9.3	+1.4
Independent	Bill Sherwood	625	2.1	+0.3
Independent	Jill Pead	385	1.3	+1.3
Total formal votes		29,733	94.9	−2.4
Informal votes		1,605	5.1	+2.4
Turnout		31,338	86.4	+2.3
Two-party-preferred result
Liberal National	Ros Bates	17,795	59.8	−0.6
Labor	Paul Taylor	11,938	40.2	+0.6
Liberal National hold		Swing	−0.6	

2015 Queensland state election: Mudgeeraba
Party	Candidate	Votes	%	±%
Liberal National	Ros Bates	14,846	50.58	−11.11
Labor	Georgi Leader	8,117	27.66	+9.92
Greens	Roger Brisbane	2,279	7.76	+0.09
Palmer United	Benedict Figueroa	2,244	7.65	+7.65
Family First	Chris Petersen	1,339	4.56	−0.67
Independent	Bill Sherwood	525	1.79	+1.79
Total formal votes		29,350	97.29	−0.43
Informal votes		819	2.71	+0.43
Turnout		30,169	88.43	−1.18
Two-party-preferred result
Liberal National	Ros Bates	16,151	60.97	−14.96
Labor	Georgi Leader	10,337	39.03	+14.96
Liberal National hold		Swing	−14.96	

2012 Queensland state election: Mudgeeraba
Party	Candidate	Votes	%	±%
Liberal National	Ros Bates	16,534	61.69	+15.47
Labor	Aaron Santelises	4,753	17.73	−21.10
Katter's Australian	Kevin Swan	2,056	7.67	+7.67
Greens	Sally Spain	2,056	7.67	+0.63
Family First	Barrie Nicholson	1,402	5.23	+1.41
Total formal votes		26,801	97.72	−0.04
Informal votes		626	2.28	+0.04
Turnout		27,427	89.61	−0.77
Two-party-preferred result
Liberal National	Ros Bates	17,707	75.93	+22.01
Labor	Aaron Santelises	5,612	24.07	−22.01
Liberal National hold		Swing	+22.01	

=== Elections in the 2000s ===
2009 Queensland state election: Mudgeeraba
Party	Candidate	Votes	%	±%
Liberal National	Ros Bates	11,724	46.2	+4.6
Labor	Dianne Reilly	9,850	38.8	−6.6
Greens	Julian Woolford	1,786	7.0	−0.6
DS4SEQ	Tom Hardin	1,037	4.1	+4.1
Family First	James Tayler	969	3.8	−1.5
Total formal votes		25,366	97.4	
Informal votes		581	2.6	
Turnout		25,947	90.4	
Two-party-preferred result
Liberal National	Ros Bates	12,717	53.9	+6.6
Labor	Dianne Reilly	10,868	46.1	−6.6
Liberal National gain from Labor		Swing	+6.6	

2006 Queensland state election: Mudgeeraba
Party	Candidate	Votes	%	±%
Labor	Dianne Reilly	11,724	45.1	+0.6
Liberal	Ros Bates	10,663	41.0	−1.1
Greens	Gary Pead	1,890	7.3	−0.3
Family First	James Tayler	1,728	6.6	+6.6
Total formal votes		26,005	97.5	−0.2
Informal votes		664	2.5	+0.2
Turnout		26,669	89.2	−0.2
Two-party-preferred result
Labor	Dianne Reilly	12,941	52.9	+1.0
Liberal	Ros Bates	11,506	47.1	−1.0
Labor hold		Swing	+1.0	

2004 Queensland state election: Mudgeeraba
Party	Candidate	Votes	%	±%
Labor	Dianne Reilly	10,994	44.5	+3.2
Liberal	Scott Paterson	10,386	42.1	+11.5
Greens	Nicole Chegwyn	1,880	7.6	−1.3
One Nation	Steve Moir	1,075	4.4	+4.4
Independent	Gary Pead	348	1.4	+1.4
Total formal votes		24,683	97.7	+0.9
Informal votes		577	2.3	−0.9
Turnout		25,260	89.4	−1.7
Two-party-preferred result
Labor	Dianne Reilly	11,864	51.9	−4.9
Liberal	Scott Paterson	11,017	48.1	+4.9
Labor hold		Swing	−4.9	

2001 Queensland state election: Mudgeeraba
Party	Candidate	Votes	%	±%
Labor	Dianne Reilly	9,371	41.3	+14.0
Liberal	Ray Connor	6,952	30.6	−8.8
Independent	Matt Keys	3,596	15.9	+15.9
Greens	Inge Light	2,025	8.9	+3.3
Independent	Dorothy Lyons	408	1.8	+1.8
Independent	Ronald Bradley	330	1.5	+1.5
Total formal votes		22,682	96.8	
Informal votes		750	3.2	
Turnout		23,432	91.1	
Two-party-preferred result
Labor	Dianne Reilly	10,585	56.8	+18.4
Liberal	Ray Connor	8,060	43.2	−18.4
Labor gain from Liberal		Swing	+18.4	
