= Electoral results for the district of Miller =

Queensland, Australia, district election results

This is a list of electoral results for the electoral district of Miller in Queensland state elections.

== Members for Miller ==
Member	Party	Term
Mark Bailey	Labor	2017–present

== Election results ==
=== Elections in the 2020s ===
2024 Queensland state election: Miller
Party	Candidate	Votes	%	±%
Labor	Mark Bailey	12,378	37.84	−4.15
Liberal National	Clio Padayachee	11,122	34.00	+3.43
Greens	Liam Flenady	7,706	23.56	+2.92
One Nation	Ashley Pettit	990	3.02	+1.10
Animal Justice	Carola Veloso-Busich	517	1.58	+1.58
Total formal votes		32,713	98.16	+0.06
Informal votes		612	1.84	−0.06
Turnout		33,325	91.51	+0.10
Two-party-preferred result
Labor	Mark Bailey	19,828	60.61	−3.21
Liberal National	Clio Padayachee	12,885	39.39	+3.21
Labor hold		Swing	−3.21	

2020 Queensland state election: Miller
Party	Candidate	Votes	%	±%
Labor	Mark Bailey	13,407	41.99	+3.95
Liberal National	Paul Darwen	9,759	30.57	−6.03
Greens	Patsy O'Brien	6,590	20.64	−1.27
Legalise Cannabis	Josip Zirdum	1,004	3.14	+3.14
One Nation	Maria Packer	613	1.92	+1.92
Independent Progressives	Edward Carroll	380	1.19	+1.19
United Australia	Christian Julius	174	0.54	+0.54
Total formal votes		31,927	98.10	+0.75
Informal votes		620	1.90	−0.75
Turnout		32,547	91.41	+2.34
Two-party-preferred result
Labor	Mark Bailey	20,376	63.82	+5.64
Liberal National	Paul Darwen	11,551	36.18	−5.64
Labor hold		Swing	+5.64	

=== Elections in the 2010s ===
2017 Queensland state election: Miller
Party	Candidate	Votes	%	±%
Labor	Mark Bailey	11,403	38.0	+0.9
Liberal National	Belinda Kippen	10,969	36.6	−2.7
Greens	Deniz Clarke	6,567	21.9	+4.9
Independent	Ted Starr	1,033	3.4	+3.4
Total formal votes		29,972	97.3	−1.2
Informal votes		816	2.7	+1.2
Turnout		30,788	89.1	−2.3
Two-party-preferred result
Labor	Mark Bailey	17,439	58.2	+2.6
Liberal National	Belinda Kippen	12,533	41.8	−2.6
Labor hold		Swing	+2.6	
