= Leila Abukar =

Somali-Australian political activist

Leila Abukar ليلى أبو بكر
- Born: 1974 or 1975 (age 51–52); Somalia
- Education: University of Queensland
- Occupation: political activist

Leila Abukar (Somali: Leyla Abukar, Arabic: ليلى أبو بكر) is a Somali-Australian political activist.

== Personal life ==
Abukar was born between 1974 and 1975 in Somalia. She attended a private school in Mogadishu.

When the civil war broke out in 1991, her father and eldest brother were killed by militants. Abukar's mother subsequently took the family to a UN asylum center in Kenya. The teenager therein volunteered as an office interpreter, teaching children and raising awareness on reproductive health. In 1997, Abukar moved alone to Australia through a women-at-risk program run by the Australian High Commission. Soroptimist International group workers helped her settle into her new surroundings in Moorooka, Brisbane, with her family later joining her.

For her tertiary education, Abukar earned a bachelor's degree in International Relations from the University of Queensland. She also holds a post-graduate diploma and master's degree in the discipline. Additionally, she has qualifications in Disability Support and Conflict Resolution.

Abukar is Muslim. She is multilingual, speaking seven languages. A mother of two children, a son (Abdi) and daughter (Diamond), she and her family reside in the Brisbane suburb of Yeerongpilly.

== Career ==
Abukar began her career as an interpreter for the Australian Department of Immigration. She has significant experience as a Community Advocate, working in a broad range of senior management posts with government, council and non-profit organisations.

In addition, Abukar was previously a member of the Queensland Multicultural Roundtable, the Refugees Resettlement Advisory Council, and the Council for Multicultural Australia. She also campaigned against female genital mutilation.

In 2014–2015, Abukar ran for office as the Liberal National Party of Queensland candidate for the Yeerongpilly electoral district. She vied for the seat in a field of four other aspirants. If elected, she would have become the first Somali and Muslim to serve in the Queensland Parliament. Abukar came in second place, earning 31.4% of the total vote in the first round run-off and 36.7% in the final round against the eventual winner Mark Bailey of the Australian Labor Party.

== Awards ==
Abukar has received various awards and recognition for her societal work. In 2001, she was presented a Centenary Medal by the Australian government for her contributions to Crisis Counselling, Advocacy and Settlement vis-a-vis the Somali community and other immigrant populations in Queensland.
