= Ted Radke =

Australian politician

Member of the Queensland Legislative Assembly for Greenslopes
- In office 15 July 1995 – 13 June 1998
- Preceded by: Gary Fenlon
- Succeeded by: Gary Fenlon

Personal details
- Born: Theodore Paul Radke; 3 November 1958 (age 67) Beaudesert, Queensland, Australia
- Party: Liberal Party
- Education: Griffith University
- Occupation: Teacher

Theodore Paul "Ted" Radke (born 3 November 1958) is a former Australian politician.

He was born at Beaudesert and worked as a teacher at TAFE colleges. His qualifications included an associate diploma in rural techniques (horticulture), a Bachelor of Applied Science (oenology), a graduate diploma in business administration (Queensland University of Technology, and a graduate diploma in adult and vocational education (Griffith University). He joined the Liberal Party in 1985. After an unsuccessful run for Cunningham in 1992, he was elected to the Queensland Legislative Assembly as the member for Greenslopes in 1995. He lost his seat in 1998.

Parliament of Queensland
Preceded by Gary Fenlon	Member for Greenslopes; 1995–1998	Succeeded by Gary Fenlon
