= Leisha Harvey =

Queensland, Australia politician

Member of the Queensland Legislative Assembly for Greenslopes
- In office 22 October 1983 – 2 December 1989
- Preceded by: Bill Hewitt
- Succeeded by: Gary Fenlon

Personal details
- Born: Leisha Teresa Piasecki; 4 April 1947 (age 79) Münsingen, West Germany
- Party: National Party
- Spouse: Barry Noel Harvey (m.1983)
- Education: Griffith University
- Occupation: Teacher, Businessperson

Leisha Teresa Harvey (née Piasecki, born 4 April 1947) is a former Australian politician. She was a National Party member of the Legislative Assembly of Queensland from 1983 to 1989, representing the electorate of Greenslopes. She served as Minister for Health in the government of Mike Ahern government from 1987 until her sacking in January 1989. She lost her seat at the election that December, and was not long out of Parliament when she was charged with numerous counts of misappropriation of public funds concerning her usage of her official credit card. After a high-profile trial in 1990 and subsequent conviction, she spent five months in prison and a further seven months in home detention.

== Background ==
Harvey was born in 1947 to displaced Polish parents in Münsingen, West Germany. The family immigrated to Queensland when she was three, and she was raised in Brisbane thereafter, attending St Mary Immaculate Convent, Annerley, Buranda State School, St Ursula's College and Coorparoo State High School. She studied education at Griffith University and was a teacher in the special skills program at Springwood High School for most of her career. Raised as a Roman Catholic, Harvey eventually became a Pentecostal and joined Garden City Christian Church in Brisbane's southern suburbs. Harvey married in 1965 and had one son and one daughter, but divorced in 1975. She remarried in 1983.

Harvey contested and won National preselection for the seat of Greenslopes at the 1983 election. On paper, it seemed unusual for the Nationals to contest a seat in the Brisbane suburbs, since they are traditionally an agrarian conservative party. However, the urban–rural divide is far less pronounced in Queensland than in other states. In a reverse of the situation both nationally and in most other states, the National Party had long been the senior party in the non-Labor Coalition, and had recently begun contesting seats in the Brisbane area.

At the time, the seat was considered safe for the Liberal Party, the National Party's longtime junior coalition partner. However, the Liberals tore up the Coalition agreement in the summer of 1983. The Nationals poured resources into Liberal-held seats in an attempt to destroy their former partners. On election day, Harvey achieved a large swing, easily defeating incumbent Liberal and former minister Bill Hewitt and taking Greenslopes for the National Party for the first time in its history. She actually pushed Hewitt into third place on the primary vote, and then defeated the Labor candidate on Liberal preferences. She was one of eight National MPs elected from greater Brisbane, enabling the Nationals to come within one seat of winning government in their own right. They picked up a majority when two Liberals crossed the floor.

As a backbencher, Harvey's speeches reflected her strong support of small business (having spent a period in small business herself), the rights of the aged and the need for consumer protection. She was staunchly opposed to sex discrimination, but equally opposed to affirmative action. An ardent opponent of homosexuality, she often stated that homosexuality would "never be legalised in Queensland." She faced a minor scandal before the 1986 election concerning use of her electorate printing allowances to aid her re-election, but was easily re-elected, and for a time was seen as something of a rising star in the party.

== Health Minister ==
In late 1987, amid mounting criticism from within the party, Sir Joh Bjelke-Petersen, Premier of Queensland for nearly twenty years, resigned, and was succeeded by the more moderate Mike Ahern. Ahern immediately instituted a ministerial reshuffle, removing the heavily criticised Yvonne Chapman, the state's first female Cabinet minister, but promoting Harvey to the high-profile position of Minister for Health. Harvey thus became the only woman in the Ahern Cabinet and the second woman in Queensland history to serve as a Cabinet minister.

Harvey's time as Health Minister, however, was plagued with difficulties from the beginning. She was forced to deal with a major health crisis which had sparked threats by hospital doctors to resign en masse, the Ward 10B scandal surrounding abuse of psychiatric patients at Townsville Hospital, and recurrent issues over the storage of toxic medical waste. She also came under attack for appointing her daughter and sister-in-law to her paid staff, as well as a woman previously convicted on fraud charges, and using government funds to pay her hairdressing bills, leading the opposition to dub her "Minister for Goldilocks". She had a difficult relationship with many in the medical profession; David Lindsay, former head of medicine at the Gold Coast Hospital, recounted in 2005 that Harvey "treated us like schoolchildren" and "told us about how precious her time was and how we were wasting her time". Harvey's caucus colleague Di McCauley, herself later a minister, remarked in her 2004 memoir Diving Off The Ironing Board that Harvey "seemed unable to cope from the beginning in what was the enormous and difficult portfolio of Health."

One of Harvey's major tasks as Health Minister was to deal with the government's response to the growing AIDS crisis. The issue had been essentially ignored under Bjelke-Petersen, but under the more moderate Ahern, Harvey was tasked with taking steps to begin to address the disease. To this extent, she oversaw the legalisation of condom vending machines and needle exchanges, and instituted a programme of AIDS education in schools. These steps were seen by some as inadequate, and her role was undermined by her poor relationship with the homosexual community. These issues came to a head in March 1988 when Harvey put out a departmental memo insisting that she be given unrestricted access to the medical records of AIDS patients, sparking a bitter battle over patient confidentiality, and repeated Opposition calls for her to be removed from the portfolio.

== Downfall ==
Rumours had been mounting throughout late 1988 that Harvey was likely to be either demoted or fired, and in January 1989, Ahern announced that Harvey would be demoted to the position of Minister for Family Services, ostensibly on the basis of having failed to seek his approval for employing a woman who had previously been jailed for fraud. An angry Harvey responded by threatening to resign and force a by-election. The government's poll numbers were in free fall by this time; by all accounts the Nationals would have almost certainly lost Greenslopes had Harvey resigned. This was not taken well by many of her National Party colleagues, and after an internal outcry, Ahern retracted his prior decision and sacked her from Cabinet altogether before she could be sworn in. Though she did not resign from Parliament as previously threatened, she became an ardent backbench opponent of Ahern, and strongly supported his more conservative rival, Russell Cooper, who toppled Ahern in a party-room coup later that year.

In the 1989 state election, the Nationals were swept from power in a massive Labor landslide. Harvey herself was resoundingly defeated by Labor challenger Gary Fenlon, suffering a 30% swing and finishing third behind both the Labor and Liberal candidates with only 11% of the vote. Three days later, as part of an investigation resulting from the findings of the Fitzgerald Inquiry into public corruption, she was one of five former National Party ministers to receive criminal summons by special prosecutor Doug Drummond, QC, on charges of misappropriating public funds. The charges concerned her use of her official credit card for A$42,364 in personal expenses, some of which it was alleged included taking her husband on a birthday trip to the Adelaide Grand Prix. She was subsequently convicted of misappropriation on 13 of the original 124 charges, concerning a total of $7,900, and sentenced to twelve months in prison in November 1990. The Court of Criminal Appeal later reduced the convictions to nine counts but did not reduce the sentence. In April 1991, the judge struck down a further 20 charges and released Harvey to serve the last seven months of her sentence in home detention. Harvey was due to face a retrial on the remaining 71 charges, but these charges were dropped in July 1991 by the Director of Public Prosecutions. She was released from prison in 1991, and has largely remained outside of public life in the years since.

== See also ==
- Don Lane (politician)
- Brian Austin

Parliament of Queensland
Preceded by Bill Hewitt	Member for Greenslopes; 1983–1989	Succeeded by Gary Fenlon
