= Electoral district of Miller =

State electoral district of Queensland, Australia

Miller Queensland—Legislative Assembly
- Map of the electoral district of Miller, 2017
- State: Queensland
- Dates current: 2017–present
- MP: Mark Bailey
- Party: Labor Party
- Namesake: Emma Miller
- Electors: 35,607 (2020)
- Area: 27 km^{2} (10.4 sq mi)
- Demographic: Inner-metropolitan
- Coordinates: 27.5295°S 153.0109°E
Electorates around Miller:
Maiwar	Maiwar	South Brisbane
Mount Ommaney	Miller	Greenslopes
Inala	Algester; Toohey	Mansfield

Miller is an electoral district of the Legislative Assembly in the Australian state of Queensland. It was created in the 2017 redistribution. It was named after Emma Miller, a labour and suffrage activist and is represented by Mark Bailey of the Labor Party.

Miller largely covers areas from the abolished district of Yeerongpilly. Located in southern Brisbane, Miller consists of the suburbs of Chelmer, Graceville, Sherwood, Tennyson, Yeerongpilly, Rocklea, Yeronga, Fairfield, Annerley, Tarragindi and Moorooka.

== Members for Miller ==
Member	Party	Term
Mark Bailey	Labor	2017–present

== Election results ==
2024 Queensland state election: Miller
Party	Candidate	Votes	%	±%
Labor	Mark Bailey	12,378	37.84	−4.15
Liberal National	Clio Padayachee	11,122	34.00	+3.43
Greens	Liam Flenady	7,706	23.56	+2.92
One Nation	Ashley Pettit	990	3.02	+1.10
Animal Justice	Carola Veloso-Busich	517	1.58	+1.58
Total formal votes		32,713	98.16	+0.06
Informal votes		612	1.84	−0.06
Turnout		33,325	91.51	+0.10
Two-party-preferred result
Labor	Mark Bailey	19,828	60.61	−3.21
Liberal National	Clio Padayachee	12,885	39.39	+3.21
Labor hold		Swing	−3.21	

== See also ==
- Electoral districts of Queensland
- Members of the Queensland Legislative Assembly by year
- Category:Members of the Queensland Legislative Assembly by name
