= Gary Fenlon =

Australian politician

Member of the Queensland Legislative Assembly for Greenslopes
- In office 2 December 1989 – 15 July 1995
- Preceded by: Leisha Harvey
- Succeeded by: Ted Radke
- In office 13 June 1998 – 20 March 2009
- Preceded by: Ted Radke
- Succeeded by: Cameron Dick

Parliamentary Secretary to the Minister for Transport, Trade, Employment and Industrial Relations
- In office 13 September 2007 – 20 March 2009
- Premier: Anna Bligh
- Preceded by: Michael Choi
- Succeeded by: Steve Minnikin (Assistant Minister for Public Transport)

Parliamentary Secretary to the Minister for State Development, Employment and Industrial Relations
- In office 21 September 2006 – 13 September 2007
- Premier: Peter Beattie
- Succeeded by: Michael Choi

Personal details
- Born: Gary Bernard Fenlon; 30 October 1954 (age 71) Rockhampton, Queensland, Australia
- Party: Labor
- Occupation: Teacher

Gary Bernard Fenlon (born 30 October 1954) is an Australian politician. He was a Labor member for the Legislative Assembly of Queensland from 1989 to 1995 and 1998 to 2009.

Born in Rockhampton, he was an industrial advocate and high school teacher before entering parliament. He served on Griffith University Council from 1990 to 1996.

At the 1989 Queensland state election, Fenlon was elected to parliament as the Labor member for Greenslopes. He held the seat for two terms before his loss to Liberal candidate Ted Radke at the 1995 state election. He recovered the seat by defeating Radke at the 1998 state election, holding the seat until his retirement in 2009.

Parliament of Queensland
Preceded by Leisha Harvey	Member for Greenslopes; 1989–1995	Succeeded by Ted Radke
Preceded by Ted Radke	Member for Greenslopes; 1998–2009	Succeeded by Cameron Dick
