= Dianne Reilly =

Australian politician

Member of the Queensland Legislative Assembly for Mudgeeraba
- In office 17 February 2001 – 21 March 2009
- Preceded by: New seat
- Succeeded by: Ros Bates

Personal details
- Born: 29 January 1969 (age 57) Brisbane, Queensland, Australia
- Party: Labor
- Education: University of Queensland
- Occupation: Public relations

Dianne Ann Reilly (born 29 January 1969) is an Australian politician. She was a Labor member of the Legislative Assembly of Queensland from 2001 to 2009, representing the district of Mudgeeraba.

Reilly was first elected to parliament at the 2001 state election and was subsequently re-elected at the 2004 state election and 2006 state election. Seeking a fourth term at the 2009 state election, she was defeated by Liberal National candidate Ros Bates.

Since her defeat in 2009, Reilly is employed by the Government owned and controlled Water Retailer Allconnex as a media and public relations advisor.

Reilly was born in Brisbane. She is married, with one son and one daughter.

Parliament of Queensland
Preceded by New seat	Member for Mudgeeraba; 2001–2009	Succeeded by Ros Bates
