= Bill Hewitt (politician) =

Australian politician

Member of the Queensland Legislative Assembly for Chatsworth
- In office 28 May 1966 – 12 November 1977
- Preceded by: Thomas Hiley
- Succeeded by: Terry Mackenroth

Member of the Queensland Legislative Assembly for Greenslopes
- In office 12 November 1977 – 22 October 1983
- Preceded by: Keith Hooper
- Succeeded by: Leisha Harvey

Personal details
- Born: William Douglas Hewitt; 31 October 1930 Mooloolaba, Queensland, Australia
- Died: 23 November 2016 (aged 86) Queensland
- Resting place: Mount Thompson crematorium
- Party: Liberal Party
- Spouse: Shirley Joan Clark (m.1956)
- Occupation: Business manager

William Douglas Hewitt (31 October 1930 – 23 November 2016) was an Australian politician. He was a Member of the Queensland Legislative Assembly.

== Early life ==
Bill Hewitt did not have a happy childhood. His father was a World War I veteran who often told his children how he had seen 6,000 men killed in a day, which Hewitt said made him a "rather serious child". After completing primary school, he initially worked in Carricks Furniture Factory, which he hoped would lead to an apprenticeship, but didn't. Later, he worked as an office boy at Castlemaine Perkins and the company paid for him to study accounting at night school, after which he became an office manager and a business manager.

== Politics ==
Hewitt joined the Liberal Party in 1950, becoming president of the Queensland Young Liberals.

He contested the newly seat of Belmont in the 1960 Queensland state election but was beaten by Labor's Fred Newton. He served as the campaign manager for Jim Killen who narrowly retained his federal seat of Moreton in the 1961 Australian federal election, enabling Robert Menzies' Liberal government to be re-elected with a majority of only two.

Hewitt was a Liberal member of the Legislative Assembly of Queensland from 28 May 1966 to 22 October 1983, representing the electorate of Chatsworth from 28 May 1966 to 12 November 1977 and Greenslopes from 12 November 1977 to 22 October 1983, when he was defeated by Leisha Harvey at the 1983 election.

In 1975, Hewitt did not support Joh Bjelke-Petersen's nomination of Albert Field to replace deceased federal Labor senator, Bertie Milliner, as this was against the wishes of the Labor Party. However, Field was appointed, triggering the 1975 Australian constitutional crisis leading to the dismissal of Australian Prime Minister Gough Whitlam.

From December 1980 to August 1983, Hewitt was the Minister for Environment, Survey and Valuation and Administrative Service in the Bjelke-Petersen government. After that, he became the Minister for Welfare Services.

On 18 August 1983, Hewitt together with fellow Liberal cabinet member Col Miller, resigned from the cabinet.

Hewitt was held in high regard by his fellow politicians from all parties for his integrity and even-handness, being described in his role of Chairman of Committee by his political opponent Kevin Hooper as "one of the fairest and most impartial chairmen".

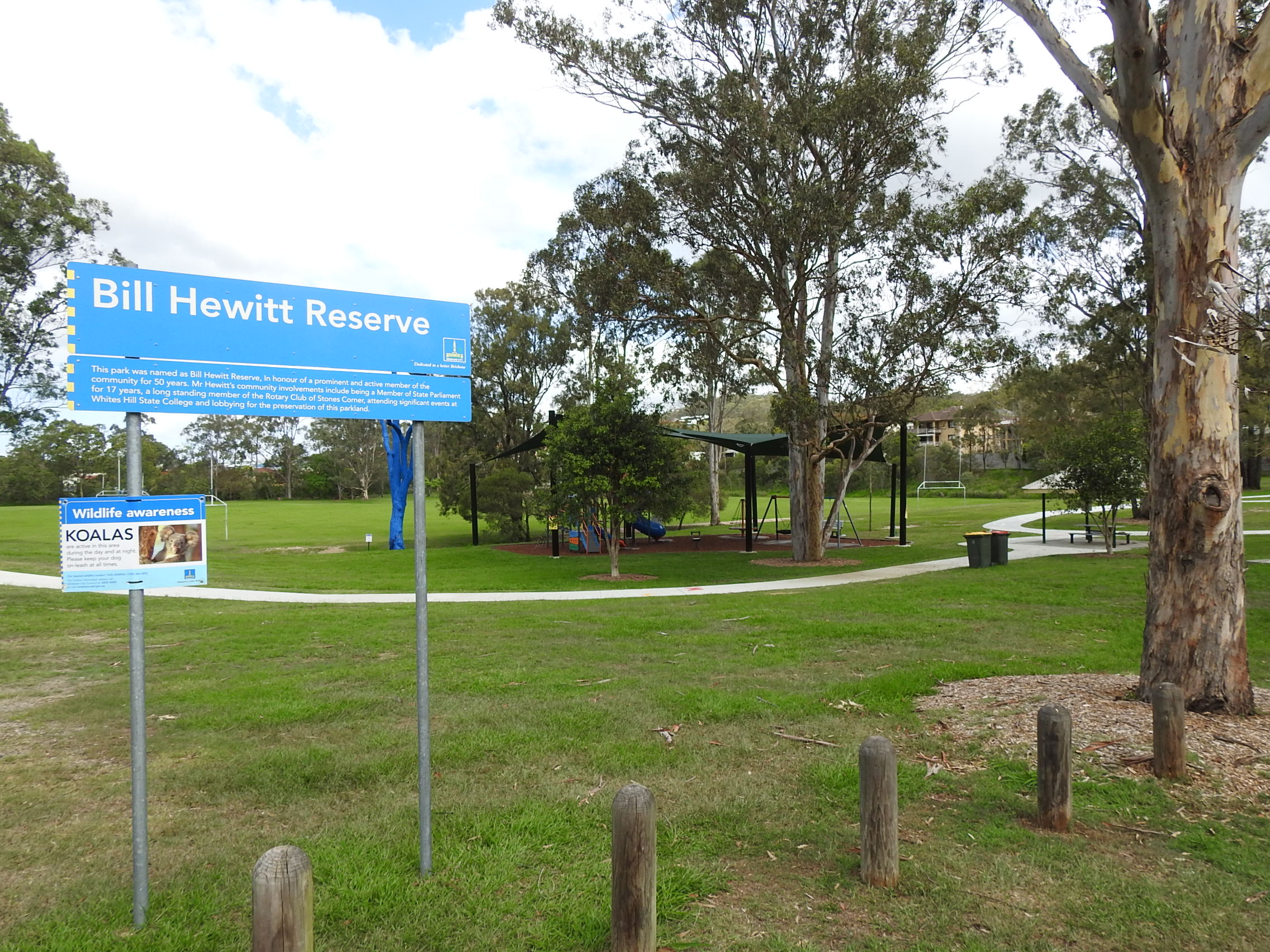
Bill Hewitt Reserve and sporting fields, Camp Hill, south Brisbane (2025)

== Later life ==
Hewitt died on 23 November 2016 at age 86. He was survived by his wife Shirley, children Wendy, David and Sue, and grandchildren Erin, Michael, Josh, Katie, Isaac, Nicholas and Thomas, and great grandchildren Marcus, Archer and Max. His funeral service and cremation were held at Mount Thompson crematorium on 30 November 2016.

A park reserve at Samuel Street, Camp Hill is named in 2016 for Hewitt.

Parliament of Queensland
Preceded by Thomas Hiley	Member for Chatsworth; 1966–1977	Succeeded by Terry Mackenroth
Preceded by Keith Hooper	Member for Greenslopes; 1977–1983	Succeeded by Leisha Harvey
