= Simon Finn (politician) =

Australian politician

Minister for Government Services, Building Industry and Information and Communication Technology of Queensland
- In office 21 February 2011 – 26 March 2012
- Preceded by: Robert Schwarten (Public Works and ICT)
- Succeeded by: Bruce Flegg (as Public Works); Ros Bates (Science, IT and Innovation)

Member of the Queensland Parliament for Yeerongpilly
- In office 7 February 2004 – 24 March 2012
- Preceded by: Matt Foley
- Succeeded by: Carl Judge

Personal details
- Party: Labor

Simon David Finn (born 5 December 1965) is a Labor Party politician who represented the seat of Yeerongpilly in the Legislative Assembly of Queensland from 7 February 2004 to 24 March 2012.

He was appointed as Minister for Government Services, Building Industry and Information and Communication Technology on 21 February 2011. He was also a member of the Parliamentary Criminal Misconduct Committee. Prior to his appointment as Minister for Government Services, Building Industry and Information and Communication Technology, he was Parliamentary Secretary for Industrial Relations.

Finn has been an advocate of preserving Brisbane heritage, including the historic Regent Theatre. He sponsored a petition for heritage listing of the venue which was tabled before the Queensland Legislative Assembly.
