= Ros Bates =

Australian politician

The Honourable Ros Bates MP
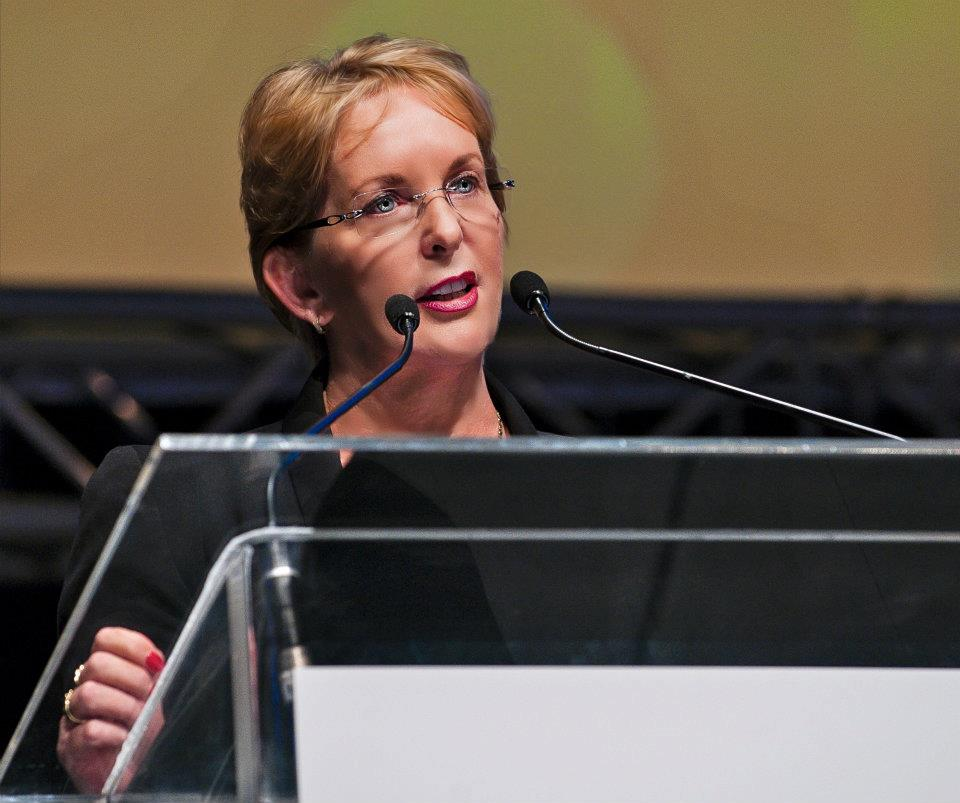

Minister for Finance and Trade
- Incumbent
- Assumed office 1 November 2024
- Premier: David Crisafulli
- Preceded by: Di Farmer

Minister for Employment and Training
- Incumbent
- Assumed office 1 November 2024
- Premier: David Crisafulli
- Preceded by: Lance McCallum (as Minister for Employment and Small Business Minister for Training and Skills Development)

Shadow Minister for Employment and Training
- In office 15 December 2017 – 28 October 2024
- Leader: David Crisafulli
- Preceded by: Lance McCallum
- Succeeded by: Michael Healy (as Shadow Minister for Jobs and Training)

Shadow Minister for Health and Ambulance Services
- In office 15 December 2017 – 28 October 2024
- Leader: Deb Frecklington; David Crisafulli
- Preceded by: John-Paul Langbroek
- Succeeded by: Mark Bailey

Shadow Minister for Women
- In office 26 May 2016 – 28 October 2024
- Leader: Tim Nicholls; Deb Frecklington; David Crisafulli
- Succeeded by: Shannon Fentiman

Shadow Minister for Communities, Child Safety, Disability Services and the Prevention of Family and Domestic Violence
- In office 6 May 2016 – 15 December 2017
- Leader: Tim Nicholls
- Preceded by: Tracy Davis
- Succeeded by: Christian Rowan (as Shadow Minister for Communities and Disability Services); Stephen Bennett (as Shadow Minister for Child Safety and the Prevention of Family and Domestic Violence)

Minister for Science, Information Technology, Innovation and the Arts of Queensland
- In office 3 April 2012 – 15 February 2013
- Premier: Campbell Newman
- Preceded by: Simon Finn
- Succeeded by: Ian Walker

Shadow Minister for Government Services, Building Industry, Information and Communication Technology
- In office 11 April 2011 – 19 February 2012
- Leader: Campbell Newman
- Preceded by: Scott Emerson
- Succeeded by: Bill Byrne

Member of the Queensland Parliament for Mudgeeraba
- Incumbent
- Assumed office 21 March 2009
- Preceded by: Dianne Reilly

Personal details
- Born: Rosslyn Mary Bates; 25 May 1962 (age 64) Healesville, Victoria
- Party: Liberal National Party
- Profession: Businesswoman
- Website: rosbates.com.au/

Rosslyn Mary Bates (born 25 May 1962) is an Australian politician. Bates has been a Liberal National Party member of the Parliament of Queensland since March 2009, representing the electorate of Mudgeeraba.

== Early career ==
Prior to entering politics, Bates spent 29 years in the health profession. Starting her career as a nurse in both the public and private sector, she became the general manager and director of nursing at the Wesley Gold Coast Hospital.

Bates was awarded the Prime Minister's Centenary of Federation Medal (2001) and the Telstra Business Woman of the Year (AusIndustry category) in 2000.

== Political career ==
In April 2012, Bates was appointed the Minister for Science, Information Technology, Innovation and the Arts as part of Campbell Newman's first Cabinet.

After a series of health issues including a serious shoulder infection and sustaining fractured vertebrae, Bates resigned as Minister on 15 February 2013

== Member for Mudgeeraba ==
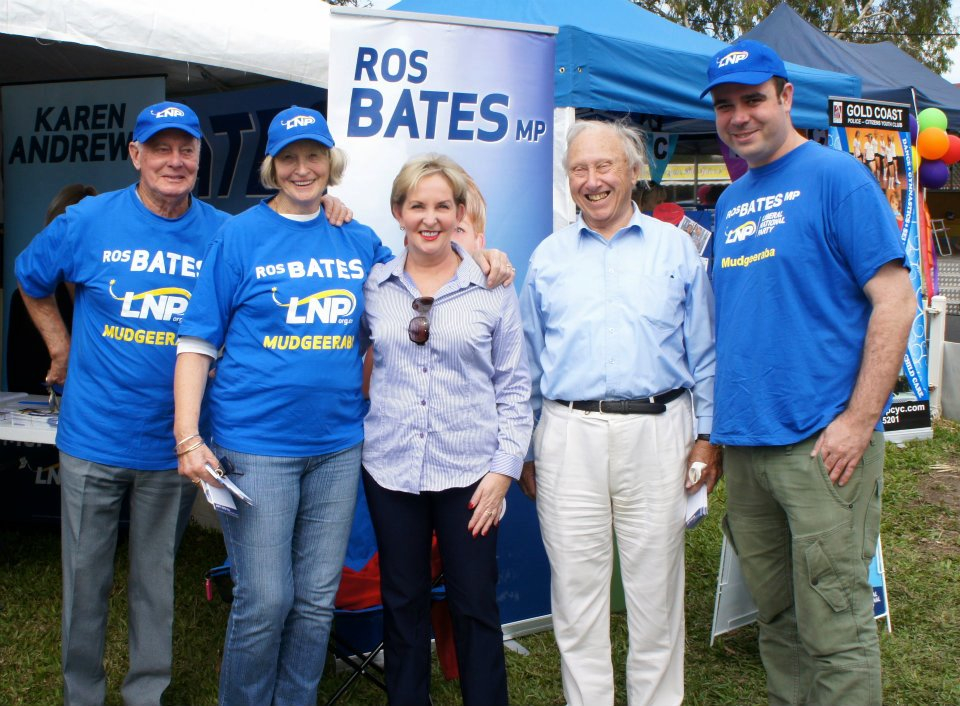
Bates with supporters at the 2012 Mudgeeraba Show.

Bates was first elected as the Member for Mudgeeraba in March 2009 after defeating the incumbent Labor Member Dianne Reilly. Bates was re-elected in March 2012 with an increased majority.

As the incoming Member for Mudgeeraba, Bates said she would fight to ensure the Southport Hospital was retained as an operational facility when the new University Hospital opens at Parklands in 2012. Bates campaigns on popular issues, saying "issues such as the overhead power lines in Reedy Creek, the Elysium Road overpass and stopping that closure, [are] all very resounding issues in the electorate."

Bates first stood as the Liberal candidate for the seat in 2006 but was defeated.

== Controversies ==
In 2012, Ros Bates' son, Ben Gommers, was at the centre of a scandal accusing him of being improperly appointed to a high paying public servant position. The media questioned the relationship between Ms Bates and the relevant minister under whom her son was employed.

Questions were referred to Ms Bates regarding this relationship and what, if any, influence she had regarding her appointment, however it was later revealed that she did not have any input into the appointment of her son. This included perks such as a car park being awarded to her son whose position traditionally doesn't receive an inner city car park. It was also revealed that her son had worked previously in similar positions in NSW and Victoria under Liberal and Labor Governments.

As the Minister for Information Technology it was reported Bates attended a dinner with several lobbyist firms that was excluded from her official contact register. Tabled documents from the Integrity Commissioner exonerated Bates in relation to this matter as the function was in her capacity as a Minister.

It was later revealed that Bates had attended a dinner with several lobbyist firms and failed to report this and it was also excluded from her official contact register. This led to calls for her removal as minister. Bates announced her resignation from the Cabinet on 15 February 2013 citing health and family reasons. Previously, Bates had undergone intensive high dose antibiotic therapy through a catheter threaded directly into her heart for six weeks due to a shoulder infection.

In June 2013, Bates was accused of misleading parliament and breaching the national health practitioner law by falsely claiming to be a registered nurse despite allowing her registration to lapse, despite previously being a registered nurse for 30 years. AHPRA, the body overseeing the national health practitioner laws concluded that Bates did not intend to provide misleading information and consider the matter to be closed. AHPRA placed conditions on Bate's registration as a nurse restricting her from having direct contact with any patients stating "The practitioner will not undertake any roles requiring direct or indirect clinical patient contact unless approval to do so by the board or its delegate."

On 19 October 2013, the Queensland Parliament's ethics committee concluded that Bates did not intend to deliberately mislead the Parliament."

In May 2024, Bates yelled 'cross your legs' during question time discourse from the Queensland minister for health and women, Shannon Fentiman. Fentiman was discussing pregnant women in labour being turned away from Queensland hospitals.

Parliament of Queensland
Preceded by Dianne Reilly	Member for Mudgeeraba; 2009–present	Incumbent
