= Matt Foley (politician) =

Australian politician

The Hon Matt Foley

Minister for Employment and Training of Queensland
- In office 22 February 2001 – 12 February 2004
- Premier: Peter Beattie
- Preceded by: Paul Braddy
- Succeeded by: Tom Barton
- In office 24 September 1992 – 31 July 1995
- Premier: Wayne Goss
- Preceded by: Ken Vaughan
- Succeeded by: Wendy Edmond

Attorney-General of Queensland and Minister for Justice
- In office 29 June 1998 – 22 February 2001
- Premier: Peter Beattie
- Preceded by: Denver Beanland
- Succeeded by: Rod Welford
- In office 31 July 1995 – 19 February 1996
- Premier: Wayne Goss
- Preceded by: Dean Wells
- Succeeded by: Denver Beanland

Shadow Attorney-General Shadow Minister for Justice
- In office 22 February 1996 – 26 June 1998
- Leader: Peter Beattie
- Preceded by: Denver Beanland
- Succeeded by: Lawrence Springborg

Minister for Industrial Relations of Queensland
- In office 24 September 1992 – 19 February 1996
- Premier: Wayne Goss
- Preceded by: Ken Vaughan
- Succeeded by: Santo Santoro

Member of the Queensland Legislative Assembly for Yeerongpilly Yeronga (1989–2001)
- In office 2 December 1989 – 7 February 2004
- Preceded by: Norm Lee
- Succeeded by: Simon Finn

Personal details
- Born: Matthew Joseph Foley; 24 January 1951 (age 75) Brisbane, Queensland, Australia
- Party: Labor Party
- Children: 2 sons, 4 stepchildren
- Education: University of Queensland
- Occupation: Solicitor, Social worker

The Hon. Matthew Joseph Foley (born 24 January 1951) is a former Australian politician.

== Early life ==
Before entering politics, Foley was a barrister and social worker, and sub-dean of the Social Work Faculty at Queensland University 1981–1983. Foley was chairperson of the Social Security Appeals Tribunal (1983–1986), president of the Queensland Council for Civil Liberties (1985–1987), a member of the Criminal Law Sub-Committee of the Bar Association of Queensland and of the National Consumer Affairs Advisory Council (1988–1989) and National President of the Labor Lawyers Association (1989).

== Political career ==
In 1989, Foley was elected to the Legislative Assembly of Queensland as the Labor member for Yeronga. From 1992 onward, Foley served as Attorney-General of Queensland and Minister for the Arts, among other roles, in the Wayne Goss Government.

In opposition from 1996 to 1998, Foley was Shadow Attorney-General.

When Labor won government under Peter Beattie in 1998, Foley was appointed Minister for the Arts, Attorney-General and Minister for Justice. At the 2001 election, his seat was abolished and he successfully contested Yeerongpilly. Judge Roslyn Atkinson has credited Foley, in his role as Queensland Attorney-General, with making the Bench more inclusive and representative of wider society, and specifically appointing more women to the Bench. After the election, he became Minister for Employment, Training and Youth, keeping his responsibility for the Arts but leaving his legal portfolios.

Foley retired from politics in 2004.

Parliament of Queensland
Preceded by Norm Lee	Member for Yeronga; 1989–2001	Abolished
New seat	Member for Yeerongpilly; 2001–2004	Succeeded by Simon Finn
