= Electoral district of Yeerongpilly =

Former state electorate in Queensland, Australia

Yeerongpilly Queensland—Legislative Assembly
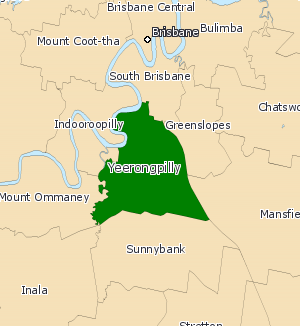
- Yeerongpilly (2008–2017)
- State: Queensland
- Dates current: 2001–2017
- Namesake: Yeerongpilly
- Electors: 33,724 (2015)
- Area: 36 km^{2} (13.9 sq mi)
- Coordinates: 27°32′S 153°2′E

Yeerongpilly was a Legislative Assembly electorate the state of Queensland. Named for the suburb with the same name, the electorate was renamed before the 2001 elections from the previous name of Yeronga. In 2017, it was abolished and replaced by the electoral district of Miller.

== Geography ==
Yeerongpilly was bordered by the Brisbane River and Oxley Creek to the north and west, while the electoral districts of Greenslopes, Mansfield, South Brisbane and Sunnybank bordered it on the east and south. The division included suburbs in Brisbane's inner south, including Annerley, Fairfield, Moorooka, Nathan, Rocklea, Salisbury, Tarragindi, Yeronga and Yeerongpilly. Many landmarks, including the Nathan campus of Griffith University and the Queensland Sport and Athletics Centre fell in the electorate.

== Demographics ==
As redistributions alter an electorate's area and demographic profile, the 2006 Census by the Australian Bureau of Statistics was the main source of information relating to the electorate. At the time of the 2006 census, the median age was thirty-five, as opposed to the state average of thirty-six. 69.5% of residents were born in Australia, below the state average of 75.2%. The percentage of Catholicism and Irreligion followers is in line with state averages, yet Anglicanism is somewhat less. At 27.4%, the percentage of professionals as an occupation was considerably higher than both the state average, 17.1%, and the national average, 19.8%. The percentage of labourers and managers, however, were lower than the national averages. The median income of the district is similar to the rest of the nation. The suburb of Yeerongpilly is noted for its large Asian population, and the district's Sudanese-born population was twelve times the national average.

== History ==
The electorate of Yeronga was formed in 1950, with the Liberal Party's Winston Noble holding the seat for fourteen years. Norman Lee, also of the Liberal party, then held the seat until 1989. Matt Foley of the Labor party then won the seat. In 2001, the seat was renamed to Yeerongpilly. At the 2004 state election, Foley chose not to run for the seat again, with Simon Finn taking his place in the seat. In the 2006 redistribution, the suburbs of Archerfield, Coopers Plains and Tennyson were lost, yet the suburbs of Fairfield, Tarragindi and Wellers Hill were gained. In 2017, Yeerongpilly was abolished and replaced by the electoral district of Miller.

== Members for Yeerongpilly ==
Member	Party	Term
Matt Foley	Labor	2001–2004
Simon Finn	Labor	2004–2012
Carl Judge	Liberal National	2012
Carl Judge	Independent	2012–2013
Carl Judge	Palmer United	2013–2014
Carl Judge	Independent	2014–2015
Mark Bailey	Labor	2015–2017
