= Carl Judge =

Australian politician

Leader of the Palmer United Party in Queensland
- In office 11 August 2014 – 8 October 2014
- Deputy: John Bjelke-Petersen
- Preceded by: Alex Douglas
- Succeeded by: John Bjelke-Petersen

Member of the Queensland Parliament for Yeerongpilly
- In office 24 March 2012 – 31 January 2015
- Preceded by: Simon Finn
- Succeeded by: Mark Bailey

Personal details
- Born: 14 June 1968 (age 58) Rockhampton, Queensland
- Party: Independent (2012–2013; 2014–present)
- Other political affiliations: Liberal National (until 2012); Palmer United (2013–2014)
- Occupation: Policy advisor (Department of Education and Training); Police officer (Queensland Police)
- Profession: Public servant Politician

Carl John Judge (born 14 June 1968) is an Australian politician. He served as a member of the Queensland Legislative Assembly from 2012 to 2015. He was elected as a member of the Liberal National Party, but quit the party to sit as an independent on 29 November 2012. He then joined the new United Australia Party (UAP) on 30 April 2013. The UAP was subsequently rebranded as the Palmer United Party and Judge later became an independent again on 8 October 2014.

== Political career ==
Judge defeated Simon Finn at the 2012 state election and is the first Liberal/Liberal National Party member to hold the seat, formerly called Yeronga, since 1989. Judge was appointed to the Queensland Parliament's Member, Legal Affairs and Community Safety Committee on 18 May 2012. He also served as a member of the Transport, Housing and Local Government Committee and was appointed to the Select Committee on Ethics.

Parliament of Queensland
| Preceded by Simon Finn | Member for Yeerongpilly; 2012–2015 | Succeeded by Mark Bailey |
