= Ian Kaye =

Australian politician (born 1969)

Member of the Queensland Parliament for Greenslopes
- In office 24 March 2012 – 31 January 2015
- Preceded by: Cameron Dick
- Succeeded by: Joe Kelly

Personal details
- Born: 19 August 1969 (age 56)
- Party: Liberal National
- Profession: Police officer

Ian Scott Kaye (born 19 August 1969) is an Australian politician who served as the member of the Legislative Assembly of Queensland for Greenslopes from 2012 to 2015. He is a member of the Liberal National Party.

Parliament of Queensland
Preceded by Cameron Dick	Member for Greenslopes; 2012–2015	Succeeded by Joe Kelly
