= Electoral district of Mudgeeraba =

State electoral district of Queensland, Australia

Mudgeeraba Queensland—Legislative Assembly
- Electoral map of Mudgeeraba 2017
- State: Queensland
- Dates current: 2001–present
- MP: Ros Bates
- Party: Liberal National
- Namesake: Mudgeeraba
- Electors: 38,319 (2020)
- Area: 402 km^{2} (155.2 sq mi)
- Demographic: Outer-metropolitan
- Coordinates: 28°7′S 153°18′E
Electorates around Mudgeeraba:
Theodore	Gaven	Surfers Paradise
Scenic Rim	Mudgeeraba	Mermaid Beach; Burleigh
Scenic Rim	New South Wales	Currumbin

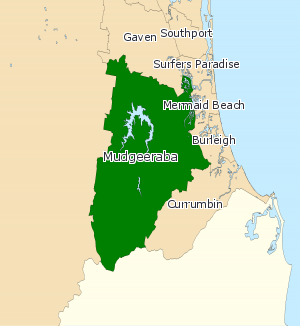
Electoral map of Mudgeeraba 2008

Mudgeeraba is an electoral district of the Legislative Assembly in the Australian state of Queensland. Based on the Gold Coast, the district has been held by both sides of politics over the course of its short history.

The electorate covers the western suburbs and hinterland of the Gold Coast. It was created out of the southern half of the former district of Nerang by the 2001 redistribution.

Dianne Reilly of the Labor Party, the seat's inaugural member, held the seat for three terms until her defeat to Ros Bates of the Liberal National Party at the 2009 state election.

== Members for Mudgeeraba ==
Member	Party	Term
Dianne Reilly	Labor	2001–2009
Ros Bates	Liberal National	2009–present

== Election results ==
2024 Queensland state election: Mudgeeraba
Party	Candidate	Votes	%	±%
Liberal National	Ros Bates	17,842	51.69	+2.69
Labor	Sophie Lynch	8,711	25.23	−1.27
One Nation	Carl Mocnik	3,545	10.27	+2.57
Greens	Scott Turner	3,261	9.45	+0.55
Family First	Samuel Buckley	1,161	3.36	+3.36
Total formal votes		34,520	95.57	
Informal votes		1,601	4.43	
Turnout		36,121	87.79	
Two-party-preferred result
Liberal National	Ros Bates	22,053	63.88	+3.78
Labor	Sophie Lynch	12,467	36.12	−3.78
Liberal National hold		Swing	+3.78	

Primary vote results in Mudgeeraba (Parties that have never gotten 5% of the vote are omitted)
Liberal/Liberal National
Labor
Greens
Family First
One Nation
Palmer United/United Australia Party
Katter's Australian
Independent
View source data.
Two-party-preferred vote vote results in Mudgeeraba View source data.
