= Joe Kelly (Queensland politician) =

Australian politician (born 1970)

Joe Kelly MP

Speaker of the Queensland Legislative Assembly
- Acting
- In office 16 May 2023 – 12 September 2023
- Deputy Speaker: Cynthia Lui (acting)
- Preceded by: Curtis Pitt
- Succeeded by: Curtis Pitt

Member of the Queensland Legislative Assembly for Greenslopes
- Incumbent
- Assumed office 31 January 2015
- Preceded by: Ian Kaye

Personal details
- Born: 1 March 1970 (age 56) Brisbane, Queensland, Australia
- Party: Labor
- Website: www.joekellymp.com.au

Joseph Patrick Kelly (born 1 March 1970) is an Australian politician. He attended Ignatius Park College in Townsville, North Queensland. He has been the Labor member for Greenslopes in the Queensland Legislative Assembly since 2015.

Joe Kelly is a registered nurse having completed his training at the Royal Brisbane Hospital. He is also a member of the Australasian Rehabilitation Nurses' Association. Immediately prior to his election to the Queensland Parliament, Joe was employed as a clinical nurse at Queen Elizabeth II Jubilee Hospital, working in the area of rehabilitation.

He has attained the qualifications Certificate of Nursing (RN), Advanced Diploma of Business (ADipBus), Graduate Certificate of Health Economics (GradCertHealthEcon).

On 29 November 2016, Joe Kelly was elected as a member of the Parliamentary Crime and Corruption Committee, and on 14 February 2017 he was elected to Chair of the Queensland Parliament Agriculture and Environment Committee. He has previous served as a member of the Health, Communities, Disability Services and Domestic Family Violence Prevention Committee, and Health and Ambulance Services Committee.

Parliament of Queensland
Preceded by Ian Kaye	Member for Greenslopes; 2015–present	Incumbent
