= Electoral district of Greenslopes =

State electoral district of Queensland, Australia

Greenslopes Queensland—Legislative Assembly
- Electoral map of Greenslopes 2017
- State: Queensland
- Dates current: 1960–present
- MP: Joe Kelly
- Party: Labor Party
- Namesake: Greenslopes
- Electors: 37,368 (2020)
- Area: 18 km^{2} (6.9 sq mi)
- Demographic: Inner-metropolitan
- Coordinates: 27°31′S 153°4′E
Electorates around Greenslopes:
| South Brisbane | Bulimba | Bulimba |
| Miller | Greenslopes | Chatsworth |
| Toohey | Mansfield | Mansfield |

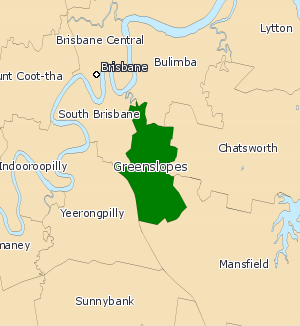
Greenslopes electoral map 2008

Greenslopes is an electoral district of the Legislative Assembly in the Australian state of Queensland.

The electorate is centred on the Brisbane suburb of Greenslopes and stretches north to parts of Norman Park and as far south as Mount Gravatt. Greenslopes was created at the 1959 electoral redistribution from the electorates of Buranda and Bulimba. It was held by the Liberal Party from 1960 to 1983, when it was won by Leisha Harvey for the National Party following the collapse of the National-Liberal coalition in Queensland.

== Members for Greenslopes ==
| Member | Party | Term |
|---|---|---|
| Keith Hooper | Liberal | 1960–1977 |
| Bill Hewitt | Liberal | 1977–1983 |
| Leisha Harvey | National | 1983–1989 |
| Gary Fenlon | Labor | 1989–1995 |
| Ted Radke | Liberal | 1995–1998 |
| Gary Fenlon | Labor | 1998–2009 |
| Cameron Dick | Labor | 2009–2012 |
| Ian Kaye | Liberal National | 2012–2015 |
| Joe Kelly | Labor | 2015–present |

== Election results ==
2024 Queensland state election: Greenslopes
| Party | Candidate | Votes | % | ±% |
|---|---|---|---|---|
| Labor | Joe Kelly | 12,205 | 35.55 | −5.75 |
| Liberal National | Andrew Newbold | 11,711 | 34.11 | +2.61 |
| Greens | Rebecca White | 9,049 | 26.35 | +2.85 |
| One Nation | Hugh Dickson | 932 | 2.71 | +0.21 |
| Family First | Karine Davis | 438 | 1.28 | +1.28 |
| Total formal votes | | 34,335 | 97.81 | −0.26 |
| Informal votes | | 767 | 2.19 | +0.26 |
| Turnout | | 35,120 | 90.60 | +1.97 |
Two-party-preferred result
| Labor | Joe Kelly | 20,534 | 59.80 | −3.40 |
| Liberal National | Andrew Newbold | 13,801 | 40.20 | +3.40 |
| Labor hold | | Swing | −3.40 | |
