= Mark Bailey (politician) =

Australian politician

The Honourable Mark Bailey MP
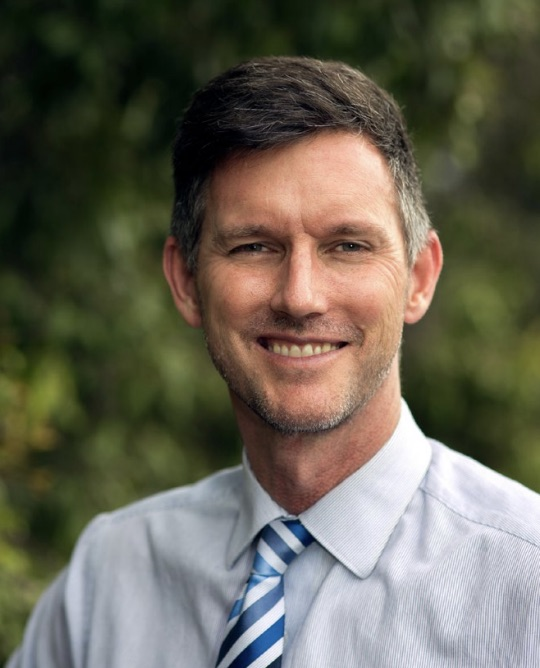
- Bailey circa 2022

Minister for Transport of Queensland
- In office 12 December 2017 – 17 December 2023
- Premier: Annastacia Palaszczuk
- Preceded by: Jackie Trad
- Succeeded by: Bart Mellish

Minister for Main Roads of Queensland
- In office 16 February 2015 – 17 December 2023
- Premier: Annastacia Palaszczuk
- Preceded by: Scott Emerson
- Succeeded by: Bart Mellish

Minister for Energy, Biofuels and Water Supply of Queensland
- In office 16 February 2015 – 11 December 2017
- Premier: Annastacia Palaszczuk
- Preceded by: Mark McArdle
- Succeeded by: Anthony Lynham

Minister for Road Safety and Ports of Queensland
- In office 16 February 2015 – 11 December 2017
- Premier: Annastacia Palaszczuk
- Preceded by: New portfolio
- Succeeded by: Position abolished

Member of the Queensland Legislative Assembly for Miller Yeerongpilly (2015–2017)
- Incumbent
- Assumed office 31 January 2015
- Preceded by: Carl Judge

Brisbane City Councillor for Moorooka Ward
- In office 2 March 1994 – 4 June 2003
- Succeeded by: Steve Griffiths

Personal details
- Born: Gold Coast, Queensland
- Party: Labor
- Education: University of Queensland
- Website: www.markbaileymp.au

Mark Craig Bailey is an Australian politician who has been the Labor member for Miller (formerly Yeerongpilly) in the Queensland Legislative Assembly since 2017 and was the Member for Yeerongpilly from January 2015 until November 2017. Bailey most recently served as the Minister for Transport and Main Roads of Queensland until 17 December 2023. He has also worked in gambling, liquor and racing policy for the Queensland state government.

== Early life ==
Bailey was born on the Gold Coast, Queensland, Australia and completed a Bachelor of Arts degree at the University of Queensland. He has a degree in high school teaching in history and drama from Griffith University and is a graduate in acting from the Neighborhood Playhouse School of the Theatre in New York City.

== Political career ==
=== Local government ===
During the Soorley Administration, Bailey was elected to the Brisbane City Council in 1994 and represented the ward of Moorooka until 2003.

=== Member of Parliament ===
At the 2015 Queensland state election, Bailey won the seat of Yeerongpilly from the LNP with a 14.7% swing, making it a safe Labor seat. He was sworn in as Minister for Main Roads, Road Safety and Ports and Minister for Energy and Water Supply in the Palaszczuk Ministry on 16 February 2015. On 8 December 2015, Biofuels was added to his portfolio.

Ahead of the 2017 Queensland state election, Yeerongpilly was abolished and replaced with the new marginal seat of Miller, which Bailey won with a 2.6% swing. After the election, he was appointed as Minister for Transport and Main Roads, taking over from Jackie Trad In July 2017, Bailey stood aside from his ministerial responsibilities following an investigation by the Crime and Corruption Commission into his use of a personal email account to conduct parliamentary business and his subsequent attempts to delete emails possibly relating to his role as a member of parliament – the so-called "mangocube scandal". The commission concluded that Bailey had not engaged in any corrupt conduct and declined to pursue charges against him. He resumed his ministerial duties in September 2017.

At the 2020 Queensland state election, Bailey increased his margin to 13.8%, making Miller a safe Labor seat for the first time.

In December 2023, after Annastacia Palaszczuk unexpectedly resigned as premier in the lead-up to the 2023 Queensland Labor Party leadership election, Bailey announced his own resignation from cabinet effective from 17 December. Bailey continued as the member for Miller and stated that "I look forward to having more time to work hard for my Miller constituents as their local MP" and he would also recontest the seat of Miller at the October 2024 state election.

== Personal life ==
In May 2018, Bailey and fellow MP Meaghan Scanlon confirmed that they had been in a relationship since 2016. They announced the end of their relationship in February 2026.

== See also ==
- First Palaszczuk Ministry
- Second Palaszczuk Ministry
- Third Palaszczuk Ministry

Parliament of Queensland
Preceded by Carl Judge	Member for Yeerongpilly; 2015–2017	Abolished
New seat	Member for Miller; 2017–present	Incumbent
Political offices
Preceded by Mark McArdle	Minister for Main Roads, Road Safety and Ports and Minister for Energy and Water Supply; 2015–2023	Succeeded by himself
New title	Minister for Main Roads, Road Safety and Ports and Minister for Energy, Biofuels and Water Supply; 2015–2017	Succeeded by Anthony Lynham (Minister for Energy) himself (Minister for Main Roads)
Preceded by Jackie Trad	Minister for Transport and Main Roads; 2017–2023	Succeeded by Bart Mellish
