= Candidates of the 1995 Queensland state election =

The 1995 Queensland state election was held on 15 July 1995.

== By-elections ==
- On 30 April 1994, Ted Malone (National) was elected to succeed Jim Randell (National), who had resigned on 31 March 1994, as the member for Mirani.

== Retiring Members ==
=== Labor ===
- Ed Casey (Mackay)
- Pat Comben (Kedron)
- Ken Vaughan (Nudgee)
- Anne Warner (South Brisbane)

== Legislative Assembly ==
Sitting members are shown in bold text.

Electorate	Held by	Labor candidate	Coalition candidate	Greens candidate	Democrats candidate	Other candidates
Albert	Labor	**John Szczerbanik**	Bill Baumann (Nat)	Bill Heck	Sharron Lucht	John O'Connor (Ind)
Archerfield	Labor	**Len Ardill**	Adam Low (Lib)			
Ashgrove	Labor	**Jim Fouras**	Peter Rowell (Lib)		Leo Talty	Roger Brand (Ind); Ray Sargent (Ind)
Aspley	Liberal	Madonna Jarrett	**John Goss** (Lib)		Tanya Price	Jeff Gehrmann (Ind)
Barambah	National	Scott Zackerson	**Trevor Perrett** (Nat)			Neville Reimers (CAP)
Barron River	Labor	**Lesley Clark**	Ron Crew (Nat); Lyn Warwick* (Lib)	Chris Nielsen	Leonie Watson	Steve Dimitriou (Ind); Brian Hoffman (Ind)
Beaudesert	National	Pat Taylor	**Kev Lingard** (Nat)		Arthur Hickman	
Brisbane Central	Labor	**Peter Beattie**	Jason Aldworth (Lib)	Richard Nielsen		Zanny Begg (Ind); Guy McGhie (Ind)
Broadwater	National	Bob Brown	**Allan Grice** (Nat)			
Bulimba	Labor	**Pat Purcell**	Toni Drewett (Lib)	Barry Wilson		
Bundaberg	Labor	**Clem Campbell**	Kay McDuff (Nat)			
Bundamba	Labor	**Bob Gibbs**	Yale Stephens (Lib)			John Ranizowski (Ind)
Burdekin	National	Jenny Hill	**Mark Stoneman** (Nat)			Alex Caldwell (Ind)
Burleigh	National	Mark Whillans	**Judy Gamin** (Nat)		Melinda Norman-Hicks	
Burnett	National	Barbara Woods	**Doug Slack** (Nat)			
Caboolture	Labor	**Jon Sullivan**	Bill Newton (Nat)	John Lamb	Marilyn Drewett	
Cairns	Labor	**Keith De Lacy**	Myles Thompson (Lib)	Pat Daly	Raymond Broomhall	
Callide	National	Katrina McGill	**Di McCauley** (Nat)			Anthony May (CAP)
Caloundra	Liberal	Donald Wilson	**Joan Sheldon** (Lib)		Michael Reckenberg	Bob Doring (Ind)
Capalaba	Labor	**Jim Elder**	Margaret Uhr (Lib)			
Charters Towers	National	John White	**Rob Mitchell** (Nat)		Kevin Paine	Jo Cronin (Ind)
Chatsworth	Labor	**Terry Mackenroth**	Bruce Martin (Lib)			Peter Ousby (CAP)
Chermside	Labor	**Terry Sullivan**	Zenia Belcher (Lib)			Matthew Low (Ind)
Clayfield	Liberal	Dennis Williams	**Santo Santoro** (Lib)		James Leddy	
Cleveland	Labor	**Darryl Briskey**	Peter Turnbull (Lib)		Janice Potter	
Cook	Labor	**Steve Bredhauer**	Terry Cranwell (Nat)		Trevor Tim	Edgar Williams (Ind)
Crows Nest	National	John Martin	**Russell Cooper** (Nat)	Robert Rowston		
Cunningham	National	Joe Felice	**Tony Elliott** (Nat)			
Currumbin	Labor	**Merri Rose**	Kerrin Woods (Lib)	Anja Light		Kevin Goodwin (Ind)
Everton	Labor	**Rod Welford**	Judy Robertson (Lib)			
Ferny Grove	Labor	**Glen Milliner**	Reuben Morris (Lib)	Mark Taylor		Brett Gorman (Ind)
Fitzroy	Labor	**Jim Pearce**	Karen Mackay (Nat)			
Gladstone	Labor	**Neil Bennett**	Jenny Elliot (Nat)	Cedric Williams		Liz Cunningham (Ind)
Greenslopes	Labor	**Gary Fenlon**	Ted Radke (Lib)			
Gregory	National	Jamie Lonsdale	**Vaughan Johnson** (Nat)			
Gympie	National	David Warren	**Len Stephan** (Nat)		Peter Sykes	Inge Schilling (Ind)
Hervey Bay	Labor	**Bill Nunn**	Tony Nioa (Nat)		Kathy Shilvock	
Hinchinbrook	National	Diana O'Brien	**Marc Rowell** (Nat)		John Preece	
Inala	Labor	**Henry Palaszczuk**	Andrew Rowland (Lib)			
Indooroopilly	Liberal	Teresa Farruggio	**Denver Beanland** (Lib)	Willy Bach	Simon Price	
Ipswich	Labor	**David Hamill**	Steve Wilson (Lib)	Desiree Mahoney		Bill Yabsley (Ind)
Ipswich West	Labor	**Don Livingstone**	Jack Else (Nat)			Paul Vaughan (Ind)
Kallangur	Labor	**Ken Hayward**	Scott Driscoll (Lib)	Craig Josey		Rona Joyner (Ind)
Kedron	Labor	**Paul Braddy**	Richard Schellbach (Lib)			
Keppel	National	Bruce Saunders	**Vince Lester** (Nat)	Bob Muir		
Kurwongbah	Labor	**Margaret Woodgate**	Dennis Sharkey (Lib)	Kim Pantano		Rob Akers (Ind); Paul Hunter (CAP)
Lockyer	National	Lance McCallum	**Tony Fitzgerald** (Nat)			Pat Andrew (CAP)
Logan	Labor	**Wayne Goss**	Gordon Ritter (Lib)			
Lytton	Labor	**Tom Burns**	Jenny Mansell (Lib)	Bert Nord		
Mackay	Labor	Tim Mulherin	Bruce Avenell (Nat)			Peter Barbour (CAP)
Mansfield	Labor	**Laurel Power**	Frank Carroll (Lib)	Lorrelle Saunders		
Maroochydore	National	Ken King	**Fiona Simpson** (Nat)	Susie Chapman		
Maryborough	Labor	**Bob Dollin**	Lloyd Maddern (Nat)		Pamela Howard	
Merrimac	Liberal	Matthew Loader	**Bob Quinn** (Lib)			
Mirani	National	Barry Gomersall	**Ted Malone** (Nat)			Ronnie Bell (Ind)
Moggill	Liberal	Laurie Lumsden	**David Watson** (Lib)			
Mooloolah	Liberal	Marc Zande	**Bruce Laming** (Lib)	Janein McLeod		Santo Ferraro (Ind)
Mount Coot-tha	Labor	**Wendy Edmond**	Rolene Orford (Lib)	Drew Hutton		
Mount Gravatt	Labor	**Judy Spence**	Joe Hodgson (Lib)			
Mount Isa	Labor	**Tony McGrady**	Ronald Bird (Nat)			Clarence Walden (Ind)
Mount Ommaney	Labor	**Peter Pyke**	Bob Harper (Lib)	Sue Russell	Julie McCredden	Nicholas Kapsis (Ind)
Mulgrave	Labor	**Warren Pitt**	Naomi Wilson (Nat)	Jonathan Metcalfe	Sonya Kremser	
Mundingburra	Labor	**Ken Davies**	Frank Tanti (Lib)	Russell Cumming		
Murrumba	Labor	**Dean Wells**	Fran Jones (Lib)			
Nerang	Liberal	Elham Alamar	**Ray Connor** (Lib)	Antony Bradshaw		
Nicklin	National	Coleen Giles	**Neil Turner** (Nat)		Kirsten Kirk	
Noosa	Liberal	Ross Macleod	**Bruce Davidson** (Lib)			Ian McNiven (Ind)
Nudgee	Labor	Neil Roberts	Daniel Taylor (Lib)			
Redcliffe	Labor	**Ray Hollis**	Judy Beresford (Lib)		John Curtin	Leonard Matthews (Ind); Maureen Tyler (Ind)
Redlands	Labor	**John Budd**	John Hegarty (Nat)		Jenny Van Rooyen	Rosemary Skelly (Ind)
Rockhampton	Labor	Robert Schwarten	Sam Hassall (Nat)		Chris Head	Christopher Hooper (Ind); Nev Thring (Ind)
Sandgate	Labor	**Gordon Nuttall**	Anne Hobbs (Lib)			Steve Purtill (CAP)
South Brisbane	Labor	Anna Bligh	Marcus Clark (Lib)		Althea Smith	Tony Kneipp (Ind); Geoff Wilson (Ind)
Southport	National	Peter Lawlor	**Mick Veivers** (Nat)		Noel Payne	Robyn Cooper (Ind)
Springwood	Labor	**Molly Robson**	Luke Woolmer (Lib)	William Gabriel	Peter Collins	Allan de Brenni (Ind); Patrick O'Leary (Ind)
Sunnybank	Labor	**Stephen Robertson**	Lynne Friis (Lib)		Alan Dickson	
Surfers Paradise	National	Peter Burke	**Rob Borbidge** (Nat)		Brad Farmer	Christian Jocumsen (Ind)
Tablelands	National	Anthony Shearer	**Tom Gilmore** (Nat)		Andrew Howell	Jehan Hainaut (Ind)
Thuringowa	Labor	**Ken McElligott**	Richard Lane (Nat)		Annette Reed	
Toowoomba North	National	Des McGovern	**Graham Healy** (Nat)			Ray Webber (Ind)
Toowoomba South	National	Matt Russell	**Mike Horan** (Nat)			
Townsville	Labor	**Geoff Smith**	Chris Mills (Lib)	Antony Clunies-Ross		
Warrego	National	Murray Bensted	**Howard Hobbs** (Nat)			
Warwick	National	Michael Bathersby	**Lawrence Springborg** (Nat)	Sarah Moles		
Waterford	Labor	**Tom Barton**	Raymond Hamey (Lib)			
Western Downs	National	Brad Wood	**Brian Littleproud** (Nat)			
Whitsunday	Labor	**Lorraine Bird**	Debbie Perske (Nat)	Anni Philp	Robert Farr	Michelle Mac Nevin (Ind)
Woodridge	Labor	**Bill D'Arcy**	Matthew Cavanagh (Lib)			Anthony Davis (Ind)
Yeronga	Labor	**Matt Foley**	Salli Aitken (Lib)			Leonce Kealy (CAP); Bernadette Le Gouillon (Ind)

== See also ==
- Members of the Queensland Legislative Assembly, 1992–1995
- Members of the Queensland Legislative Assembly, 1995–1998
- 1995 Queensland state election
- List of political parties in Australia
