= Members of the Queensland Legislative Assembly, 1995–1998 =

This is a list of members of the 48th Legislative Assembly of Queensland from 1995 to 1998, as elected at the 1995 state election held on 15 July 1995.

Name	Party	Electorate	Term in office
Len Ardill	Labor	Archerfield	1986–1998
Tom Barton	Labor	Waterford	1992–2006
Bill Baumann	National	Albert	1995–2001
Hon Denver Beanland	Liberal	Indooroopilly	1986–2001
Peter Beattie	Labor	Brisbane Central	1989–2007
Lorraine Bird	Labor	Whitsunday	1989–1998
Anna Bligh	Labor	South Brisbane	1995–2012
Hon Rob Borbidge	National	Surfers Paradise	1980–2001
Hon Paul Braddy	Labor	Kedron	1985–2001
Steve Bredhauer	Labor	Cook	1989–2004
Darryl Briskey	Labor	Cleveland	1989–2006
Hon Tom Burns ^{[2]}	Labor	Lytton	1972–1996
Clem Campbell	Labor	Bundaberg	1983–1998
Frank Carroll	Liberal	Mansfield	1995–1998
Hon Ray Connor	Liberal	Nerang	1989–2001
Hon Russell Cooper	National	Crows Nest	1983–2001
Liz Cunningham	Independent	Gladstone	1995–2015
Bill D'Arcy	Labor	Woodridge	1972–1974, 1977–2000
Hon Bruce Davidson	Liberal	Noosa	1992–2001
Ken Davies ^{[1]}	Labor	Mundingburra	1989–1995
Hon Keith De Lacy	Labor	Cairns	1983–1998
Bob Dollin	Labor	Maryborough	1989–1998
Wendy Edmond	Labor	Mount Coot-tha	1989–2004
Hon Jim Elder	Labor	Capalaba	1989–2001
Tony Elliott	National	Cunningham	1974–2001
Tony Fitzgerald	National	Lockyer	1980–1998
Hon Matt Foley	Labor	Yeronga	1989–2001
Jim Fouras	Labor	Ashgrove	1977–1986, 1989–2006
Judy Gamin	National	Burleigh	1988–1989, 1992–2001
Hon Bob Gibbs	Labor	Bundamba	1977–1999
Hon Tom Gilmore	National	Tablelands	1986–1998
John Goss	Liberal	Aspley	1989–2001
Hon Wayne Goss	Labor	Logan	1983–1998
Allan Grice	National	Broadwater	1992–2001
Hon David Hamill	Labor	Ipswich	1983–2001
Bob Harper	Liberal	Mount Ommaney	1995–1998
Hon Ken Hayward	Labor	Kallangur	1986–2009
Graham Healy	National	Toowoomba North	1992–2001
John Hegarty	National	Redlands	1995–2001
Hon Howard Hobbs	National	Warrego	1986–2015
Ray Hollis	Labor	Redcliffe	1989–2005
Hon Mike Horan	National	Toowoomba South	1991–2012
Hon Vaughan Johnson	National	Gregory	1989–2015
Bruce Laming	Liberal	Mooloolah	1992–2001
Linda Lavarch ^{[3]}	Labor	Kurwongbah	1997–2009
Hon Vince Lester	National	Keppel	1974–2004
Hon Kev Lingard	National	Beaudesert	1983–2009
Hon Brian Littleproud	National	Western Downs	1983–2001
Don Livingstone	Labor	Ipswich West	1989–1998, 2001–2006
Paul Lucas ^{[2]}	Labor	Lytton	1996–2012
Hon Di McCauley	National	Callide	1986–1998
Ken McElligott	Labor	Thuringowa	1983–1998
Hon Tony McGrady	Labor	Mount Isa	1989–2006
Hon Terry Mackenroth	Labor	Chatsworth	1977–2005
Ted Malone	National	Mirani	1994–2015
Hon Glen Milliner	Labor	Ferny Grove	1977–1998
Rob Mitchell	National	Charters Towers	1992–2001
Tim Mulherin	Labor	Mackay	1995–2015
Bill Nunn	Labor	Hervey Bay	1989–1998
Gordon Nuttall	Labor	Sandgate	1992–2006
Henry Palaszczuk	Labor	Inala	1984–2006
Jim Pearce	Labor	Fitzroy	1989–2009, 2015–2017
Hon Trevor Perrett	National	Barambah	1988–1998
Pat Purcell	Labor	Bulimba	1992–2009
Hon Bob Quinn	Liberal	Merrimac	1989–2006
Ted Radke	Liberal	Greenslopes	1995–1998
Neil Roberts	Labor	Nudgee	1995–2012
Stephen Robertson	Labor	Sunnybank	1992–2012
Merri Rose	Labor	Currumbin	1992–2004
Marc Rowell	National	Hinchinbrook	1989–2006
Hon Santo Santoro	Liberal	Clayfield	1989–2001
Robert Schwarten	Labor	Rockhampton	1989–1992, 1995–2012
Hon Joan Sheldon	Liberal	Caloundra	1990–2004
Fiona Simpson	National	Maroochydore	1992–present
Hon Doug Slack	National	Burnett	1986–2001
Hon Geoff Smith	Labor	Townsville	1980–1998
Judy Spence	Labor	Mount Gravatt	1989–2012
Lawrence Springborg	National	Warwick	1989–2017
Len Stephan	National	Gympie	1979–2001
Mark Stoneman	National	Burdekin	1983–1998
Jon Sullivan	Labor	Caboolture	1989–1998
Terry Sullivan	Labor	Chermside	1991–2006
Frank Tanti ^{[1]}	Liberal	Mundingburra	1996–1998
Hon Neil Turner	National	Nicklin	1974–1986, 1991–1998
Hon Mick Veivers	National	Southport	1987–2001
Lyn Warwick	Liberal	Barron River	1995–1998
Dr David Watson	Liberal	Moggill	1989–2004
Rod Welford	Labor	Everton	1989–2009
Hon Dean Wells	Labor	Murrumba	1986–2012
Naomi Wilson	National	Mulgrave	1995–1998
Margaret Woodgate ^{[3]}	Labor	Kurwongbah	1989–1997
Luke Woolmer	Liberal	Springwood	1995–1998

^{1} The Labor member for Mundingburra, Ken Davies, was initially declared re-elected at the 1995 election by a margin of 16 votes, but the result was overturned by the Court of Disputed Returns on 8 December 1995. Liberal candidate Frank Tanti won the resulting by-election on 3 February 1996, resulting in the Goss Ministry being defeated on the floor of the Assembly.
^{2} On 16 May 1996, the Labor member for Lytton, Tom Burns, resigned. Labor candidate Paul Lucas won the resulting by-election on 5 October 1996.
^{3} On 17 March 1997, the Labor member for Kurwongbah, Margaret Woodgate, resigned. Labor candidate Linda Lavarch won the resulting by-election on 24 May 1997.

== See also ==
- 1995 Queensland state election
- Goss Ministry (Labor) (1989–1996)
- Borbidge Ministry (National/Liberal) (1996–1998)
