= Members of the Queensland Legislative Assembly, 1992–1995 =

This is a list of members of the 47th Legislative Assembly of Queensland from 1992 to 1995, as elected at the 1992 state election held on 19 September 1992.

Name	Party	Electorate	Term in office
Len Ardill	Labor	Archerfield	1986–1998
Tom Barton	Labor	Waterford	1992–2006
Denver Beanland	Liberal	Indooroopilly	1986–2001
Peter Beattie	Labor	Brisbane Central	1989–2007
Neil Bennett	Labor	Gladstone	1992–1995
Lorraine Bird	Labor	Whitsunday	1989–1998
Rob Borbidge	National	Surfers Paradise	1980–2001
Hon Paul Braddy	Labor	Rockhampton	1985–2001
Steve Bredhauer	Labor	Cook	1989–2004
Darryl Briskey	Labor	Cleveland	1989–2006
John Budd	Labor	Redlands	1992–1995
Hon Tom Burns	Labor	Lytton	1972–1996
Clem Campbell	Labor	Bundaberg	1983–1998
Hon Ed Casey	Labor	Mackay	1969–1995
Dr Lesley Clark	Labor	Barron River	1989–1995, 1998–2006
Hon Pat Comben	Labor	Kedron	1983–1995
Hon Ray Connor	Liberal	Nerang	1989–2001
Hon Russell Cooper	National	Crows Nest	1983–2001
Bill D'Arcy	Labor	Woodridge	1972–1974, 1977–2000
Bruce Davidson	Liberal	Noosa	1992–2001
Ken Davies	Labor	Mundingburra	1989–1995
Hon Keith De Lacy	Labor	Cairns	1983–1998
Bob Dollin	Labor	Maryborough	1989–1998
Wendy Edmond	Labor	Mount Coot-tha	1989–2004
Hon Jim Elder	Labor	Capalaba	1989–2001
Tony Elliott	National	Cunningham	1974–2001
Gary Fenlon	Labor	Greenslopes	1989–1995, 1998–2009
Tony Fitzgerald	National	Lockyer	1980–1998
Hon Matt Foley	Labor	Yeronga	1989–2004
Hon Jim Fouras	Labor	Ashgrove	1977–1986, 1989–2006
Judy Gamin	National	Burleigh	1988–1989, 1992–2001
Hon Bob Gibbs	Labor	Bundamba	1977–1999
Tom Gilmore	National	Tablelands	1986–1998
John Goss	Liberal	Aspley	1989–2001
Hon Wayne Goss	Labor	Logan	1983–1998
Allan Grice	National	Broadwater	1992–2001
Hon David Hamill	Labor	Ipswich	1983–2001
Hon Ken Hayward	Labor	Kallangur	1986–2009
Graham Healy	National	Toowoomba North	1992–2001
Howard Hobbs	National	Warrego	1986–2015
Ray Hollis	Labor	Redcliffe	1989–2005
Mike Horan	National	Toowoomba South	1991–2012
Vaughan Johnson	National	Gregory	1989–2015
Bruce Laming	Liberal	Mooloolah	1992–2001
Vince Lester	National	Keppel	1974–2004
Kev Lingard	National	Beaudesert	1983–2009
Hon Brian Littleproud	National	Western Downs	1983–2001
Don Livingstone	Labor	Ipswich West	1989–1998, 2001–2006
Hon Terry Mackenroth	Labor	Chatsworth	1977–2005
Ted Malone ^{[1]}	National	Mirani	1994–2015
Di McCauley	National	Callide	1986–1998
Ken McElligott	Labor	Thuringowa	1983–1998
Hon Tony McGrady	Labor	Mount Isa	1989–2006
Hon Glen Milliner	Labor	Ferny Grove	1977–1998
Rob Mitchell	National	Charters Towers	1992–2001
Bill Nunn	Labor	Hervey Bay	1989–1998
Gordon Nuttall	Labor	Sandgate	1992–2006
Henry Palaszczuk	Labor	Inala	1984–2006
Jim Pearce	Labor	Fitzroy	1989–2009, 2015–2017
Trevor Perrett	National	Barambah	1988–1998
Hon Warren Pitt	Labor	Mulgrave	1989–1995, 1998–2009
Laurel Power	Labor	Mansfield	1989–1995
Pat Purcell	Labor	Bulimba	1992–2009
Peter Pyke	Labor	Mount Ommaney	1992–1995
Bob Quinn	Liberal	Merrimac	1989–2006
Jim Randell ^{[1]}	National	Mirani	1980–1994
Stephen Robertson	Labor	Sunnybank	1992–2012
Hon Molly Robson	Labor	Springwood	1989–1995
Merri Rose	Labor	Currumbin	1992–2004
Marc Rowell	National	Hinchinbrook	1989–2006
Santo Santoro	Liberal	Clayfield	1989–2001
Joan Sheldon	Liberal	Caloundra	1990–2004
Fiona Simpson	National	Maroochydore	1992–present
Doug Slack	National	Burnett	1986–2001
Hon Geoff Smith	Labor	Townsville	1980–1998
Judy Spence	Labor	Mount Gravatt	1989–2012
Lawrence Springborg	National	Warwick	1989–2017
Len Stephan	National	Gympie	1979–2001
Mark Stoneman	National	Burdekin	1983–1998
Jon Sullivan	Labor	Caboolture	1989–1998
Terry Sullivan	Labor	Chermside	1991–2006
John Szczerbanik	Labor	Albert	1989–1995
Hon Neil Turner	National	Nicklin	1974–1986, 1991–1998
Ken Vaughan	Labor	Nudgee	1977–1995
Mick Veivers	National	Southport	1987–2001
Hon Anne Warner	Labor	South Brisbane	1983–1995
Dr David Watson	Liberal	Moggill	1989–2004
Rod Welford	Labor	Everton	1989–2009
Hon Dean Wells	Labor	Murrumba	1986–2012
Margaret Woodgate	Labor	Kurwongbah	1989–1997

^{1} On 31 March 1994, the National member for Mirani, Jim Randell, resigned. National candidate Ted Malone won the resulting by-election on 30 April 1994.

== See also ==
- 1992 Queensland state election
- Goss Ministry (Labor) (1989–1996)
