= Results of the 1998 Queensland state election =

Queensland state election, 13 June 1998 Legislative Assembly << 1995–2001 >>
Enrolled voters	2,115,977				
Votes cast	1,964,778		Turnout	92.85	+1.42
Informal votes	28,438		Informal	1.45	–0.30
Summary of votes by party
Party	Primary votes	%	Swing	Seats	Change
Labor	773,585	38.86	–4.03	44	±0
One Nation	439,121	22.68	+22.68	11	+11
Liberal	311,514	16.09	–6.65	9	–5
National	293,839	15.17	–11.08	23	–7
Greens	45,709	2.36	–0.51	0	±0
Democrats	31,119	1.61	+0.36	0	±0
Australia First	9,560	0.49	+0.49	0	±0
Reform	7,658	0.40	+0.40	0	±0
Christian Democrats	2,098	0.11		0	±0
Shooters	1,058	0.05	+0.05	0	±0
Women's Party	299	0.01	+0.01	0	±0
Independent	41,991	2.17	–1.30	2	+1
Total	1,936,340			89	

This is a list of electoral district results for the 1998 Queensland state election.

Percentage of first preference votes for One Nation in each electorate in the 1998 Queensland state election.

Winning party by electorate.

Candidates finishing in second place on a two-candidate-preferred basis (after full distribution of preferences) in each electorate.

== Results by electoral district ==
=== Albert ===
1998 Queensland state election: Albert
Party	Candidate	Votes	%	±%
National	Bill Baumann	9,920	33.8	−14.2
Labor	Peter Shooter	9,772	33.3	−6.3
One Nation	Rod Evans	7,909	26.9	+26.9
Greens	Sally Spain	1,472	5.0	−1.2
Reform	Lyn Green	305	1.0	+1.0
Total formal votes		29,378	98.3	+0.2
Informal votes		519	1.7	−0.2
Turnout		29,897	91.7	
Two-party-preferred result
National	Bill Baumann	14,500	54.8	+0.9
Labor	Peter Shooter	11,943	45.2	−0.9
National hold		Swing	+0.9	

=== Archerfield ===
1998 Queensland state election: Archerfield
Party	Candidate	Votes	%	±%
Labor	Karen Struthers	12,453	49.54	−6.57
Liberal	Fazal Deen	6,112	24.31	−19.58
One Nation	Rodger Pryor	5,251	20.89	+20.89
Greens	Rocco De Pierri	826	3.29	+3.29
Reform	Allen Hrstich	497	1.98	+1.98
Total formal votes		25,139	98.33	+0.65
Informal votes		426	1.67	−0.65
Turnout		25,565	94.01	+1.75
Two-party-preferred result
Labor	Karen Struthers	14,278	61.71	+5.60
Liberal	Fazal Deen	8,860	38.29	−5.60
Labor hold		Swing	+5.60	

=== Ashgrove ===
1998 Queensland state election: Ashgrove
Party	Candidate	Votes	%	±%
Labor	Jim Fouras	9,688	48.4	+3.9
Liberal	Alan Sherlock	7,650	38.2	−5.1
Australia First	Ray Sargent	1,044	5.2	+3.9
Greens	Brenda Mason	1,028	5.1	+5.1
Democrats	Justin Yeend	593	3.0	−4.7
Total formal votes		20,003	98.7	+0.2
Informal votes		269	1.3	−0.2
Turnout		20,272	92.8	
Two-party-preferred result
Labor	Jim Fouras	10,873	56.1	+4.8
Liberal	Alan Sherlock	8,509	43.9	−4.8
Labor hold		Swing	+4.8	

=== Aspley ===
1998 Queensland state election: Aspley
Party	Candidate	Votes	%	±%
Liberal	John Goss	9,801	39.8	−11.9
Labor	Steve Davey	9,732	39.5	+0.8
One Nation	Ron Eaton	3,763	15.3	+15.3
Greens	Alison Green	712	2.9	+2.9
Democrats	Bruce Kent	514	2.1	−3.9
Reform	Tony Argent	124	0.5	+0.5
Total formal votes		24,646	98.8	+0.3
Informal votes		304	1.2	−0.3
Turnout		24,950	93.8	
Two-party-preferred result
Liberal	John Goss	11,923	51.8	−5.1
Labor	Steve Davey	11,106	48.2	+5.1
Liberal hold		Swing	−5.1	

=== Barambah ===
1998 Queensland state election: Barambah
Party	Candidate	Votes	%	±%
One Nation	Dorothy Pratt	9,464	43.54	+43.54
National	Trevor Perrett	6,731	30.96	−36.25
Labor	Michael Crook	3,794	17.45	−6.09
Australia First	Rod Morgan	1,100	5.06	+5.06
Independent	Steve Jeffery	491	2.26	+2.26
Independent	Peter Hayden	158	0.73	+0.73
Total formal votes		21,738	98.73	+0.22
Informal votes		280	1.27	−0.22
Turnout		22,018	94.68	+1.24
Two-candidate-preferred result
One Nation	Dorothy Pratt	11,025	55.85	+55.85
National	Trevor Perrett	8,715	44.15	−30.25
One Nation gain from National		Swing	+55.85	

=== Barron River ===
1998 Queensland state election: Barron River
Party	Candidate	Votes	%	±%
Labor	Lesley Clark	7,118	35.2	−3.1
Liberal	Lyn Warwick	6,050	29.9	+3.8
One Nation	Peter Starr	5,457	27.0	+27.0
Greens	Denis Walls	1,037	5.1	−5.3
Democrats	Lisa Golding	313	1.5	−0.7
Independent	Steve Dimitriou	270	1.3	+0.0
Total formal votes		20,245	98.9	+0.3
Informal votes		235	1.1	−0.3
Turnout		235	90.9	
Two-party-preferred result
Labor	Lesley Clark	9,287	50.6	+1.0
Liberal	Lyn Warwick	9,057	49.4	−1.0
Labor gain from Liberal		Swing	+1.0	

=== Beaudesert ===
1998 Queensland state election: Beaudesert
Party	Candidate	Votes	%	±%
National	Kev Lingard	7,766	32.9	−23.3
Labor	Michael De Lacy	7,388	31.3	−5.4
One Nation	Gordon Wadsworth	6,464	27.4	+27.4
Australia First	Nick Duke	780	3.3	+3.3
Greens	Bill Livermore	721	3.1	+3.1
Reform	Don Green	202	0.9	+0.9
Shooters	Vin McNamara	148	0.6	+0.6
Independent	Ian Dillon	122	0.5	+0.5
Total formal votes		23,591	98.4	−0.1
Informal votes		381	1.6	+0.1
Turnout		23,972	93.8	+1.7
Two-party-preferred result
National	Kev Lingard	10,734	54.1	−5.4
Labor	Michael De Lacy	9,111	45.9	+5.4
National hold		Swing	−5.4	

=== Brisbane Central ===
1998 Queensland state election: Brisbane Central
Party	Candidate	Votes	%	±%
Labor	Peter Beattie	10,632	53.7	+3.7
Liberal	Tony Gleeson	5,179	26.2	−9.4
One Nation	John Beattie	1,925	9.7	+9.7
Greens	Richard Nielsen	932	4.7	−4.7
Democrats	Nicky Jones	783	4.0	+4.0
Independent	Graham Matthews	351	1.8	+1.8
Total formal votes		19,802	98.5	+0.5
Informal votes		308	1.5	−0.5
Turnout		20,110	89.3	+2.0
Two-party-preferred result
Labor	Peter Beattie	12,241	65.1	+4.9
Liberal	Tony Gleeson	6,549	34.9	−4.9
Labor hold		Swing	+4.9	

=== Broadwater ===
1998 Queensland state election: Broadwater
Party	Candidate	Votes	%	±%
National	Allan Grice	8,756	39.5	−21.7
Labor	Bob Brown	6,650	30.0	−8.8
One Nation	Rosita Petch	5,802	26.2	+26.2
Greens	Marie Robb	956	4.3	+4.3
Total formal votes		22,164	98.3	+0.2
Informal votes		394	1.7	−0.2
Turnout		22,558	90.4	+1.5
Two-party-preferred result
National	Allan Grice	11,489	59.8	−1.4
Labor	Bob Brown	7,733	40.2	+1.4
National hold		Swing	−1.4	

=== Bulimba ===
1998 Queensland state election: Bulimba
Party	Candidate	Votes	%	±%
Labor	Pat Purcell	11,787	56.8	+0.9
Liberal	Marjorie Threapleton	4,393	21.2	−11.5
One Nation	Nigel Gibson	3,066	14.8	+14.8
Greens	Greg George	942	4.5	−7.0
Democrats	Mark Ault	494	2.4	+2.4
Reform	Wayne Jenkins	84	0.4	+0.4
Total formal votes		20,766	98.5	+0.4
Informal votes		316	1.5	−0.4
Turnout		21,082	92.6	+1.3
Two-party-preferred result
Labor	Pat Purcell	13,514	69.5	+6.9
Liberal	Marjorie Threapleton	5,929	30.5	−6.9
Labor hold		Swing	+6.9	

=== Bundaberg ===
1998 Queensland state election: Bundaberg
Party	Candidate	Votes	%	±%
Labor	Nita Cunningham	8,801	44.4	−6.1
One Nation	Bernard Barry	5,819	29.3	+29.3
National	David Porter	4,709	23.7	−25.7
Greens	Ray Pearce	303	1.5	+1.5
Democrats	Lance Hall	198	1.0	+1.0
Total formal votes		19,830	98.9	+0.4
Informal votes		213	1.1	−0.4
Turnout		20,043	93.5	+0.9
Two-candidate-preferred result
Labor	Nita Cunningham	9,743	52.0	+1.5
One Nation	Bernard Barry	8,979	48.0	+48.0
Labor hold		Swing	+1.5	

=== Bundamba ===
1998 Queensland state election: Bundamba
Party	Candidate	Votes	%	±%
Labor	Bob Gibbs	10,030	48.2	−10.0
One Nation	Colene Hughes	7,135	34.3	+34.3
Liberal	Jeff Matijasevic	2,472	11.9	−12.6
Greens	John McKeon	614	2.9	+2.9
Democrats	Andre Klingbeil	577	2.8	+2.8
Total formal votes		20,828	98.3	+1.4
Informal votes		358	1.7	−1.4
Turnout		21,186	92.9	+1.9
Two-candidate-preferred result
Labor	Bob Gibbs	11,213	56.2	−8.6
One Nation	Colene Hughes	8,733	43.8	+43.8
Labor hold		Swing	−8.6	

=== Burdekin ===
1998 Queensland state election: Burdekin
Party	Candidate	Votes	%	±%
One Nation	Jeff Knuth	7,657	33.1	+33.1
Labor	Les Walker	7,307	31.6	−5.9
National	Terry Morato	6,693	28.9	−29.0
Australia First	Elaine Steley	963	4.2	+4.2
Democrats	Maurie Nichols	535	2.3	+2.3
Total formal votes		23,155	98.7	+0.3
Informal votes		296	1.3	−0.3
Turnout		23,451	93.8	+2.1
Two-candidate-preferred result
One Nation	Jeff Knuth	12,725	59.4	+59.4
Labor	Les Walker	8,692	40.6	+1.2
One Nation gain from National		Swing	+59.4	

=== Burleigh ===
1998 Queensland state election: Burleigh
Party	Candidate	Votes	%	±%
National	Judy Gamin	8,431	41.3	−12.5
Labor	Michael Lennon	6,581	32.2	−7.7
One Nation	Terry Sharples	4,403	21.6	+21.6
Greens	David Byerlee	995	4.9	+4.9
Total formal votes		20,410	98.4	+0.1
Informal votes		329	1.6	−0.1
Turnout		20,739	91.1	+1.2
Two-party-preferred result
National	Judy Gamin	11,088	58.5	+1.1
Labor	Michael Lennon	7,882	41.5	−1.1
National hold		Swing	+1.1	

=== Burnett ===
1998 Queensland state election: Burnett
Party	Candidate	Votes	%	±%
One Nation	Glen Onoprienko	10,076	36.4	+36.4
National	Doug Slack	8,993	32.5	−28.6
Labor	Greg McMahon	7,607	27.5	−11.4
Greens	Christine Kret	786	2.8	+2.8
Independent	Richard Smith	201	0.7	+0.7
Total formal votes		27,663	98.9	+0.4
Informal votes		312	1.1	−0.4
Turnout		27,975	94.0	+0.6
Two-candidate-preferred result
National	Doug Slack	12,648	52.3	−8.8
One Nation	Glen Onoprienko	11,521	47.7	+47.7
National hold		Swing	−8.8	

=== Caboolture ===
1998 Queensland state election: Caboolture
Party	Candidate	Votes	%	±%
Labor	Jon Sullivan	10,471	39.14	−8.28
One Nation	Bill Feldman	8,008	29.93	+29.93
National	Peter Lacey	6,222	23.26	−20.11
Independent	Bill Newton	1,331	4.98	+4.98
Democrats	Liz Oss-Emer	581	2.17	−2.37
Reform	Brian O'Grady	140	0.52	+0.52
Total formal votes		26,753	98.43	−0.04
Informal votes		426	1.57	+0.04
Turnout		27,179	93.98	+0.29
Two-candidate-preferred result
One Nation	Bill Feldman	13,245	52.69	+52.69
Labor	Jon Sullivan	11,894	47.31	−4.96
One Nation gain from Labor		Swing	+52.69	

=== Cairns ===
1998 Queensland state election: Cairns
Party	Candidate	Votes	%	±%
Labor	Desley Boyle	7,186	39.1	−7.8
One Nation	Peter Boniface	5,067	27.5	+27.5
Liberal	Myles Thompson	4,318	23.5	−18.3
Independent	Nev Bates	994	5.4	+5.4
Greens	Jonathan Metcalfe	835	4.5	−2.9
Total formal votes		18,400	98.7	+0.3
Informal votes		250	1.3	−0.3
Turnout		18,650	88.5	+4.2
Two-candidate-preferred result
Labor	Desley Boyle	9,035	52.3	+0.0
One Nation	Peter Boniface	8,253	47.7	+47.7
Labor hold		Swing	+0.0	

=== Callide ===
1998 Queensland state election: Callide
Party	Candidate	Votes	%	±%
National	Jeff Seeney	6,597	37.7	−36.7
One Nation	Chris Savage	6,566	37.5	+37.5
Labor	Gary Barton	3,335	19.0	−1.7
Australia First	Dolores Fowler	1,013	5.8	+5.8
Total formal votes		17,511	99.0	+0.1
Informal votes		175	1.0	−0.1
Turnout		17,686	95.2	+0.3
Two-candidate-preferred result
National	Jeff Seeney	8,432	52.3	−25.5
One Nation	Chris Savage	7,696	47.7	+47.7
National hold		Swing	−25.5	

=== Caloundra ===
1998 Queensland state election: Caloundra
Party	Candidate	Votes	%	±%
Liberal	Joan Sheldon	9,625	40.5	−14.3
Labor	Don Wilson	6,680	28.1	−10.0
One Nation	Bronwyn Boag	5,930	24.9	+24.9
Greens	Louise Peach	1,086	4.6	+4.6
Australia First	John Goldsworthy	468	2.0	+2.0
Total formal votes		23,789	98.7	+0.3
Informal votes		305	1.3	−0.3
Turnout		24,094	93.2	+0.9
Two-party-preferred result
Liberal	Joan Sheldon	13,022	60.7	+2.6
Labor	Don Wilson	8,441	39.3	−2.6
Liberal hold		Swing	+2.6	

=== Capalaba ===
1998 Queensland state election: Capalaba
Party	Candidate	Votes	%	±%
Labor	Jim Elder	11,398	54.9	−3.9
Liberal	Richard Ferrett	5,748	27.7	−13.6
Independent	David Exelby	2,412	11.6	+11.6
Greens	Julie-Anne O'Donohue	1,215	5.8	+5.8
Total formal votes		20,773	97.7	+0.0
Informal votes		496	2.3	−0.0
Turnout		21,269	93.9	+0.9
Two-party-preferred result
Labor	Jim Elder	12,341	63.7	+5.0
Liberal	Richard Ferrett	7,027	36.3	−5.0
Labor hold		Swing	+5.0	

=== Charters Towers ===
1998 Queensland state election: Charters Towers
Party	Candidate	Votes	%	±%
Labor	Christine Scott	5,758	37.1	−2.5
National	Rob Mitchell	5,454	35.2	−20.0
One Nation	Richard O'Pray	4,066	26.2	+26.2
Shooters	Peter Salisbury	116	0.8	+0.8
Reform	Ben Dyball	114	0.7	+0.7
Total formal votes		15,508	99.2	+0.3
Informal votes		128	0.8	−0.3
Turnout		15,636	93.2	+0.5
Two-party-preferred result
National	Rob Mitchell	7,706	53.7	−4.3
Labor	Christine Scott	6,641	46.3	+4.3
National hold		Swing	−4.3	

=== Chatsworth ===
1998 Queensland state election: Chatsworth
Party	Candidate	Votes	%	±%
Labor	Terry Mackenroth	11,953	50.2	−2.1
Liberal	Bruce Martin	6,713	28.2	−13.9
One Nation	Brian Annear-Walker	4,015	16.9	+16.9
Greens	Clare Rudkin	1,126	4.7	+4.7
Total formal votes		23,807	98.3	+0.3
Informal votes		400	1.7	−0.3
Turnout		24,207	93.9	+0.5
Two-party-preferred result
Labor	Terry Mackenroth	13,440	58.7	+4.5
Liberal	Bruce Martin	9,455	41.3	−4.5
Labor hold		Swing	+4.5	

=== Chermside ===
1998 Queensland state election: Chermside
Party	Candidate	Votes	%	±%
Labor	Terry Sullivan	9,345	49.89	−1.97
Liberal	Zenia Belcher	5,623	30.02	−12.16
One Nation	Hazel Walsh	2,905	15.51	+15.51
Democrats	John Lambert	717	3.83	+3.83
Reform	Noel Otto	141	0.75	+0.75
Total formal votes		18,731	98.67	+0.19
Informal votes		253	1.33	−0.19
Turnout		18,984	93.13	−0.21
Two-party-preferred result
Labor	Terry Sullivan	10,456	59.02	+3.68
Liberal	Zenia Belcher	7,260	40.98	−3.68
Labor hold		Swing	+3.68	

=== Clayfield ===
1998 Queensland state election: Clayfield
Party	Candidate	Votes	%	±%
Liberal	Santo Santoro	10,107	52.6	−7.5
Labor	Liddy Clark	7,498	39.0	+5.4
Greens	Malcolm Lewis	871	4.5	+4.5
Democrats	Michael Brown	756	3.9	−2.4
Total formal votes		19,232	98.3	−0.3
Informal votes		331	1.7	+0.3
Turnout		19,563	92.0	+0.8
Two-party-preferred result
Liberal	Santo Santoro	10,481	56.5	−7.6
Labor	Liddy Clark	8,054	43.5	+7.6
Liberal hold		Swing	−7.6	

=== Cleveland ===
1998 Queensland state election: Cleveland
Party	Candidate	Votes	%	±%
Labor	Darryl Briskey	10,506	43.7	−3.8
Liberal	Damien Massingham	7,391	30.8	−12.7
One Nation	Bluey Bostock	4,644	19.3	+19.3
Democrats	Jenny Van Rooyen	833	3.5	−5.5
Independent	Phil Ball	477	2.0	+2.0
Reform	Barry Archie	176	0.7	+0.7
Total formal votes		24,027	98.6	+0.1
Informal votes		352	1.4	−0.1
Turnout		24,379	93.9	+1.5
Two-party-preferred result
Labor	Darryl Briskey	12,490	56.4	+4.0
Liberal	Damien Massingham	9,648	43.6	−4.0
Labor hold		Swing	+4.0	

=== Cook ===
1998 Queensland state election: Cook
Party	Candidate	Votes	%	±%
Labor	Steve Bredhauer	8,370	54.6	+2.1
One Nation	Carmel Mitchell	3,124	20.4	+20.4
National	Terry Cranwell	2,989	19.5	−16.6
Independent	Edgar Williams	482	3.1	−3.4
Reform	Smiley Burnett	351	2.3	+2.3
Total formal votes		15,316	98.6	+0.6
Informal votes		218	1.4	−0.6
Turnout		15,534	86.8	+3.4
Two-candidate-preferred result
Labor	Steve Bredhauer	9,507	65.5	+7.8
One Nation	Carmel Mitchell	5,002	34.5	+34.5
Labor hold		Swing	+7.8	

=== Crows Nest ===
1998 Queensland state election: Crows Nest
Party	Candidate	Votes	%	±%
One Nation	David Cockburn	9,342	39.50	+39.50
National	Russell Cooper	9,060	38.31	−33.25
Labor	Fiona Bucknall	3,908	16.53	−4.67
Greens	John Langford	704	2.98	−4.26
Reform	Brenda Moloney	635	2.69	+2.69
Total formal votes		23,649	99.02	+0.16
Informal votes		234	0.98	−0.16
Turnout		23,883	94.83	+1.08
Two-candidate-preferred result
National	Russell Cooper	10,940	50.88	−24.67
One Nation	David Cockburn	10,563	49.12	+49.12
National hold		Swing	−24.67	

=== Cunningham ===
1998 Queensland state election: Cunningham
Party	Candidate	Votes	%	±%
National	Tony Elliott	10,384	43.2	−30.6
One Nation	Sherry Passfield	7,774	32.4	+32.4
Labor	Jackie Trad	4,535	18.9	−7.3
Independent	Ken Davies	605	2.5	+2.5
Independent	Anne Smeaton	399	1.7	+1.7
Reform	Bill Ison	324	1.4	+1.4
Total formal votes		24,021	98.8	+0.6
Informal votes		301	1.2	−0.6
Turnout		24,322	93.7	+1.3
Two-candidate-preferred result
National	Tony Elliott	12,507	58.8	−15.0
One Nation	Sherry Passfield	8,744	41.2	+41.2
National hold		Swing	−15.0	

=== Currumbin ===
1998 Queensland state election: Currumbin
Party	Candidate	Votes	%	±%
Labor	Merri Rose	8,982	40.6	−5.7
One Nation	Paul Boyle	4,537	20.5	+20.5
National	Sue Robbins	4,475	20.2	+20.2
Liberal	Warrick Coleborne	3,155	14.3	−30.9
Greens	John Palmer	898	4.1	−3.4
Independent	Mick Gay	56	0.3	+0.3
Total formal votes		22,103	98.6	+0.0
Informal votes		308	1.4	−0.0
Turnout		22,411	91.9	+1.6
Two-party-preferred result
Labor	Merri Rose	10,683	52.8	+1.2
National	Sue Robbins	9,558	47.2	+47.2
Labor hold		Swing	+1.2	

=== Everton ===
1998 Queensland state election: Everton
Party	Candidate	Votes	%	±%
Labor	Rod Welford	10,686	47.2	−3.7
Liberal	Karen Jones	7,329	32.4	−16.6
One Nation	Ken Brady	3,481	15.4	+15.4
Democrats	Brett Matthews	1,120	5.0	+5.0
Total formal votes		22,616	98.8	+0.6
Informal votes		269	1.2	−0.6
Turnout		22,885	94.6	+0.6
Two-party-preferred result
Labor	Rod Welford	12,194	56.0	+5.0
Liberal	Karen Jones	9,585	44.0	−5.0
Labor hold		Swing	+5.0	

=== Ferny Grove ===
1998 Queensland state election: Ferny Grove
Party	Candidate	Votes	%	±%
Labor	Geoff Wilson	11,049	45.0	−0.9
Liberal	Ashley Manicaros	6,955	28.3	−12.1
One Nation	Kevin John	4,333	17.6	+17.6
Democrats	Suzanne Lawson	1,224	5.0	+5.0
Greens	Mark Taylor	989	4.0	−5.3
Total formal votes		24,550	98.8	+0.3
Informal votes		289	1.2	−0.3
Turnout		24,839	94.7	+0.8
Two-party-preferred result
Labor	Geoff Wilson	13,407	58.6	+5.3
Liberal	Ashley Manicaros	9,480	41.4	−5.3
Labor hold		Swing	+5.3	

=== Fitzroy ===
1998 Queensland state election: Fitzroy
Party	Candidate	Votes	%	±%
Labor	Jim Pearce	10,214	52.2	−4.4
One Nation	Joan Wilson	4,402	22.5	+22.5
National	Richie Bills	4,069	20.8	−22.6
Australia First	Christopher Chatham	641	3.3	+3.3
Democrats	Peter Cvetko-Lueger	241	1.2	+1.2
Total formal votes		19,567	99.2	+0.6
Informal votes		161	0.8	−0.6
Turnout		19,728	93.9	+1.8
Two-candidate-preferred result
Labor	Jim Pearce	11,276	60.7	+4.1
One Nation	Joan Wilson	7,295	39.3	+39.3
Labor hold		Swing	+4.1	

=== Gladstone ===
1998 Queensland state election: Gladstone
Party	Candidate	Votes	%	±%
Labor	Leo Zussino	10,897	47.4	+3.8
Independent	Liz Cunningham	10,812	47.0	+7.0
National	Paul Ford	1,271	5.5	−6.9
Total formal votes		22,980	98.9	+0.2
Informal votes		258	1.1	−0.2
Turnout		23,238	94.4	+1.4
Two-candidate-preferred result
Independent	Liz Cunningham	11,691	51.4	−1.7
Labor	Leo Zussino	11,071	48.6	+1.7
Independent hold		Swing	−1.7	

=== Greenslopes ===
1998 Queensland state election: Greenslopes
Party	Candidate	Votes	%	±%
Labor	Gary Fenlon	9,382	47.9	−2.0
Liberal	Ted Radke	7,902	40.3	−9.8
Greens	Libby Connors	901	4.6	+4.6
Democrats	John Cherry	586	3.0	+3.0
Independent	Nigel Freemarijuana	354	1.8	+1.8
Women's Party	Jenny Hughey	299	1.5	+1.5
Reform	Paul Feeney	167	0.9	+0.9
Total formal votes		19,591	98.6	+0.7
Informal votes		283	1.4	−0.7
Turnout		19,874	92.9	+0.6
Two-party-preferred result
Labor	Gary Fenlon	10,498	55.2	+5.3
Liberal	Ted Radke	8,530	44.8	−5.3
Labor gain from Liberal		Swing	+5.3	

=== Gregory ===
1998 Queensland state election: Gregory
Party	Candidate	Votes	%	±%
National	Vaughan Johnson	6,873	46.7	−22.2
Labor	Donna O'Donoghue	4,228	28.7	−2.4
One Nation	Allan Bahr	2,554	17.4	+17.4
Australia First	Ron Crozier	640	4.4	+4.4
Democrats	Rebecca Hack	303	2.1	+2.1
Shooters	Frank Taylor	110	0.7	+0.7
Total formal votes		14,708	99.0	+0.5
Informal votes		142	1.0	−0.5
Turnout		14,850	93.9	+1.6
Two-party-preferred result
National	Vaughan Johnson	8,553	63.1	−5.8
Labor	Donna O'Donoghue	5,006	36.9	+5.8
National hold		Swing	−5.8	

=== Gympie ===
1998 Queensland state election: Gympie
Party	Candidate	Votes	%	±%
One Nation	Ian Petersen	8,745	39.2	+39.2
National	Len Stephan	6,971	31.3	−23.3
Labor	David Warren	5,806	26.1	−4.7
Greens	Chris Gwin	764	3.4	+3.4
Total formal votes		22,286	98.7	+0.1
Informal votes		284	1.3	−0.1
Turnout		22,570	93.8	+0.9
Two-candidate-preferred result
National	Len Stephan	10,486	51.7	−10.9
One Nation	Ian Petersen	9,796	48.3	+48.3
National hold		Swing	−10.9	

=== Hervey Bay ===
1998 Queensland state election: Hervey Bay
Party	Candidate	Votes	%	±%
Labor	Bill Nunn	9,213	36.3	−12.1
One Nation	David Dalgleish	8,584	33.8	+33.8
National	Scott McLay	6,968	27.4	−17.6
Democrats	Phil Rodhouse	325	1.3	−5.3
Greens	Bob Borsellino	314	1.2	+1.2
Total formal votes		25,404	99.0	+0.2
Informal votes		266	1.0	−0.2
Turnout		25,670	93.8	+1.0
Two-candidate-preferred result
One Nation	David Dalgleish	13,027	55.3	+55.3
Labor	Bill Nunn	10,540	44.7	−7.2
One Nation gain from Labor		Swing	+55.3	

=== Hinchinbrook ===
1998 Queensland state election: Hinchinbrook
Party	Candidate	Votes	%	±%
National	Marc Rowell	7,675	36.7	−26.1
One Nation	John Wyllie	6,172	29.5	+29.5
Labor	Richard Barkas	6,008	28.7	−4.8
Australia First	Teresa Roveda	1,078	5.1	+5.1
Total formal votes		20,933	98.7	+0.2
Informal votes		284	1.3	−0.2
Turnout		21,217	93.6	+1.9
Two-candidate-preferred result
National	Marc Rowell	10,975	58.6	−6.2
One Nation	John Wyllie	7,766	41.4	+41.4
National hold		Swing	−6.2	

=== Inala ===
1998 Queensland state election: Inala
Party	Candidate	Votes	%	±%
Labor	Henry Palaszczuk	12,748	67.1	−1.8
Liberal	Philip Greenaway	3,253	17.1	−14.0
Democrats	Lin Dengate	1,618	8.5	+5.8
Greens	Lenore Taylor	1,020	5.4	+5.4
Independent	Xuan Nguyen	373	2.0	+2.0
Total formal votes		19,012	96.6	−0.4
Informal votes		674	3.4	+0.4
Turnout		19,686	92.8	−1.4
Two-party-preferred result
Labor	Henry Palaszczuk	14,015	77.4	+8.5
Liberal	Philip Greenaway	4,094	22.6	−8.5
Labor hold		Swing	+8.5	

=== Indooroopilly ===
1998 Queensland state election: Indooroopilly
Party	Candidate	Votes	%	±%
Liberal	Denver Beanland	9,482	45.0	−11.1
Labor	Anne Stuart	7,908	37.6	+9.3
Greens	Drew Hutton	2,049	9.7	+0.8
Democrats	Mary McIntyre	1,618	7.7	+1.0
Total formal votes		21,057	98.7	−0.3
Informal votes		270	1.3	+0.3
Turnout		21,327	91.1	+0.8
Two-party-preferred result
Liberal	Denver Beanland	10,412	50.7	−12.6
Labor	Anne Stuart	10,137	49.3	+12.6
Liberal hold		Swing	+12.6	

=== Ipswich ===
1998 Queensland state election: Ipswich
Party	Candidate	Votes	%	±%
Labor	David Hamill	9,601	45.8	−5.9
One Nation	Heather Hill	8,281	39.5	+39.5
Liberal	Steve Wilson	2,207	10.5	−27.9
Greens	Desiree Mahoney	666	3.2	−4.2
Reform	Peter Morris	194	0.9	+0.9
Total formal votes		20,949	98.5	+0.5
Informal votes		315	1.5	−0.5
Turnout		21,264	94.1	+0.9
Two-candidate-preferred result
Labor	David Hamill	10,690	53.4	−3.0
One Nation	Heather Hill	9,323	46.6	+46.6
Labor hold		Swing	−3.0	

=== Ipswich West ===
1998 Queensland state election: Ipswich West
Party	Candidate	Votes	%	±%
Labor	Don Livingstone	9,658	41.9	−8.9
One Nation	Jack Paff	8,900	38.6	+38.6
National	Sue Wykes	4,065	17.6	−17.7
Reform	Lance Schloss	416	1.8	+1.8
Total formal votes		23,039	98.8	+1.0
Informal votes		291	1.2	−1.0
Turnout		23,330	95.0	+1.1
Two-candidate-preferred result
One Nation	Jack Paff	11,444	51.9	+51.9
Labor	Don Livingstone	10,626	48.1	−7.3
One Nation gain from Labor		Swing	+51.9	

=== Kallangur ===
1998 Queensland state election: Kallangur
Party	Candidate	Votes	%	±%
Labor	Ken Hayward	12,797	42.7	−5.4
One Nation	Boyd Nimmo	8,077	26.9	+26.9
Liberal	Scott Driscoll	6,583	22.0	−14.3
Christian Democrats	Howard Shepherd	1,265	4.2	+4.2
Greens	Noel Hoffman	898	3.0	−6.8
Reform	Allan Taylor	198	0.7	+0.7
Independent	Peter Birt	166	0.6	+0.6
Total formal votes		29,984	98.3	+0.5
Informal votes		528	1.7	−0.5
Turnout		30,512	93.7	+0.9
Two-candidate-preferred result
Labor	Ken Hayward	14,745	53.9	−0.1
One Nation	Boyd Nimmo	12,608	46.1	+46.1
Labor hold		Swing	−0.1	

=== Kedron ===
1998 Queensland state election: Kedron
Party	Candidate	Votes	%	±%
Labor	Paul Braddy	9,561	52.31	−6.88
Liberal	Cynthia Harris	4,699	25.71	−15.10
One Nation	Joan Gordon	2,661	14.56	+14.56
Democrats	Elizabeth Rowland	910	4.98	+4.98
Independent	Kay Spence	448	2.45	+2.45
Total formal votes		18,279	98.34	+1.13
Informal votes		308	1.66	−1.13
Turnout		18,587	92.64	+0.96
Two-party-preferred result
Labor	Paul Braddy	11,003	64.07	+4.88
Liberal	Cynthia Harris	6,171	35.93	−4.88
Labor hold		Swing	+4.88	

=== Keppel ===
1998 Queensland state election: Keppel
Party	Candidate	Votes	%	±%
Labor	Bruce Saunders	8,134	32.0	−4.4
National	Vince Lester	7,582	29.8	−27.5
One Nation	Wendy McFarlane	5,430	21.3	+21.3
Independent	Glenda Mather	1,679	6.6	+6.6
Australia First	Rick Nagle	1,217	4.8	+4.8
Independent	Toni Hansen	849	3.3	+3.3
Democrats	Terry Clark	546	2.1	+2.1
Total formal votes		25,437	98.8	−0.1
Informal votes		312	1.2	+0.1
Turnout		25,749	93.7	+1.1
Two-party-preferred result
National	Vince Lester	11,932	53.6	−6.7
Labor	Bruce Saunders	10,330	46.4	+6.7
National hold		Swing	−6.7	

=== Kurwongbah ===
1998 Queensland state election: Kurwongbah
Party	Candidate	Votes	%	±%
Labor	Linda Lavarch	11,857	49.5	+4.5
Liberal	Justin Kerr	5,423	22.6	−9.8
One Nation	Kim Thistlethwaite	5,312	22.2	+22.2
Greens	Kim Pantano	1,371	5.7	−3.5
Total formal votes		23,963	98.5	−0.1
Informal votes		356	1.5	+0.1
Turnout		24,319	94.8	+1.8
Two-party-preferred result
Labor	Linda Lavarch	13,847	63.2	+7.3
Liberal	Justin Kerr	8,061	36.8	−7.3
Labor hold		Swing	+7.3	

=== Lockyer ===
1998 Queensland state election: Lockyer
Party	Candidate	Votes	%	±%
One Nation	Peter Prenzler	9,943	39.2	+39.2
National	Tony Fitzgerald	6,473	25.5	−41.1
Labor	Dan O'Brien	5,324	21.0	−5.8
Independent	Jim McDonald	2,768	10.9	+10.9
Reform	Tony Howard	680	2.7	+2.7
Shooters	Patricia Andrew	160	0.6	+0.6
Total formal votes		25,348	98.8	+0.4
Informal votes		296	1.2	−0.4
Turnout		25,644	94.7	+0.9
Two-candidate-preferred result
One Nation	Peter Prenzler	11,742	53.7	+53.7
National	Tony Fitzgerald	10,134	46.3	−24.5
One Nation gain from National		Swing	+53.7	

=== Logan ===
1998 Queensland state election: Logan
Party	Candidate	Votes	%	±%
Labor	John Mickel	12,353	49.0	−17.9
One Nation	Jan Dawson	7,202	28.6	+28.6
National	James Lister	3,695	14.7	−18.4
Independent	Russell Leneham	1,441	5.7	+5.7
Democrats	Alan Dickson	495	2.0	+2.0
Total formal votes		25,186	97.8	+0.6
Informal votes		563	2.2	−0.6
Turnout		25,749	92.9	+2.0
Two-candidate-preferred result
Labor	John Mickel	13,903	58.4	−8.5
One Nation	Jan Dawson	9,895	41.6	+41.6
Labor hold		Swing	−8.5	

=== Lytton ===
1998 Queensland state election: Lytton
Party	Candidate	Votes	%	±%
Labor	Paul Lucas	12,579	59.8	+3.6
Liberal	Tony Murphy	5,859	27.9	−7.1
Democrats	Marianne Dickie	1,385	6.6	+6.6
Greens	Rob Wilson	1,207	5.7	−3.1
Total formal votes		21,030	97.5	−0.9
Informal votes		540	2.5	+0.9
Turnout		21,570	94.3	+1.3
Two-party-preferred result
Labor	Paul Lucas	13,730	67.4	+6.1
Liberal	Tony Murphy	6,626	32.6	−6.1
Labor hold		Swing	+6.1	

=== Mackay ===
1998 Queensland state election: Mackay
Party	Candidate	Votes	%	±%
Labor	Tim Mulherin	9,603	48.7	−3.8
One Nation	Barry Evans	5,323	27.0	+27.0
National	Marcella Massie	4,503	22.9	−16.1
Independent	Mike Ettridge	272	1.4	+1.4
Total formal votes		19,701	98.6	+0.6
Informal votes		279	1.4	−0.6
Turnout		19,980	93.3	+3.3
Two-candidate-preferred result
Labor	Tim Mulherin	10,536	56.5	+0.9
One Nation	Barry Evans	8,103	43.5	+43.5
Labor hold		Swing	+0.9	

=== Mansfield ===
1998 Queensland state election: Mansfield
Party	Candidate	Votes	%	±%
Labor	Phil Reeves	10,399	40.9	+2.2
Liberal	Frank Carroll	9,913	39.0	−12.9
One Nation	Michael Harris-Gahan	3,696	14.5	+14.5
Greens	Scott Alderson	817	3.2	−6.3
Democrats	Faye Carrington	625	2.5	+2.5
Total formal votes		25,450	98.8	+0.1
Informal votes		311	1.2	−0.1
Turnout		25,761	93.7	+0.6
Two-party-preferred result
Labor	Phil Reeves	12,205	50.2	+6.9
Liberal	Frank Carroll	12,122	49.8	−6.9
Labor gain from Liberal		Swing	+6.9	

=== Maroochydore ===
1998 Queensland state election: Maroochydore
Party	Candidate	Votes	%	±%
National	Fiona Simpson	9,426	40.3	−17.3
One Nation	Cheryl Parker	6,443	27.6	+27.6
Labor	Dan Siskind	5,635	24.1	−7.6
Greens	John Fitzgerald	1,157	5.0	−5.7
Democrats	Gaylene Bell	709	3.0	+3.0
Total formal votes		23,370	98.5	−0.1
Informal votes		345	1.5	+0.1
Turnout		23,715	90.7	+0.6
Two-candidate-preferred result
National	Fiona Simpson	13,695	65.1	+2.8
One Nation	Cheryl Parker	7,357	34.9	+34.9
National hold		Swing	+2.8	

=== Maryborough ===
1998 Queensland state election: Maryborough
Party	Candidate	Votes	%	±%
One Nation	John Kingston	8,539	42.6	+42.6
Labor	Bob Dollin	7,163	35.7	−10.7
National	Kev Mahoney	3,787	18.9	−26.1
Greens	Sue Russell	576	2.9	+2.9
Total formal votes		20,065	98.9	+0.2
Informal votes		232	1.1	−0.2
Turnout		20,297	95.1	+0.6
Two-candidate-preferred result
One Nation	John Kingston	11,126	58.3	+58.3
Labor	Bob Dollin	7,950	41.7	−8.7
One Nation gain from Labor		Swing	+58.3	

=== Merrimac ===
The results for Merrimac were:

1998 Queensland state election: Merrimac
Party	Candidate	Votes	%	±%
Liberal	Bob Quinn	11,093	49.1	−16.3
Labor	Robert Poole	6,405	28.4	−6.2
One Nation	John Fairfax	4,487	19.9	+19.9
Democrats	Colin O'Brien	601	2.7	+2.7
Total formal votes		22,586	98.2	+0.4
Informal votes		417	1.8	−0.4
Turnout		23,003	89.7	+1.7
Two-party-preferred result
Liberal	Bob Quinn	13,424	64.7	−0.7
Labor	Robert Poole	7,327	35.3	+0.7
Liberal hold		Swing	−0.7	

=== Mirani ===
1998 Queensland state election: Mirani
Party	Candidate	Votes	%	±%
Labor	Barry Gomersall	8,768	35.6	−3.3
National	Ted Malone	8,145	33.1	−22.9
One Nation	Edward Vaughan	7,054	28.7	+28.7
Australia First	Lawrence Hewitt	431	1.8	+1.8
Shooters	Steve Purtill	199	0.8	+0.8
Total formal votes		24,597	98.9	+0.4
Informal votes		265	1.1	−0.4
Turnout		24,862	94.2	+1.5
Two-party-preferred result
National	Ted Malone	11,528	52.7	−6.4
Labor	Barry Gomersall	10,348	47.3	+6.4
National hold		Swing	−6.4	

=== Moggill ===
1998 Queensland state election: Moggill
Party	Candidate	Votes	%	±%
Liberal	David Watson	12,202	53.3	−13.7
Labor	Laurie Lumsden	7,739	33.8	+0.7
Democrats	Kirsty Fraser	1,531	6.7	+6.7
Greens	Brett Sloan	1,436	6.3	+6.3
Total formal votes		22,908	98.6	+0.4
Informal votes		323	1.4	−0.4
Turnout		23,231	92.9	+0.7
Two-party-preferred result
Liberal	David Watson	13,117	58.9	−8.0
Labor	Laurie Lumsden	9,140	41.1	+8.0
Liberal hold		Swing	−8.0	

=== Mooloolah ===
The results for Moolooah were:

1998 Queensland state election: Mooloolah
Party	Candidate	Votes	%	±%
Liberal	Bruce Laming	12,121	46.7	−17.1
Labor	Marc Zande	6,222	24.0	−2.4
One Nation	Roy Schell	6,173	23.8	+23.8
Greens	Nicholas Redmond	1,432	5.5	−3.0
Total formal votes		25,948	98.6	+0.1
Informal votes		363	1.4	−0.1
Turnout		26,311	92.2	+1.4
Two-party-preferred result
Liberal	Bruce Laming	15,728	65.9	−3.4
Labor	Marc Zande	8,129	34.1	+3.4
Liberal hold		Swing	−3.4	

=== Mount Coot-tha ===
1998 Queensland state election: Mount Coot-tha
Party	Candidate	Votes	%	±%
Labor	Wendy Edmond	10,198	49.1	+10.3
Liberal	Rolene Orford	7,273	35.0	−2.0
Greens	Dick Copeman	2,107	10.1	−14.1
Democrats	Alison Jensen	1,199	5.8	+5.8
Total formal votes		20,777	98.6	−0.1
Informal votes		294	1.4	+0.1
Turnout		21,071	90.2	+2.1
Two-party-preferred result
Labor	Wendy Edmond	12,245	60.5	+7.0
Liberal	Rolene Orford	7,992	39.5	−7.0
Labor hold		Swing	+7.0	

=== Mount Gravatt ===
1998 Queensland state election: Mount Gravatt
Party	Candidate	Votes	%	±%
Labor	Judy Spence	9,053	48.0	−4.1
Liberal	Graham Quirk	6,047	32.1	−15.9
One Nation	Richard Duffell	2,519	13.4	+13.4
Greens	Rod Young	720	3.8	+3.8
Democrats	Ian Laing	455	2.4	+2.4
Reform	Arthur Colebrook	76	0.4	+0.4
Total formal votes		18,870	98.6	+0.7
Informal votes		267	1.4	−0.7
Turnout		19,137	93.1	+0.9
Two-party-preferred result
Labor	Judy Spence	10,332	57.2	+5.1
Liberal	Graham Quirk	7,739	42.8	−5.1
Labor hold		Swing	+5.1	

=== Mount Isa ===
1998 Queensland state election: Mount Isa
Party	Candidate	Votes	%	±%
Labor	Tony McGrady	7,562	58.5	−6.1
One Nation	Malcolm MacDonald	3,175	24.5	+24.5
National	Bill Baldwin	1,900	14.7	−13.9
Reform	Shirleen Webber	158	1.2	+1.2
Shooters	Ian Inglis	139	1.1	+1.1
Total formal votes		12,934	98.8	+0.3
Informal votes		156	1.2	−0.3
Turnout		13,090	89.2	+3.9
Two-candidate-preferred result
Labor	Tony McGrady	8,029	65.6	−3.1
One Nation	Malcolm MacDonald	4,207	34.4	+34.4
Labor hold		Swing	−3.1	

=== Mount Ommaney ===
1998 Queensland state election: Mount Ommaney
Party	Candidate	Votes	%	±%
Labor	Julie Attwood	9,030	39.3	−1.7
Liberal	Bob Harper	8,044	35.0	−11.6
One Nation	Allan Gregory	2,777	12.1	+12.1
Independent	Peter Pyke	1,692	7.4	+7.4
Greens	Helen King	785	3.4	−4.1
Democrats	Natalia Infield	456	2.0	−2.3
Independent	John Tiplady	193	0.8	+0.8
Total formal votes		22,977	98.9	+0.1
Informal votes		263	1.1	−0.1
Turnout		23,240	92.8	+0.2
Two-party-preferred result
Labor	Julie Attwood	11,348	51.9	+3.6
Liberal	Bob Harper	10,497	48.1	−3.6
Labor gain from Liberal		Swing	+3.6	

=== Mulgrave ===
1998 Queensland state election: Mulgrave
Party	Candidate	Votes	%	±%
Labor	Warren Pitt	8,464	37.0	−8.2
One Nation	Charles Rappolt	7,097	31.0	+31.0
National	Naomi Wilson	6,848	29.9	−16.0
Democrats	Jo Gallo	457	2.0	−1.4
Total formal votes		22,866	98.8	+0.4
Informal votes		281	1.2	−0.4
Turnout		23,147	92.9	+2.2
Two-candidate-preferred result
One Nation	Charles Rappolt	11,694	54.1	+54.1
Labor	Warren Pitt	9,903	45.9	−3.7
One Nation gain from National		Swing	+54.1	

=== Mundingburra ===
1998 Queensland state election: Mundingburra
Party	Candidate	Votes	%	±%
Labor	Lindy Nelson-Carr	8,756	44.7	+0.9
Liberal	Frank Tanti	6,011	30.7	−13.7
One Nation	Trevor Elson	4,807	24.6	+24.6
Total formal votes		19,574	98.3	−0.2
Informal votes		331	1.7	+0.2
Turnout		19,905	92.4	+3.8
Two-party-preferred result
Labor	Lindy Nelson-Carr	9,884	53.8	+3.8
Liberal	Frank Tanti	8,486	46.2	−3.8
Labor hold		Swing	+3.8	

=== Murrumba ===
1998 Queensland state election: Murrumba
Party	Candidate	Votes	%	±%
Labor	Dean Wells	10,266	45.9	−11.3
One Nation	Tony Cleaver	6,429	28.8	+28.8
Liberal	Susan Haskell	4,741	21.2	−21.6
Democrats	Peter Kennedy	658	2.9	+2.9
Reform	Mark Lewry	266	1.2	+1.2
Total formal votes		22,360	98.5	+0.9
Informal votes		339	1.5	−0.9
Turnout		22,699	93.7	+0.8
Two-candidate-preferred result
Labor	Dean Wells	11,639	55.0	−2.2
One Nation	Tony Cleaver	9,509	45.0	+45.0
Labor hold		Swing	−2.2	

=== Nerang ===
The results for Nerang were:

1998 Queensland state election: Nerang
Party	Candidate	Votes	%	±%
Liberal	Ray Connor	10,336	38.6	−19.2
Labor	Peter Burke	7,406	27.7	−3.6
One Nation	John Coyle	6,719	25.1	+25.1
Greens	Jacquie Hughes	1,572	5.9	−5.0
Democrats	Lynne Grimsey	569	2.1	+2.1
Reform	Richard Balcke	138	0.5	+0.5
Total formal votes		26,740	98.4	+0.1
Informal votes		432	1.6	−0.1
Turnout		27,172	91.2	+1.2
Two-party-preferred result
Liberal	Ray Connor	14,177	61.0	−2.6
Labor	Peter Burke	9,064	39.0	+2.6
Liberal hold		Swing	−2.6	

=== Nicklin ===
1998 Queensland state election: Nicklin
Party	Candidate	Votes	%	±%
National	Neil Turner	6,878	26.9	−30.9
Independent	Peter Wellington	6,562	25.6	+25.6
One Nation	Santo Ferraro	6,039	23.6	+23.6
Labor	Coleen Giles	5,426	21.2	−10.5
Democrats	Geoff Armstrong	695	2.7	−7.8
Total formal votes		25,600	98.8	+0.4
Informal votes		323	1.2	−0.4
Turnout		25,923	92.2	+1.5
Two-candidate-preferred result
Independent	Peter Wellington	12,159	55.7	+55.7
National	Neil Turner	9,657	44.3	−18.6
Independent gain from National		Swing	+55.7	

=== Noosa ===
1998 Queensland state election: Noosa
Party	Candidate	Votes	%	±%
Liberal	Bruce Davidson	11,932	45.3	−12.8
Labor	Don Sfiligoj	7,871	29.9	−7.3
One Nation	David Summers	3,767	14.3	+14.3
Greens	Peter Sykes	1,618	6.1	+6.1
Christian Democrats	Eddie Taylor	833	3.2	+3.2
Independent	Robert Logan	258	1.0	+1.0
Independent	John Jones	70	0.3	+0.3
Total formal votes		26,349	98.1	−0.4
Informal votes		510	1.9	+0.4
Turnout		26,859	90.7	+0.4
Two-party-preferred result
Liberal	Bruce Davidson	14,291	59.9	−1.4
Labor	Don Sfiligoj	9,585	40.1	+1.4
Liberal hold		Swing	−1.4	

=== Nudgee ===
1998 Queensland state election: Nudgee
Party	Candidate	Votes	%	±%
Labor	Neil Roberts	11,788	55.9	−4.8
Liberal	Paul Varley	4,750	22.5	−16.7
One Nation	Wayne Whitney	3,632	17.2	+17.2
Greens	Mike Stasse	734	3.5	+3.5
Reform	Keith Lane	172	0.8	+0.8
Total formal votes		21,076	98.6	+1.1
Informal votes		294	1.4	−1.1
Turnout		21,370	94.4	+1.4
Two-party-preferred result
Labor	Neil Roberts	13,289	67.4	+6.7
Liberal	Paul Varley	6,421	32.6	−6.7
Labor hold		Swing	+6.7	

=== Redcliffe ===
1998 Queensland state election: Redcliffe
Party	Candidate	Votes	%	±%
Labor	Ray Hollis	8,136	42.5	−2.1
Liberal	Allan Sutherland	5,864	30.6	−9.5
One Nation	Phil Knight	4,370	22.8	+22.8
Independent	Bill Turner	453	2.4	+2.4
Reform	Terry Fleming	324	1.7	+1.7
Total formal votes		19,147	98.5	+0.7
Informal votes		287	1.5	−0.7
Turnout		19,434	92.9	+1.4
Two-party-preferred result
Labor	Ray Hollis	9,349	52.3	+1.9
Liberal	Allan Sutherland	8,522	47.7	−1.9
Labor hold		Swing	+1.9	

=== Redlands ===
1998 Queensland state election: Redlands
Party	Candidate	Votes	%	±%
Labor	John Budd	10,226	38.5	−2.2
National	John Hegarty	8,703	32.8	−13.0
One Nation	June Woodward	6,234	23.5	+23.5
Democrats	Graham Jenkin	1,092	4.1	−4.5
Reform	Don Ruwoldt	302	1.1	+1.1
Total formal votes		26,557	98.5	+0.2
Informal votes		416	1.5	−0.2
Turnout		26,973	94.0	+1.0
Two-party-preferred result
National	John Hegarty	12,652	51.0	−3.6
Labor	John Budd	12,165	49.0	+3.6
National hold		Swing	−3.6	

=== Rockhampton ===
1998 Queensland state election: Rockhampton
Party	Candidate	Votes	%	±%
Labor	Robert Schwarten	9,690	50.9	−1.0
One Nation	Len Timms	4,919	25.9	+25.9
National	Karen Mackay	3,677	19.3	−18.6
Democrats	Fay Lawrence	740	3.9	−0.6
Total formal votes		19,026	98.6	+0.4
Informal votes		267	1.4	−0.4
Turnout		19,293	94.1	+2.0
Two-candidate-preferred result
Labor	Robert Schwarten	10,853	59.6	+3.2
One Nation	Len Timms	7,355	40.4	+40.4
Labor hold		Swing	+3.2	

=== Sandgate ===
1998 Queensland state election: Sandgate
Party	Candidate	Votes	%	±%
Labor	Gordon Nuttall	11,155	49.4	−6.6
Liberal	Don Young	4,546	20.1	−19.7
One Nation	Elizabeth Thurman	4,176	18.5	+18.5
Independent	Anne Hobbs	1,812	8.0	+8.0
Greens	Peter Burgoyne	631	2.8	+2.8
Reform	Fay Mills	243	1.1	+1.1
Total formal votes		22,563	98.5	+0.5
Informal votes		340	1.5	−0.5
Turnout		22,903	93.4	+0.8
Two-party-preferred result
Labor	Gordon Nuttall	13,272	66.0	+8.1
Liberal	Don Young	6,841	34.0	−8.1
Labor hold		Swing	+8.1	

=== South Brisbane ===
1998 Queensland state election: South Brisbane
Party	Candidate	Votes	%	±%
Labor	Anna Bligh	10,591	53.4	+2.2
Liberal	Leo Tsimpikas	5,209	26.3	−7.7
One Nation	Raymond Meiers	1,592	8.0	+8.0
Democrats	Anthony Lee	1,013	5.1	−3.7
Independent	Guy Freemarijuana	527	2.7	+2.7
Independent	Murray Swan	375	1.9	+1.9
Independent	Coral Wynter	278	1.4	+1.4
Australia First	Mario Zocchi	185	0.9	+0.9
Reform	Chris Ray	66	0.3	+0.3
Total formal votes		19,836	98.3	+1.3
Informal votes		351	1.7	−1.3
Turnout		20,187	90.0	+3.5
Two-party-preferred result
Labor	Anna Bligh	12,390	66.3	+5.6
Liberal	Leo Tsimpikas	6,300	33.7	−5.6
Labor hold		Swing	+5.6	

=== Southport ===
1998 Queensland state election: Southport
Party	Candidate	Votes	%	±%
National	Mick Veivers	9,000	39.0	−12.3
Labor	Peter Lawlor	8,429	36.5	−3.9
One Nation	Jay Nauss	4,907	21.3	+21.3
Democrats	John Huta	735	3.2	−2.1
Total formal votes		23,071	98.3	+0.3
Informal votes		399	1.7	−0.3
Turnout		23,470	91.0	+1.0
Two-party-preferred result
National	Mick Veivers	11,127	53.8	−1.1
Labor	Peter Lawlor	9,573	46.2	+1.1
National hold		Swing	−1.1	

=== Springwood ===
1998 Queensland state election: Springwood
Party	Candidate	Votes	%	±%
Labor	Grant Musgrove	7,047	38.2	+6.5
Liberal	Luke Woolmer	6,270	34.0	−3.9
One Nation	Neil Pitt	3,691	20.0	+20.0
Democrats	Paul Thomson	878	4.8	−13.8
Independent	Allan De Brenni	477	2.6	−1.0
Reform	Mark Mackintosh	62	0.3	+0.3
Total formal votes		18,425	98.6	+0.1
Informal votes		269	1.4	−0.1
Turnout		18,694	93.6	+1.3
Two-party-preferred result
Labor	Grant Musgrove	8,518	50.6	+11.3
Liberal	Luke Woolmer	8,327	49.4	−11.3
Labor gain from Liberal		Swing	+11.3	

=== Sunnybank ===
1998 Queensland state election: Sunnybank
Party	Candidate	Votes	%	±%
Labor	Stephen Robertson	12,691	47.5	+0.1
Liberal	Steven Huang	8,229	30.8	−15.1
One Nation	Ken Lock	4,646	17.4	+17.4
Greens	Andrew Grigg	1,172	4.4	+4.4
Total formal votes		26,738	98.5	+0.1
Informal votes		406	1.5	−0.1
Turnout		27,144	93.0	+0.1
Two-party-preferred result
Labor	Stephen Robertson	14,708	58.2	+6.8
Liberal	Steven Huang	10,572	41.8	−6.8
Labor hold		Swing	+6.8	

=== Surfers Paradise ===
1998 Queensland state election: Surfers Paradise
Party	Candidate	Votes	%	±%
National	Rob Borbidge	10,880	56.4	−10.9
Labor	Steve Axe	4,167	21.6	−3.5
One Nation	Phil Connolly	3,354	17.4	+17.4
Greens	Ray Schearer	894	4.6	+4.6
Total formal votes		19,295	98.3	−0.1
Informal votes		325	1.7	+0.1
Turnout		19,620	88.4	+2.0
Two-party-preferred result
National	Rob Borbidge	12,907	72.3	+0.5
Labor	Steve Axe	4,955	27.7	−0.5
National hold		Swing	+0.5	

=== Tablelands ===
1998 Queensland state election: Tablelands
Party	Candidate	Votes	%	±%
One Nation	Shaun Nelson	8,335	42.0	+42.0
National	Tom Gilmore	6,521	32.9	−36.5
Labor	Nigel Tucker	4,973	25.1	+0.6
Total formal votes		19,829	98.8	+0.5
Informal votes		230	1.2	−0.5
Turnout		20,059	92.6	+2.9
Two-candidate-preferred result
One Nation	Shaun Nelson	9,106	50.3	+50.3
National	Tom Gilmore	9,006	49.7	−23.3
One Nation gain from National		Swing	+50.3	

=== Thuringowa ===
1998 Queensland state election: Thuringowa
Party	Candidate	Votes	%	±%
Labor	Ken McElligott	8,976	35.1	−11.3
One Nation	Ken Turner	8,918	34.9	+34.9
Liberal	David Moore	4,430	17.3	+17.3
National	Ross Contarino	2,434	9.5	−34.6
Democrats	Annette Reed	518	2.0	−7.4
Independent	Lilian Malcolm	278	1.1	+1.1
Total formal votes		25,554	98.4	+0.3
Informal votes		405	1.6	−0.3
Turnout		25,959	93.4	+2.8
Two-candidate-preferred result
One Nation	Ken Turner	13,720	56.6	+56.6
Labor	Ken McElligott	10,508	43.4	−8.0
One Nation gain from Labor		Swing	+56.6	

=== Toowoomba North ===
1998 Queensland state election: Toowoomba North
Party	Candidate	Votes	%	±%
National	Graham Healy	7,678	39.8	−16.9
Labor	Kerry Shine	6,634	34.4	−4.0
One Nation	Ron Davy	4,654	24.1	+24.1
Reform	Barry Reid	319	1.7	+1.7
Total formal votes		19,285	98.9	+0.6
Informal votes		214	1.1	−0.6
Turnout		19,499	93.7	+1.0
Two-party-preferred result
National	Graham Healy	10,475	58.2	−1.4
Labor	Kerry Shine	7,522	41.8	+1.4
National hold		Swing	−1.4	

=== Toowoomba South ===
1998 Queensland state election: Toowoomba South
Party	Candidate	Votes	%	±%
National	Mike Horan	9,328	46.5	−19.8
Labor	Andrew Isfree	5,615	28.0	−5.7
One Nation	Darryl Shoesmith	4,748	23.7	+23.7
Reform	Andrew Chambers	357	1.8	+1.8
Total formal votes		20,048	98.9	+0.4
Informal votes		226	1.1	−0.4
Turnout		20,274	93.5	+1.6
Two-party-preferred result
National	Mike Horan	11,627	63.4	−2.9
Labor	Andrew Isfree	6,725	36.6	+2.9
National hold		Swing	−2.9	

=== Townsville ===
1998 Queensland state election: Townsville
Party	Candidate	Votes	%	±%
Labor	Mike Reynolds	8,948	44.6	+0.7
Liberal	Joy Rutledge	5,411	27.0	−15.2
One Nation	Ted Ive	4,948	24.7	+24.7
Independent	Billy Tait	430	2.1	+2.1
Reform	Steve McGuire	308	1.5	+1.5
Total formal votes		20,045	97.7	−0.4
Informal votes		471	2.3	+0.4
Turnout		20,516	90.2	+3.8
Two-party-preferred result
Labor	Mike Reynolds	10,360	57.7	+6.0
Liberal	Joy Rutledge	7,581	42.3	−6.0
Labor hold		Swing	+6.0	

=== Warrego ===
1998 Queensland state election: Warrego
Party	Candidate	Votes	%	±%
National	Howard Hobbs	5,550	42.0	−28.7
Labor	Elizabeth Pommer	3,287	24.9	−4.4
One Nation	Victor Espie	3,118	23.6	+23.6
Independent	Sandy Kidd	1,075	8.1	+8.1
Shooters	Bev Salisbury	186	1.4	+1.4
Total formal votes		13,216	98.7	+0.1
Informal votes		170	1.3	−0.1
Turnout		13,386	93.1	+1.6
Two-party-preferred result
National	Howard Hobbs	7,810	65.3	−5.4
Labor	Elizabeth Pommer	4,146	34.7	+5.4
National hold		Swing	−5.4	

=== Warwick ===
The results for Warwick were:

1998 Queensland state election: Warwick<
Party	Candidate	Votes	%	±%
National	Lawrence Springborg	9,443	45.9	−21.0
One Nation	Joan White	6,242	30.3	+30.3
Labor	Jeffrey Singleton	4,091	19.9	−8.0
Greens	Kim Olsen	814	4.0	−1.3
Total formal votes		20,590	98.7	−0.1
Informal votes		280	1.3	+0.1
Turnout		20,870	94.3	+0.7
Two-candidate-preferred result
National	Lawrence Springborg	11,628	61.8	−7.7
One Nation	Joan White	7,172	38.2	+38.2
National hold		Swing	−7.7	

=== Waterford ===
1998 Queensland state election: Waterford
Party	Candidate	Votes	%	±%
Labor	Tom Barton	10,494	46.2	−12.9
One Nation	Jim Hebbard	6,643	29.3	+29.3
Liberal	Aidan McLindon	5,571	24.5	−16.4
Total formal votes		22,708	98.3	+1.4
Informal votes		394	1.7	−1.4
Turnout		23,102	90.7	+2.6
Two-candidate-preferred result
Labor	Tom Barton	11,892	55.2	−3.9
One Nation	Jim Hebbard	9,647	44.8	+44.8
Labor hold		Swing	−3.9	

=== Western Downs ===
1998 Queensland state election: Western Downs
Party	Candidate	Votes	%	±%
National	Brian Littleproud	9,864	48.2	−31.2
One Nation	Peter McLaren	7,068	34.5	+34.5
Labor	Ron Lockwood	3,544	17.3	−3.3
Total formal votes		20,476	99.0	+0.2
Informal votes		217	1.0	−0.2
Turnout		20,693	94.3	+0.5
Two-candidate-preferred result
National	Brian Littleproud	11,428	59.4	−20.0
One Nation	Peter McLaren	7,805	40.6	+40.6
National hold		Swing	−20.0	

=== Whitsunday ===
1998 Queensland state election: Whitsunday
Party	Candidate	Votes	%	±%
Labor	Lorraine Bird	8,670	39.7	−4.9
One Nation	Harry Black	6,703	30.7	+30.7
National	Ian Roebuck	6,452	29.6	−15.7
Total formal votes		21,825	98.8	+0.3
Informal votes		256	1.2	−0.3
Turnout		22,081	93.1	+1.8
Two-candidate-preferred result
One Nation	Harry Black	10,607	51.7	+51.7
Labor	Lorraine Bird	9,896	48.3	−1.9
One Nation gain from Labor		Swing	+51.7	

=== Woodridge ===
1998 Queensland state election: Woodridge
Party	Candidate	Votes	%	±%
Labor	Bill D'Arcy	8,009	51.7	−9.9
One Nation	Leonce Kealy	4,401	28.4	+28.4
Liberal	Adam Young	2,169	14.0	−11.5
Democrats	Robert Hernandez	923	6.0	+6.0
Total formal votes		15,502	97.4	+0.5
Informal votes		410	2.6	−0.5
Turnout		15,912	90.5	+3.2
Two-candidate-preferred result
Labor	Bill D'Arcy	8,791	63.5	−4.6
One Nation	Leonce Kealy	5,048	36.5	+36.5
Labor hold		Swing	−4.6	

=== Yeronga ===
1998 Queensland state election: Yeronga
Party	Candidate	Votes	%	±%
Labor	Matt Foley	9,979	52.6	+1.7
Liberal	John Webster	5,323	28.1	−13.3
One Nation	Vanessa Pacitto	2,532	13.4	+13.4
Greens	Stephen Burchall	1,006	5.3	+5.3
Reform	Rick Stapleton	119	0.6	+0.6
Total formal votes		18,959	98.6	+0.4
Informal votes		274	1.4	−0.4
Turnout		19,233	92.8	+1.5
Two-party-preferred result
Labor	Matt Foley	11,218	62.5	+7.9
Liberal	John Webster	6,739	37.5	−7.9
Labor hold		Swing	+7.9	

== See also ==
- 1998 Queensland state election
- Members of the Queensland Legislative Assembly, 1995–1998
- Members of the Queensland Legislative Assembly, 1998–2001
- Candidates of the Queensland state election, 1998
