= Electoral results for the district of Kedron =

Queensland, Australia, district election results

This is a list of electoral results for the electoral district of Kedron in Queensland state elections.

== Members for Kedron ==
First incarnation (1950–1972)
Member	Party	Term
Bruce Pie	Liberal	1950–1951
Eric Lloyd	Labor	1951–1972
Second incarnation (1992–2001)
Member	Party	Term
Pat Comben	Labor	1992–1995
Paul Braddy	Labor	1995–2001

== Election results ==
=== Elections in the 1990s ===
1998 Queensland state election: Kedron
Party	Candidate	Votes	%	±%
Labor	Paul Braddy	9,561	52.31	−6.88
Liberal	Cynthia Harris	4,699	25.71	−15.10
One Nation	Joan Gordon	2,661	14.56	+14.56
Democrats	Elizabeth Rowland	910	4.98	+4.98
Independent	Kay Spence	448	2.45	+2.45
Total formal votes		18,279	98.34	+1.13
Informal votes		308	1.66	−1.13
Turnout		18,587	92.64	+0.96
Two-party-preferred result
Labor	Paul Braddy	11,003	64.07	+4.88
Liberal	Cynthia Harris	6,171	35.93	−4.88
Labor hold		Swing	+4.88	

1995 Queensland state election: Kedron
Party	Candidate	Votes	%	±%
Labor	Paul Braddy	10,360	59.19	+0.10
Liberal	Richard Schellbach	7,142	40.81	+21.40
Total formal votes		17,502	97.21	−0.53
Informal votes		503	2.79	+0.53
Turnout		18,005	91.68	+0.19
Labor hold		Swing	−7.1	

1992 Queensland state election: Kedron
Party	Candidate	Votes	%	±%
Labor	Pat Comben	11,139	59.1	−1.7
Liberal	Chris Buck	3,660	19.4	−7.6
National	Andrew Hassall	1,951	10.3	−0.3
Independent	Don Armstrong	1,073	5.7	+5.7
Greens	Richard Nielsen	1,029	5.5	+5.5
Total formal votes		18,852	97.7	
Informal votes		435	2.3	
Turnout		19,287	91.5	
Two-party-preferred result
Labor	Pat Comben	11,978	66.3	+3.9
Liberal	Chris Buck	6,102	33.7	−3.9
Labor hold		Swing	+3.9	

=== Elections in the 1960s ===
1969 Queensland state election: Kedron
Party	Candidate	Votes	%	±%
Labor	Eric Lloyd	7,732	59.9	−0.6
Liberal	William Battershill	4,014	31.1	+0.4
Queensland Labor	Gavan Duffy	1,157	9.0	+0.2
Total formal votes		12,903	98.5	0.0
Informal votes		200	1.5	0.0
Turnout		13,103	93.1	−1.7
Two-party-preferred result
Labor	Eric Lloyd	7,947	61.6	−0.3
Liberal	William Battershill	4,956	38.4	+0.3
Labor hold		Swing	−0.3	

1966 Queensland state election: Kedron
Party	Candidate	Votes	%	±%
Labor	Eric Lloyd	7,682	60.5	+2.1
Liberal	Christian Jesberg	3,901	30.7	+1.4
Queensland Labor	Edward Doherty	1,121	8.8	+1.3
Total formal votes		12,704	98.5	−0.1
Informal votes		188	1.5	+0.1
Turnout		12,892	94.8	−1.2
Two-party-preferred result
Labor	Eric Lloyd	7,859	61.9	−0.4
Liberal	Christian Jesberg	4,845	38.1	+0.4
Labor hold		Swing	−0.4	

1963 Queensland state election: Kedron
Party	Candidate	Votes	%	±%
Labor	Eric Lloyd	7,089	58.4	−2.4
Liberal	Hubertus Toonen	3,549	29.3	−0.1
Queensland Labor	Ted Doherty	906	7.5	+7.5
Independent	Ron Burrows	586	4.8	+4.8
Total formal votes		12,130	98.6	+0.2
Informal votes		172	1.4	−0.2
Turnout		12,302	96.0	+0.7
Two-party-preferred result
Labor	Eric Lloyd	7,551	62.3	
Liberal	Hubertus Toonen	4,579	37.7	
Labor hold		Swing	N/A	

1960 Queensland state election: Kedron
Party	Candidate	Votes	%	±%
Labor	Eric Lloyd	7,059	60.8	
Liberal	Ronald Burrows	3,412	29.4	
Independent	Harold Whitlock	1,133	9.8	
Total formal votes		11,604	98.4	
Informal votes		191	1.6	
Turnout		11,795	95.3	
Labor hold		Swing		

=== Elections in the 1950s ===
1957 Queensland state election: Kedron
Party	Candidate	Votes	%	±%
Labor	Eric Lloyd	8,410	42.6	−18.4
Liberal	Joseph Harris	7,119	36.1	−2.9
Queensland Labor	Clive Uhr	4,203	21.3	+21.3
Total formal votes		19,732	99.0	+0.2
Informal votes		203	1.0	−0.2
Turnout		19,935	95.9	+0.7
Labor hold		Swing	−6.8	

1956 Queensland state election: Kedron
Party	Candidate	Votes	%	±%
Labor	Eric Lloyd	11,283	61.0	−4.8
Liberal	Albert Johnson	7,215	39.0	+4.8
Total formal votes		18,498	98.8	−0.2
Informal votes		232	1.2	+0.2
Turnout		18,730	95.2	−0.5
Labor hold		Swing	−4.8	

1953 Queensland state election: Kedron
Party	Candidate	Votes	%	±%
Labor	Eric Lloyd	10,279	65.8	+17.8
Liberal	John Harris	5,351	34.2	−17.8
Total formal votes		15,630	99.0	−0.2
Informal votes		160	1.0	+0.2
Turnout		15,790	95.7	+0.8
Labor gain from Liberal		Swing	+17.8	

1951 Kedron state by-election
Party	Candidate	Votes	%	±%
Labor	Eric Lloyd	6,601	51.6	+3.6
Liberal	James Robertson	6,185	48.4	−3.6
Total formal votes		12,786	99.0	−0.2
Informal votes		127	1.0	+0.2
Turnout		12,913	91.2	−3.7
Labor gain from Liberal		Swing	+3.6	

1950 Queensland state election: Kedron
Party	Candidate	Votes	%	±%
Liberal	Bruce Pie	6,329	52.0	
Labor	Jim Hadley	5,830	48.0	
Total formal votes		12,159	99.2	
Informal votes		101	0.8	
Turnout		12,260	94.9	
Liberal hold		Swing		
