= Goss ministry =

Former government of Queensland, Australia

The Goss Ministry was a Ministry of the Government of Queensland, led by Labor Premier Wayne Goss. It commenced on 7 December 1989, five days after the Cooper Ministry, led by Premier Russell Cooper of the National Party, was defeated at the 1989 election. The Goss Ministry was followed by the Borbidge Ministry on 19 February 1996 following the loss by Labor of the Mundingburra by-election two weeks earlier, which deprived the Government of its majority.

== First Ministry ==
On 7 December 1989, a ministry of 18 cabinet ministers was sworn in. It served until the reconstitution of the Ministry on 16 December 1991 following the departure of Terry Mackenroth and Ken McElligott from the Ministry.

The list below is ordered by decreasing seniority within the Cabinet, as indicated by the Government Gazette and the Hansard index.

Office	Minister
Premier; Minister for Economic and Trade Development; Minister for the Arts; Minister for Police and Emergency Services (10–16 December 1991)	Wayne Goss, MP
Deputy Premier; Minister for Housing; Minister for Local Government; Minister for Health (10–16 December 1991)	Tom Burns, MP
Leader of the House; Minister for Police and Emergency Services	Terry Mackenroth, MP (until 10 December 1991)
Treasurer; Minister for Regional Development (until 12 November 1990)	Keith De Lacy, MP
Minister for Tourism; Minister for Sport; Minister for Racing	Bob Gibbs, MP
Minister for Transport; Minister assisting the Premier on Economic and Trade Development	David Hamill, MP
Minister for Employment; Minister for Training; Minister for Industrial Relations	Nev Warburton, MP
Minister for Resource Industries	Ken Vaughan, MP
Minister for Primary Industries	Ed Casey, MP
Minister for Health	Ken McElligott, MP (until 10 December 1991)
Minister for Education	Paul Braddy, MP
Minister for Environment and Heritage	Pat Comben, MP
Attorney-General	Dean Wells, MP
Minister for Family Services; Minister for Aboriginal and Islander Affairs	Anne Warner, MP
Minister for Justice; Minister for Corrective Services	Glen Milliner, MP
Minister for Administrative Services	Ron McLean, MP
Minister for Manufacturing and Commerce (until 4 June 1990); Minister for Manufacturing, Commerce and Small Business (4 June–12 November 1990); Minister for Business, Industry and Regional Development (from 12 November 1990)	Geoff Smith, MP
Minister for Land Management	Bill Eaton, MP

== First Ministry (reconstituted) ==
The following served from 16 December 1991 until the new Ministry was constituted on 24 September 1992 after the 1992 election:

Office	Minister
Premier; Minister for Economic and Trade Development; Minister for the Arts	Wayne Goss, LL.B., MP
Deputy Premier; Minister for Housing; Minister for Local Government	Tom Burns, MP
Leader of the House; Treasurer; Minister for Regional Development (until 12 November 1990)	Keith De Lacy, BA, Dip.Agric., MP
Minister for Tourism; Minister for Sport; Minister for Racing	Bob Gibbs, MP
Minister for Transport; Minister assisting the Premier on Economic and Trade Development	David Hamill, BA(Hons), MA(Oxon), FCIT, FAICD, MP
Minister for Police and Emergency Services	Nev Warburton, MP
Minister for Employment; Minister for Training; Minister for Industrial Relations	Ken Vaughan, MP
Minister for Primary Industries	Ed Casey, MP
Minister for Education	Paul Braddy, LL.B., MP
Minister for Environment and Heritage	Pat Comben, BA, MP
Attorney-General	Dean Wells, BA(Hons), MA, LL.B., MP
Minister for Family Services; Minister for Aboriginal and Islander Affairs	Anne Warner, MP
Minister for Justice; Minister for Corrective Services	Glen Milliner, MP
Minister for Administrative Services	Ron McLean, MP
Minister for Manufacturing and Commerce (until 4 June 1990); Minister for Manufacturing, Commerce and Small Business (4 June–12 November 1990); Minister for Business, Industry and Regional Development (from 12 November 1990)	Geoff Smith, MP
Minister for Land Management	Bill Eaton, MP
Minister for Health	Ken Hayward, BCom, Dip.Acctg., MP
Minister for Resource Industries	Tony McGrady, MP

== Second Ministry ==
On 24 September 1992, a ministry of 18 cabinet ministers was sworn in. It served until a major redistribution of portfolios on 21 February 1995.

The list below is ordered by decreasing seniority within the Cabinet, as indicated by the Government Gazette and the Hansard index.

Office	Minister
Premier; Minister for Economic and Trade Development	Wayne Goss, LL.B., MP
Deputy Premier Minister for Administrative Services (until 18 October 1993); Minister for Emergency Services (from 18 October 1993); Minister for Consumer Affairs (from 18 October 1993) Minister for Rural Communities (until 16 December 1994); Minister assisting the Premier on Rural Affairs (from 16 December 1994)	Tom Burns, MP
Leader of the House; Treasurer	Keith De Lacy, BA, Dip.Agric., MP
Minister for Tourism; Minister for Sport; Minister for Racing	Bob Gibbs, MP
Minister for Transport; Minister assisting the Premier on Economic and Trade Development	David Hamill, BA(Hons), MA(Oxon), FCIT, FAICD, MP
Minister for Primary Industries	Ed Casey, MP
Minister for Police and Emergency Services (until 18 October 1993); Minister for Police (from 18 October 1993); Minister for Corrective Services (from 18 October 1993)	Paul Braddy, LL.B., MP
Minister for Education	Pat Comben, BA, MP
Minister for Housing; Minister for Local Government; Minister for Planning; Minister for Rural Communities (from 16 December 1994)	Terry Mackenroth, MP
Attorney-General; Minister for Justice; Minister for the Arts	Dean Wells, BA(Hons), MA, LL.B., MP
Minister for Family Services; Minister for Aboriginal and Islander Affairs	Anne Warner, MP
Minister for Consumer Affairs (until 18 October 1993); Minister for Corrective Services (until 18 October 1993); Minister for Administrative Services (from 18 October 1993)	Glen Milliner, MP
Minister for Lands	Geoff Smith, MP
Minister for Health	Ken Hayward, MP
Minister for Minerals and Energy	Tony McGrady, MP
Minister for Employment; Minister for Training; Minister for Industrial Relations	Matt Foley, BA, BSW, LL.B.(Hons), MP
Minister for Business, Industry and Regional Development	Jim Elder, MP
Minister for Environment and Heritage	Molly Robson, MP

== Second Ministry (reconstructed) ==
On 21 February 1995, a reshuffle of portfolios took place after Pat Comben's departure from the ministry to resume his studies and enter the Anglican Church, with Warren Pitt being appointed in his place. The ministers below served until a new Ministry was constituted on 31 July 1995 following the 1995 election.

Office	Minister
Premier; Minister for Economic and Trade Development	Wayne Goss, LL.B., MP
Deputy Premier; Minister for Emergency Services; Minister for Consumer Affairs; Minister assisting the Premier on Rural Affairs	Tom Burns, MP
Leader of the House; Treasurer	Keith De Lacy, BA, Dip.Agric., MP
Minister for Tourism; Minister for Sport; Minister for Racing	Bob Gibbs, MP
Minister for Education	David Hamill, BA(Hons), MA(Oxon), FCIT, FAICD, MP
Minister for Primary Industries	Ed Casey, MP
Minister for Police; Minister for Corrective Services	Paul Braddy, LL.B., MP
Minister for Housing; Minister for Local Government; Minister for Planning; Minister for Rural Communities	Terry Mackenroth, MP
Attorney-General; Minister for Justice; Minister for the Arts	Dean Wells, BA(Hons), MA, LL.B., MP
Minister for Family Services; Minister for Aboriginal and Islander Affairs	Anne Warner, MP
Minister for Administrative Services	Glen Milliner, MP
Minister for Lands	Geoff Smith, MP
Minister for Transport; Minister assisting the Premier on Economic and Trade Development	Ken Hayward, MP
Minister for Minerals and Energy	Tony McGrady, MP
Minister for Employment; Minister for Training; Minister for Industrial Relations	Matt Foley, BA, BSW, LL.B.(Hons), MP
Minister for Health	Jim Elder, MP
Minister for Environment and Heritage	Molly Robson, MP
Minister for Business, Industry and Regional Development	Warren Pitt, MP

== Third Ministry ==
On 31 July 1995, a new ministry of 18 cabinet ministers was sworn in, returning Ken McElligott to the ministry and replacing four who had retired at the election. It served until the defeat of the Government in a vote of no-confidence on 19 February 1996 following the Mundingburra by-election.

Office	Minister
Premier; Minister for Economic and Trade Development	Wayne Goss, LL.B., MP
Deputy Premier; Minister for Tourism; Minister for Sport; Minister for Youth	Tom Burns, MP
Leader of the House; Treasurer	Keith De Lacy, BA, Dip.Agric., MP
Minister for Primary Industries; Minister for Racing	Bob Gibbs, MP
Minister for Housing; Minister for Local Government; Minister for Planning; Minister for Rural Communities; Minister for Provision of Infrastructure for Aboriginal and Torres Strait Islander Communities (from 12 December 1995:) Minister for Emergency Services Minister for Consumer Affairs	Terry Mackenroth, MP
Minister for Education	David Hamill, BA(Hons), MA(Oxon), FCIT, FAICD, MP
Minister for Transport; Minister assisting the Premier on Economic and Trade Development	Jim Elder, MP
Minister for Police; Minister for Corrective Services	Paul Braddy, LL.B., MP
Minister for Health	Peter Beattie, BA, LL.B., MA, MP
Attorney-General; Minister for Justice; Minister for Industrial Relations; Minister for the Arts	Matt Foley, BA, BSW, LL.B.(Hons), MP
Minister for Administrative Services	Glen Milliner, MP
Minister for Business, Industry and Regional Development	Ken Hayward, MP
Minister for Minerals and Energy	Tony McGrady, MP
Minister for Environment and Heritage	Tom Barton, MP
Minister for Employment and Training; Minister assisting the Premier on Public Service Matters	Wendy Edmond, DipRadiog, DipNuclMed, MP
Minister for Lands	Ken McElligott, MP
Minister for Family and Community Services; Minister assisting the Premier on the Status of Women	Margaret Woodgate, MP
Minister for Emergency Services; Minister for Consumer Affairs	Ken Davies, MP (until 12 December 1995)

Preceded by Cooper Ministry	Goss Ministry; 1989–1996	Succeeded by Borbidge Ministry
