= Borbidge ministry =

The Borbidge Ministry was a Ministry of the Government of Queensland, led by National Party Premier Rob Borbidge and his deputy, Liberal leader Joan Sheldon. It commenced on 19 February 1996 after the Goss Ministry, led by Premier Wayne Goss of the Labor Party, resigned following the loss of the Mundingburra by-election two weeks earlier. The Coalition party leaders were sworn in by the Governor of Queensland as a two-member cabinet. A week later, on 26 February 1996, they resigned so that a full ministry could be sworn in. The Borbidge Ministry was followed by the Beattie Ministry on 26 June 1998 upon the Government's defeat at the 1998 election.

== First Ministry ==
On 26 February 1996, a full ministry of 18 cabinet ministers (consisting of 12 Nationals and 6 Liberals) and 3 parliamentary secretaries was sworn in. It served until the end of the Ministry on 26 June 1998 following the 1998 election.

Blue entries indicate members of the Liberal Party.

Office	Minister
Premier	Rob Borbidge, MP
Deputy Premier; Treasurer; Minister for the Arts	Joan Sheldon, BPhysio, MP
Leader of the House	Tony FitzGerald, MP
Attorney-General; Minister for Justice	Denver Beanland, MP
Minister for Police and Corrective Services; Minister for Racing	Russell Cooper, MP
Minister for Health	Mike Horan, MP
Minister for Education	Bob Quinn, DipTeach, MP
Minister for Economic Development and Trade; Minister assisting the Premier	Doug Slack, MP
Minister for Small Business and Industry; Minister for Tourism	Bruce Davidson, MP
Minister for Environment and Heritage	Brian Littleproud, DipTeach, MP
Minister for Primary Industries; Minister for Fisheries and Forestry	Trevor Perrett, MP (until 13 February 1998); Marc Rowell, MP (from 16 February 1998)
Minister for Local Government and Planning	Di McCauley, BA, MP
Minister for Training; Minister for Industrial Relations	Santo Santoro, BA, BEcon(Hons), MP
Minister for Natural Resources	Howard Hobbs, MP (until 13 February 1998); Lawrence Springborg, MP (from 16 February 1998)
Minister for Transport; Minister for Main Roads	Vaughan Johnson, MP
Minister for Public Works and Housing	Ray Connor, MP (until 28 April 1997); Dr David Watson, BCom(Hons), AAUQ (Qld), MA, PhD, FCPA, FCA, MP (from 28 April 1997)
Minister for Emergency Services; Minister for Sport	Mick Veivers, MP
Minister for Families; Minister for Youth and Community Care	Kev Lingard, BEdSt, BA, AEd, MP (until 13 February 1998); Naomi Wilson, BEd, DipTeach, MP (from 16 February 1998)
Parliamentary Secretaries	Mark Stoneman; Tony Fitzgerald; Dr David Watson (until 28 April 1997); Bob Harper (from 8 May 1997); Naomi Wilson (until 16 February 1998); Graham Healy (from 16 February 1998)

Preceded by Goss Ministry	Borbidge Ministry; 1996–1998	Succeeded by Beattie Ministry
