= Manager of Opposition Business in the House (Queensland) =

The Manager of Opposition Business in the House, also known as the Leader of Opposition Business in the House, is a member of the Shadow Cabinet of Queensland responsible for working with the Leader of the House on the management and scheduling of business in the Legislative Assembly. The holder of the post is ex officio a member of the Committee of the Legislative Assembly unless the position is designated to another Opposition member. The Committee has responsibility for the way the body is run. The Leader of Opposition Business is one of the few Opposition members to receive a government salary in addition to that earned as a member of Parliament.

== List of officeholders ==
Notes

Name	Term began	Term ended	Party	Leader of the Opposition
Keith Wright	1978	1980	Labor	Tom Burns
Keith Wright	1978	1980	Labor	Ed Casey
Bill Prest	5 March 1981	20 October 1982 (Note: Despite the references to July 1982 in the biographies of Prest and Davis, no change regarding the Leader of Opposition Business was announced in August when Parliament first sat after a four-month recess. In addition, Wright replaced Casey as Leader of the Opposition on 20 October and announced he had appointed Davis the following day.)	Labor	Ed Casey
Brian Davis	20 October 1982	29 August 1984	Labor	Keith Wright
Bill Prest	29 August 1984 (Note: Warburton replaced Wright as Leader of the Opposition on 29 August 1984 and announced Prest as Leader of Opposition Business the same day.)	2 December 1989 (Note: Labor won the 1989 election on 2 December.)	Labor	Nev Warburton
Bill Prest	29 August 1984	2 December 1989	Labor	Wayne Goss
Kev Lingard	1 March 1990	19 September 1992	The Nationals	Russell Cooper
Kev Lingard	1 March 1990	19 September 1992	The Nationals	Rob Borbidge
Tony Fitzgerald	5 November 1992	19 February 1996 (Note: Following the Mundingburra by-election on 3 February 1996, the ALP and Coalition each had 44 members. On 19 February, Wayne Goss resigned as Premier and Borbide was sworn in his stead, following independent MP Liz Cunningham's decision to support the Coalition.)	National	Rob Borbidge
Terry Mackenroth	27 February 1996	19 May 1998	Labor	Peter Beattie
Denver Beanland	30 July 1998	17 February 2001	Liberal	Rob Borbidge
Kev Lingard	12 March 2001	29 January 2007	National	Mike Horan
Kev Lingard	12 March 2001	29 January 2007	National	Lawrence Springborg
Kev Lingard	12 March 2001	29 January 2007	National	Jeff Seeney (Note: Dates for Seeney, Langbroek, Gibson, and Menkens are taken from their parliamentary biographies, which are currently unavailable at the Parliamentary Library website because of the election.)
Stuart Copeland	29 January 2007	30 September 2008	National	Jeff Seeney
Stuart Copeland	29 January 2007	30 September 2008	National	Lawrence Springborg
John-Paul Langbroek	30 September 2008	21 March 2009	Liberal National	Lawrence Springborg
Jeff Seeney	6 April 2009	23 March 2011	Liberal National	John-Paul Langbroek
David Gibson	23 March 2011	11 April 2011	Liberal National	John-Paul Langbroek
Rosemary Menkens (Note: Menkens is the first Leader of Opposition Business to have received an additional salary for holding that office.)	11 April 2011	19 February 2012	Liberal National	Jeff Seeney (Opp); Campbell Newman (LNP) (Note: Newman as LNP leader appointed Menkens, but because Newman did not have a seat in Parliament, Seeney was Leader of the Opposition)
Curtis Pitt	19 April 2012	31 January 2015	Labor	Annastacia Palaszczuk
Ray Stevens	31 January 2015	9 May 2016	Liberal National	Lawrence Springborg
Jeff Seeney	9 May 2016	25 November 2017	Liberal National	Tim Nicholls
Jarrod Bleijie	15 December 2017	14 March 2022	Liberal National	Deb Frecklington; David Crisafulli
Andrew Powell	14 March 2022	1 October 2024	Liberal National	David Crisafulli
Mick de Brenni	8 November 2024	current	Labor	Steven Miles

== See also ==
- Manager of Government Business (Queensland)
- Manager of Opposition Business in the House (Australia)
- Leader of the House (Australia)
- Premier of Queensland
- Speaker of the Legislative Assembly of Queensland
- Government of Queensland
