= Leader of the House (Queensland) =

The Leader of the House, also known as the Manager of Government Business, is responsible for managing and scheduling Government business in the Legislative Assembly of Queensland. The office is held by a member of the Ministry; until 2009, the office was always held by a Cabinet minister, but Judy Spence held the office as parliamentary secretary. Under changes made in October 2011, the office was given a salary greater than its holder would otherwise earn by virtue of his or her other ministerial office. The Leader of the House is a senior government member of the Committee of the Legislative Assembly, which has responsibility for the efficient management of the Queensland Parliament.

== List of Leaders ==
Leader	Term began	Term ended	Party	Premier
Max Hodges	10 March 1975	13 August 1976	National	Joh Bjelke-Petersen
Tom Newbery	13 August 1976	8 August 1979	Country/National	Joh Bjelke-Petersen
Claude Wharton	August 1979	1 November 1986	National	Joh Bjelke-Petersen
Lin Powell	19 February 1987	1 December 1987	National	Joh Bjelke-Petersen
Brian Austin	8 March 1988 (Note: No biography of Austin is currently available from the Queensland Parliament, so his starting date is unclear. Austin was acting Leader of the House when the Legislative Assembly met on 2 December 1987, the day following Mike Ahern's toppling of Joh Bjeike-Petersen. Parliament was then adjourned to 8 March 1988, and Ahern's full ministry was appointed on 9 December. When the Legislative Assembly returned on 8 March, Austin was announced as Leader of the House.)	25 September 1989	National	Mike Ahern
Neville Harper	26 September 1989 (Note: Cooper installed his ministry on Sunday 25 September 1989, so it is unclear whether Harper was made Leader of the House that day or the following day, when Parliament next met and was informed of the appointment.)	2 December 1989 (Note: The Coalition lost the 1989 state election on 2 December.)	National	Russell Cooper
Terry Mackenroth	7 December 1989	10 December 1991	Labor	Wayne Goss
Paul Braddy	13 December 1991	25 August 1992	Labor	Wayne Goss
Terry Mackenroth	5 November 1992	19 February 1996	Labor	Wayne Goss
Tony FitzGerald	2 April 1996	19 May 1998	National	Rob Borbidge
Terry Mackenroth	29 June 1998	22 March 2001	Labor	Peter Beattie
Anna Bligh	22 March 2001	9 August 2005	Labor	Peter Beattie
Robert Schwarten	9 August 2005	22 April 2009	Labor	Peter Beattie
Robert Schwarten	9 August 2005	22 April 2009	Labor	Anna Bligh
Judy Spence (Note: Spence is the first Leader of the House to have held that post as a Parliamentary Secretary rather than as a Minister. She is also the first to have received an additional salary for being Leader of the House.)	22 April 2009	23 March 2012	Labor	Anna Bligh
Ray Stevens	17 May 2012	6 January 2015	Liberal National	Campbell Newman
Stirling Hinchliffe	24 March 2015	12 December 2017	Labor	Annastacia Palaszczuk; Steven Miles
Yvette D'Ath	12 December 2017	12 February 2024	Labor	Annastacia Palaszczuk; Steven Miles
Mick de Brenni	13 February 2024	1 October 2024	Labor	Annastacia Palaszczuk; Steven Miles
Christian Rowan	13 November 2024	Incumbent	Liberal National	David Crisafulli

== See also ==
- Leader of the House (Australia)
- Premier of Queensland
- Speaker of the Legislative Assembly of Queensland
- Manager of Opposition Business in the House (Queensland)
- Government of Queensland
