= Robert Schwarten =

Australian politician

The Honourable Rob Schwarten

Minister for Information and Communication Technology of Queensland
- In office 12 October 2006 – 21 February 2011
- Premier: Peter Beattie; Anna Bligh
- Preceded by: Chris Cummins
- Succeeded by: Simon Finn

Leader of the House of Queensland
- In office 28 July 2005 – 26 March 2009
- Premier: Peter Beattie; Anna Bligh
- Preceded by: Anna Bligh
- Succeeded by: Judy Spence

Minister for Racing of Queensland
- In office 12 February 2004 – 13 September 2006
- Premier: Peter Beattie
- Preceded by: Peter Beattie acting
- Succeeded by: Merged into Public Works

Minister for Public Works of Queensland
- In office 29 June 1998 – 21 February 2011
- Premier: Peter Beattie; Anna Bligh
- Preceded by: David Watson
- Succeeded by: Simon Finn

Minister for Housing of Queensland
- In office 29 June 1998 – 26 March 2009
- Premier: Peter Beattie; Anna Bligh
- Preceded by: David Watson
- Succeeded by: Karen Struthers

Shadow Minister for Public Works and Administrative Services
- In office 7 October 1997 – 29 June 1998
- Leader: Peter Beattie
- Preceded by: Lorraine Bird
- Succeeded by: Bruce Laming

Shadow Minister for Natural Resources
- In office 7 October 1997 – 29 June 1998
- Leader: Peter Beattie
- Preceded by: Henry Palaszczuk
- Succeeded by: Vince Lester

Shadow Minister for Primary Industries
- In office 17 December 1996 – 7 October 1997
- Leader: Peter Beattie
- Preceded by: Bob Gibbs
- Succeeded by: Henry Palaszczuk

Shadow Minister for Emergency Services
- In office 27 February 1996 – 17 December 1996
- Leader: Peter Beattie
- Preceded by: Brian Littleproud
- Succeeded by: Dean Wells

Shadow Minister for Rural Communities
- In office 27 February 1996 – 17 December 1996
- Leader: Peter Beattie
- Preceded by: Trevor Perrett
- Succeeded by: Henry Palaszczuk

Member of the Queensland Parliament for Rockhampton
- In office 15 July 1995 – 24 March 2012
- Preceded by: Paul Braddy
- Succeeded by: Bill Byrne

Member of the Queensland Parliament for Rockhampton North
- In office 2 December 1989 – 15 July 1995
- Preceded by: Les Yewdale
- Succeeded by: District abolished

Personal details
- Born: Robert Evan Schwarten; 6 October 1954 (age 72) Rockhampton, Queensland
- Party: Labor Party
- Spouse: Judith Ann Armstrong
- Children: 2
- Education: Rockhampton State High School
- Occupation: Teacher

Robert Evan Schwarten (born 6 October 1954) is an Australian politician.

== Early life ==
Schwarten was born in Rockhampton, and is married with two sons.

Before his entry into politics, he was a teacher and a ministerial advisor to the Deputy Premier.

== Political career ==
From 1985 to 1991 he was an alderman on Rockhampton City Council. A member of the Labor Party, he was elected to the Legislative Assembly of Queensland in 1989 as the member for Rockhampton North, however this seat was abolished in a redistribution ahead of the 1992 election. Schwarten contested the newly created seat of Keppel, but was defeated by Vince Lester of the National Party.

In 1995 he was reelected to parliament, this time as the member for Rockhampton. He was Minister for Public Works and Information and Communication Technology in Anna Bligh's Labor Government. He held the Public Works portfolio from 1998 to 2011. Schwarten stood down from Parliament and was replaced by Bill Byrne, who held the seat for Labor.

== Incidents ==
=== 2000 Labour Day incident ===
Schwarten drew national media attention when he was involved in a violent scuffle with Craig Brown, the husband of Federal MP Kirsten Livermore, following Rockhampton's Labour Day celebrations in May 2000. Brown lodged a formal complaint with the Queensland Police Service alleging assault occasioning bodily harm, but the complaint was later withdrawn. Premier Peter Beattie described the altercation between Schwarten and Brown as a "robust debate at a Labour Day function". Following the incident, the state Labor government faced several days of the state opposition referring to the incident in Parliament Question Time, where the opposition alleged that the police were ready to charge Schwarten, but held off after learning that both Schwarten and Brown were due to meet with senior Australian Labor Party figures in an attempt to resolve the situation.

=== 2010 restaurant incident ===
In July 2010, it was reported that Schwarten had become involved in a verbal stoush with other diners at a Rockhampton restaurant. An unnamed customer had told media that Schwarten was swearing, shouting and threatening to fight other customers. However, Schwarten claimed he was provoked. He said while he and his wife Judy were sitting down to a meal, customers began being offensive, verbally attacking him, and upsetting his wife. Judy Schwarten said that she was upset at the incident and claimed her husband had gone over to shake hands with the customers but they shoved him away. The manager of the restaurant apologised to Schwarten following the incident.

=== 2012 ramming incident ===
In January 2012, 62 year-old Brian John Hillier was charged with three counts of wilful damage after he used his vehicle to deliberately ram the home of Robert Schwarten in the Rockhampton suburb of Park Avenue, and the office of Kirsten Livermore in the Rockhampton CBD. Earlier, Hiller had also rammed another private residence in what was believed to be a case of mistaken identity as the house was located next door to a home belonging to someone with the surname, Livermore.

Police told the Rockhampton Magistrates Court that they had found handwritten notes in Hiller's vehicle of addresses and markings on a street map. Police also said that discovered a litany of large, hand-written anti-government signage strewn along the front fence of Hiller's property at Rockyview, on the northern outskirts of Rockhampton. Hiller applied for bail on 27 January 2012, which the police prosecutor opposed as police believed Hillier may have confronted Schwarten and Livermore under the guise of political activism. The bail application was refused and Hiller was remanded in custody. Queensland Premier, Anna Bligh condemned the actions of the man saying that his behaviour had no place in Australian democracy.

== Post-Politics ==
Since retiring from parliament, Schwarten has regularly appeared in the media as a columnist and commentator. On 1 December 2023, the Courier-Mail published an opinion column from Schwarten suggesting Queensland Labor needed "a new model" of leader to replace Premier Annastacia Palaszczuk ahead of the 2024 Queensland state election, following poor polling. The column, described as "incendiary" by The Courier-Mail sparked speculation about Ms Palaszczuk's future, which culminated in her resignation on 10 December.

Political offices
Preceded by Anna Bligh	Leader of the House of the Legislative Assembly of Queensland; 2005-2009	Succeeded by Judy Spence
Parliament of Queensland
Preceded by Les Yewdale	Member for Rockhampton North; 1989–1992	District abolished
Preceded by Paul Braddy	Member for Rockhampton; 1995–2012	Succeeded by Bill Byrne
