= Paul Braddy =

Australian state politician

The Hon Paul Braddy

28th Deputy Premier of Queensland
- In office 22 November 2000 – 24 November 2000
- Premier: Peter Beattie
- Preceded by: Jim Elder
- Succeeded by: Terry Mackenroth

Minister for Employment, Training and Industrial Relations
- In office 29 June 1998 – 22 February 2001
- Premier: Peter Beattie
- Preceded by: Santo Santoro
- Succeeded by: Matt Foley

Shadow Minister for Employment, Training and Industrial Relations
- In office 27 February 1996 – 29 June 1998
- Leader: Peter Beattie
- Preceded by: Santo Santoro
- Succeeded by: Santo Santoro

Minister for Corrective Services
- In office 18 October 1993 – 19 February 1996
- Premier: Wayne Goss
- Preceded by: Glen Milliner
- Succeeded by: Russell Cooper

Minister for Emergency Services
- In office 24 September 1992 – 18 October 1993
- Premier: Wayne Goss
- Preceded by: Nev Warburton
- Succeeded by: Tom Burns

Minister for Police
- In office 24 September 1992 – 19 February 1996
- Premier: Wayne Goss
- Preceded by: Nev Warburton
- Succeeded by: Russell Cooper

Leader of the House
- In office 13 December 1991 – 25 August 1992
- Premier: Wayne Goss
- Preceded by: Terry Mackenroth
- Succeeded by: Terry Mackenroth

Minister for Education
- In office 7 December 1989 – 24 September 1992
- Premier: Wayne Goss
- Preceded by: Brian Littleproud
- Succeeded by: Pat Comben

Shadow Minister for Education and Youth
- In office June 1988 – 7 December 1989
- Leader: Wayne Goss
- Preceded by: David Hamill
- Succeeded by: Brian Littleproud

Member of the Queensland Legislative Assembly for Kedron
- In office 15 July 1995 – 17 February 2001
- Preceded by: Pat Comben
- Succeeded by: Seat abolished

Member of the Queensland Legislative Assembly for Rockhampton
- In office 16 February 1985 – 15 July 1995
- Preceded by: Keith Wright
- Succeeded by: Robert Schwarten

Personal details
- Born: 20 January 1939 (age 87) Brisbane, Queensland
- Party: Labor
- Spouse: Ellen McIntyre
- Education: Queensland University
- Occupation: Solicitor

Paul Joseph Braddy (born 20 January 1939) is an Australian state politician.

== Early life ==
He was a solicitor before entering politics and served as an alderman in the Rockhampton City Council for three years from 1979.

== Political career ==
He entered the Queensland Parliament at a by-election for Rockhampton in 1985. Braddy represented Rockhampton until 1995, when he changed to the seat of Kedron, where he remained the sitting member until his retirement. He was, at various times, Minister for Education, Minister for Police and Emergency Services and Minister for Police and Corrective Services in the Goss Labor Government, and Minister for Employment, Training and Industrial Relations under Peter Beattie. He was briefly Deputy Premier of Queensland following the resignation of Jim Elder and the appointment of Terry Mackenroth.

In 1999, Braddy announced his intended resignation from politics after his seat of Kedron was abolished. He said that he did not intend to contest the next state election.

Political offices
Preceded by Terry Mackenroth	Leader of the House of the Legislative Assembly of Queensland; 1991–1992	Succeeded by Terry Mackenroth
Parliament of Queensland
Preceded by Keith Wright	Member for Rockhampton; 1985–1995	Succeeded by Robert Schwarten
Preceded by Pat Comben	Member for Kedron; 1995–2001	Abolished
