= Electoral district of Kedron =

Former state electoral district of Queensland, Australia

Kedron Queensland—Legislative Assembly
- State: Queensland
- Dates current: 1950-1972, 1992-2001
- Namesake: Kedron, Queensland

Kedron was the name of two incarnations of an electoral district of the Legislative Assembly in the Australian state of Queensland.

Both districts were based in the northern suburbs of Brisbane and named for the suburb of Kedron. The first existed from 1950 to 1972 and the second from 1992 to 2001.

== Members for Kedron ==
First incarnation (1950–1972)
Member	Party	Term
Bruce Pie	Liberal	1950–1951
Eric Lloyd	Labor	1951–1972
Second incarnation (1992–2001)
Member	Party	Term
Pat Comben	Labor	1992–1995
Paul Braddy	Labor	1995–2001

== See also ==
- Electoral districts of Queensland
- Members of the Queensland Legislative Assembly by year
- Category:Members of the Queensland Legislative Assembly by name
