= Tony FitzGerald =

Manager of Government Business
- In office 2 April 1996 – 19 May 1998
- Premier: Rob Borbidge
- Preceded by: Terry Mackenroth
- Succeeded by: Terry Mackenroth

Leader of Opposition Business in the House
- In office 5 November 1992 – 2 April 1996
- Leader: Rob Borbidge
- Preceded by: Kev Lingard
- Succeeded by: Terry Mackenroth

Shadow Minister for Justice and Corrective Services
- In office 10 December 1991 – 5 November 1992
- Leader: Rob Borbidge
- Succeeded by: Denver Beanland (Justice); Brian Littleproud (Corrective Services)

Shadow Minister for Mines and Energy
- In office December 1989 – 10 December 1991
- Leader: Russell Cooper
- Preceded by: Ken Vaughan

Minister for Emergency Services and Administrative Services
- In office 25 September 1989 – 7 December 1989
- Premier: Russell Cooper
- Preceded by: Russell Cooper
- Succeeded by: Terry Mackenroth (Emergency Services); Ron McLean (Administrative Services)

Minister for Justice
- In office 6 September 1989 – 25 September 1989
- Premier: Mike Ahern
- Preceded by: Paul Clauson
- Succeeded by: Ian Henderson

Queensland Government Chief Whip
- In office 7 February 1987 – 6 September 1989
- Premier: Joh Bjelke-Petersen; Mike Ahern
- Succeeded by: Len Stephan

Member of the Queensland Legislative Assembly for Lockyer
- In office 29 November 1980 – 13 June 1998
- Preceded by: Tony Bourke
- Succeeded by: Peter Prenzler

Personal details
- Born: Andrew Anthony FitzGerald; 22 February 1940 (age 86) Gatton, Queensland, Australia
- Party: National Party
- Spouse: Patricia Bernadette Daly
- Education: Gatton Convent School
- Occupation: Farmer

Andrew Anthony FitzGerald (born 22 February 1940; Gatton, Queensland) is a former Queensland, Australia, National Party politician who served in the state's Legislative Assembly for Lockyer from 1980 to 1998.

== Political career ==
He was the Government Whip under Premiers Joh Bjelke-Petersen and Mike Ahern from 7 February 1987 to 31 August 1989, when Ahern promoted him to Minister of Justice. He served in that role until Russell Cooper won a leadership spill on 25 September of that year and moved Fitzgerald to Minister for Community Services and Minister for Emergency Services and Administrative Services, a role he served in until the Coalition lost power on 7 December 1989 after the 1989 election. He served as Shadow Minister for Mines and Energy under Cooper. Rob Borbidge made him Justice and Corrective Services spokesman after winning the leadership in December 1991. He was appointed Leader of Coalition Business in November 1992, in which capacity he served as Leader of the Opposition Business until February 1996, and Leader of the House until he lost his seat at the 1998 election.

Political offices
Preceded by Terry Mackenroth	Leader of the House of the Legislative Assembly of Queensland; 1996–1998	Succeeded by Terry Mackenroth
Parliament of Queensland
Preceded by Tony Bourke	Member for Lockyer; 1980–1998	Succeeded by Peter Prenzler
