= David Hamill =

Australian politician (born 1957)

The Honourable David Hamill AM

43rd Treasurer of Queensland
- In office 29 June 1998 – 21 February 2001
- Premier: Peter Beattie
- Preceded by: Joan Sheldon
- Succeeded by: Terry Mackenroth

Shadow Treasurer of Queensland
- In office 27 February 1996 – 26 June 1998
- Leader: Peter Beattie
- Preceded by: Joan Sheldon
- Succeeded by: David Watson

Minister for Education
- In office 21 February 1995 – 19 February 1996
- Premier: Wayne Goss
- Preceded by: Pat Comben
- Succeeded by: Bob Quinn

Minister for Transport
- In office 7 December 1989 – 21 February 1995
- Premier: Wayne Goss
- Preceded by: Yvonne Chapman
- Succeeded by: Ken Hayward

Shadow Minister for Transport
- In office 26 September 1988 – 7 December 1989
- Leader: Wayne Goss
- Preceded by: Eric Shaw

Member of the Queensland Legislative Assembly for Ipswich
- In office 22 October 1983 – 17 February 2001
- Preceded by: Llew Edwards
- Succeeded by: Rachel Nolan

Personal details
- Born: 18 September 1957 (age 69) Ipswich, Queensland
- Party: Labor
- Spouse: Patricia Evatt
- Children: 3
- Education: University of Queensland
- Occupation: Lecturer in political science, Research officer

David John Hamill AM (born 18 September 1957) is an Australian former politician who served in a number of positions, including Minister for Transport and Minister Assisting the Premier on Economic and Trade Development, Minister for Education and treasurer. He was elected to the Queensland Parliament as member for Ipswich in 1983 and held the seat until 2001. He was awarded a Centenary Medal in 2001 and in 2009 he made a Member of the General Division of the Order of Australia award.

== Early life ==
Prior to his election he had been a lecturer/tutor in political science at the University of Queensland and later a research officer with the then federal leader of the ALP and later, Governor General Bill Hayden.

Awarded the Queensland Rhodes Scholarship in 1979, David took a BA (Hons) from Queensland University and then an MA from Oxford.

He was president of the Ipswich Electorate Executive 1982–89. State president, Young Labor, 1978; president Oxley Federal Divisional Executive 1984–88; delegate to various committees, State Council, State Conference and national Conference.

== Political career ==
Elected on 22 October 1983 as the State Member for Ipswich following the retirement of Sir Llew Edwards. In Opposition between 1983 and 1989 he was variously Opposition Spokesperson on Family Services, Youth and Education.

From December 1989 until February 1996, he was a member of the Goss Labor Cabinet, initially as Minister for Transport and Minister Assisting the Premier on Economic and Trade Development, where he undertook fundamental reform of the transport system and particularly Queensland Rail, and then as Minister for Education. He served as Shadow Treasurer between 1996 and 1998, before becoming treasurer with the election of the Beattie Labor government. He held this position until his retirement from the parliament in 2001. In his role as Treasurer he represented Queensland in negotiations leading to the introduction of the Goods and Services Tax in Australia.

After retiring from Parliament, Hamill undertook a PhD degree at the University of Queensland, and published his research as a book The impact of the new tax system on Australian Federalism. He has served as a director or chairman of several corporations and NGOs including Prime Infrastructure Holdings, the Australian Red Cross Blood Service, Queensland Museum, the Senate of the University of Queensland and Regional Development Australia, Ipswich and West Moreton Inc. He is currently a director of Brookfield Infrastructure Partners LP and Brookfield Business Partners LP, and chairs the boards of the Gladstone Airport Corporation, UQ College and Ensham Workers' Entitlements Fund. He is also a member of the board of the Australian Red Cross Society.

== Community ==
Hamill was appointed (2004–2006) as both the Qld Chair of the Duke of Edinburgh's International Award – Australia and a national board director.

== Personal life ==
Married to Patricia Evatt, a great-niece of Dr H. V. Evatt, the former High Court Judge and Leader of the Federal Parliamentary Labor Party, they have three children.

Political offices
| Preceded by Joan Sheldon | Treasurer of Queensland; 1998–2001 | Succeeded by Terry Mackenroth |
Parliament of Queensland
| Preceded by Llew Edwards | Member for Ipswich; 1983–2001 | Succeeded by Rachel Nolan |
