= Howard Hobbs =

Australian politician

The Hon Howard Hobbs AM

Minister for Natural Resources of Queensland
- In office 26 February 1996 – 13 February 1998
- Premier: Rob Borbidge
- Preceded by: Tony McGrady (as Minister for Minerals and Energy)
- Succeeded by: Lawrence Springborg

Member of the Queensland Parliament for Warrego
- In office 1 November 1986 – 31 January 2015
- Preceded by: Neil Turner
- Succeeded by: Ann Leahy

Personal details
- Born: Howard William Thomas Hobbs; 22 January 1950 (age 76) Brisbane, Queensland, Australia
- Party: Liberal National Party
- Other political affiliations: National Party
- Occupation: Grazier

Howard William Thomas Hobbs (born 22 January 1950) is an Australian politician who represented the seat of Warrego in the Legislative Assembly of Queensland from 1 November 1986 until his retirement at the 31 January 2015 state election. He was a member of the National Party of Australia until the Queensland division merged with the Liberal party to form the Liberal National Party of Queensland.

In February 1996, Hobbs was appointed as the Minister for Natural Resources in the Borbidge government. He resigned two years later, after his wife alleged that her husband was travelling with a young female staff member with whom he was having "an intimate and unprofessional relationship". It was later revealed that the staff member was Ann Leahy, who succeeded Hobbs as the member for Warrego in 2015.

Hobbs was Shadow Minister for Local Government and Planning and for Communities from 28 September 2005 until the LNP entered government following the 2012 election. As the longest-serving member of the Legislative Assembly, he presides at the election of Speakers. When he did so in 2009, Dean Wells equalled him in seniority, but Hobbs had taken the oath first because his name came first alphabetically, so he took the chair as Presiding Member. After Wells lost his seat at the 2012 election, Hobbs was the longest-serving member until his retirement at the 2015 state election.

Hobbs was appointed a Member of the Order of Australia in the 2026 King's Birthday Honours in recognition of his "significant service to the people and Parliament of Queensland, and to the community".

== Prior to parliament ==
- Chairman, Tambo Shire Council, 1980–1987
- Tambo Shire Shire Councillor 1975–1980
- Served in 49 RQR (Royal Queensland Regiment) at Wacol

== Personal life ==
Hobbs has two children.

Parliament of Queensland
Preceded by Neil Turner	Member for Warrego; 1986–2015	Succeeded by Ann Leahy
