= Pat Comben =

Australian politician

The Hon Pat Comben

Member of the Queensland Legislative Assembly for Windsor
- In office 22 October 1983 – 19 September 1992
- Preceded by: Bob Moore
- Succeeded by: Seat abolished

Member of the Queensland Legislative Assembly for Kedron
- In office 19 September 1992 – 15 July 1995
- Preceded by: New seat
- Succeeded by: Paul Braddy

Personal details
- Born: 3 May 1950 (age 76) Weymouth, Dorset, England
- Party: Labor
- Occupation: Labourer, Stockman, Law clerk

Patrick Comben AM (born 3 May 1950) is a former Australian politician and defrocked Anglican clergyman.

== Early life and education ==
Comben was born in Weymouth in Dorset and was raised on the Isle of Portland, Dorset, attending the Portland Secondary Modern School. He later said his home life "wasn't good" and he had run away from home. Leaving school at 16, he migrated by himself to Australia where worked initially as a farm hand, labourer and stockman. He was involved in an industrial accident while working in mining, and used the compensation to study for his Higher School Certificate. Attending night school as a mature aged student, he matriculated and attended the University of Queensland studying law and government, eventually graduating with a Bachelor of Arts. While at university, he became involved in the Queensland Labor Party.

== Political career ==
In 1983 Comben was elected to the Queensland Legislative Assembly as the Labor member for Windsor. In 1986 he was appointed Opposition Spokesperson on the Environment, Administrative Services and Corrective Services; in 1987 he was moved to Health and Environment, with Conservation added in 1988. When the Goss Labor government came to power in 1989 he was appointed Minister for Environment and Heritage, and in 1992 he was promoted to Minister for Education.

The electorate of Windsor was abolished in the 1992 redistribution and Comben transferred to Kedron in 1992, retiring from parliament in 1995.

In 2025, Comben published a book about Australian federal Opposition Leader Peter Dutton called Dutton Deconstructed.

== Church career ==
In 1999 he was ordained by Archbishop Peter Hollingworth as an honorary deacon of the Anglican Church, and sat on Clarence Valley Council from 2008 to 2012.

When Comben was registrar of the Grafton, New South Wales, diocese in the 2000s, he was central to handling a group claim from people who had suffered abuse in a NSW Anglican children's home in Lismore, New South Wales. It was alleged at a November 2013 session of the Royal Commission into Institutional Responses to Child Sexual Abuse that Comben had been more concerned about the finances of the diocese than the welfare of the many people who had been abused. Appearing at a subsequent session of the commission, Comben said he had recently signed papers relinquishing holy orders because "some members of the church were trying to rewrite history". He told the commission that he took the stance he did because he thought the lawyer for the claimants was bullying, and because others in the diocese told him there had never been any problems at the home. He now realised that the approach he took was wrong.

In July 2015, the Professional Standards Board of the Anglican church stripped Mr Comben of his holy orders but in 2017, he was restored after a church review process. The church undertook another investigation and hearing in 2025, with an independent review recommending he be deposed from holy orders, ending his ability to exercise ordained ministry with the outcome recorded on a national register. Comben sought a review of the decision, arguing he had been denied natural justice. In September 2026, in recommendation from an independent reviewed, the Bishop of Grafton Murray Harvey dismissed this application and announced Comben had been deposed.

== Awards and honours ==
On 26 January 2008, Comben was made a Member of the Order of Australia for "service to the Parliament of Queensland, to the Anglican Church of Australia, and to the community through a range of environmental, heritage and social welfare organisations."

== Personal life ==
Comben married Lynette Rose Rive in 1981. Her illness with breast cancer led to his retirement from politics in 1995; she died in 2008.

Parliament of Queensland
Preceded by Bob Moore	Member for Windsor; 1983–1992	Abolished
New seat	Member for Kedron; 1992–1995	Succeeded by Paul Braddy
