= Terry Mackenroth =

Australian politician (1949–2018)

The Honourable Terry Mackenroth

29th Deputy Premier of Queensland
- In office 30 November 2000 – 28 July 2005
- Premier: Peter Beattie
- Preceded by: Paul Braddy
- Succeeded by: Anna Bligh

44th Treasurer of Queensland
- In office 22 February 2001 – 25 July 2005
- Premier: Peter Beattie
- Preceded by: David Hamill
- Succeeded by: Peter Beattie

Deputy Leader of the Labor Party in Queensland
- In office 30 November 2000 – 28 July 2005
- Leader: Peter Beattie
- Preceded by: Jim Elder
- Succeeded by: Anna Bligh

Leader of the House
- In office 29 June 1998 – 22 March 2001
- Premier: Peter Beattie
- Preceded by: Tony FitzGerald
- Succeeded by: Anna Bligh
- In office 25 August 1992 – 19 February 1996
- Premier: Wayne Goss
- Preceded by: Paul Braddy
- Succeeded by: Tony FitzGerald
- In office 7 December 1989 – 10 December 1991
- Premier: Wayne Goss
- Preceded by: Neville Harper
- Succeeded by: Paul Braddy

Manager of Opposition Business in Queensland
- In office 19 February 1996 – 29 June 1998
- Leader: Peter Beattie
- Preceded by: Tony FitzGerald
- Succeeded by: Denver Beanland

Member of the Queensland Legislative Assembly for Chatsworth
- In office 12 November 1977 – 25 July 2005
- Preceded by: Bill Hewitt
- Succeeded by: Michael Caltabiano

Personal details
- Born: Terence Michael Mackenroth; 16 July 1949 Brisbane, Queensland, Australia
- Died: 30 April 2018 (aged 68) South Brisbane, Queensland, Australia
- Party: Labor
- Occupation: Steel fabrication business owner

Terence Michael Mackenroth (16 July 1949 – 30 April 2018) was an Australian politician from Queensland, who was a member of the Labor Party. He served almost 28 years with a notable parliamentary service history and a number of ministerial roles including Treasurer and Deputy Premier.

== Early life ==
Prior to his entry into politics, Mackenroth was principal in a steel fabrication and building company.

== Political career ==
Mackenroth was first elected on 12 November 1977 in the southern Brisbane seat of Chatsworth.

Mackenroth was Minister for Police and Emergency Services and Leader of the House from 7 December 1989 to 10 December 1991, then Minister for Housing and Local Government until the Goss government lost power on 19 February 1996.

While in opposition, Mackenroth was Shadow Minister for Housing, Local Government and Planning, Communication and Information from 17 December 1996 to 26 June 1998.

On 3 November 1995, Mackenroth opened the first approved 3-story, multi residential timber-framed construction building project in Australia. This is now also the current residence of Dr Tim Winter.

After the ALP returned to power under Peter Beattie in 1998, Mackenroth returned to Ministerial rank, picking-up portfolios of Regional and Rural Communities (until 16 December 1999), Local Government and Planning (until 30 November 2000) and Communication and Information (until 22 February 2001).

Described favourably by Beattie as a "tough son-of-a-bitch", Mackenroth was made Deputy Premier on 30 November 2000 after the former deputy premier, Jim Elder, resigned from the party before he admitted to electoral fraud at a Criminal Justice Commission inquiry into electoral rorting. With the developing scandal, Beattie trusted Mackenroth to help him save the government. He was known as "The Fox" within government for his political intelligence and strategies.

On 22 February 2001, Mackenroth took on the position of Treasurer. He remained as Treasurer and Deputy Premier for over four years until his resignation from parliament on 25 July 2005.

== Post Politics ==
Mackenroth was appointed a director of the Queensland-based property development company Devine Limited on 29 September 2005.

After north Queensland was ravaged by Cyclone Larry on 20 March 2006, Mackenroth was appointed to help in the recovery of the region.

In April 2007 Mackenroth was appointed a panelist on the Local Government Reform Commission.

Mackenroth was an independent director at Queensland Rugby League and a former director of the Australian Rugby League. In November 2016, Mackenroth was appointed interim chairman of the Central Queensland Capras in Rockhampton following the resignation of Geoff Murphy. His role with the Capras was to assist with the transition process, restructure the club and help find a new board. He previously acted in a similar role at the Northern Pride in Cairns.

== Personal life ==
Mackenroth was married with two daughters Rachel and Jessica and four grandchildren Jordan, Jeremy, Emma and Jacob and was a qualified welder. He was a Roman Catholic.

Mackenroth died at Mater Private Hospital on 30 April 2018, aged 68 years, from a combination of a lung tumour and pneumonia, less than a fortnight after diagnosis of the lung tumour. Twenty years earlier he had been successfully treated for lung cancer.

Political offices
Preceded by Paul Braddy	Deputy Premier of Queensland; 2000–2005	Succeeded by Anna Bligh
Preceded by David Hamill	Treasurer of Queensland; 2001–2005	Succeeded by Peter Beattie
Preceded by Tony FitzGerald	Leader of the House of the Legislative Assembly of Queensland; 1998–2001	Succeeded by Anna Bligh
Preceded by Paul Braddy	Leader of the House of the Legislative Assembly of Queensland; 1992–1996	Succeeded by Tony FitzGerald
Preceded by Neville Harper	Leader of the House of the Legislative Assembly of Queensland; 1989–1991	Succeeded by Paul Braddy
Parliament of Queensland
Preceded by Bill Hewitt	Member for Chatsworth; 1977–2005	Succeeded by Michael Caltabiano
