= Tom Burns (Australian politician) =

Australian politician (1931–2007)

The Honourable Tom Burns AO

25th Deputy Premier of Queensland
- In office 7 December 1989 – 19 February 1996
- Premier: Wayne Goss
- Preceded by: Bill Gunn
- Succeeded by: Joan Sheldon

Deputy Leader of the Labor Party in Queensland
- In office 29 August 1984 – 19 February 1996
- Leader: Nev Warburton; Wayne Goss
- Preceded by: Nev Warburton
- Succeeded by: Jim Elder

Deputy Leader of the Opposition in Queensland
- In office 29 August 1984 – 7 December 1989
- Leader: Nev Warburton; Wayne Goss
- Preceded by: Nev Warburton
- Succeeded by: Rob Borbidge

Leader of the Opposition in Queensland Leader of the Labor Party in Queensland Elections: 1977
- In office 19 December 1974 – 28 November 1978
- Deputy: Jack Melloy (1974–1976); Jack Houston (1976–1978)
- Preceded by: Perc Tucker
- Succeeded by: Ed Casey

Member of the Queensland Legislative Assembly for Lytton
- In office 27 May 1972 – 31 May 1996
- Preceded by: New seat
- Succeeded by: Paul Lucas

National President of the Labor Party
- In office August 1970 – 7 June 1973
- Preceded by: Jim Keeffe
- Succeeded by: Bob Hawke

Personal details
- Born: Thomas James Burns; 27 October 1931 Maryborough, Queensland, Australia
- Died: 4 June 2007 (aged 75) Brisbane, Queensland, Australia
- Party: Labor
- Spouse: Angela MacDonald
- Children: 3
- Education: Brisbane Grammar

Thomas James Burns AO (27 October 1931 – 4 June 2007) was an Australian politician who led the Labor Party (ALP) in Queensland between 1974 and 1978 and was Deputy Premier of Queensland between 1989 and 1996. He served as the Member for Lytton in the Parliament of Queensland between 1972 and 1996. Burns had previously served as the Federal President of Labor between 1970 and 1973, playing a key role in modernising the party prior to the election of Gough Whitlam as the Prime Minister of Australia in 1972.

== Early life and career ==
Tom Burns was born in Maryborough, Queensland in October 1931. After attending Brisbane Grammar School, he spent six years in the Royal Australian Air Force before becoming involved in politics.

Burns worked as an organiser for the Labor Party between 1960 and 1965 before his promotion to the position as Queensland State Secretary of the ALP. As State Secretary, he played a critical role in persuading the Queensland delegates to the National Executive to vote against the expulsion of Whitlam from the ALP in 1966.

Senior people wanted Burns to become the National Secretary of the Australian Labor Party in 1969 where he would run the party's campaign in the 1969 Federal election. When he was reluctant, Mick Young was appointed as the National Secretary.

He was elected as the National President of the ALP in 1970. Burns was heavily involved in Federal intervention in the New South Wales and Victorian branches, conducting a report into the affairs of the NSW Branch and taking over administrative responsibility with Young for the Victorian Branch. His report on the NSW Branch was critical of the running of the 1968 preselection of Paul Keating as the candidate for the Division of Blaxland. The Federal intervention into the Victorian and NSW branches was a critical factor in Labor's success in the 1972 Federal election.

== Parliamentary career ==
At the 1972 Queensland election, Burns was elected as the member for Lytton, which is a safe Labor seat. He took over the leadership of the Queensland branch of the Labor Party in 1974 after Labor was reduced to a "cricket team" of 11 members. Burns managed to gain 12 seats in the 1977 election but the Coalition continued to enjoy a healthy majority. He resigned as leader of the Labor Party in 1978.

In 1984, Burns was elected as Deputy Leader of the ALP with Nev Warburton as Leader. He retained the Deputy Leadership when Wayne Goss became the leader, and served as Deputy Premier between 1989 and 1996, holding a variety of ministerial portfolios. Burns retired from the Deputy Leadership and from the Parliament in 1996.

== Later years ==
Burns remained active in public life after his retirement from politics. He had a long-term interest in China having been a member of the first Australian delegation to China in the 1970s led by Gough Whitlam. In July 1999, the Beattie Government appointed him as Chair of the Queensland-China Council and he was made an Officer of the Order of Australia in 2001 for his contribution to Australia's relationship with China.

Burns died in June 2007, aged 75.

Political offices
Preceded by Bill Gunn	Deputy Premier of Queensland; 1989–1996	Succeeded by Joan Sheldon
Preceded by Perc Tucker	Leader of the Opposition of Queensland; 1974–1978	Succeeded by Ed Casey
Parliament of Queensland
New seat	Member for Lytton; 1972–1996	Succeeded by Paul Lucas
