= Brian Littleproud =

Australian politician (born 1941)

The Honourable Brian Littleproud

Deputy Leader of the National Party in Queensland
- In office 10 December 1991 – 29 September 1992
- Leader: Rob Borbidge
- Preceded by: Rob Borbidge
- Succeeded by: Kev Lingard

Member of the Queensland Legislative Assembly
- In office 22 October 1983 – 17 February 2001
- Preceded by: Vic Sullivan
- Succeeded by: Seat abolished
- Constituency: Condamine (1983–1992); Western Downs (1992–2001)

Personal details
- Born: Brian George Littleproud; 25 June 1941 (age 85) Chinchilla, Queensland, Australia
- Party: National
- Children: David Littleproud
- Occupation: Grazier; Teacher; Politician

Brian George Littleproud (born 25 June 1941) is an Australian former politician. He was a National Party member of the Legislative Assembly of Queensland from 1983 to 2001, representing Condamine until 1992 and Western Downs thereafter.

Littleproud was born in Chinchilla, Queensland, and was a teacher and farmer before becoming involved in politics. Elected during the Bjelke-Petersen National Party government, he was a backbencher until December 1987, when he became Minister for Education, Youth and Sport. Following Labor's win at the 1989 state election, he remained on the National Party's front bench and was Deputy Leader from 1991 to 1992. Following the Coalition's return to government in 1996, he became Minister for Environment, serving until 1998 when Labor returned to office. Littleproud retired in 2001.

His son, David Littleproud, was the federal leader of the National Party from 2022 to 2026.

Parliament of Queensland
Preceded by Vic Sullivan	Member for Condamine; 1983–1992	District abolished
New seat	Member for Western Downs; 1992–2001	District abolished
