= Results of the 1989 Queensland state election =

Queensland state election, 2 December 1989 Legislative Assembly << 1986–1992 >>
Enrolled voters	1,780,785				
Votes cast	1,623,637		Turnout	91.18%	–0.07%
Informal votes	48,764		Informal	3.00%	+0.83%
Summary of votes by party
Party	Primary votes	%	Swing	Seats	Change
Labor	792,466	50.32%	+8.97%	54	+24
National	379,364	24.09%	–15.55%	27	–22
Liberal	331,562	21.05%	+4.55%	8	–2
Democrats	6,669	0.42%	–0.21%	0	±0
Citizens Electoral Council	6,610	0.42%	+0.42%	0	±0
Greens	5,206	0.33%	+0.33%	0	±0
Call to Australia	2,007	0.13%	+0.13%	0	±0
Grey Power	300	0.02%	+0.02%	0	±0
Independent	50,689	3.22%	+1.34%	0	±0
Total	1,574,873			89	

This is a list of electoral district results for the 1989 Queensland state election.

== Results by electoral district ==
=== Albert ===
1989 Queensland state election: Albert
Party	Candidate	Votes	%	±%
Labor	John Szczerbanik	10,511	42.5	+10.5
National	Ivan Gibbs	7,106	28.8	−20.3
Liberal	Kay Elson	6,690	27.1	+8.2
Advance Australia	John Ivory	404	1.6	+1.6
Total formal votes		24,711	97.1	−0.9
Informal votes		730	2.9	+0.9
Turnout		25,441	91.0	+0.6
Two-party-preferred result
Labor	John Szczerbanik	14,749	59.7	+22.8
National	Ivan Gibbs	9,962	40.3	−22.8
Labor gain from National		Swing	+22.8	

=== Archerfield ===
1989 Queensland state election: Archerfield
Party	Candidate	Votes	%	±%
Labor	Henry Palaszczuk	13,045	73.7	+11.4
Liberal	Gordon Morris	3,082	17.4	+1.0
National	Mark Goodin	1,571	8.9	−12.4
Total formal votes		17,698	95.1	−1.3
Informal votes		922	4.9	+1.3
Turnout		18,620	91.7	+1.0
Two-party-preferred result
Labor	Henry Palaszczuk	13,150	74.3	+7.4
Liberal	Gordon Morris	4,548	25.7	+25.7
Labor hold		Swing	+7.4	

=== Ashgrove ===
1989 Queensland state election: Ashgrove
Party	Candidate	Votes	%	±%
Labor	Jim Fouras	10,007	54.3	+9.6
Liberal	Alan Sherlock	6,296	34.2	+7.7
National	John Giles	1,263	6.9	−19.3
Independent	Stephen Woolcock	591	3.2	+3.2
Independent	Garry Renshaw	278	1.5	+1.5
Total formal votes		18,435	97.7	
Informal votes		441	2.3	
Turnout		18,876	91.4	
Two-party-preferred result
Labor	Jim Fouras	10,434	56.6	+8.6
Liberal	Alan Sherlock	8,001	43.4	−8.6
Labor gain from Liberal		Swing	+8.6	

=== Aspley ===
1989 Queensland state election: Aspley
Party	Candidate	Votes	%	±%
Labor	Noela Pemberton	9,130	46.4	+10.7
Liberal	John Goss	6,763	34.4	+5.0
National	Beryce Nelson	2,978	15.1	−16.2
Call to Australia	Eric Raetz	521	2.6	+2.6
Independent	Ian Webster	269	1.4	+1.4
Total formal votes		19,661	97.7	−0.6
Informal votes		470	2.3	+0.6
Turnout		20,131	93.3	+0.1
Two-party-preferred result
Liberal	John Goss	10,063	51.2	+51.2
Labor	Noela Pemberton	9,598	48.8	+2.9
Liberal gain from National		Swing	+51.2	

=== Auburn ===
1989 Queensland state election: Auburn
Party	Candidate	Votes	%	±%
National	Neville Harper	6,315	47.65	−16.39
Labor	Tom Hall	4,578	34.55	−1.41
Independent	Maurice Hetherington	2,359	17.80	+17.80
Total formal votes		13,252	98.08	+0.12
Informal votes		260	1.92	−0.12
Turnout		13,512	91.54	−1.22
Two-party-preferred result
National	Neville Harper	7,902	59.63	−4.41
Labor	Tom Hall	5,350	40.37	+4.41
National hold		Swing	−4.41	

=== Balonne ===
1989 Queensland state election: Balonne
Party	Candidate	Votes	%	±%
National	Don Neal	4,315	57.0	−17.1
Labor	Barrie Ryan	1,633	21.6	−4.3
Independent	John Ellem	932	12.3	+12.3
Independent	Allen Tinkler	687	9.1	+9.1
Total formal votes		7,567	97.0	−0.6
Informal votes		230	3.0	+0.6
Turnout		7,797	90.7	−0.6
Two-party-preferred result
National	Don Neal	5,592	73.9	−0.2
Labor	Barrie Ryan	1,975	26.1	+0.2
National hold		Swing	−0.2	

=== Barambah ===
1989 Queensland state election: Barambah
Party	Candidate	Votes	%	±%
National	Trevor Perrett	6,477	50.6	−26.9
Labor	John Lang	2,957	23.1	+0.6
Liberal	Bill Walters	1,733	13.6	+13.6
Citizens Electoral Council	Craig Isherwood	1,625	12.7	+12.7
Total formal votes		12,792	97.9	+0.6
Informal votes		273	2.1	−0.6
Turnout		13,065	92.9	−0.6
Two-party-preferred result
National	Trevor Perrett	9,133	71.4	−6.1
Labor	John Lang	3,659	28.6	+6.1
National hold		Swing	−6.1	

=== Barron River ===
1989 Queensland state election: Barron River
Party	Candidate	Votes	%	±%
Labor	Lesley Clark	10,421	55.0	+9.0
National	Peter Dunn	6,040	31.9	−22.1
Liberal	David Forehead	2,485	13.1	+13.1
Total formal votes		18,946	96.4	−1.2
Informal votes		705	3.6	+1.2
Turnout		19,651	87.9	−0.9
Two-party-preferred result
Labor	Lesley Clark	10,894	57.5	+11.5
National	Peter Dunn	8,052	42.5	−11.5
Labor gain from National		Swing	+11.5	

=== Bowen ===
1989 Queensland state election: Bowen
Party	Candidate	Votes	%	±%
Labor	Ken Smyth	7,386	68.1	+11.1
National	Trevor Maltby	2,598	23.9	−2.4
Independent	Josephine Cronin	869	8.0	+8.0
Total formal votes		10,853	97.6	−0.7
Informal votes		262	2.4	+0.7
Turnout		11,115	90.1	−1.9
Two-party-preferred result
Labor	Ken Smyth	7,662	70.6	+8.9
National	Trevor Maltby	3,191	29.4	−8.9
Labor hold		Swing	+8.9	

=== Brisbane Central ===
1989 Queensland state election: Brisbane Central
Party	Candidate	Votes	%	±%
Labor	Peter Beattie	10,823	64.7	+14.5
Liberal	John Peeters	3,452	20.6	+1.8
National	Justin Choveaux	1,599	9.7	−15.1
Greens	Ranald McDonald	860	5.1	+5.1
Total formal votes		16,734	96.4	+0.7
Informal votes		630	3.6	−0.7
Turnout		17,364	84.1	−1.5
Two-party-preferred result
Labor	Peter Beattie	11,413	68.2	+9.1
Liberal	John Peeters	5,321	31.8	−9.1
Labor hold		Swing	+9.1	

=== Broadsound ===
1989 Queensland state election: Broadsound
Party	Candidate	Votes	%	±%
Labor	Jim Pearce	6,170	45.3	+7.9
National	Denis Hinton	5,434	39.9	−2.3
Independent	James O'Brien	1,038	7.6	+7.6
Liberal	Howard Rodda	634	4.6	+4.6
Citizens Electoral Council	Leslie White	354	2.6	+2.6
Total formal votes		13,630	97.2	−0.8
Informal votes		397	2.8	+0.8
Turnout		14,027	92.2	+0.7
Two-party-preferred result
Labor	Jim Pearce	7,189	52.7	+4.7
National	Denis Hinton	6,441	47.3	−4.7
Labor gain from National		Swing	+4.7	

=== Bulimba ===
1989 Queensland state election: Bulimba
Party	Candidate	Votes	%	±%
Labor	Ron McLean	12,766	68.2	+10.0
Liberal	Alvan Hawkes	3,792	20.3	+3.0
National	Judith Brown	2,156	11.5	−13.0
Total formal votes		18,714	97.1	−1.0
Informal votes		567	2.9	+1.0
Turnout		19,281	90.9	−0.1
Two-party-preferred result
Labor	Ron McLean	12,913	69.0	+6.0
Liberal	Alvan Hawkes	5,801	31.0	+31.0
Labor hold		Swing	+6.0	

=== Bundaberg ===
1989 Queensland state election: Bundaberg
Party	Candidate	Votes	%	±%
Labor	Clem Campbell	10,171	57.9	+4.0
National	Mary Ann Walsh	5,316	30.3	−10.4
Liberal	Peter MacSween	1,773	10.1	+10.1
Grey Power	Linues Myles	300	1.7	+1.7
Total formal votes		17,560	97.9	−0.4
Informal votes		371	2.1	+0.4
Turnout		17,931	92.2	−0.8
Two-party-preferred result
Labor	Clem Campbell	10,606	60.4	+3.8
National	Mary Ann Walsh	6,954	39.6	−3.8
Labor hold		Swing	+3.8	

=== Burdekin ===
1989 Queensland state election: Burdekin
Party	Candidate	Votes	%	±%
National	Mark Stoneman	5,229	41.1	−11.5
Labor	Don Wallace	5,002	39.3	+6.0
Liberal	Anthony Chandler	2,506	19.7	+9.3
Total formal votes		12,737	97.3	−0.9
Informal votes		358	2.7	+0.9
Turnout		13,095	93.1	−0.4
Two-party-preferred result
National	Mark Stoneman	7,249	56.9	−5.0
Labor	Don Wallace	5,488	43.1	+5.0
National hold		Swing	−5.0	

=== Burnett ===
1989 Queensland state election: Burnett
Party	Candidate	Votes	%	±%
National	Doug Slack	6,584	46.6	−18.5
Labor	Vicki Pritchett	4,786	33.9	−1.0
Independent	Maurice Chapman	1,618	11.5	+11.5
Liberal	Alex Warren	1,131	8.0	+8.0
Total formal votes		14,119	97.9	+0.1
Informal votes		299	2.1	−0.1
Turnout		14,418	92.6	−0.5
Two-party-preferred result
National	Doug Slack	8,627	61.1	−4.0
Labor	Vicki Pritchett	5,492	38.9	+4.0
National hold		Swing	−4.0	

=== Caboolture ===
1989 Queensland state election: Caboolture
Party	Candidate	Votes	%	±%
Labor	Ken Hayward	13,522	56.8	+3.1
Liberal	Bob O'Sullivan	4,629	19.4	+19.4
National	Roy Rogers	2,772	11.6	−34.7
Independent	James Kessels	2,033	8.5	+8.5
Call to Australia	Raymond De Gruchy	614	2.6	+2.6
Independent	Ron Fenton	239	1.0	+1.0
Total formal votes		23,809	96.4	+0.9
Informal votes		882	3.6	−0.9
Turnout		24,691	92.8	+0.8
Two-party-preferred result
Labor	Ken Hayward	14,571	61.2	+7.5
Liberal	Bob O'Sullivan	9,238	38.8	+38.8
Labor hold		Swing	+7.5	

=== Cairns ===
1989 Queensland state election: Cairns
Party	Candidate	Votes	%	±%
Labor	Keith De Lacy	9,937	62.9	+6.7
National	Wally Scholtens	5,855	37.1	−6.7
Total formal votes		15,792	94.4	−1.9
Informal votes		929	5.6	+1.9
Turnout		16,721	85.2	−2.4
Labor hold		Swing	+6.7	

=== Callide ===
1989 Queensland state election: Callide
Party	Candidate	Votes	%	±%
National	Di McCauley	7,365	54.3	+4.4
Labor	Greg Clair	6,201	45.7	+16.7
Total formal votes		13,566	97.0	−1.5
Informal votes		421	3.0	+1.5
Turnout		13,987	92.0	+0.4
National hold		Swing	−8.9	

=== Carnarvon ===
1989 Queensland state election: Carnarvon
Party	Candidate	Votes	%	±%
National	Lawrence Springborg	4,712	41.3	−25.8
Labor	Maurice Passmore	3,676	32.3	−0.6
Liberal	Ruth Buchanan	1,481	13.0	+13.0
Independent	Jim Smith	836	7.3	+7.3
Independent	Graham Caslick	692	6.1	+6.1
Total formal votes		11,397	96.0	−1.3
Informal votes		472	4.0	+1.3
Turnout		11,869	91.9	−0.1
Two-party-preferred result
National	Lawrence Springborg	6,710	58.9	−8.2
Labor	Maurice Passmore	4,687	41.1	+8.2
National hold		Swing	−8.2	

=== Chatsworth ===
1989 Queensland state election: Chatsworth
Party	Candidate	Votes	%	±%
Labor	Terry Mackenroth	12,647	61.3	+8.5
Liberal	Jack Butler	5,870	28.4	+7.2
National	David Stone	2,125	10.3	−15.7
Total formal votes		20,642	97.6	−0.5
Informal votes		364	2.4	+0.5
Turnout		21,157	93.0	−0.2
Two-party-preferred result
Labor	Terry Mackenroth	12,798	62.0	+4.7
Liberal	Jack Butler	7,844	38.0	+38.0
Labor hold		Swing	+4.7	

=== Condamine ===
1989 Queensland state election: Condamine
Party	Candidate	Votes	%	±%
National	Brian Littleproud	9,102	75.4	−3.1
Labor	Bill Murphy	2,967	24.6	+3.1
Total formal votes		12,069	95.9	−1.9
Informal votes		514	4.1	+1.9
Turnout		12,583	93.6	−0.3
National hold		Swing	−3.1	

=== Cook ===
1989 Queensland state election: Cook
Party	Candidate	Votes	%	±%
Labor	Steve Bredhauer	4,305	43.1	−23.5
National	Lester Rosendale	2,208	22.1	−11.3
Independent	David Byrne	979	9.8	+9.8
Independent	James Akee	910	9.1	+9.1
Liberal	Bill Rutherford	706	7.1	+7.1
Independent	Dan Paterson	564	5.7	+5.7
Independent	Norman Johnson	313	3.1	+3.1
Total formal votes		9,985	92.8	−3.0
Informal votes		769	7.2	+3.0
Turnout		10,754	80.6	−1.7
Two-party-preferred result
Labor	Steve Bredhauer	5,881	58.9	−7.7
National	Lester Rosendale	4,104	41.1	+7.7
Labor hold		Swing	−7.7	

=== Cooroora ===
1989 Queensland state election: Cooroora
Party	Candidate	Votes	%	±%
Labor	Ray Barber	11,857	48.1	+16.8
National	Robin Priebe	5,629	22.8	−26.6
Liberal	Allen Low	5,613	22.8	+8.2
Independent	Joseph Roach	1,561	6.3	+6.3
Total formal votes		24,660	97.2	−1.3
Informal votes		702	2.8	+1.3
Turnout		25,362	89.3	−0.0
Two-party-preferred result
Labor	Ray Barber	12,584	51.0	+12.2
Liberal	Allen Low	12,076	49.0	+49.0
Labor gain from National		Swing	+12.2	

=== Cunningham ===
1989 Queensland state election: Cunningham
Party	Candidate	Votes	%	±%
National	Tony Elliott	7,376	51.1	−28.8
Liberal	Malcolm Wilson	3,742	25.9	+25.9
Labor	Noel Payne	3,309	22.9	+2.8
Total formal votes		14,427	97.7	+0.3
Informal votes		339	2.3	−0.3
Turnout		14,766	93.0	+0.3
Two-party-preferred result
National	Tony Elliott	10,330	71.6	−8.3
Labor	Noel Payne	4,097	28.4	+8.3
National hold		Swing	−8.3	

- The two party preferred vote was not counted between the National and Liberal candidates for Cunningham.

=== Currumbin ===
1989 Queensland state election: Currumbin
Party	Candidate	Votes	%	±%
Labor	Michael Batkin	9,955	44.5	+10.9
Liberal	Trevor Coomber	6,767	30.3	+16.4
National	Leo Gately	4,553	20.4	−19.4
Democrats	John Moreland	1,078	4.8	+2.9
Total formal votes		22,353	97.4	−0.4
Informal votes		593	2.6	+0.4
Turnout		22,946	87.7	−1.2
Two-party-preferred result
Liberal	Trevor Coomber	11,381	50.9	+50.9
Labor	Michael Batkin	10,972	49.1	+8.0
Liberal gain from National		Swing	+50.9	

=== Everton ===
1989 Queensland state election: Everton
Party	Candidate	Votes	%	±%
Labor	Glen Milliner	12,165	62.7	+13.3
Liberal	Greg Smith	5,909	30.5	+2.6
National	Peter Kuskie	1,317	6.8	−15.9
Total formal votes		19,391	97.8	−0.8
Informal votes		438	2.2	+0.8
Turnout		19,829	93.9	+0.6
Two-party-preferred result
Labor	Glen Milliner	12,255	63.2	+11.7
Liberal	Greg Smith	7,136	36.8	−11.7
Labor hold		Swing	+11.7	

=== Fassifern ===
1989 Queensland state election: Fassifern
Party	Candidate	Votes	%	±%
Labor	Don Petersen	10,140	42.4	+11.3
National	Kev Lingard	7,435	31.1	−20.2
Liberal	Margaret Grevett	5,186	21.7	+4.1
Citizens Electoral Council	Lawrence Hawkins	707	3.0	+3.0
Citizens Electoral Council	Clyde Willis	463	1.9	+1.9
Total formal votes		23,931	96.8	−1.3
Informal votes		799	3.2	+1.3
Turnout		24,730	91.8	−0.4
Two-party-preferred result
National	Kev Lingard	12,588	52.6	−11.4
Labor	Don Petersen	11,343	47.4	+11.4
National hold		Swing	−11.4	

=== Flinders ===
1989 Queensland state election: Flinders
Party	Candidate	Votes	%	±%
Labor	Noel Robertson	4,316	45.2	+6.0
National	Bob Katter	4,315	45.2	−15.6
Independent	Beryl Hunter	408	4.3	+4.3
Liberal	Owen Pershouse	345	3.6	+3.6
Independent	Harrison Duncan	165	1.7	+1.7
Total formal votes		9,549	96.2	−1.1
Informal votes		381	3.8	+1.1
Turnout		9,930	89.6	−0.4
Two-party-preferred result
National	Bob Katter	4,976	52.1	−8.7
Labor	Noel Robertson	4,573	47.9	+8.7
National hold		Swing	−8.7	

=== Glass House ===
1989 Queensland state election: Glass House
Party	Candidate	Votes	%	±%
Labor	Jon Sullivan	11,617	47.2	+9.8
National	Bill Newton	6,593	26.8	−19.8
Liberal	Errol Johnston	4,958	20.2	+7.5
Call to Australia	Rona Joyner	872	3.5	+3.5
Democrats	Glen Spicer	567	2.3	−0.9
Total formal votes		24,607	96.0	−0.9
Informal votes		1,034	4.0	+0.9
Turnout		25,641	92.4	+0.2
Two-party-preferred result
Labor	Jon Sullivan	12,704	51.6	+8.5
National	Bill Newton	11,903	48.4	−8.5
Labor gain from National		Swing	+8.5	

=== Greenslopes ===
1989 Queensland state election: Greenslopes
Party	Candidate	Votes	%	±%
Labor	Gary Fenlon	10,180	53.0	+16.5
Liberal	Graham Young	5,657	29.5	+1.3
National	Leisha Harvey	2,319	12.1	−20.4
Independent	Richard Tiainen	1,040	5.4	+5.4
Total formal votes		19,196	98.0	−0.3
Informal votes		389	2.0	+0.3
Turnout		19,585	92.4	+0.1
Two-party-preferred result
Labor	Gary Fenlon	10,673	55.6	+9.8
Liberal	Graham Young	8,523	44.4	+44.4
Labor gain from National		Swing	+9.8	

=== Gregory ===
1989 Queensland state election: Gregory
Party	Candidate	Votes	%	±%
National	Vaughan Johnson	3,441	49.4	−14.1
Labor	Robert Nilon	2,860	41.0	+4.5
Liberal	Dudley Church	366	5.3	+5.3
Independent	Alan Barton	189	2.7	+2.7
Independent	Leo Baird	112	1.6	+1.6
Total formal votes		6,968	96.8	−0.5
Informal votes		227	3.2	+0.5
Turnout		7,195	88.5	+0.1
Two-party-preferred result
National	Vaughan Johnson	3,958	56.8	−6.7
Labor	Robert Nilon	3,010	43.2	+6.7
National hold		Swing	−6.7	

=== Gympie ===
1989 Queensland state election: Gympie
Party	Candidate	Votes	%	±%
Labor	Geoffrey Brown	5,376	35.6	+3.3
National	Len Stephan	5,076	33.6	−23.8
Independent	Adrian McClintock	2,173	14.4	+14.4
Independent	Bruce Chapman	1,179	7.8	+7.8
Liberal	Bruce Kean	1,144	7.6	−2.8
United People	Lewis Blayse	147	1.0	+1.0
Total formal votes		15,095	97.0	−1.5
Informal votes		463	3.0	−1.5
Turnout		15,558	92.2	−0.8
Two-party-preferred result
National	Len Stephan	8,603	57.0	−7.8
Labor	Geoffrey Brown	6,492	43.0	+7.8
National hold		Swing	−7.8	

=== Hinchinbrook ===
1989 Queensland state election: Hinchinbrook
Party	Candidate	Votes	%	±%
Labor	George Day	5,354	43.3	+4.2
National	Marc Rowell	4,240	34.3	−13.3
Liberal	Antonino Cardillo	2,526	20.4	+8.8
Independent	Ron Dunn	236	1.9	+0.2
Total formal votes		12,356	97.2	−0.7
Informal votes		355	2.8	+0.7
Turnout		12,711	92.6	−0.4
Two-party-preferred result
National	Marc Rowell	6,353	51.4	−5.6
Labor	George Day	6,003	48.6	+5.6
National hold		Swing	−5.6	

=== Ipswich ===
1989 Queensland state election: Ipswich
Party	Candidate	Votes	%	±%
Labor	David Hamill	12,784	66.3	+7.5
Liberal	Ian Vagg	5,597	29.0	+11.3
Independent	Don McNabb	896	4.7	+4.7
Total formal votes		19,277	97.7	−0.3
Informal votes		450	2.3	+0.3
Turnout		19,727	93.2	+0.4
Two-party-preferred result
Labor	David Hamill	13,070	67.8	+4.1
Liberal	Ian Vagg	6,207	32.2	−4.1
Labor hold		Swing	+4.1	

=== Ipswich West ===
1989 Queensland state election: Ipswich West
Party	Candidate	Votes	%	±%
Labor	Don Livingstone	12,434	62.1	+5.9
Liberal	Ken Clift	7,600	37.9	+20.1
Total formal votes		20,034	95.8	−2.1
Informal votes		888	4.2	+2.1
Turnout		20,922	91.8	+1.7
Labor hold		Swing	+0.9	

=== Isis ===
1989 Queensland state election: Isis
Party	Candidate	Votes	%	±%
Labor	Bill Nunn	10,174	44.4	+6.0
National	Bob Kerr	4,850	21.2	−31.5
Independent	Lin Powell	4,117	18.0	+18.0
Liberal	Fred Kleinschmidt	3,758	16.4	+16.4
Total formal votes		22,899	97.6	−0.50
Informal votes		550	2.3	+0.5
Turnout		23,449	92.1	+0.1
Two-party-preferred result
Labor	Bill Nunn	11,467	50.1	+7.5
National	Bob Kerr	11,432	49.9	−7.5
Labor gain from National		Swing	+7.5	

=== Landsborough ===
1989 Queensland state election: Landsborough
Party	Candidate	Votes	%	±%
Labor	Frank Bowyer	10,538	40.0	+7.2
National	Mike Ahern	10,400	39.5	−10.5
Liberal	Garnet Ross	4,465	17.0	−0.3
Community Independents	Santo Ferraro	920	3.5	+3.5
Total formal votes		26,323	97.5	−0.7
Informal votes		683	2.5	+0.7
Turnout		27,006	91.2	+1.3
Two-party-preferred result
National	Mike Ahern	14,720	55.9	−5.7
Labor	Frank Bowyer	11,603	44.1	+5.7
National hold		Swing	−5.7	

==== By-election ====
- This by-election was caused by the resignation of Mike Ahern. It was held on 28 July 1990.

1990 Landsborough state by-election
Party	Candidate	Votes	%	±%
Liberal	Joan Sheldon	7,407	30.5	+13.5
National	John Edwards	6,071	25.0	−14.5
Independent Labor	Francis Bowyer	4,639	19.1	+19.1
Independent	Peter Sawyer	4,017	16.6	+16.6
Democrats	Graeme Bowman	1,238	5.1	+5.1
Call to Australia	Rona Joyner	456	1.9	+1.9
Conservative	Raymond Kalms	431	1.8	+1.8
Total formal votes		24,259	95.3	−2.2
Informal votes		1,197	4.7	+2.2
Turnout		25,456	81.8	−9.4
Two-candidate-preferred result
Liberal	Joan Sheldon	15,644	64.5	+64.5
National	John Edwards	8,615	35.5	−20.4
Liberal gain from National		Swing	N/A	

=== Lockyer ===
1989 Queensland state election: Lockyer
Party	Candidate	Votes	%	±%
National	Tony Fitzgerald	9,090	47.1	−14.2
Labor	Marie Klajn	4,952	25.7	+6.1
Liberal	Fabius Manners	3,821	19.8	+0.7
Independent	Bryan Greenham	1,066	5.5	+5.5
Independent	Peter McKinlay	356	1.9	+1.9
Total formal votes		19,285	97.8	−0.8
Informal votes		439	2.2	+0.8
Turnout		19,724	92.7	−0.2
Two-party-preferred result
National	Tony Fitzgerald	13,172	68.3	−6.8
Labor	Marie Klajn	6,113	31.7	+6.8
National hold		Swing	−6.8	

=== Logan ===
1989 Queensland state election: Logan
Party	Candidate	Votes	%	±%
Labor	Wayne Goss	16,836	67.3	+15.6
Liberal	Peter Carroll	5,024	20.1	+5.4
National	Wayne Robertson	3,159	12.6	−19.6
Total formal votes		25,019	95.6	−1.8
Informal votes		1,142	4.4	+1.8
Turnout		26,161	89.6	+1.1
Two-party-preferred result
Labor	Wayne Goss	17,063	68.2	+11.4
Liberal	Peter Carroll	5,024	32.8	+32.8
Labor hold		Swing	+11.4	

=== Lytton ===
1989 Queensland state election: Lytton
Party	Candidate	Votes	%	±%
Labor	Tom Burns	14,243	71.6	+9.1
Liberal	Peter Dutton	3,313	16.7	+3.1
National	Victor Sirl	2,328	11.7	−12.2
Total formal votes		19,884	97.5	−0.5
Informal votes		511	2.5	+0.5
Turnout		20,395	92.8	+0.4
Two-party-preferred result
Labor	Tom Burns	14,416	72.5	+6.2
Liberal	Peter Dutton	5,468	27.5	+27.5
Labor hold		Swing	+6.2	

=== Mackay ===
1989 Queensland state election: Mackay
Party	Candidate	Votes	%	±%
Labor	Ed Casey	9,566	58.0	+6.5
National	Greg Williamson	4,717	28.6	−12.3
Liberal	Gary Kennedy	1,688	10.2	+2.6
Independent	Trevor Dempster	531	3.2	+3.2
Total formal votes		16,502	97.1	−1.5
Informal votes		489	2.9	+1.5
Turnout		16,991	90.5	−0.4
Two-party-preferred result
Labor	Ed Casey	10,050	60.9	+7.3
National	Greg Williamson	6,452	39.1	−7.3
Labor hold		Swing	+7.3	

=== Manly ===
1989 Queensland state election: Manly
Party	Candidate	Votes	%	±%
Labor	Jim Elder	14,174	57.3	+6.3
Liberal	Verlie Farrell	4,189	16.9	+3.7
National	Paul Asher	3,709	15.0	−13.4
Democrats	Robert George	2,392	9.7	+9.7
Advance Australia	Barry Cullen	265	1.1	+1.1
Total formal votes		24,729	96.7	−1.4
Informal votes		849	3.3	+1.4
Turnout		25,578	92.4	−0.3
Two-party-preferred result
Labor	Jim Elder	15,827	64.0	+7.3
Liberal	Verlie Farrell	8,902	36.0	+36.0
Labor hold		Swing	+7.3	

=== Mansfield ===
1989 Queensland state election: Mansfield
Party	Candidate	Votes	%	±%
Labor	Laurel Power	9,298	47.6	+10.2
National	Craig Sherrin	5,683	29.1	−7.3
Liberal	David Greig	4,557	23.3	−2.9
Total formal votes		19,538	97.5	−0.4
Informal votes		496	2.5	+0.4
Turnout		20,034	92.9	−0.2
Two-party-preferred result
Labor	Laurel Power	10,229	52.4	+7.9
National	Craig Sherrin	9,309	47.6	−7.9
Labor gain from National		Swing	+7.9	

=== Maryborough ===
1989 Queensland state election: Maryborough
Party	Candidate	Votes	%	±%
Labor	Bob Dollin	8,887	49.0	−0.3
National	Gilbert Alison	7,163	39.5	−11.2
Liberal	Kevin Mahoney	1,571	8.7	+8.7
Citizens Electoral Council	Camillo Primavera	529	2.9	+2.9
Total formal votes		18,150	97.7	−0.2
Informal votes		419	2.3	+0.2
Turnout		18,569	94.1	−0.7
Two-party-preferred result
Labor	Bob Dollin	9,329	51.4	+2.1
National	Gilbert Alison	8,821	48.6	−2.1
Labor gain from National		Swing	+2.1	

=== Merthyr ===
1989 Queensland state election: Merthyr
Party	Candidate	Votes	%	±%
Labor	Barbara Dawson	8,662	48.4	+15.9
Liberal	Santo Santoro	7,267	40.6	+8.5
National	Pat Kelly	1,955	10.9	−21.9
Total formal votes		17,884	97.0	+0.1
Informal votes		548	3.0	+0.1
Turnout		18,432	94.5	+5.2
Two-party-preferred result
Liberal	Santo Santoro	9,024	50.5	+50.5
Labor	Barbara Dawson	8,860	49.5	+5.5
Liberal gain from National		Swing	N/A	

=== Mirani ===
1989 Queensland state election: Mirani
Party	Candidate	Votes	%	±%
National	Jim Randell	5,933	46.8	−11.5
Labor	David Robinson	5,659	44.6	+2.9
Liberal	Bevin Coleman	1,093	8.6	+8.6
Total formal votes		12,685	97.7	−0.5
Informal votes		297	2.3	+0.5
Turnout		12,982	93.1	+0.5
Two-party-preferred result
National	Jim Randell	6,788	53.5	−4.8
Labor	David Robinson	5,897	46.5	+4.8
National hold		Swing	−4.8	

=== Moggill ===
1989 Queensland state election: Moggill
Party	Candidate	Votes	%	±%
Liberal	David Watson	8,004	42.8	+0.6
Labor	Robyn Campbell	7,509	40.2	+17.0
National	Trevor St Baker	2,245	12.0	−18.2
Greens	James Fredericks	939	5.0	+5.0
Total formal votes		18,697	98.2	−0.5
Informal votes		338	1.8	+0.5
Turnout		19,035	92.2	+0.0
Two-party-preferred result
Liberal	David Watson	10,469	56.0	−12.1
Labor	Robyn Campbell	8,228	44.0	+44.0
Liberal hold		Swing	−12.1	

=== Mount Coot-tha ===
1989 Queensland state election: Mount Coot-tha
Party	Candidate	Votes	%	±%
Labor	Wendy Edmond	9,461	54.8	+15.7
Liberal	Lyle Schuntner	5,860	34.0	+4.0
National	Geoffrey Colless	1,454	8.4	−18.2
Greens	Myron Loving	481	2.8	+2.8
Total formal votes		17,256	98.1	0.0
Informal votes		328	1.9	0.0
Turnout		17,584	90.8	−0.8
Two-party-preferred result
Labor	Wendy Edmond	9,836	57.0	+13.2
Liberal	Lyle Schuntner	7,420	43.0	−13.2
Labor gain from Liberal		Swing	+13.2	

=== Mount Gravatt ===
1989 Queensland state election: Mount Gravatt
Party	Candidate	Votes	%	±%
Labor	Judy Spence	9,697	50.3	+16.7
Liberal	Guelfi Scassola	5,845	30.3	−1.4
National	Ian Henderson	3,738	19.4	−14.2
Total formal votes		19,280	97.2	−0.6
Informal votes		550	2.8	+0.6
Turnout		19,830	92.7	−0.2
Two-party-preferred result
Labor	Judy Spence	9,968	51.7	+8.4
Liberal	Guelfi Scassola	9,312	48.3	+48.3
Labor gain from National		Swing	+8.4	

=== Mount Isa ===
1989 Queensland state election: Mount Isa
Party	Candidate	Votes	%	±%
Labor	Tony McGrady	6,760	59.6	+14.1
Liberal	Peter Beard	3,712	32.7	+1.6
National	Stephen Wollaston	877	7.7	−15.7
Total formal votes		11,349	95.9	−1.9
Informal votes		489	4.1	+1.9
Turnout		11,838	88.6	−0.3
Two-party-preferred result
Labor	Tony McGrady	6,821	60.1	+12.8
Liberal	Peter Beard	4,528	39.9	−12.8
Labor gain from Liberal		Swing	+12.8	

=== Mourilyan ===
1989 Queensland state election: Mourilyan
Party	Candidate	Votes	%	±%
Labor	Bill Eaton	6,773	54.2	+3.2
National	Malcolm Taylor	4,107	32.8	−5.0
Independent	Philip Condon	1,628	13.0	+13.0
Total formal votes		12,508	97.1	−1.6
Informal votes		378	2.9	+1.6
Turnout		12,886	90.9	+0.9
Two-party-preferred result
Labor	Bill Eaton	7,280	58.2	+4.1
National	Malcolm Taylor	5,228	41.8	−4.1
Labor hold		Swing	+4.1	

=== Mulgrave ===
1989 Queensland state election: Mulgrave
Party	Candidate	Votes	%	±%
Labor	Warren Pitt	7,350	51.7	+10.7
National	Max Menzel	6,876	48.3	+5.2
Total formal votes		14,226	95.9	−2.4
Informal votes		614	4.1	+2.4
Turnout		12,489	91.6	+0.6
Labor gain from National		Swing	+5.4	

=== Murrumba ===
1989 Queensland state election: Murrumba
Party	Candidate	Votes	%	±%
Labor	Dean Wells	12,223	61.8	+18.5
Liberal	Patrick Seeney	4,907	24.8	+8.1
National	Phil Benson	2,663	13.4	−12.7
Total formal votes		19,793	97.3	−0.8
Informal votes		545	2.7	+0.8
Turnout		20,338	92.9	−0.3
Two-party-preferred result
Labor	Dean Wells	12,410	62.7	+7.2
Liberal	Patrick Seeney	7,303	37.3	+37.3
Labor hold		Swing	+7.2	

=== Nerang ===
1989 Queensland state election: Nerang
Party	Candidate	Votes	%	±%
Labor	Robert Lee	10,828	45.6	+12.8
Liberal	Ray Connor	6,499	27.4	+9.4
National	Tom Hynd	5,832	24.6	−19.2
Independent	Harry Howard	585	2.5	+2.5
Total formal votes		23,744	96.3	−0.9
Informal votes		918	3.7	+0.9
Turnout		24,662	88.5	+0.2
Two-party-preferred result
Liberal	Ray Connor	12,210	51.4	+51.4
Labor	Robert Lee	11,534	48.6	+8.5
Liberal gain from National		Swing	+51.4	

=== Nicklin ===
1989 Queensland state election: Nicklin
Party	Candidate	Votes	%	±%
Labor	Ian Matthews	9,105	37.5	+8.7
National	Neil Turner	5,779	23.8	−17.4
Liberal	Bob King	5,607	23.1	+4.3
Independent	Keith Bartholomew	2,492	10.3	+10.3
Independent	Cecil Hamley	594	2.4	+2.4
Conservative	Judith Jackson	384	1.6	+1.6
Democrats	Bob Borsellino	337	1.4	−2.8
Total formal votes		24,298	97.0	−1.5
Informal votes		754	3.0	+1.5
Turnout		25,052	90.3	+0.3
Two-party-preferred result
Liberal	Bob King	14,164	58.3	+58.3
Labor	Ian Matthews	10,134	41.7	+2.6
Liberal gain from National		Swing	N/A	

Court of Disputed Returns decision on Nicklin, 21 November 1990
Party	Candidate	Votes	%	±%
Labor	Ian Matthews	9,105	37.47	−0.04
National	Neil Turner	5,774	23.80	+0.02
Liberal	Bob King	5,584	23.02	−0.06
Independent	Keith Bartholomew	2,488	10.26	0.00
Independent	Cecil Hamley	594	2.45	+0.01
Conservative	Judith Jackson	384	1.58	0.00
Democrats	Bob Borsellino	336	1.39	0.00
Total formal votes		24,259	97.84	−0.15
Informal votes		792	3.16	+0.15
Turnout		25,051	90.34	0.00
Two-party-preferred result
National	Neil Turner	12,912	53.23	+53.23
Labor	Ian Matthews	11,347	46.77	+5.06
National gain from Liberal		Swing	N/A	

^{1} The court declared the 1989 election result void. Instead of a by-election, the ballot papers were recounted and the National Party candidate was declared the winner on the preference count.

=== Nudgee ===
1989 Queensland state election: Nudgee
Party	Candidate	Votes	%	±%
Labor	Ken Vaughan	11,629	67.8	+9.7
Liberal	Ron Nightingale	3,593	21.0	+2.9
National	Charles Allsop	1,927	11.2	−12.6
Total formal votes		17,149	97.0	−1.0
Informal votes		349	3.0	+1.0
Turnout		17,682	92.4	+1.6
Two-party-preferred result
Labor	Ken Vaughan	11,764	68.6	+5.5
Liberal	Ron Nightingale	5,385	31.4	+31.4
Labor hold		Swing	+5.5	

=== Nundah ===
1989 Queensland state election: Nundah
Party	Candidate	Votes	%	±%
Labor	Phil Heath	10,443	57.4	+13.9
Liberal	William Knox	6,201	34.1	+0.5
National	Russell Parry	1,548	8.5	−14.3
Total formal votes		18,192	97.6	−0.6
Informal votes		450	2.4	+0.6
Turnout		18,642	91.5	−0.6
Two-party-preferred result
Labor	Phil Heath	10,551	58.0	+13.4
Liberal	William Knox	7,641	42.0	−13.4
Labor gain from Liberal		Swing	+13.4	

==== By-election ====
- This by-election was caused by the resignation of Phil Heath. It was held on 18 May 1991.

1991 Nundah state by-election
Party	Candidate	Votes	%	±%
Labor	Terry Sullivan	7,100	43.6	−13.8
Liberal	John Hood	5,474	33.6	−0.5
Independent	John Hay	1,158	7.1	+7.1
National	Yvonne Chapman	1,010	6.2	−2.3
Independent	Ray Hugall	536	3.3	+3.3
Democrats	Ian Rowland	393	2.4	+2.4
Call to Australia	Rona Joyner	349	2.1	+2.1
Independent	Ronald Nightingale	276	1.7	+1.7
Total formal votes		16,296	96.7	−0.9
Informal votes		558	3.3	+0.9
Turnout		16,854	83.3	−8.2
Two-party-preferred result
Labor	Terry Sullivan	8,208	50.4	−7.6
Liberal	John Hood	8,088	49.6	+7.6
Labor hold		Swing	−7.6	

=== Peak Downs ===
1989 Queensland state election: Peak Downs
Party	Candidate	Votes	%	±%
National	Vince Lester	4,232	50.6	−14.0
Labor	Paul Bell	3,160	37.8	+7.3
Citizens Electoral Council	Robert Reinke	971	11.6	+11.6
Total formal votes		8,363	98.6	−0.1
Informal votes		122	1.4	+0.1
Turnout		8,485	91.3	+0.7
Two-party-preferred result
National	Vince Lester	4,976	59.5	−7.5
Labor	Paul Bell	3,387	40.5	+7.5
National hold		Swing	−7.5	

=== Pine Rivers ===
1989 Queensland state election: Pine Rivers
Party	Candidate	Votes	%	±%
Labor	Margaret Woodgate	11,286	53.4	+16.2
National	Yvonne Chapman	3,861	18.3	−15.9
Liberal	Rob Akers	2,758	13.1	−13.3
Liberal	Graham Harris	2,626	12.4	+12.4
Independent	Trevor Campbell	376	1.8	+1.8
Independent	John Kennedy	233	1.1	+1.1
Total formal votes		21,140	97.2	−0.9
Informal votes		598	2.8	+0.9
Turnout		21,738	94.7	+1.0
Two-party-preferred result
Labor	Margaret Woodgate	11,754	55.6	+9.1
Liberal	Rob Akers	9,386	44.4	+44.4
Labor gain from National		Swing	+9.1	

=== Port Curtis ===
1989 Queensland state election: Port Curtis
Party	Candidate	Votes	%	±%
Labor	Bill Prest	9,016	61.7	+7.9
National	Ron Streeter	3,230	22.1	−19.9
Independent	Eric Bailey	2,083	14.2	+14.2
Independent	Kevin Meyrick	288	2.0	−2.2
Total formal votes		14,617	97.5	−0.8
Informal votes		380	2.5	+0.8
Turnout		14,997	91.7	−0.3
Two-party-preferred result
Labor	Bill Prest	9,750	66.7	+10.8
National	Ron Streeter	4,867	33.3	−10.8
Labor hold		Swing	+10.8	

=== Redcliffe ===
1989 Queensland state election: Redcliffe
Party	Candidate	Votes	%	±%
Labor	Ray Hollis	9,917	50.7	+10.1
Liberal	Terry White	7,944	40.6	−2.9
National	Robert Quinn	1,165	6.0	−14.3
Independent	Jenny Ballantine-Morr	532	2.7	+2.7
Total formal votes		19,558	97.7	−0.6
Informal votes		459	2.3	+0.6
Turnout		20,017	91.8	−0.6
Two-party-preferred result
Labor	Ray Hollis	10,170	52.0	+9.7
Liberal	Terry White	9,388	48.0	−9.7
Labor gain from Liberal		Swing	+9.7	

=== Redlands ===
1989 Queensland state election: Redlands
Party	Candidate	Votes	%	±%
Labor	Darryl Briskey	11,750	48.9	+9.1
National	Paul Clauson	6,024	25.1	−16.5
Democrats	Geoffrey Speakman	978	4.1	+1.2
Independent	Leo Grace	297	1.2	+1.2
Total formal votes		24,031	97.8	−0.6
Informal votes		534	2.2	+0.6
Turnout		24,565	92.9	+0.1
Two-party-preferred result
Labor	Darryl Briskey	13,505	56.2	+10.0
National	Paul Clauson	10,526	43.8	−10.0
Labor gain from National		Swing	+10.0	

=== Rockhampton ===
1989 Queensland state election: Rockhampton
Party	Candidate	Votes	%	±%
Labor	Paul Braddy	10,022	63.8	+7.9
National	Barry Such	5,693	36.2	−3.2
Total formal votes		15,715	96.0	−2.2
Informal votes		649	4.0	+2.2
Turnout		16,364	93.1	−0.8
Labor hold		Swing	+5.6	

=== Rockhampton North ===
1989 Queensland state election: Rockhampton North
Party	Candidate	Votes	%	±%
Labor	Robert Schwarten	11,358	55.4	−0.8
National	Lee Nevison	5,938	29.0	−6.5
Liberal	Alan Cornick	2,131	10.4	+10.4
Citizens Electoral Council	Len Clampett	834	4.1	+4.1
Citizens Electoral Council	Jon Harding	239	1.2	+1.2
Total formal votes		20,500	97.6	−0.5
Informal votes		493	2.4	+0.5
Turnout		20,993	93.7	+0.4
Two-party-preferred result
Labor	Robert Schwarten	12,013	58.6	−1.7
National	Lee Nevison	8,487	41.4	+1.7
Labor hold		Swing	−1.7	

=== Roma ===
1989 Queensland state election: Roma
Party	Candidate	Votes	%	±%
National	Russell Cooper	5,290	73.2	+3.7
Labor	August Johanson	1,938	26.8	−3.7
Total formal votes		7,228	96.4	−1.4
Informal votes		271	3.6	+1.4
Turnout		7,499	91.2	−0.8
National hold		Swing	+3.7	

=== Salisbury ===
1989 Queensland state election: Salisbury
Party	Candidate	Votes	%	±%
Labor	Len Ardill	13,379	57.6	+12.3
Liberal	Richard Iliff	7,069	30.5	+5.9
National	Ross Adams	2,762	11.9	−18.2
Total formal votes		23,210	97.3	−0.8
Informal votes		647	2.7	+0.8
Turnout		23,857	94.1	+1.0
Two-party-preferred result
Labor	Len Ardill	13,578	58.5	+7.1
Liberal	Richard Iliff	9,632	41.5	+41.5
Labor hold		Swing	+7.1	

=== Sandgate ===
1989 Queensland state election: Sandgate
Party	Candidate	Votes	%	±%
Labor	Nev Warburton	12,839	66.5	+7.3
Liberal	Ron Nankervis	4,308	22.3	+6.1
National	Stephen Purtill	2,171	11.2	−13.5
Total formal votes		19,318	97.0	−1.0
Informal votes		587	3.0	+1.0
Turnout		19,905	91.7	−1.0
Two-party-preferred result
Labor	Nev Warburton	13,001	67.3	+3.6
Liberal	Ron Nankervis	6,317	32.7	+32.7
Labor hold		Swing	+3.6	

=== Sherwood ===
1989 Queensland state election: Sherwood
Party	Candidate	Votes	%	±%
Liberal	Angus Innes	10,837	53.9	−13.8
Labor	Peter Pyke	9,282	46.1	+13.8
Total formal votes		20,119	96.6	+0.3
Informal votes		713	3.4	−0.3
Turnout		20,832	91.7	−0.4
Liberal hold		Swing	−13.8	

==== By-election ====
- This by-election was caused by the resignation of Angus Innes. It was held on 28 July 1990.

1990 Sherwood state by-election
Party	Candidate	Votes	%	±%
Liberal	David Dunworth	8,858	50.2	−3.7
Independent Labor	Peter Pyke	7,114	40.3	+40.3
Democrats	Gilruth Rees	1,151	6.5	+6.5
Grey Power	Bernard Appel	393	2.2	+2.2
Independent	Anthony Vestey	126	0.7	+0.7
Total formal votes		17,642	96.8	+0.2
Informal votes		573	3.2	−0.2
Turnout		18,215	80.3	−11.4
Liberal hold		Swing	N/A	

- Preferences were not distributed.

=== Somerset ===
1989 Queensland state election: Somerset
Party	Candidate	Votes	%	±%
Labor	Lyn Kally	7,770	36.8	+0.8
National	Bill Gunn	7,359	34.8	−29.2
Liberal	Neil Zabel	3,252	15.4	+15.4
Independent	Jean Bray	1,435	6.8	+6.8
Independent	Rob Lucas	787	3.7	+3.7
Independent	Noel Qualischefski	516	2.4	+2.4
Total formal votes		21,119	96.6	−0.4
Informal votes		755	3.4	+0.4
Turnout		21,874	92.7	+0.3
Two-party-preferred result
National	Bill Gunn	11,396	54.0	−10.0
Labor	Lyn Kally	9,723	46.0	+10.0
National hold		Swing	−10.0	

=== South Brisbane ===
1989 Queensland state election: South Brisbane
Party	Candidate	Votes	%	±%
Labor	Anne Warner	10,037	57.9	+9.8
Liberal	Heather Scantlebury	3,547	20.5	−0.5
National	Peter Peters	2,094	12.1	−15.7
Greens	Peter Hutton	1,656	9.6	+9.6
Total formal votes		17,334	96.4	−0.2
Informal votes		639	3.6	+0.2
Turnout		17,973	85.7	−2.6
Two-party-preferred result
Labor	Anne Warner	10,947	64.0	+9.8
Liberal	Heather Scantlebury	6,157	36.0	−9.8
Labor hold		Swing	+9.8	

=== South Coast ===
1989 Queensland state election: South Coast
Party	Candidate	Votes	%	±%
Labor	Constance Stern	9,394	39.1	+8.8
Liberal	Bob Quinn	6,820	28.4	+8.4
National	Judy Gamin	6,799	28.3	−21.4
Independent	David Champion	1,017	4.2	+4.2
Total formal votes		24,030	97.1	−0.9
Informal votes		728	2.9	+0.9
Turnout		24,758	89.1	+1.3
Two-party-preferred result
Liberal	Bob Quinn	13,877	57.7	+57.7
Labor	Constance Stern	10,153	42.3	+6.0
Liberal gain from National		Swing	N/A	

=== Southport ===
1989 Queensland state election: Southport
Party	Candidate	Votes	%	±%
Labor	Andrew Prenzler	6,001	32.5	+10.2
National	Mick Veivers	5,880	31.9	−19.0
Liberal	Keith Thompson	5,708	30.9	+7.4
Democrats	Eamonn Sherrard	459	2.5	−0.8
Greens	John Roe	414	2.2	+2.2
Total formal votes		18,462	96.9	−1.3
Informal votes		585	3.1	+1.3
Turnout		19,047	88.6	−0.5
Two-party-preferred result
National	Mick Veivers	11,272	61.1	−8.1
Labor	Andrew Prenzler	7,190	38.9	+8.1
National hold		Swing	−8.1	

=== Springwood ===
1989 Queensland state election: Springwood
Party	Candidate	Votes	%	±%
Labor	Molly Robson	11,436	50.2	+18.1
Liberal	Christopher Macdade	5,327	23.0	+1.8
National	Huan Fraser	5,159	22.6	+4.4
Independent	Patsybeth Ridgway	956	4.2	+4.2
Total formal votes		22,788	97.6	+0.1
Informal votes		559	2.4	−0.1
Turnout		23,347	92.3	+0.5
Two-party-preferred result
Labor	Molly Robson	12,100	53.1	+9.3
National	Huan Fraser	10,688	46.9	−9.3
Labor gain from National		Swing	+9.3	

=== Stafford ===
1989 Queensland state election: Stafford
Party	Candidate	Votes	%	±%
Labor	Rod Welford	10,004	54.4	+11.8
Liberal	Terry Gygar	5,803	31.5	+3.9
National	Robert Hutchinson	1,735	9.4	−16.9
Democrats	Gayle Woodrow	858	4.7	+1.3
Total formal votes		18,400	97.8	−0.6
Informal votes		417	2.2	+0.6
Turnout		18,817	95.2	+1.4
Two-party-preferred result
Labor	Rod Welford	10,598	57.6	+12.1
Liberal	Terry Gygar	7,802	42.4	−12.1
Labor gain from Liberal		Swing	+12.1	

=== Surfers Paradise ===
1989 Queensland state election: Surfers Paradise
Party	Candidate	Votes	%	±%
National	Rob Borbidge	4,962	33.2	−21.0
Labor	Bruce Farrell	4,771	31.9	+11.2
Liberal	John Bradford	4,707	31.5	+9.7
Independent	Selwyn Tully	512	3.4	+3.4
Total formal votes		14,952	96.8	−0.5
Informal votes		487	3.2	+0.5
Turnout		15,439	83.7	−1.6
Two-party-preferred result
National	Rob Borbidge	9,292	62.2	−9.1
Labor	Bruce Farrell	5,660	37.8	+9.1
National hold		Swing	−9.1	

=== Tablelands ===
1989 Queensland state election: Tablelands
Party	Candidate	Votes	%	±%
National	Tom Gilmore	6,518	47.8	−3.3
Labor	Fred Cattarossi	6,219	45.6	+8.3
Citizens Electoral Council	Andrew Snowdon	888	6.5	+6.5
Total formal votes		13,625	96.5	−0.7
Informal votes		500	3.5	+0.7
Turnout		12,638	90.6	+0.3
Two-party-preferred result
National	Tom Gilmore	7,142	52.4	−6.3
Labor	Fred Cattarossi	6,483	47.6	+6.3
National hold		Swing	−6.3	

=== Thuringowa ===
1989 Queensland state election: Thuringowa
Party	Candidate	Votes	%	±%
Labor	Ken McElligott	13,513	56.5	+10.9
National	Reg Fenton	6,008	25.1	−10.5
Liberal	Sandra Chesney	4,397	18.4	−0.1
Total formal votes		23,918	96.4	−1.8
Informal votes		893	3.6	+1.8
Turnout		24,811	89.0	−0.5
Two-party-preferred result
Labor	Ken McElligott	14,351	60.0	+9.3
National	Reg Fenton	9,567	40.0	−9.3
Labor hold		Swing	+9.3	

=== Toowong ===
1989 Queensland state election: Toowong
Party	Candidate	Votes	%	±%
Labor	Janelle Howe	7,964	44.9	+15.2
Liberal	Denver Beanland	7,421	41.8	+0.6
National	Rodney Hall	1,513	8.5	−20.6
Greens	Neil Kelly	856	4.8	+4.8
Total formal votes		17,754	98.0	−0.7
Informal votes		365	2.0	+0.7
Turnout		18,119	88.7	−0.5
Two-party-preferred result
Liberal	Denver Beanland	9,109	51.3	−17.1
Labor	Janelle Howe	8,645	48.7	+17.1
Liberal hold		Swing	−17.1	

=== Toowoomba North ===
1989 Queensland state election: Toowoomba North
Party	Candidate	Votes	%	±%
Labor	John Flynn	8,649	43.6	+6.0
National	Sandy McPhie	5,251	26.5	−21.0
Liberal	John Gouldson	4,636	23.4	+8.6
Independent	Vincent Burke	1,301	6.6	+6.6
Total formal votes		19,837	97.7	−0.5
Informal votes		470	2.3	+0.5
Turnout		18,571	93.0	+0.2
Two-party-preferred result
Labor	John Flynn	10,101	50.9	+8.5
National	Sandy McPhie	9,736	49.1	−8.5
Labor gain from National		Swing	+8.5	

=== Toowoomba South ===
1989 Queensland state election: Toowoomba South
Party	Candidate	Votes	%	±%
National	Clive Berghofer	8,046	41.1	−6.5
Labor	Bill Buchanan	7,179	36.7	+13.3
Liberal	John Gouldson	3,301	22.3	+3.6
Total formal votes		19,582	97.4	−1.0
Informal votes		514	2.6	+1.0
Turnout		20,096	92.8	+0.6
Two-party-preferred result
National	Clive Berghofer	11,569	59.1	−6.7
Labor	Bill Buchanan	8,013	40.9	+6.7
National hold		Swing	−6.7	

==== By-election ====
- This by-election was caused by the resignation of Clive Berghofer, who was prohibited from serving as an MLA while Mayor of Toowoomba due to a change in legislation. It was held on 18 May 1991.

1991 Toowoomba South state by-election
Party	Candidate	Votes	%	±%
National	Mike Horan	7,707	39.2	−1.9
Independent Labor	Des McGovern	6,146	31.3	+31.3
Liberal	Neville Stewart	4,478	22.8	+0.5
New Country	L. A. Kruger	856	4.4	+4.4
Independent	Vincent Burke	455	2.3	+2.3
Total formal votes		19,642	97.7	+0.3
Informal votes		463	2.3	−0.3
Turnout		20,105	86.7	−6.1
Two-candidate-preferred result
National	Mike Horan	12,374	63.0	+3.9
Independent Labor	Des McGovern	7,268	37.0	+37.0
National hold		Swing	N/A	

=== Townsville ===
1989 Queensland state election: Townsville
Party	Candidate	Votes	%	±%
Labor	Ken Davies	9,839	50.2	+11.9
National	Tony Burreket	5,171	26.4	−8.1
Liberal	James Cathcart	3,839	19.6	−4.1
Greens	Sharon Crowe	748	3.8	+3.8
Total formal votes		19,597	96.7	−1.1
Informal votes		663	3.3	+1.1
Turnout		20,260	88.1	−1.6
Two-party-preferred result
Labor	Ken Davies	10,798	55.1	+9.5
National	Tony Burreket	8,799	44.9	−9.5
Labor gain from National		Swing	+9.5	

=== Townsville East ===
1989 Queensland state election: Townsville East
Party	Candidate	Votes	%	±%
Labor	Geoff Smith	11,009	61.8	+8.8
National	Dickway Goon Chew	4,487	25.2	−5.8
Liberal	Susanne Luckel	2,313	13.0	−2.9
Total formal votes		17,809	97.0	−1.1
Informal votes		555	3.0	+1.1
Turnout		18,364	89.0	+0.1
Two-party-preferred result
Labor	Geoff Smith	11,451	64.3	+6.8
National	Dickway Goon Chew	6,358	35.7	−6.8
Labor hold		Swing	+6.8	

=== Warrego ===
1989 Queensland state election: Warrego
Party	Candidate	Votes	%	±%
National	Howard Hobbs	3,912	49.3	−4.4
Labor	Gordon Harding	3,606	45.5	−0.8
Liberal	Kevin Trueman	415	5.2	+5.2
Total formal votes		7,933	97.8	−0.3
Informal votes		177	2.2	+0.3
Turnout		8,110	90.8	−0.2
Two-party-preferred result
National	Howard Hobbs	4,226	53.3	−0.4
Labor	Gordon Harding	3,707	46.7	+0.4
National hold		Swing	−0.4	

=== Warwick ===
1989 Queensland state election: Warwick
Party	Candidate	Votes	%	±%
National	Des Booth	4,945	41.0	−31.1
Labor	Bev Brennan	3,399	28.2	+0.3
Liberal	Peter Beatty	2,032	16.9	+16.9
Independent	Bev Shelley	1,682	13.9	+13.9
Total formal votes		12,058	97.9	−0.3
Informal votes		254	2.1	+0.3
Turnout		12,312	92.6	−0.9
Two-party-preferred result
National	Des Booth	7,723	64.0	−8.1
Labor	Bev Brennan	4,335	36.0	+8.1
National hold		Swing	−8.1	

=== Whitsunday ===
1989 Queensland state election: Whitsunday
Party	Candidate	Votes	%	±%
Labor	Lorraine Bird	8,385	44.8	+6.5
National	Robert Dawson	5,510	29.4	−22.5
Liberal	Barry Gomersall	3,548	19.0	+9.2
Independent	John Egan	640	3.4	+3.4
Independent	Geoff Muntz	631	3.4	+3.4
Total formal votes		18,714	96.8	−1.6
Informal votes		623	3.2	+1.6
Turnout		19,337	91.2	+0.6
Two-party-preferred result
Labor	Lorraine Bird	9,363	50.03	+9.03
National	Robert Dawson	9,351	49.97	−9.03
Labor gain from National		Swing	+9.03	

=== Windsor ===
1989 Queensland state election: Windsor
Party	Candidate	Votes	%	±%
Labor	Pat Comben	11,468	62.3	+10.5
Liberal	Kaye Harcourt	4,742	25.8	+4.6
National	Andrew Hassall	2,196	11.9	−15.1
Total formal votes		18,406	97.4	−0.6
Informal votes		495	2.6	+0.6
Turnout		18,901	91.2	−0.2
Two-party-preferred result
Labor	Pat Comben	11,633	63.2	+5.5
Liberal	Kaye Harcourt	6,773	36.8	+36.8
Labor hold		Swing	+5.5	

=== Wolston ===
1989 Queensland state election: Wolston
Party	Candidate	Votes	%	±%
Labor	Bob Gibbs	13,574	66.9	+10.3
Liberal	Hendrik Schimmel	6,724	33.1	+8.7
Total formal votes		20,298	93.3	−2.2
Informal votes		1,466	6.7	+2.2
Turnout		21,764	90.7	−0.1
Labor hold		Swing	+9.2	

=== Woodridge ===
1989 Queensland state election: Woodridge
Party	Candidate	Votes	%	±%
Labor	Bill D'Arcy	13,504	68.7	+16.4
Liberal	Graeme Collins	3,935	20.0	+7.4
National	Tom Trethewey	2,208	11.2	−11.4
Total formal votes		19,647	95.4	−1.7
Informal votes		953	4.6	+1.7
Turnout		20,600	88.0	−0.1
Two-party-preferred result
Labor	Bill D'Arcy	13,655	69.5	+8.5
Liberal	Graeme Collins	5,992	30.5	+30.5
Labor hold		Swing	+8.5	

=== Yeronga ===
1989 Queensland state election: Yeronga
Party	Candidate	Votes	%	±%
Labor	Matt Foley	11,043	58.4	+18.1
Liberal	Cliff Dee	6,067	32.1	+2.7
National	Gordon Fisher	1,798	9.5	−14.7
Total formal votes		18,908	97.8	−0.1
Informal votes		418	2.2	+0.1
Turnout		19,326	92.0	+0.3
Two-party-preferred result
Labor	Matt Foley	11,175	59.1	+14.8
Liberal	Cliff Dee	7,733	40.9	−14.8
Labor gain from Liberal		Swing	+14.8	

== See also ==
- 1989 Queensland state election
- Members of the Queensland Legislative Assembly, 1986–1989
- Members of the Queensland Legislative Assembly, 1989–1992
- Candidates of the Queensland state election, 1989
