= Electoral results for the district of Mansfield =

Queensland, Australia, district election results

This is a list of electoral results for the electoral district of Mansfield in Queensland state elections.

== Members for Mansfield ==
Member	Party	Term
Bill Kaus	Liberal	1972–1983
Bill Kaus	National	1983–1986
Craig Sherrin	National	1986–1989
Laurel Power	Labor	1989–1995
Frank Carroll	Liberal	1995–1998
Phil Reeves	Labor	1998–2012
Ian Walker	Liberal National	2012–2017
Corrine McMillan	Labor	2017–present

== Election results ==
=== Elections in the 2020s ===
2024 Queensland state election: Mansfield
Party	Candidate	Votes	%	±%
Labor	Corrine McMillan	13,674	42.60	−3.54
Liberal National	Pinky Singh	12,237	38.12	−0.31
Greens	Wen Li	3,776	11.76	+2.16
One Nation	Katrina Coleman	1,490	4.64	+2.33
Family First	Anthony Ross Dovey	924	2.88	+2.88
Total formal votes		32,101	96.93	−0.47
Informal votes		1,017	3.07	+0.47
Turnout		33,118	90.48	+0.01
Two-party-preferred result
Labor	Corrine McMillan	17,620	54.89	−1.91
Liberal National	Pinky Singh	14,481	45.11	+1.91
Labor hold		Swing	−1.91	

2020 Queensland state election: Mansfield
Party	Candidate	Votes	%	±%
Labor	Corrine McMillan	14,256	46.14	+6.75
Liberal National	Janet Wishart	11,874	38.43	−1.77
Greens	Rob Walter	2,967	9.60	−1.70
One Nation	Christopher O'Callaghan	715	2.31	−6.80
Legalise Cannabis	Brendan Taylor	708	2.29	+2.29
Independent	Jarrod Wirth	233	0.75	+0.75
United Australia	Maria Todorova	145	0.47	+0.47
Total formal votes		30,898	97.40	+1.52
Informal votes		826	2.60	−1.52
Turnout		31,724	90.47	+1.51
Two-party-preferred result
Labor	Corrine McMillan	17,551	56.80	+5.18
Liberal National	Janet Wishart	13,347	43.20	−5.18
Labor hold		Swing	+5.18	

=== Elections in the 2010s ===
2017 Queensland state election: Mansfield
Party	Candidate	Votes	%	±%
Liberal National	Ian Walker	11,610	40.2	−5.3
Labor	Corrine McMillan	11,375	39.4	−2.3
Greens	Barbara Bell	3,263	11.3	+1.8
One Nation	Neil Symes	2,631	9.1	+9.1
Total formal votes		28,879	95.9	−2.4
Informal votes		1,243	4.1	+2.4
Turnout		30,122	89.0	−2.2
Two-party-preferred result
Labor	Corrine McMillan	14,908	51.6	+0.8
Liberal National	Ian Walker	13,971	48.4	−0.8
Labor notional hold		Swing	+0.8	

2015 Queensland state election: Mansfield
Party	Candidate	Votes	%	±%
Liberal National	Ian Walker	12,574	46.88	−6.79
Labor	Adam Obeid	10,875	40.55	+8.18
Greens	Nick Jelicic	2,476	9.23	+3.11
Independent	Jarrod Wirth	895	3.34	+2.55
Total formal votes		26,820	98.31	+0.03
Informal votes		460	1.69	−0.03
Turnout		27,280	90.59	−1.35
Two-party-preferred result
Liberal National	Ian Walker	13,113	50.55	−10.59
Labor	Adam Obeid	12,829	49.45	+10.59
Liberal National hold		Swing	−10.59	

2012 Queensland state election: Mansfield
Party	Candidate	Votes	%	±%
Liberal National	Ian Walker	13,953	53.67	+14.05
Labor	Phil Reeves	8,416	32.37	−14.91
Greens	Craig Sheehan	1,592	6.12	−0.65
Katter's Australian	Ray Smith	1,135	4.37	+4.37
Family First	Carolyn Ferrando	696	2.68	−0.78
Independent	Jarrod Wirth	206	0.79	+0.79
Total formal votes		25,998	98.28	−0.03
Informal votes		454	1.72	+0.03
Turnout		26,452	91.94	−0.47
Two-party-preferred result
Liberal National	Ian Walker	14,886	61.14	+15.53
Labor	Phil Reeves	9,462	38.86	−15.53
Liberal National gain from Labor		Swing	+15.53	

=== Elections in the 2000s ===
2009 Queensland state election: Mansfield
Party	Candidate	Votes	%	±%
Labor	Phil Reeves	12,354	47.3	−3.4
Liberal National	Adrian Hart	10,353	39.6	+4.2
Greens	Dean Love	1,768	6.8	−1.0
Family First	Jesse Webb	903	3.5	−2.4
DS4SEQ	Wendy Fitz-Gerald	751	2.9	+2.9
Total formal votes		26,129	98.2	
Informal votes		450	1.8	
Turnout		26,579	92.4	
Two-party-preferred result
Labor	Phil Reeves	13,555	54.4	−4.0
Liberal National	Adrian Hart	11,368	45.6	+4.0
Labor hold		Swing	−4.0	

2006 Queensland state election: Mansfield
Party	Candidate	Votes	%	±%
Labor	Phil Reeves	12,581	50.3	−3.6
Liberal	Glen Ryan	8,980	35.9	−2.6
Greens	Gary McMahon	1,883	7.5	−0.1
Family First	Geoff Grounds	1,576	6.3	+6.3
Total formal votes		25,020	98.2	+0.1
Informal votes		466	1.8	−0.1
Turnout		25,486	91.6	−1.3
Two-party-preferred result
Labor	Phil Reeves	13,645	57.7	−0.9
Liberal	Glen Ryan	9,992	42.3	+0.9
Labor hold		Swing	−0.9	

2004 Queensland state election: Mansfield
Party	Candidate	Votes	%	±%
Labor	Phil Reeves	13,368	53.9	+0.5
Liberal	John Olive	9,535	38.5	+3.8
Greens	Jan McNicol	1,894	7.6	+7.6
Total formal votes		24,797	98.1	−0.1
Informal votes		489	1.9	+0.1
Turnout		25,286	92.9	−1.0
Two-party-preferred result
Labor	Phil Reeves	14,067	58.6	+0.0
Liberal	John Olive	9,955	41.4	-0.0
Labor hold		Swing	+0.0	

2001 Queensland state election: Mansfield
Party	Candidate	Votes	%	±%
Labor	Phil Reeves	13,296	53.4	+12.5
Liberal	Frank Carroll	8,646	34.7	−3.0
Independent	Richard Leworthy	2,960	11.9	+11.9
Total formal votes		24,902	98.2	
Informal votes		463	1.8	
Turnout		25,365	93.9	
Two-party-preferred result
Labor	Phil Reeves	13,806	58.6	+7.9
Liberal	Frank Carroll	9,746	41.4	−7.9
Labor hold		Swing	+7.9	

=== Elections in the 1990s ===
1998 Queensland state election: Mansfield
Party	Candidate	Votes	%	±%
Labor	Phil Reeves	10,399	40.9	+2.2
Liberal	Frank Carroll	9,913	39.0	−12.9
One Nation	Michael Harris-Gahan	3,696	14.5	+14.5
Greens	Scott Alderson	817	3.2	−6.3
Democrats	Faye Carrington	625	2.5	+2.5
Total formal votes		25,450	98.8	+0.1
Informal votes		311	1.2	−0.1
Turnout		25,761	93.7	+0.6
Two-party-preferred result
Labor	Phil Reeves	12,205	50.2	+6.9
Liberal	Frank Carroll	12,122	49.8	−6.9
Labor gain from Liberal		Swing	+6.9	

1995 Queensland state election: Mansfield
Party	Candidate	Votes	%	±%
Liberal	Frank Carroll	12,020	51.9	+15.4
Labor	Laurel Power	8,958	38.6	−11.9
Greens	Lorrelle Saunders	2,202	9.5	+9.5
Total formal votes		23,180	98.7	+0.7
Informal votes		306	1.3	−0.7
Turnout		23,486	93.1	
Two-party-preferred result
Liberal	Frank Carroll	12,962	56.7	+9.3
Labor	Laurel Power	9,899	43.3	−9.3
Liberal gain from Labor		Swing	+9.3	

1992 Queensland state election: Mansfield
Party	Candidate	Votes	%	±%
Labor	Laurel Power	10,888	50.5	+3.2
Liberal	Don Cameron	7,851	36.4	+13.0
National	Glenys Head	2,823	13.1	−15.9
Total formal votes		21,562	98.0	
Informal votes		437	2.0	
Turnout		21,999	92.9	
Two-party-preferred result
Labor	Laurel Power	11,197	52.6	+0.3
Liberal	Don Cameron	10,108	47.4	+47.4
Labor hold		Swing	+0.3	

=== Elections in the 1980s ===
1989 Queensland state election: Mansfield
Party	Candidate	Votes	%	±%
Labor	Laurel Power	9,298	47.6	+10.2
National	Craig Sherrin	5,683	29.1	−7.3
Liberal	David Greig	4,557	23.3	−2.9
Total formal votes		19,538	97.5	−0.4
Informal votes		496	2.5	+0.4
Turnout		20,034	92.9	−0.2
Two-party-preferred result
Labor	Laurel Power	10,229	52.4	+7.9
National	Craig Sherrin	9,309	47.6	−7.9
Labor gain from National		Swing	+7.9	

1986 Queensland state election: Mansfield
Party	Candidate	Votes	%	±%
Labor	Nicole Stehn	6,826	37.4	−1.5
National	Craig Sherrin	6,648	36.4	−3.6
Liberal	Leo White	4,774	26.2	+6.1
Total formal votes		18,248	97.9	−0.5
Informal votes		385	2.1	+0.5
Turnout		18,633	93.1	−0.1
Two-party-preferred result
National	Craig Sherrin	10,126	55.5	+0.4
Labor	Nicole Stehn	8,122	44.5	−0.4
National hold		Swing	+0.4	

1983 Queensland state election: Mansfield
Party	Candidate	Votes	%	±%
National	Bill Kaus	7,615	40.0	+40.0
Labor	Norma Jones	7,402	38.9	−1.1
Liberal	Gregory Goebel	3,827	20.1	−34.8
Progress	Desmond McKay	175	0.9	−4.2
Total formal votes		19,019	98.8	+0.3
Informal votes		226	1.2	−0.3
Turnout		19,245	93.2	+2.7
Two-party-preferred result
National	Bill Kaus	10,677	56.1	+56.1
Labor	Norma Jones	8,342	43.9	+2.2
National gain from Liberal		Swing	N/A	

1980 Queensland state election: Mansfield
Party	Candidate	Votes	%	±%
Liberal	Bill Kaus	9,374	54.9	−1.9
Labor	John Fraser	6,819	40.0	+5.1
Progress	Des McKay	876	5.1	−3.2
Total formal votes		17,069	98.5	0.0
Informal votes		238	1.5	0.0
Turnout		17,335	90.5	−2.1
Two-party-preferred result
Liberal	Bill Kaus	9,943	58.3	−4.3
Labor	John Fraser	7,126	41.7	+4.3
Liberal hold		Swing	−4.3	

=== Elections in the 1970s ===
1977 Queensland state election: Mansfield
Party	Candidate	Votes	%	±%
Liberal	Bill Kaus	8,648	56.8	−12.5
Labor	Harry Zaphir	5,306	34.9	+7.7
Progress	John McKay	1,261	8.3	+8.3
Total formal votes		15,215	98.5	
Informal votes		238	1.5	
Turnout		15,453	92.6	
Two-party-preferred result
Liberal	Bill Kaus	9,531	62.6	−8.6
Labor	Harry Zaphir	5,684	37.4	+8.6
Liberal hold		Swing	−8.6	

1974 Queensland state election: Mansfield
Party	Candidate	Votes	%	±%
Liberal	Bill Kaus	11,945	69.3	+24.5
Labor	Desmond Rowland	4,687	27.2	−18.8
Queensland Labor	Lionel Lane	612	3.6	−4.3
Total formal votes		17,244	98.5	+0.3
Informal votes		266	1.5	−0.3
Turnout		17,510	90.7	−3.4
Two-party-preferred result
Liberal	Bill Kaus	12,454	72.2	+20.2
Labor	Desmond Rowland	4,790	27.8	−20.2
Liberal hold		Swing	+20.2	

1972 Queensland state election: Mansfield
Party	Candidate	Votes	%	±%
Labor	Raymond Lynch	6,358	46.0	
Liberal	Bill Kaus	6,193	44.8	
Queensland Labor	John Thompson	1,094	7.9	
Independent	William Kenney	187	1.4	
Total formal votes		13,832	98.2	
Informal votes		251	1.8	
Turnout		14,083	94.1	
Two-party-preferred result
Liberal	Bill Kaus	7,198	52.0	+0.7
Labor	Raymond Lynch	6,634	48.0	−0.7
Liberal hold		Swing	+0.7	
