= Candidates of the 1989 Queensland state election =

The 1989 Queensland state election was held on 2 December 1989.

== By-elections ==
- On 20 June 1987, Mick Veivers (National) was elected to succeed Doug Jennings (National), who had died on 9 April 1987, as the member for Southport.
- On 16 April 1988, Trevor Perrett (CEC) was elected to succeed former Premier Joh Bjelke-Petersen (National), who had resigned on 1 December 1987, as the member for Barambah. Perrett joined the Nationals in December 1988.
- On 20 August 1988, Judy Gamin (National) was elected to succeed Russ Hinze (National), who had resigned on 24 May 1988, as the member for South Coast.
- On 13 May 1989, Santo Santoro (Liberal) was elected to succeed Don Lane (National), who had resigned on 20 January 1989, as the member for Merthyr.
- On 31 July 1989, Lin Powell (Independent) resigned as the member for Isis. No by-election was held due to the proximity of the election.

== Retiring Members ==
=== Labor ===
- Brian Davis (Brisbane Central)
- Bob Scott (Cook)
- David Underwood (Ipswich West)
- Les Yewdale (Rockhampton North)

=== Liberal ===
- Norm Lee (Yeronga)
- Bill Lickiss (Moggill)

=== National ===
- Brian Austin (Nicklin)
- Bill Glasson (Gregory)
- Peter McKechnie (Carnarvon)
- Ted Row (Hinchinbrook)
- Gordon Simpson (Cooroora)
- Martin Tenni (Barron River)

=== Independent ===
- Eric Shaw (Manly) — elected for the Labor Party

== Legislative Assembly ==
Sitting members at the time of the election are shown in bold text.

Electorate	Held by	Labor candidate	Liberal candidate	National candidate	Other candidates
Albert	National	John Szczerbanik	Kay Elson	**Ivan Gibbs**	John Ivory (AAP)
Archerfield	Labor	**Henry Palaszczuk**	Gordon Morris	Mark Goodin	
Ashgrove	Liberal	Jim Fouras	**Alan Sherlock**	John Giles	Garry Renshaw (Ind); Stephen Woolcock (Ind)
Aspley	National	Noela Pemberton	John Goss	**Beryce Nelson**	Eric Raetz (CTA); Ian Webster (Ind)
Auburn	National	Tom Hall		**Neville Harper**	Maurice Hetherington (Ind)
Balonne	National	Barrie Ryan		**Don Neal**	John Ellem (BAM); Allen Tinkler (Ind)
Barambah	CEC	John Lang	Bill Walters	**Trevor Perrett**	Craig Isherwood (CEC)
Barron River	National	Lesley Clark	David Forehead	Peter Dunn	
Bowen	Labor	**Ken Smyth**		Trevor Maltby	Jo Cronin (Ind)
Brisbane Central	Labor	Peter Beattie	John Peeters	Justin Choveaux	Ranald McDonald (Grn Ind)
Broadsound	National	Jim Pearce	Howard Rodda	**Denis Hinton**	Jim O'Brien (Ind); Les White (CEC)
Bulimba	Labor	**Ron McLean**	Alvan Hawkes	Judith Brown	
Bundaberg	Labor	**Clem Campbell**	Peter MacSween	Mary Ann Walsh	Lin Myles (GP)
Burdekin	National	Don Wallace	Anthony Chandler	**Mark Stoneman**	
Burnett	National	Vicki Pritchett	Alex Warren	**Doug Slack**	Maurice Chapman (Ind)
Caboolture	Labor	**Ken Hayward**	Bob O'Sullivan	Roy Rogers	Raymond De Gruchy (CTA); Ron Fenton (Ind); James Kessels (Ind)
Cairns	Labor	**Keith De Lacy**		Wally Scholtens	
Callide	National	Greg Clair		**Di McCauley**	
Carnarvon	National	Maurice Passmore	Ruth Buchanan	Lawrence Springborg	Graham Caslick (Ind); Jim Smith (Ind)
Chatsworth	Labor	**Terry Mackenroth**	Jack Butler	David Stone	
Condamine	National	Bill Murphy		**Brian Littleproud**	
Cook	Labor	Steve Bredhauer	Bill Rutherford	Lester Rosendale	James Akee (Ind); David Byrne (Ind); Norman Johnson (Ind); Dan Paterson (Ind)
Cooroora	National	Ray Barber	Allen Low	Robin Priebe	Joseph Roach (Ind)
Cunningham	National	Noel Payne	Malcolm Wilson	**Tony Elliott**	
Currumbin	National	Michael Batkin	Trevor Coomber	**Leo Gately**	John Moreland (Dem)
Everton	Labor	**Glen Milliner**	Greg Smith	Peter Kuskie	
Fassifern	National	Don Petersen	Margaret Grevett	**Kev Lingard**	Lawrence Hawkins (CEC); Clyde Willis (CEC)
Flinders	National	Noel Robertson	Owen Pershouse	**Bob Katter**	Harrison Duncan (Ind); Beryl Hunter (Ind)
Glass House	National	Jon Sullivan	Errol Johnston	**Bill Newton**	Rona Joyner (CTA); Glen Spicer (Dem)
Greenslopes	National	Gary Fenlon	Graham Young	**Leisha Harvey**	Richard Tiainen (Ind)
Gregory	National	Robert Nilon	Dudley Church	Vaughan Johnson	Leo Baird (Ind); Alan Barton (Ind)
Gympie	National	Geoffrey Brown	Bruce Kean	**Len Stephan**	Lewis Blayse (UPP); Bruce Chapman (Ind); Adrian McClintock (Ind)
Hinchinbrook	National	George Day	Antonino Cardillo	Marc Rowell	Ron Dunn (Ind)
Ipswich	Labor	**David Hamill**	Ian Vagg		Don McNabb (Ind)
Ipswich West	Labor	Don Livingstone	Ken Clift		
Isis	National	Bill Nunn	Fred Kleinschmidt	Bob Kerr	Lin Powell (Ind)
Landsborough	National	Francis Bowyer	Garnet Ross	**Mike Ahern**	Santo Ferraro (CI)
Lockyer	National	Marie Klajn	Fabius Manners	**Tony Fitzgerald**	Bryan Greenham (Ind); Peter McKinlay (Ind)
Logan	Labor	**Wayne Goss**	Peter Carroll	Wayne Robertson	
Lytton	Labor	**Tom Burns**	Peter Dutton	Victor Sirl	
Mackay	Labor	**Ed Casey**	Gary Kennedy	Greg Williamson	Trevor Dempster (Ind)
Manly	Labor	Jim Elder	Verlie Farrell	Paul Asher	Barry Cullen (AAP); Bob George (Dem)
Mansfield	National	Laurel Power	David Greig	**Craig Sherrin**	
Maryborough	National	Bob Dollin	Kevin Mahoney	**Gilbert Alison**	Camillo Primavera (CEC)
Merthyr	Liberal	Barbara Dawson	**Santo Santoro**	Pat Kelly	
Mirani	National	David Robinson	Bevin Coleman	**Jim Randell**	
Moggill	Liberal	Robyn Campbell	David Watson	Trevor St Baker	James Fredericks (Grn Ind)
Mount Coot-tha	Liberal	Wendy Edmond	**Lyle Schuntner**	Geoff Colless	Myron Loving (Grn Ind)
Mount Gravatt	National	Judy Spence	Guelfi Scassola	**Ian Henderson**	
Mount Isa	Liberal	Tony McGrady	**Peter Beard**	Stephen Wollaston	
Mourilyan	Labor	**Bill Eaton**		Malcolm Taylor	Philip Condon (Ind)
Mulgrave	National	Warren Pitt		**Max Menzel**	
Murrumba	Labor	**Deane Wells**	Patrick Seeney	Phil Benson	
Nerang	National	Robert Lee	Ray Connor	**Tom Hynd**	Harry Howard (Ind)
Nicklin	National	Ian Matthews	Bob King	Neil Turner	Keith Bartholomew (Ind); Bob Borsellino (Dem); Cecil Hamley (Ind); Judith Jackson (Con)
Nudgee	Labor	**Ken Vaughan**	Ronald Nightingale	Charles Allsop	
Nundah	Liberal	Phil Heath	**William Knox**	Russell Parry	
Peak Downs	National	Paul Bell		**Vince Lester**	Robert Reinke (CEC)
Pine Rivers	National	Margaret Woodgate	Rob Akers; Graham Harris	**Yvonne Chapman**	Trevor Campbell (Ind); John Kennedy (Ind)
Port Curtis	Labor	**Bill Prest**		Ron Streeter	Eric Bailey (Ind); Kevin Meyrick (Ind)
Redcliffe	Liberal	Ray Hollis	**Terry White**	Robert Quinn	Jenny Ballantine-Morris (Ind)
Redlands	National	Darryl Briskey	Edward Santagiuliana	**Paul Clauson**	Leo Grace (Ind); Geoff Speakman (Dem)
Rockhampton	Labor	**Paul Braddy**		Barry Such	
Rockhampton North	Labor	Robert Schwarten	Alan Cornick	Lee Nevison	Len Clampett (CEC); John Harding (CEC)
Roma	National	Ray Johanson		**Russell Cooper**	
Salisbury	Labor	**Len Ardill**	Richard Iliff	Ross Adams	
Sandgate	Labor	**Nev Warburton**	Ronald Nankervis	Stephen Purtill	
Sherwood	Liberal	Peter Pyke	**Angus Innes**		
Somerset	National	Lyn Kally	Neil Zabel	**Bill Gunn**	Jean Bray (Ind); Rob Lucas (Ind); Noel Qualischefski (Ind)
South Brisbane	Labor	**Anne Warner**	Heather Scantlebury	Peter Peters	Drew Hutton (Grn Ind)
South Coast	National	Constance Stern	Bob Quinn	**Judy Gamin**	David Champion (Ind)
Southport	National	Andrew Prenzler	Keith Thompson	**Mick Veivers**	John Roe (Grn Ind); Eamonn Sherrard (Dem)
Springwood	National	Molly Robson	Christopher Macdade	**Huan Fraser**	Patsybeth Ridgway (Ind)
Stafford	Liberal	Rod Welford	**Terry Gygar**	Robert Hutchinson	Gayle Woodrow (Dem)
Surfers Paradise	National	Bruce Farrell	John Bradford	**Rob Borbidge**	Selwyn Tully (Ind)
Tablelands	National	Alfredo Cattarossi		**Tom Gilmore**	Andrew Snowdon (CEC)
Thuringowa	Labor	**Ken McElligott**	Sandra Chesney	Reg Fenton	
Toowong	National	Janelle Howe	**Denver Beanland**	Rodney Hall	Neil Kelly (Grn Ind)
Toowoomba North	National	John Flynn	John Gouldson	**Sandy McPhie**	Vincent Burke (Ind)
Toowoomba South	National	Bill Buchanan	Neville Stewart	**Clive Berghofer**	
Townsville	National	Ken Davies	James Cathcart	**Tony Burreket**	Sharon Crowe (Grn Ind)
Townsville East	Labor	**Geoff Smith**	Susanne Luckel	Dickway Goon Chew	
Warrego	National	Gordon Harding	Kevin Trueman	**Howard Hobbs**	
Warwick	National	Bev Brennan	Peter Beatty	**Des Booth**	Bev Shelley (Ind)
Whitsunday	National	Lorraine Bird	Barry Gomersall	Robert Dawson	John Egan (Ind); **Geoff Muntz** (Ind)
Windsor	Labor	**Pat Comben**	Kaye Harcourt	Andrew Hassall	
Wolston	Labor	**Bob Gibbs**	Hendrik Schimmel		
Woodridge	Labor	**Bill D'Arcy**	Graeme Collins	Tom Trethewey	
Yeronga	Liberal	Matt Foley	Cliff Dee	Gordon Fisher	

== See also ==
- 1989 Queensland state election
- Members of the Queensland Legislative Assembly, 1986–1989
- Members of the Queensland Legislative Assembly, 1989–1992
- List of political parties in Australia
