= 1989 Queensland state election =

- 2 December 1989

All 89 seats in the Legislative Assembly of Queensland 45 Assembly seats were needed for a majority
- Registered: 1,780,785 ▲13.9%
- Turnout: 1,623,637 (91.18%) (▼0.07 pp)
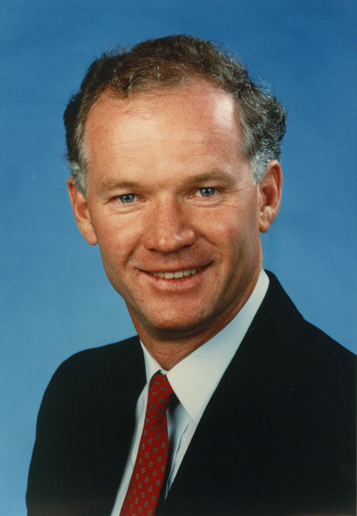

	First party	Second party	Third party
Leader	Wayne Goss	Russell Cooper	Angus Innes
Party	Labor	National	Liberal
Leader since	2 March 1988	25 September 1989	31 January 1988
Leader's seat	Logan	Roma	Sherwood
Last election	30 seats, 41.35%	49 seats, 39.64%	10 seats, 16.50%
Seats before	29 seats (Note: Manly MP Eric Shaw was elected at the previous election as a Labor candidate. However, in September 1988 he lost his party's endorsement and sat in Parliament as an independent MP.)	46 seats (Note: At the May 1989 Merthyr by-election, Liberal candidate Santo Santoro won the seat of Merthyr, which had been held by National MP Don Lane. Lane resigned his seat several months earlier following the Fitzgerald Inquiry.) (Note: The seat of Isis had been vacated on 31 July 1989 by National-turned-Independent MP Lionel Powell. There was no resulting by-election, instead the seat was contested at the state election. The seat was subsequently won by the Labor Party.)	11 seats
Seats won	54 seats	27 seats	8 seats
Seat change	▲25	▼19	▼3
Popular vote	792,466	379,364	331,562
Percentage	50.32%	24.09%	21.05%
Swing	▲8.97 pp	▼15.55 pp	▲4.55 pp
TPP	53.8%	46.2%
TPP swing	▲7.80 pp	▼7.80 pp
- Winning margin by electorate.
Premier before election
Russell Cooper
National
Elected Premier
Wayne Goss
Labor

The 1989 Queensland state election was held in the Australian state of Queensland on 2 December 1989 to elect the 89 members of the state's Legislative Assembly. This was the first election following the downfall of eight-term premier Sir Joh Bjelke-Petersen at the end of 1987.

The government was led by Premier and leader of the National Party, Russell Cooper; the opposition was led by Opposition Leader and leader of the Labor Party, Wayne Goss, while the Liberal Party was led by Angus Innes.

The National government, which had been in power since the 1957 election and had governed in its own right since the dissolution of the state coalition at the 1983 election, was defeated; the election was a landslide win for the Labor Party, which gained 24 seats. Labor also won more than 50% of the primary vote. Until 2012, it was the worst defeat of a sitting government in Queensland history.

Since this election, Queensland Labor has won 10 of 12 state elections which have been held afterwards, most recently in 2020.

== Background ==
The Nationals' fortunes had dwindled significantly since the 1986 election. Soon after the floundering of his attempt to become Prime Minister in the "Joh for Canberra" campaign, Bjelke-Petersen was deposed in a party room coup led by Health Minister Mike Ahern. After trying to hold onto power for four days, Bjelke-Petersen resigned and Ahern was sworn in as his successor.

The shadow campaign began in late 1988 with television advertisements depicting Labor and its leader, Wayne Goss, as "The Only Change for the Better". A string of policy papers were released on a range of themes emphasising responsible economic management and efficient, honest administration. While they maintained a positive and professional public opinion and consistently led opinion polls, neither the media nor the electorate appeared to believe they could win.

The Liberals, who had been on the crossbenches since the collapse of the Coalition in 1983, launched a series of newspaper advertisements in March 1988 under the banner "Let's Put It Right". They were in a curious position, however, because a collapse in National support in urban South East Queensland would mean that seats the Liberal Party might hope to win would be more likely to go to Labor.

Enrolment by electorate in 1989. The state was divided into four zones with different quotas, which overrepresented rural areas compared to the more populous southeast.

On 1 April 1989, a non-partisan group called "Citizens for Democracy" gained some publicity by cutting a birthday cake to commemorate the 40th anniversary of the Electoral Districts Act 1949, which had established electoral malapportionment in Queensland, which was seen as unfairly benefiting the Nationals. Both the Labor and Liberal parties favoured "one vote one value" electoral reform.

On 3 July 1989, the Commission of Inquiry into Possible Illegal Activities and Associated Police Misconduct (more commonly known as the Fitzgerald Inquiry after its chair, Tony Fitzgerald QC) handed down its report. It found links between criminal and political networks, and that corruption in Queensland's public life was widespread, commonplace and organised. It made numerous recommendations aimed at reforming the police and criminal justice system and at establishing independent institutions to monitor, report and act on reforms in the short term, and their operation on an ongoing basis. Ahern committed to implement the Report in its entirety.

Ahern sought to govern in a more consultative manner than Bjelke-Petersen, and worked to blunt the edges of what had long been one of the most unyieldingly conservative state governments in Australia. It was to no avail; by September, opinion polls were suggesting the Nationals had about half the support they had achieved at the 1986 election.

A Newspoll taken after the inquiry's release showed that the Nationals had tumbled to only 22% support, the lowest ever recorded for a sitting government in Australian history. Additionally, the Nationals suffered large swings at three by-elections, most recently in Merthyr, where the Liberals had won the seat from the Nationals despite the latter putting forward a high-profile candidate and an expensive campaign. On 22 September, Police Minister Russell Cooper toppled Ahern in a party room coup, and was sworn in as premier three days later. Cooper billed himself as a traditionalist in Bjelke-Petersen's mould, and his supporters believed he could shore up National support in its rural heartland.

Accordingly, Cooper campaigned on traditional National focuses (law and order, social conservatism, and attacks on the federal Labor government, in particular related to interest rates) and produced a number of controversial advertisements, one of which alleged that the Labor Opposition's plan to decriminalise homosexuality would lead to a flood of gays from southern states moving to Queensland. Labor responded by satirising these ads, depicting Cooper as a wild-eyed reactionary and a clone of Bjelke-Petersen and/or a puppet of party president Sir Robert Sparkes.

Logos Foundation, a fundamentalist Christian group in Toowoomba, led by Howard Carter, controversially involved itself in the election, running a campaign of surveys and full-page newspaper advertisements promoting the view that candidates' adherence to Christian principles and biblical ethics was more important than the widespread corruption in the Queensland government that had been revealed by the Fitzgerald Inquiry. Advertisements published in the Brisbane Courier-Mail promoted strongly-conservative positions in opposition to pornography, homosexuality and Abortion, and a return to the Death penalty. Some supporters controversially advocated Old Testament laws and penalties. That action backfired sensationally, with many mainstream Churches, community leaders and religious organisations distancing themselves from the Logos Foundation after making public statements denouncing them. At times, the death penalty for homosexuals was advocated, in accordance with Old Testament Law. A Sydney Morning Herald article summarised the campaign's thrust as follows: "Homosexuality and censorship should determine your vote, the electorate was told; corruption was not the major concern." The same article quoted from a letter Carter he had written to supporters at the time: "The greenies, the gays and the greedy are marching. Now the Christians, the conservatives and the concerned must march also". Those views were not new. In reference to the call for the Death penalty for homosexuals to rid Queensland of such people, an earlier article published in the Herald quoted a Logos spokesman as saying: "the fact a law is on the statutes is the best safeguard for society".

== Key dates ==
Date	Event
2 November 1989	The Parliament was dissolved.
2 November 1989	Writs were issued by the Governor to proceed with an election.
9 November 1989	Close of nominations.
2 December 1989	Polling day, between the hours of 8am and 6pm.
7 December 1989	The Cooper Ministry resigned and the Goss Ministry was sworn in.
13 February 1990	The writ was returned and the results formally declared.

== Retiring members ==
=== Labor ===
- Brian Davis (Brisbane Central)
- Bob Scott (Cook)
- David Underwood (Ipswich West)
- Les Yewdale (Rockhampton North)

=== Liberal ===
- Norm Lee (Yeronga)
- Bill Lickiss (Moggill)

=== National ===
- Brian Austin (Nicklin)
- Bill Glasson (Gregory)
- Peter McKechnie (Carnarvon)
- Ted Row (Hinchinbrook)
- Gordon Simpson (Cooroora)
- Martin Tenni (Barron River)

=== Independent ===
- Eric Shaw (Manly) – elected for the Labor Party

== Results ==
This, December 2, 1989, is the end of the Bjelke-Petersen era.

— Wayne Goss, election night victory speech, 2 December 1989

The result was a landslide win for the Labor Party. Brisbane swung over dramatically to support Labor, which took all but five seats in the capital.

Initially, it appeared that the Liberal Party had won the traditionally National hinterland seat of Nicklin, however, the Court of Disputed Returns overturned that result and awarded the seat to the National Party.

Queensland state election, 2 December 1989 Legislative Assembly << 1986–1992 >>
Enrolled voters	1,780,785				
Votes cast	1,623,637		Turnout	91.18%	–0.07%
Informal votes	48,764		Informal	3.00%	+0.83%
Summary of votes by party
Party	Primary votes	%	Swing	Seats	Change
Labor	792,466	50.32%	+8.97%	54	+24
Nationals	379,364	24.09%	–15.55%	27	–22
Liberal	331,562	21.05%	+4.55%	8	–2
Democrats	6,669	0.42%	–0.21%	0	±0
Citizens Electoral Council	6,610	0.42%	+0.42%	0	±0
Greens	5,206	0.33%	+0.33%	0	±0
Call to Australia	2,007	0.13%	+0.13%	0	±0
Grey Power	300	0.02%	+0.02%	0	±0
Independent	50,689	3.22%	+1.34%	0	±0
Total	1,574,873			89	
Two-party-preferred
Labor		53.8%	+7.8%		
National/Liberal		46.2%	-7.8%		

Popular vote
Labor	50.32%
Nationals	24.09%
Liberal	21.05%
Democrats	0.42%
CEC	0.42%
Greens	0.33%
Call to Australia	0.13%
Grey Power	0.02%
Independents	3.22%

Seats
Labor	60.67%
Nationals	30.34%
Liberal	8.99%

== Seats changing hands ==
Seat	1986 Election			Swing	1989 Election		
Seat	Party	Member	Margin	Swing	Margin	Member	Party
Albert	National	Ivan Gibbs	13.13	–22.82	9.69	John Szczerbanik	Labor
Ashgrove	Liberal	Alan Sherlock	0.98	–7.58	6.60	Jim Fouras	Labor
Aspley	National	Beryce Nelson	4.11	–5.29	1.18	John Goss	Liberal
Barron River	National	Martin Tenni	4.04	–11.54	7.50	Dr Lesley Clark	Labor
Broadsound	National	Denis Hinton	1.96	–4.71	2.74	Jim Pearce	Labor
Cooroora	National	Gordon Simpson	10.64	–11.67	1.03	Ray Barber	Labor
Currumbin	National	Leo Gately	8.88	–9.79	0.91	Trevor Coomber	Liberal
Glass House	National	Bill Newton	6.93	–8.55	1.63	Jon Sullivan	Labor
Greenslopes	National	Leisha Harvey	4.23	–9.83	5.60	Gary Fenlon	Labor
Isis	National	Lin Powell^{1}	7.40	–7.47	0.08	Bill Nunn	Labor
Mansfield	National	Craig Sherrin	5.49	–7.85	2.35	Laurel Power	Labor
Maryborough	National	Gilbert Alison	0.74	–2.14	1.40	Bob Dollin	Labor
Mount Coot-tha	Liberal	Lyle Schuntner	6.20	–13.21	7.00	Wendy Edmond	Labor
Mount Gravatt	National	Ian Henderson	6.69	–8.40	1.70	Judy Spence	Labor
Mount Isa	Liberal	Peter Beard	2.74	–12.84	10.10	Tony McGrady	Labor
Mulgrave	National	Max Menzel	3.71	–5.38	1.67	Warren Pitt	Labor
Nerang	National	Tom Hynd	9.88	–11.30	1.42	Ray Connor	Liberal
Nicklin	National	Brian Austin	10.93	–19.22	8.29	Bob King	Liberal
Nundah	Liberal	Sir William Knox	5.39	–13.38	8.00	Phil Heath	Labor
Pine Rivers	National	Yvonne Chapman	3.55	–9.15	5.60	Margaret Woodgate	Labor
Redcliffe	Liberal	Terry White	7.71	–9.70	2.00	Ray Hollis	Labor
Redlands	National	Paul Clauson	3.83	–10.03	6.20	Darryl Briskey	Labor
South Coast	National	Judy Gamin	0.38	–8.13	7.75	Bob Quinn	Liberal
Springwood	National	Huan Fraser	6.18	–9.28	3.10	Molly Robson	Labor
Stafford	Liberal	Terry Gygar	4.46	–12.06	7.60	Rod Welford	Labor
Toowoomba North	National	Sandy McPhie	7.62	–8.54	0.92	Dr John Flynn	Labor
Townsville	National	Tony Burreket	4.43	–9.53	5.10	Ken Davies	Labor
Whitsunday	National	Geoff Muntz^{1}	9.00	–9.03	0.03	Lorraine Bird	Labor
Yeronga	Liberal	Norm Lee	5.70	–14.80	9.10	Matt Foley	Labor

- Members listed in italics did not contest their seat at this election.
- ^{1} Lin Powell and Geoff Muntz were elected as members of the National Party, but resigned from the party, and contested the election as independents.
- The Labor Party also retained the electorate of Manly, where the sitting Labor member had resigned and contested the election as an independent.

== Post-election pendulum ==
Labor seats (54)
Marginal
Whitsunday	Lorraine Bird	ALP	0.03%
Isis	Bill Nunn	ALP	0.08%
Toowoomba North	John Flynn	ALP	0.92%
Cooroora	Ray Barber	ALP	1.03%
Maryborough	Bob Dollin	ALP	1.40%
Glass House	Jon Sullivan	ALP	1.63%
Mulgrave	Warren Pitt	ALP	1.67%
Mount Gravatt	Judy Spence	ALP	1.70%
Redcliffe	Ray Hollis	ALP	2.00%
Mansfield	Laurel Power	ALP	2.35%
Broadsound	Jim Pearce	ALP	2.74%
Springwood	Molly Robson	ALP	3.10%
Townsville	Ken Davies	ALP	5.10%
Greenslopes	Gary Fenlon	ALP	5.60%
Pine Rivers	Margaret Woodgate	ALP	5.60%
Fairly Safe
Redlands	Darryl Briskey	ALP	6.20%
Ashgrove	Jim Fouras	ALP	6.60%
Mount Coot-tha	Wendy Edmond	ALP	7.00%
Barron River	Lesley Clark	ALP	7.50%
Stafford	Rod Welford	ALP	7.60%
Nundah	Phil Heath	ALP	8.00%
Mourilyan	Bill Eaton	ALP	8.20%
Salisbury	Len Ardill	ALP	8.50%
Rockhampton North	Robert Schwarten	ALP	8.60%
Cook	Steve Bredhauer	ALP	8.90%
Yeronga	Matt Foley	ALP	9.10%
Albert	John Szczerbanik	ALP	9.69%
Safe
Thuringowa	Ken McElligott	ALP	10.00%
Mount Isa	Tony McGrady	ALP	10.10%
Bundaberg	Clem Campbell	ALP	10.40%
Mackay	Ed Casey	ALP	10.90%
Caboolture	Ken Hayward	ALP	11.20%
Chatsworth	Terry Mackenroth	ALP	12.00%
Ipswich West	Don Livingstone	ALP	12.06%
Murrumba	Dean Wells	ALP	12.70%
Cairns	Keith De Lacy	ALP	12.92%
South Brisbane	Anne Warner	ALP	13.15%
Everton	Glen Milliner	ALP	13.20%
Windsor	Pat Comben	ALP	13.20%
Rockhampton	Paul Braddy	ALP	13.77%
Manly	Jim Elder	ALP	14.00%
Townsville East	Geoff Smith	ALP	14.30%
Port Curtis	Bill Prest	ALP	16.70%
Wolston	Bob Gibbs	ALP	16.87%
Sandgate	Nev Warburton	ALP	17.30%
Ipswich	David Hamill	ALP	17.80%
Brisbane Central	Peter Beattie	ALP	18.20%
Logan	Wayne Goss	ALP	18.20%
Nudgee	Ken Vaughan	ALP	18.60%
Bulimba	Ron McLean	ALP	19.00%
Woodridge	Bill D'Arcy	ALP	19.50%
Very Safe
Bowen	Ken Smyth	ALP	20.60%
Lytton	Tom Burns	ALP	22.50%
Archerfield	Henry Palaszczuk	ALP	24.30%

National seats (26)
Marginal
Cunningham	Tony Elliott	NAT	1.13% v LIB
Hinchinbrook	Marc Rowell	NAT	1.42%
Flinders	Bob Katter	NAT	2.11%
Tablelands	Tom Gilmore	NAT	2.42%
Fassifern	Kev Lingard	NAT	2.60%
Warrego	Howard Hobbs	NAT	3.27%
Mirani	Jim Randell	NAT	3.51%
Somerset	Bill Gunn	NAT	3.96%
Callide	Di McCauley	NAT	4.29%
Landsborough	Mike Ahern	NAT	5.92%
Fairly Safe
Gregory	Vaughan Johnson	NAT	6.80%
Burdekin	Mark Stoneman	NAT	6.91%
Gympie	Len Stephan	NAT	6.99%
Carnarvon	Lawrence Springborg	NAT	8.88%
Toowoomba South	Clive Berghofer	NAT	9.08%
Peak Downs	Vince Lester	NAT	9.50%
Auburn	Neville Harper	NAT	9.63%
Safe
Southport	Mick Veivers	NAT	11.06%
Burnett	Doug Slack	NAT	11.10%
Surfers Paradise	Rob Borbidge	NAT	12.15%
Warwick	Des Booth	NAT	14.05%
Lockyer	Tony Fitzgerald	NAT	18.30%
Very Safe
Barambah	Trevor Perrett	NAT	21.40%
Roma	Russell Cooper	NAT	23.19%
Balonne	Don Neal	NAT	23.90%
Condamine	Brian Littleproud	NAT	25.42%
Liberal seats (9)
Marginal
Merthyr	Santo Santoro	LIB	0.46%
Currumbin	Trevor Coomber	LIB	0.91%
Aspley	John Goss	LIB	1.18%
Toowong	Denver Beanland	LIB	1.31%
Nerang	Ray Connor	LIB	1.42%
Sherwood	Angus Innes	LIB	3.86%
Fairly Safe
Moggill	David Watson	LIB	5.99%
South Coast	Bob Quinn	LIB	7.75%
Nicklin	Bob King	LIB	8.29%

== Subsequent changes ==
- On 6 May 1990, former National Premier Mike Ahern (Landsborough) resigned. At the by-election on 28 July 1990, Joan Sheldon gained the seat for the Liberal Party.
- On 13 May 1990, former Liberal Party leader Angus Innes (Sherwood) resigned. At the by-election on 28 July 1990, David Dunworth retained the seat for the Liberal Party.
- On 22 Nov 1990, the Court of Disputed Returns declared the election in Nicklin void, and a recount was undertaken, which declared Neil Turner for the National Party elected.
- On 18 May 1991, National Party member Clive Berghofer (Toowoomba South) resigned. At the by-election on 18 May 1991, Mike Horan retained the seat for the National Party.
- On 5 April 1991, Labor Party member Phil Heath (Nundah) resigned. At the by-election on 18 May 1991, Terry Sullivan retained the seat for the Labor Party.

A major change to electoral legislation saw the zonal system of electoral distribution abolished in favour of a system largely resembling one vote one value in time for the 1992 state election.

== See also ==
- Members of the Queensland Legislative Assembly, 1986–1989
- Members of the Queensland Legislative Assembly, 1989–1992
- Candidates of the Queensland state election, 1989
- Cooper Ministry
- Goss Ministry
