= 1992 Queensland state election =

Australian state elections; won by Labor

- 19 September 1992

All 89 seats in the Legislative Assembly of Queensland 45 Assembly seats were needed for a majority
- Turnout: 91.48 (▲0.30 pp)
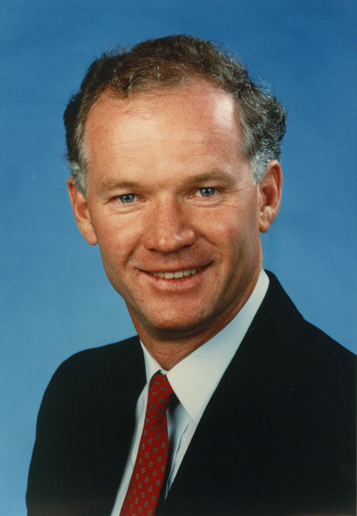

	First party	Second party	Third party
Leader	Wayne Goss	Rob Borbidge	Joan Sheldon
Party	Labor	National	Liberal
Leader since	2 March 1988	11 December 1991	11 November 1991
Leader's seat	Logan	Surfers Paradise	Caloundra
Last election	54 seats, 50.32%	27 seats, 24.09%	8 seats, 21.05%
Seats won	54	26	9
Seat change	Steady	▼1	▲1
Popular vote	850,480	413,772	356,640
Percentage	48.73%	23.71%	20.44%
Swing	▼1.59	▼0.38	▼0.62
TPP	53.7%	46.3%
TPP swing	▼0.10	▲0.10
Premier before election
Wayne Goss
Labor
Elected Premier
Wayne Goss
Labor

Elections were held in the Australian state of Queensland on 19 September 1992 to elect the 89 members of the state's Legislative Assembly.

The Labor Party led by Wayne Goss was reelected for a second term with a strong majority government. The election effectively confirmed the status quo, although the ALP lost a small percentage of votes and four seats. Three of those were new seats which were nominally Labor following the redistribution.

This was the first election in many decades in which a zonal system of electoral representation did not exist. The previous parliament had legislated for a "one vote one value" electoral redistribution, in which almost all the 89 electoral districts were to have similar numbers of electors (within a 10% margin of the mean). The only exceptions were electorates that had areas of at least 100,000 square kilometres. The number of electors in each of those electorates was increased by 2% of the total area of the electorate expressed in square kilometres, to ensure that the number of electors in the affected electorates was within 10% of the mean enrolment. This election also saw the introduction of optional preferential voting (replacing compulsory full-preferential voting) in Queensland elections, which would remain in place until the 2016 electoral reforms of the Palaszczuk government.

Although Labor suffered a small swing against it in north Queensland, that was slightly masked by the abolition of the zonal system.

== Key dates ==
Date	Event
25 August 1992	Writs were issued by the Governor to proceed with an election.
29 August 1992	Close of electoral rolls.
1 September 1992	Close of nominations.
19 September 1992	Polling day, between the hours of 8am and 6pm.
24 September 1992	The Goss Ministry was reconstituted.
31 October 1992	The writ was returned and the results formally declared.

== Electoral redistribution ==
A redistribution of electoral boundaries occurred in 1991. The zonal system was abolished, with a weighting added for remote electorates over 100,000km2.

The electorates of Auburn, Balonne, Bowen, Broadsound, Carnarvon, Condamine, Cooroora, Fassifern, Flinders, Glass House, Isis, Landsborough, Manly, Merthyr, Mourilyan, Nundah, Peak Downs, Pine Rivers, Port Curtis, Rockhampton North, Roma, Salisbury, Sherwood, Somerset, South Coast, Stafford, Toowong, Townsville East, Windsor, and Wolston were abolished.

The electorates of Beaudesert, Broadwater, Bundamba, Burleigh, Caloundra, Capalaba, Charters Towers, Chermside, Clayfield, Cleveland, Crows Nest, Ferny Grove, Fitzroy, Gladstone, Hervey Bay, Inala, Indooroopilly, Kallangur, Kedron, Keppel, Kurwongbah, Maroochydore, Merrimac, Mooloolah, Mount Ommaney, Mundingburra, Noosa, Sunnybank, Waterford, and Western Downs were created.

The redistribution added 7 more electorates to Greater Brisbane, the Gold Coast, and Sunshine Coast, while leaving 7 less electorates in regional Queensland. Aspley, Clayfield, and Hinchinbrook became notionally Labor-held.

The changes resulted in 59 notionally Labor-held seats, 10 notionally Liberal-held seats, and 20 notionally National-held seats.

== Retiring members ==
=== Labor ===
- Ron McLean (Bulimba)
- Bill Prest (Port Curtis)
- Nev Warburton (Sandgate)

=== National ===
- Des Booth (Warwick) – Lost preselection
- Bill Gunn (Somerset)
- Neville Harper (Auburn) – Lost preselection
- Bob Katter (Flinders)
- Don Neal (Balonne)

== Results ==
Queensland state election, 19 September 1992 Legislative Assembly << 1989–1995 >>
Enrolled voters	1,951,675				
Votes cast	1,785,403		Turnout	91.48%	+0.30%
Informal votes	40,242		Informal	2.25%	–0.75%
Summary of votes by party
Party	Primary votes	%	Swing	Seats	Change
Labor	850,480	48.73%	–1.59%	54	±0
Nationals	413,772	23.71%	–0.38%	26	–1
Liberal	356,640	20.44%	–0.62%	9	+1
Confederate Action	23,510	1.35%	+1.35%	0	±0
Greens	11,463	0.66%	+0.33%	0	±0
Indigenous Peoples	6,431	0.37%	+0.37%	0	±0
Democrats	5,774	0.33%	–0.09%	0	±0
Independent	77,091	4.42%	+1.20%	0	±0
Total	1,745,161			89	
Two-party-preferred
Labor		53.7%	-0.1%		
National/Liberal		46.3%	+0.1%		

Popular vote
Labor	48.73%
Nationals	23.71%
Liberal	20.44%
Confederate Action	1.35%
Greens	0.66%
Indigenous Peoples	0.37%
Democrats	0.33%
Independents	4.42%

Seats
Labor	60.67%
Nationals	29.21%
Liberal	10.11%

== Seats changing hands ==
Seat	1991 Redistribution			Swing	1992 Election		
Seat	Party	Member	Margin	Swing	Margin	Member	Party
Aspley	Labor	notional	1.10	–2.03	0.93	John Goss	Liberal
Broadwater	Liberal	notional	4.80	–11.72	6.92	Allan Grice	National
Burleigh	Liberal	notional	3.60	–4.68	1.08	Judy Gamin	National
Caloundra	National	notional¹	6.20	–8.52	2.32	Joan Sheldon	Liberal
Charters Towers	Labor	Ken Smyth	1.60	–1.96	0.36	Rob Mitchell	National
Clayfield	Labor	notional	0.00	–4.08	4.08	Santo Santoro	Liberal
Currumbin	Liberal	Trevor Coomber	0.10	–5.91	5.81	Merri Rose	Labor
Hinchinbrook	Labor	Bill Eaton	3.00	–5.26	2.26	Marc Rowell	National
Keppel	Labor	Robert Schwarten	3.30	–4.71	1.41	Vince Lester	National
Maroochydore	Liberal	notional	4.10	–8.12	4.02	Fiona Simpson	National
Mooloolah	National	notional	6.50	–19.38	12.88	Bruce Laming	Liberal
Mount Ommaney	Liberal	David Dunworth	3.70	–4.95	1.25	Peter Pyke	Labor
Nicklin	Liberal	notional²	4.00	–11.88	7.88	Neil Turner	National
Noosa	Labor	Ray Barber	2.40	–4.86	2.46	Bruce Davidson	Liberal
Toowoomba North	Labor	John Flynn	0.10	–0.60	0.50	Graham Healy	National

- Members listed in italics did not contest their seat at this election.
- ¹ Joan Sheldon gained Landsborough for the Liberal Party at the 1990 by-election. The National Party had retained the seat at the 1989 election.
- ² In 1990, the Court of Disputed Returns overturned the result and declared Neil Turner for the National Party elected in Nicklin. The Liberal Party had originally been declared the winner at the 1989 election.

== Post-election pendulum ==
Labor seats (54)
Marginal
Hervey Bay	Bill Nunn	ALP	0.61%
Mount Ommaney	Peter Pyke	ALP	1.25%
Albert	John Szczerbanik	ALP	1.64%
Gladstone	Neil Bennett	ALP	1.99% v IND
Whitsunday	Lorraine Bird	ALP	2.20%
Mansfield	Laurel Power	ALP	2.56%
Mulgrave	Warren Pitt	ALP	3.17%
Maryborough	Bob Dollin	ALP	3.30%
Barron River	Lesley Clark	ALP	4.16%
Redlands	John Budd	ALP	5.25%
Sunnybank	Stephen Robertson	ALP	5.53%
Currumbin	Merri Rose	ALP	5.81%
Fairly Safe
Thuringowa	Ken McElligott	ALP	7.13%
Greenslopes	Gary Fenlon	ALP	7.24%
Cleveland	Darryl Briskey	ALP	7.47%
Caboolture	Jon Sullivan	ALP	7.90%
Redcliffe	Ray Hollis	ALP	8.55%
Bundaberg	Clem Campbell	ALP	8.65%
Springwood	Molly Robson	ALP	8.66%
Mount Gravatt	Judy Spence	ALP	9.17%
Ashgrove	Jim Fouras	ALP	9.28%
Mundingburra	Ken Davies	ALP	9.40%
Safe
Waterford	Tom Barton	ALP	10.82%
Cairns	Keith De Lacy	ALP	11.14%
Chatsworth	Terry Mackenroth	ALP	11.14%
Townsville	Geoff Smith	ALP	11.17%
Everton	Rod Welford	ALP	11.67%
Chermside	Terry Sullivan	ALP	11.70%
Fitzroy	Jim Pearce	ALP	12.00%
Kallangur	Ken Hayward	ALP	12.11%
Cook	Steve Bredhauer	ALP	12.18%
Mount Coot-tha	Wendy Edmond	ALP	12.38%
Ipswich West	Don Livingstone	ALP	12.66%
Kurwongbah	Margaret Woodgate	ALP	13.06%
Rockhampton	Paul Braddy	ALP	13.08%
Yeronga	Matt Foley	ALP	13.47%
Ferny Grove	Glen Milliner	ALP	13.84%
Mackay	Ed Casey	ALP	14.20%
Capalaba	Jim Elder	ALP	14.67%
Brisbane Central	Peter Beattie	ALP	14.83%
Archerfield	Len Ardill	ALP	15.19%
Kedron	Pat Comben	ALP	16.25%
Murrumba	Dean Wells	ALP	16.29%
Sandgate	Gordon Nuttall	ALP	16.43%
Mount Isa	Tony McGrady	ALP	17.59%
Ipswich	David Hamill	ALP	17.78%
South Brisbane	Anne Warner	ALP	18.49%
Nudgee	Ken Vaughan	ALP	18.71%
Bundamba	Bob Gibbs	ALP	19.80% v IND
Lytton	Tom Burns	ALP	19.84%
Very Safe
Bulimba	Pat Purcell	ALP	20.44%
Woodridge	Bill D'Arcy	ALP	25.17%
Logan	Wayne Goss	ALP	25.34%
Inala	Henry Palaszczuk	ALP	26.43%

National seats (26)
Marginal
Charters Towers	Rob Mitchell	NAT	0.36%
Toowoomba North	Graham Healy	NAT	0.50%
Burleigh	Judy Gamin	NAT	1.08%
Keppel	Vince Lester	NAT	1.41%
Burdekin	Mark Stoneman	NAT	2.05%
Hinchinbrook	Marc Rowell	NAT	2.26%
Southport	Mick Veivers	NAT	2.33%
Surfers Paradise	Rob Borbidge	NAT	2.93% v LIB
Beaudesert	Kev Lingard	NAT	3.22%
Maroochydore	Fiona Simpson	NAT	4.02%
Mirani	Jim Randell	NAT	4.33%
Fairly Safe
Broadwater	Allan Grice	NAT	6.92%
Gympie	Len Stephan	NAT	7.63%
Nicklin	Neil Turner	NAT	7.88%
Burnett	Doug Slack	NAT	9.49%
Safe
Gregory	Vaughan Johnson	NAT	10.23%
Toowoomba South	Mike Horan	NAT	11.18%
Warwick	Lawrence Springborg	NAT	11.43%
Warrego	Howard Hobbs	NAT	13.57%
Tablelands	Tom Gilmore	NAT	14.36%
Lockyer	Tony Fitzgerald	NAT	15.09%
Cunningham	Tony Elliott	NAT	16.37%
Crows Nest	Russell Cooper	NAT	18.58%
Barambah	Trevor Perrett	NAT	19.38%
Very Safe
Callide	Di McCauley	NAT	25.92% v IND
Western Downs	Brian Littleproud	NAT	26.61%
Liberal seats (9)
Marginal
Aspley	John Goss	LIB	0.93%
Caloundra	Joan Sheldon	LIB	2.32%
Noosa	Bruce Davidson	LIB	2.46%
Clayfield	Santo Santoro	LIB	4.08%
Nerang	Ray Connor	LIB	4.84%
Fairly Safe
Indooroopilly	Denver Beanland	LIB	6.38%
Moggill	David Watson	LIB	9.08%
Safe
Merrimac	Bob Quinn	LIB	10.54%
Mooloolah	Bruce Laming	LIB	12.88%

== Subsequent changes ==
- On 31 March 1994, National Party member Jim Randell (Mirani) resigned. At the by-election on 30 April 1994, Ted Malone retained the seat for the National Party.

== See also ==
- Members of the Queensland Legislative Assembly, 1989–1992
- Members of the Queensland Legislative Assembly, 1992–1995
- Candidates of the Queensland state election, 1992
- Goss Ministry
