= Members of the Queensland Legislative Assembly, 1989–1992 =

This is a list of members of the 46th Legislative Assembly of Queensland from 1989 to 1992, as elected at the 1989 state election held on 2 December 1989.

Name	Party	Electorate	Term in office
Hon Mike Ahern ^{[1]}	National	Landsborough	1968–1990
Len Ardill	Labor	Salisbury	1986–1998
Ray Barber	Labor	Cooroora	1989–1992
Denver Beanland	Liberal	Toowong	1986–2001
Peter Beattie	Labor	Brisbane Central	1989–2007
Clive Berghofer ^{[5]}	National	Toowoomba South	1986–1991
Lorraine Bird	Labor	Whitsunday	1989–1998
Des Booth	National	Warwick	1977–1992
Rob Borbidge	National	Surfers Paradise	1980–2001
Hon Paul Braddy	Labor	Rockhampton	1985–2001
Steve Bredhauer	Labor	Cook	1989–2004
Darryl Briskey	Labor	Redlands	1989–2006
Hon Tom Burns	Labor	Lytton	1972–1996
Clem Campbell	Labor	Bundaberg	1983–1998
Hon Ed Casey	Labor	Mackay	1969–1995
Dr Lesley Clark	Labor	Barron River	1989–1995, 1998–2006
Hon Pat Comben	Labor	Windsor	1983–1995
Ray Connor	Liberal	Nerang	1989–2001
Trevor Coomber	Liberal	Currumbin	1989–1992
Hon Russell Cooper	National	Roma	1983–2001
Bill D'Arcy	Labor	Woodridge	1972–1974, 1977–2000
Ken Davies	Labor	Townsville	1989–1995
Hon Keith De Lacy	Labor	Cairns	1983–1998
Bob Dollin	Labor	Maryborough	1989–1998
David Dunworth ^{[2]}	Liberal	Sherwood	1990–1992
Hon Bill Eaton	Labor	Mourilyan	1980–1992
Wendy Edmond	Labor	Mount Coot-tha	1989–2004
Jim Elder	Labor	Manly	1989–2001
Tony Elliott	National	Cunningham	1974–2001
Gary Fenlon	Labor	Greenslopes	1989–1995, 1998–2009
Tony Fitzgerald	National	Lockyer	1980–1998
Dr John Flynn	Labor	Toowoomba North	1989–1992
Matt Foley	Labor	Yeronga	1989–2004
Hon Jim Fouras	Labor	Ashgrove	1977–1986, 1989–2006
Hon Bob Gibbs	Labor	Wolston	1977–1999
Tom Gilmore	National	Tablelands	1986–1998
John Goss	Liberal	Aspley	1989–2001
Hon Wayne Goss	Labor	Logan	1983–1998
Hon Bill Gunn	National	Somerset	1972–1992
Hon David Hamill	Labor	Ipswich	1983–2001
Hon Neville Harper	National	Auburn	1980–1992
Hon Ken Hayward	Labor	Caboolture	1986–2009
Phil Heath ^{[4]}	Labor	Nundah	1989–1991
Howard Hobbs	National	Warrego	1986–2015
Ray Hollis	Labor	Redcliffe	1989–2005
Mike Horan ^{[5]}	National	Toowoomba South	1991–2012
Angus Innes ^{[2]}	Liberal	Sherwood	1978–1990
Vaughan Johnson	National	Gregory	1989–2015
Bob Katter	National	Flinders	1974–1992
Bob King ^{[3]}	Liberal	Nicklin	1989–1990
Hon Vince Lester	National	Peak Downs	1974–2004
Kev Lingard	National	Fassifern	1983–2009
Brian Littleproud	National	Condamine	1983–2001
Don Livingstone	Labor	Ipswich West	1989–1998, 2001–2006
Hon Terry Mackenroth	Labor	Chatsworth	1977–2005
Di McCauley	National	Callide	1986–1998
Hon Ken McElligott	Labor	Thuringowa	1983–1998
Hon Tony McGrady	Labor	Mount Isa	1989–2006
Hon Ron McLean	Labor	Bulimba	1980–1992
Hon Glen Milliner	Labor	Everton	1977–1998
Hon Don Neal	National	Balonne	1972–1992
Bill Nunn	Labor	Isis	1989–1998
Henry Palaszczuk	Labor	Archerfield	1984–2006
Jim Pearce	Labor	Broadsound	1989–2009, 2015–2017
Trevor Perrett	National	Barambah	1988–1998
Warren Pitt	Labor	Mulgrave	1989–1995, 1998–2009
Laurel Power	Labor	Mansfield	1989–1995
Bill Prest	Labor	Port Curtis	1976–1992
Bob Quinn	Liberal	South Coast	1989–2006
Jim Randell	National	Mirani	1980–1994
Molly Robson	Labor	Springwood	1989–1995
Marc Rowell	National	Hinchinbrook	1989–2006
Santo Santoro	Liberal	Merthyr	1989–2001
Robert Schwarten	Labor	Rockhampton North	1989–1992, 1995–2012
Joan Sheldon ^{[1]}	Liberal	Landsborough	1990–2004
Doug Slack	National	Burnett	1986–2001
Hon Geoff Smith	Labor	Townsville East	1980–1998
Ken Smyth	Labor	Bowen	1986–1992
Judy Spence	Labor	Mount Gravatt	1989–2012
Lawrence Springborg	National	Carnarvon	1989–2017
Len Stephan	National	Gympie	1979–2001
Mark Stoneman	National	Burdekin	1983–1998
Jon Sullivan	Labor	Glass House	1989–1998
Terry Sullivan ^{[4]}	Labor	Nundah	1991–2006
John Szczerbanik	Labor	Albert	1989–1995
Hon Neil Turner ^{[3]}	National	Nicklin	1974–1986, 1991–1998
Hon Ken Vaughan	Labor	Nudgee	1977–1995
Mick Veivers	National	Southport	1987–2001
Hon Nev Warburton	Labor	Sandgate	1977–1992
Hon Anne Warner	Labor	South Brisbane	1983–1995
Dr David Watson	Liberal	Moggill	1989–2004
Rod Welford	Labor	Stafford	1989–2009
Hon Dean Wells	Labor	Murrumba	1986–2012
Margaret Woodgate	Labor	Pine Rivers	1989–1997

^{1} On 6 May 1990, the National member for Landsborough and former Premier of Queensland, Mike Ahern, resigned. Liberal candidate Joan Sheldon won the resulting by-election on 28 July 1990.
^{2} On 13 May 1990, the Liberal member for Sherwood, Angus Innes, resigned. Liberal candidate David Dunworth won the resulting by-election on 28 July 1990.
^{3} Liberal candidate Bob King was initially declared elected as the Liberal member for Nicklin, but the result was overturned by the Court of Disputed Returns on 21 November 1990. The court declared National candidate Neil Turner elected rather than ordering a by-election for the seat.
^{4} On 5 April 1991, the Labor member for Nundah, Phil Heath, resigned. Labor candidate Terry Sullivan won the resulting by-election on 18 May 1991.
^{5} On 23 March 1991, the National member for Toowoomba South, Clive Berghofer, vacated his seat. National Party candidate Mike Horan won the resulting by-election on 18 May 1991.

== See also ==
- 1989 Queensland state election
- Premier: Wayne Goss (Labor) (1989–1996)
