= Electoral results for the district of Broadsound =

Queensland, Australia, district election results

This is a list of electoral results for the electoral district of Broadsound in Queensland state elections.

== Members for Broadsound ==
| Member | Party | Term |
|---|---|---|
| Denis Hinton | National | 1986–1989 |
| Jim Pearce | Labor | 1989–1992 |

== Election results ==
=== Elections in the 1980s ===
1989 Queensland state election: Broadsound
| Party | Candidate | Votes | % | ±% |
|---|---|---|---|---|
| Labor | Jim Pearce | 6,170 | 45.3 | +7.9 |
| National | Denis Hinton | 5,434 | 39.9 | −2.3 |
| Independent | James O'Brien | 1,038 | 7.6 | +7.6 |
| Liberal | Howard Rodda | 634 | 4.6 | +4.6 |
| Citizens Electoral Council | Leslie White | 354 | 2.6 | +2.6 |
| Total formal votes | | 13,630 | 97.2 | −0.8 |
| Informal votes | | 397 | 2.8 | +0.8 |
| Turnout | | 14,027 | 92.2 | +0.7 |
Two-party-preferred result
| Labor | Jim Pearce | 7,189 | 52.7 | +4.7 |
| National | Denis Hinton | 6,441 | 47.3 | −4.7 |
| Labor gain from National | | Swing | +4.7 | |

1986 Queensland state election: Broadsound
| Party | Candidate | Votes | % | ±% |
|---|---|---|---|---|
| National | Denis Hinton | 4,991 | 42.2 | |
| Labor | Chris Palmer | 4,419 | 37.4 | |
| Independent | Barbara Wildin | 1,727 | 14.6 | |
| Independent | Ros Scott | 683 | 5.8 | |
| Total formal votes | | 11,820 | 98.0 | |
| Informal votes | | 242 | 2.0 | |
| Turnout | | 12,062 | 91.5 | |
Two-party-preferred result
| National | Denis Hinton | 6,142 | 52.0 | −7.3 |
| Labor | Chris Palmer | 5,678 | 48.0 | +7.3 |
| National hold | | Swing | −7.3 | |
