= Electoral results for the district of Manly (Queensland) =

Election results for Manly, Queensland for the Australian House of Representatives

This is a list of electoral results for the electoral district of Manly in Queensland state elections.

== Members for Manly ==
Member	Party	Term
Eric Shaw	Labor Party	1986–1988
Eric Shaw	Independent	1988–1989
Jim Elder	Labor Party	1989–1992

== Election results ==
=== Elections in the 1980s ===
1989 Queensland state election: Manly
Party	Candidate	Votes	%	±%
Labor	Jim Elder	14,174	57.3	+6.3
Liberal	Verlie Farrell	4,189	16.9	+3.7
National	Paul Asher	3,709	15.0	−13.4
Democrats	Robert George	2,392	9.7	+9.7
Advance Australia	Barry Cullen	265	1.1	+1.1
Total formal votes		24,729	96.7	−1.4
Informal votes		849	3.3	+1.4
Turnout		25,578	92.4	−0.3
Two-party-preferred result
Labor	Jim Elder	15,827	64.0	+7.3
Liberal	Verlie Farrell	8,902	36.0	+36.0
Labor hold		Swing	+7.3	

1986 Queensland state election: Manly
Party	Candidate	Votes	%	±%
Labor	Eric Shaw	10,647	51.0	
National	Merv Hoppner	5,928	28.4	
Liberal	Des Morris	4,309	20.6	
Total formal votes		20,884	98.1	
Informal votes		412	1.9	
Turnout		21,296	92.7	
Two-party-preferred result
Labor	Eric Shaw	11,841	56.7	+4.2
National	Merv Hoppner	9,043	43.3	−4.2
Labor hold		Swing	+4.2	
