= Ian Walker (politician) =

Australian politician

The Honourable Ian Walker

Shadow Minister for Planning
- In office 6 May 2016 – 15 December 2017
- Leader: Tim Nicholls
- Preceded by: Tim Nicholls
- Succeeded by: Andrew Powell

Shadow Attorney-General Shadow Minister for Justice
- In office 14 February 2015 – 15 December 2017
- Leader: Lawrence Springborg; Tim Nicholls
- Preceded by: Yvette D'Ath
- Succeeded by: David Janetzki

Shadow Minister for Industrial Relations and Arts
- In office 14 February 2015 – 6 May 2016
- Leader: Lawrence Springborg
- Preceded by: Annastacia Palaszczuk (Industrial Relations); Jackie Trad (Arts)
- Succeeded by: Jarrod Bleijie (Industrial Relations); Tim Nicholls (Arts)

Minister for Science, Information Technology, Innovation and the Arts
- In office 17 February 2013 – 14 February 2015
- Premier: Campbell Newman
- Preceded by: Ros Bates
- Succeeded by: Leeanne Enoch (Science and Innovation) Annastacia Palaszczuk (Arts)

Member of the Queensland Parliament for Mansfield
- In office 24 March 2012 – 25 November 2017
- Preceded by: Phil Reeves
- Succeeded by: Corrine McMillan

Personal details
- Born: 18 November 1954 (age 71) Sydney, New South Wales, Australia
- Party: Liberal National
- Profession: Solicitor

Ian Bradley Walker (born 18 November 1954) is an Australian politician. He was a Liberal National member of the Queensland Legislative Assembly from 2012 to 2017, representing the electorate of Mansfield. He was Minister for Science, Information Technology, Innovation and the Arts from 2013 to 2015 under Campbell Newman.

Following the LNP's electoral victory in 2012, Walker was appointed Assistant Minister for Planning Reform on 3 April 2012. On 17 February 2013, then Premier Campbell Newman appointed Walker as the new Minister for Science, Information Technology, Innovation and the Arts after the resignation of Ros Bates.

Following the LNP's defeat at the 2015 Queensland election, Walker was succeeded as Minister by Leeanne Enoch (Science and Innovation) and Premier Annastacia Palaszczuk (Arts).

Despite the statewide defeat of the LNP, Walker narrowly retained Mansfield, a noted bellwether seat, becoming its second opposition member. The first, fellow Liberal Frank Carroll, served in opposition for a few months in 1995 and 1996 before a by-election elevated the Coalition to minority government.

The Opposition Leader Lawrence Springborg appointed Walker to the Shadow Cabinet, giving him the roles of Shadow Attorney-General and Shadow Minister for Justice, Shadow Minister for Industrial Relations and Shadow Minister for the Arts.

Walker's seat of Mansfield was altered by an electoral redistribution for the 2017 election, becoming a notionally Labor seat with a 0.8% Labor margin, as opposed to Walker's 0.5% margin from the 2015 election. He recontested his seat on the new boundaries, but was defeated by Labor candidate Corrine McMillan.

Walker was educated at the Anglican Church Grammar School.

Parliament of Queensland
Preceded by Phil Reeves	Member for Mansfield; 2012–2017	Succeeded by Corrine McMillan
