= Corrine McMillan =

Australian politician

Corrine McMillan MP

Member of the Queensland Legislative Assembly for Mansfield
- Incumbent
- Assumed office 25 November 2017
- Preceded by: Ian Walker

Personal details
- Born: 12 August 1973 (age 52) Ipswich, Queensland, Australia
- Party: Labor
- Website: www.corrinemcmillan.com.au

Corrine Patricia McMillan (born 12 August 1973) is an Australian politician. She has been the Labor member for Mansfield in the Queensland Legislative Assembly since 2017.

Parliament of Queensland
Preceded by Ian Walker	Member for Mansfield; 2017–present	Incumbent
