= Phil Reeves (politician) =

Australian politician (born 1966)

The Hon Phil Reeves

Minister for Child Safety
- In office 26 March 2009 – 26 March 2012
- Premier: Anna Bligh
- Preceded by: Margaret Keech
- Succeeded by: Tracy Davis

Minister for Sport of Queensland
- In office 26 March 2009 – 26 March 2012
- Premier: Anna Bligh
- Preceded by: Judy Spence
- Succeeded by: Steve Dickson

Member of the Queensland Legislative Assembly for Mansfield
- In office 13 June 1998 – 24 March 2012
- Preceded by: Frank Carroll
- Succeeded by: Ian Walker

Personal details
- Born: Philip Gerard Reeves; 19 September 1966 (age 60) Brisbane, Queensland, Australia
- Party: Labor
- Spouse: Megan
- Children: 3
- Education: Griffith University
- Occupation: Sports marketing

Philip Gerard Reeves (born 19 September 1966) is an Australian politician.

== Early life and career ==
Born in Brisbane, he received a Bachelor of Arts in Leisure Management from Griffith University and was a sports management and marketing consultant. He joined the Labor Party in 1987 and was vice-president of the Garden City Branch.

== Member of parliament ==
In 1998, he was elected to the Legislative Assembly of Queensland as the member for Mansfield, defeating sitting Liberal MP Frank Carroll. Reeves represented Mansfield until the 2012 election, and was Minister for Child Safety and Minister for Sport from 26 March 2009.

== Personal life ==
Phil Reeves is married to Megan and has three children, Brianna, Ashleigh and Jemma.

Parliament of Queensland
Preceded by Frank Carroll	Member for Mansfield; 1998–2012	Succeeded by Ian Walker
