= Frank Carroll (Queensland politician) =

Australian politician

Member of the Queensland Legislative Assembly for Mansfield
- In office 15 July 1995 – 13 June 1998
- Preceded by: Laurel Power
- Succeeded by: Phil Reeves

Personal details
- Born: Francis Edward Carroll; 8 April 1952 (age 74) Brisbane, Queensland, Australia
- Party: Liberal Party
- Education: University of Queensland
- Occupation: Solicitor

Francis Edward "Frank" Carroll (born 8 April 1952) is a former Australian politician.

He was born in Brisbane and qualified with a Bachelor of Commerce and Bachelor of Law from the University of Queensland. He was admitted as a solicitor to the Supreme Court of Queensland and the High Court of Australia in 1976. In 1995 he was elected to the Queensland Legislative Assembly as the Liberal member for Mansfield. He was made Deputy Opposition Whip and Liberal Party Whip shortly after his election, becoming Deputy Government Whip when the Borbidge government took office in 1996. Carroll was defeated at the 1998 state election.

Parliament of Queensland
Preceded by Laurel Power	Member for Mansfield; 1995–1998	Succeeded by Phil Reeves
