= Terry Sullivan (Australian politician) =

Australian politician

Queensland Government Chief Whip
- In office 30 July 1998 – 9 September 2006
- Premier: Peter Beattie
- Preceded by: Rob Mitchell
- Succeeded by: Carolyn Male

Member of the Queensland Legislative Assembly for Stafford Chermside (1992–2001) Nundah (1991–1992)
- In office 18 May 1991 – 9 September 2006
- Preceded by: Phil Heath
- Succeeded by: Stirling Hinchliffe

Personal details
- Born: Terence Boland Sullivan; 6 February 1949 (age 77) Brisbane, Queensland, Australia
- Party: Labor
- Children: Jimmy Sullivan
- Occupation: School Teacher

Terence Boland Sullivan (born 6 February 1949) is a former Australian politician. He was born in Brisbane. Before entering politics, he was a school teacher and a member of the Queensland Association of Teachers and Independent Schools. In 1981, he joined the Labor Party. He was elected to the Legislative Assembly of Queensland in 1991 as the member for Nundah, moving to Chermside in 1992 and Stafford in 2001. When Labor won the 1998 state election, Sullivan was appointed Government Whip, a position he held until his retirement from politics in 2006.

Parliament of Queensland
Preceded by Phil Heath	Member for Nundah; 1991–1992	Abolished
New seat	Member for Chermside; 1992–2001	Abolished
New seat	Member for Stafford; 2001–2006	Succeeded by Stirling Hinchliffe
