= Denis Hinton =

Australian politician

Member of the Queensland Legislative Assembly for Broadsound
- In office 1 November 1986 – 2 December 1989
- Preceded by: New seat
- Succeeded by: Jim Pearce

Personal details
- Born: Denis Grenville Hinton; 4 December 1939 (age 86) Perth, Western Australia, Australia
- Party: National Party
- Spouse: Roslyn Susanna Ellerton (m.1967)
- Occupation: Pig farmer

Denis Grenville Hinton (born 4 December 1939) is a former Australian politician.

He was born in Perth to Howard Hinton and Muriel Rose, née Abbot. He was educated at Northcote High School in Melbourne and then Dookie Agricultural College, where he received a Diploma of Agriculture. He became a pig farmer in Queensland and joined the National Party, serving as a Banana Shire Councillor from 1967 to 1970. In 1986 he was elected to the Queensland Legislative Assembly as the member for Broadsound, but he was defeated in 1989.

Parliament of Queensland
New seat	Member for Broadsound; 1986–1989	Succeeded by Jim Pearce
