= Electoral district of Broadsound =

Broadsound Queensland—Legislative Assembly
- State: Queensland
- Dates current: 1986–1992
- Namesake: Shire of Broadsound

Broadsound was an electoral district of the Legislative Assembly in the Australian state of Queensland from 1986 to 1992.

Based in Central Queensland, Broadsound was created for the 1986 state election from parts of the districts of Callide and Mirani. The district's first member was Denis Hinton of the National Party. Hinton was defeated at the 1989 state election by Jim Pearce of the Labor Party as part of the statewide momentum that brought Labor into government under the leadership of Wayne Goss. The district was abolished ahead of the 1992 state election, with its former territory added to the district of Mirani and the new districts of Fitzroy and Keppel. Pearce transferred to the seat of Fitzroy.

== Members for Broadsound ==
Member	Party	Term
Denis Hinton	National	1986–1989
Jim Pearce	Labor	1989–1992

== See also ==
- Electoral districts of Queensland
- Members of the Queensland Legislative Assembly by year
- Category:Members of the Queensland Legislative Assembly by name
