= Phil Heath (politician) =

Australian politician

Phil Heath JP

Member of the Queensland Legislative Assembly for Nundah
- In office 2 December 1989 – 5 April 1991
- Preceded by: William Knox
- Succeeded by: Terry Sullivan

Personal details
- Born: Philip Arthur Heath; 24 September 1954 (age 71) Brisbane, Queensland, Australia
- Party: Labor
- Occupation: Manager

Philip Arthur Heath (born 24 September 1954) is a former Australian politician. He was a Member of the Queensland Legislative Assembly.

== Early life ==
He was born in Brisbane to Henry J. G. Heath OAM, a naval officer, and Daphne Beryl, née Landry. After attending primary school at Bulimba and then Brisbane Grammar School, he became a salesman and departmental manager of a boat and motorcycle dealership from 1972. From 1984 he owned boating and waterski retail and wholesale businesses and was a member of various local community groups.

== Politics ==
Heath was a member of the Labor Party, serving on the State Council, and the Consumer Affairs, Law, and Administration Policy Committees. He was also vice-president of the Lilley Division Executive and secretary of the Kalinga/Wooloowin branch. In 1989 he was elected to the Queensland Legislative Assembly as the member for Nundah, but he resigned in 1991 over political disappointments and personal problems.

== Later life ==
Returning to the Harley-Davidson motorcycle dealership, he became Manager covering Rider Equipment, Clothing, Parts and Accessories, and other business-facets for all Harley-Davidson Dealerships in Queensland, New Zealand, and New Caledonia. In 2012 he retired to become a part-time consultant and columnist for magazines.

While retaining a role as a magazine contributor, he later re-started Harley-Davidson dealership work in New Zealand where he currently resides. From late 2019, he has retired from full-time work, and is again a part-time consultant for the Harley-Davidson industry, and writes regularly for motorcycle magazines.

Parliament of Queensland
Preceded by William Knox	Member for Nundah; 1989–1991	Succeeded by Terry Sullivan
