= Craig Sherrin =

Australian politician

Member of the Queensland Legislative Assembly for Mansfield
- In office 1 November 1986 – 2 December 1989
- Preceded by: Bill Kaus
- Succeeded by: Laurel Power

Personal details
- Born: Craig Arden Sherrin; 16 February 1952 (age 74) Maryborough, Queensland, Australia
- Party: National Party
- Spouse: Lyndelle Anne Rawlings (m.1975)
- Education: University of Queensland
- Occupation: Public servant, Teacher

Craig Arden Sherrin (born 16 February 1952) is a former Australian politician.

He was born in Maryborough to Arden Charles Sherrin and Beryl Joan, née Shaw. He attended various state schools and then Coorparoo State High School before attending the University of Queensland (Bachelor of Science, Diploma of Education, Bachelor and Master of Educational Studies, Master of Public Administration). He became a science teacher in 1976, and in 1983 was appointed a special duties officer with the Queensland Department of Education, winning a promotion to assistant director of technology services in 1986. A member of the National Party, he was elected to the Queensland Legislative Assembly in 1986 as the member for Mansfield. In January 1989 he was appointed to the front bench as Minister for Family Services, but he ceased to hold the position in September. He lost his seat at the election in December 1989.

Parliament of Queensland
Preceded by Bill Kaus	Member for Mansfield; 1986–1989	Succeeded by Laurel Power
