= Ken Smyth =

Australian politician

Member of the Queensland Legislative Assembly for Bowen
- In office 1 November 1986 – 19 September 1992
- Preceded by: New seat
- Succeeded by: Seat abolished

Personal details
- Born: Kenneth William Smyth; 4 October 1948 (age 77) Rockhampton, Queensland, Australia
- Party: Labor
- Spouse: Tru-Dell Martin (m.1968, separated 1990)
- Occupation: Carpenter, Coal mining industry

Kenneth William Smyth (born 4 October 1948) is a former Australian politician.

He was born in Rockhampton to Frederick Tomas Smyth and Annie Maud, née Gray; his parents separated two years after his birth. He attended both state and Catholic schools in Mackay before becoming a carpenter and then a miner with the Utah Company's Peak Downs coalmine. A member of the Labor Party, he was a Belyando Shire Councillor from 1982 to 1991 and in 1986 was elected as the member for Bowen in the Queensland Legislative Assembly. In 1992 his seat was abolished and he ran unsuccessfully for Charters Towers.

Parliament of Queensland
| New seat | Member for Bowen; 1986–1992 | Abolished |
