= Electoral district of Manly (Queensland) =

Former state electoral district of Queensland, Australia

Manly Queensland—Legislative Assembly
- State: Queensland
- Created: 1986
- Abolished: 1992
- Namesake: Manly

Manly was an electoral district of the Legislative Assembly in the Australian state of Queensland from 1986 to 1992.

The district was based in the eastern suburbs of Brisbane and named for the suburb of Manly.

== Members for Manly ==
Member	Party	Term
Eric Shaw	Labor Party	1986–1988
Eric Shaw	Independent	1988–1989
Jim Elder	Labor Party	1989–1992

== See also ==
- Electoral districts of Queensland
- Members of the Queensland Legislative Assembly by year
- Category:Members of the Queensland Legislative Assembly by name
