= Laurel Power =

Australian politician

Member of the Queensland Legislative Assembly for Mansfield
- In office 2 December 1989 – 15 July 1995
- Preceded by: Craig Sherrin
- Succeeded by: Frank Carroll

Personal details
- Born: 7 December 1953 (age 72) Augathella, Queensland, Australia
- Party: Labor
- Occupation: School teacher

Laurel Jean Power (born 7 December 1953) is a former Australian politician.

She was born at Augathella and worked as a teacher before entering politics. A member of the Labor Party, she was elected to the Queensland Legislative Assembly as the member for Mansfield in 1989. She served as temporary chairman of committees from 1992 to 1995, when she was defeated by a Liberal candidate.

Parliament of Queensland
Preceded by Craig Sherrin	Member for Mansfield; 1989–1995	Succeeded by Frank Carroll
