= Jim Elder (politician) =

Australian politician

The Hon Jim Elder

27th Deputy Premier of Queensland
- In office 26 June 1998 – 22 November 2000
- Premier: Peter Beattie
- Preceded by: Joan Sheldon
- Succeeded by: Paul Braddy

Minister for State Development and Trade
- In office 26 June 1998 – 22 November 2000
- Premier: Peter Beattie
- Preceded by: Doug Slack
- Succeeded by: Peter Beattie

Deputy Leader of the Labor Party in Queensland
- In office 19 February 1996 – 22 November 2000
- Leader: Peter Beattie
- Preceded by: Tom Burns
- Succeeded by: Terry Mackenroth

Deputy Leader of the Opposition in Queensland
- In office 19 February 1996 – 26 June 1998
- Leader: Peter Beattie
- Preceded by: Joan Sheldon
- Succeeded by: David Watson

Minister for Transport
- In office 31 July 1995 – 19 February 1996
- Premier: Wayne Goss
- Preceded by: Ken Hayward
- Succeeded by: Vaughan Johnson

Minister for Health
- In office 21 February 1995 – 31 July 1995
- Premier: Wayne Goss
- Preceded by: Ken Hayward
- Succeeded by: Peter Beattie

Minister for Business, Industry and Regional Development
- In office 24 September 1992 – 21 February 1995
- Premier: Wayne Goss
- Preceded by: Geoff Smith
- Succeeded by: Warren Pitt

Member of the Queensland Legislative Assembly for Capalaba Manly (1989–1992)
- In office 2 December 1989 – 17 February 2001
- Preceded by: Eric Shaw
- Succeeded by: Michael Choi

Personal details
- Born: James Peter Elder; 14 December 1950 (age 75) Melbourne, Australia
- Party: Labor
- Other party: Independent
- Children: 3
- Occupation: Company Manager

James Peter Elder (born 14 December 1950) is a former Australian politician. He was a member of the Legislative Assembly of Queensland from 1989 to 2001, representing Manly until 1992 and Capalaba thereafter. Originally elected as a Labor member and serving as Deputy Premier in the Beattie Government, Elder resigned from the party on 30 November 2000.

== Early life ==
Elder was born in Melbourne. Before his election he was the Queensland manager for an access and scaffolding company, and was the first team manager for the Brisbane Broncos rugby league team.

== Political career ==
Having been elected in 1989, he was appointed Minister for Business, Industry and Regional Development in 1992, serving until 1995. From February to July of that year he was Minister for Health, and moved to Transport until the Goss Government left office in February 1996.

After the resignation of the Goss government and the ALP moving to the opposition benches, he became deputy opposition leader, holding the portfolio of Transport, Youth, Sport and Recreation; his responsibilities were changed to Business, Industry and Transport in December 1996.

Following the election of the Beattie government in 1998 he became Deputy Premier and Minister for State Development and Trade.

On 22 November 2000, Elder resigned as deputy premier in response to the Criminal Justice Commission's statement that he would be interviewed by the Shepherdson inquiry into electoral fraud. He resigned from the ALP on 30 November to sit as an independent and did not recontest his seat at the 2001 state election.

== Later career ==
Elder later worked as a lobbyist. He was the co-owner of lobbying firm Enhance Group with Trevor Rowe.

Parliament of Queensland
Preceded by Eric Shaw	Member for Manly; 1989–1992	Succeeded by Abolished
Preceded by New seat	Member for Capalaba; 1992–2001	Succeeded by Michael Choi
