= Electoral district of Mansfield =

State electoral district of Queensland, Australia

Mansfield Queensland—Legislative Assembly
- Electoral map of Mansfield 2017
- State: Queensland
- MP: Corrine McMillan
- Party: Labor Party
- Namesake: Mansfield
- Electors: 35,064 (2020)
- Area: 70 km^{2} (27.0 sq mi)
- Demographic: Inner-metropolitan
- Coordinates: 27°34′S 153°8′E
Electorates around Mansfield:
Miller; Greenslopes	Chatsworth	Chatsworth
Toohey	Mansfield	Capalaba
Toohey	Waterford	Springwood

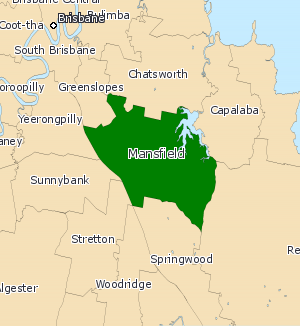
Electoral map of Mansfield 2008

Mansfield is an electoral district of the Legislative Assembly in the Australian state of Queensland.

The district is based in the south-eastern suburbs of Brisbane. It is named for the suburb of Mansfield and also includes the suburbs of Burbank, Rochedale and Wishart. The electorate was first created for the 1972 election.

Mansfield has tended to be a seat held by the government of the day; only two of its members have served in opposition.

== Members for Mansfield ==
Member	Party	Term
Bill Kaus	Liberal	1972–1983
Bill Kaus	National	1983–1986
Craig Sherrin	National	1986–1989
Laurel Power	Labor	1989–1995
Frank Carroll	Liberal	1995–1998
Phil Reeves	Labor	1998–2012
Ian Walker	Liberal National	2012–2017
Corrine McMillan	Labor	2017–present

== Election results ==
2024 Queensland state election: Mansfield
Party	Candidate	Votes	%	±%
Labor	Corrine McMillan	13,674	42.60	−3.54
Liberal National	Pinky Singh	12,237	38.12	−0.31
Greens	Wen Li	3,776	11.76	+2.16
One Nation	Katrina Coleman	1,490	4.64	+2.33
Family First	Anthony Ross Dovey	924	2.88	+2.88
Total formal votes		32,101	96.93	−0.47
Informal votes		1,017	3.07	+0.47
Turnout		33,118	90.48	+0.01
Two-party-preferred result
Labor	Corrine McMillan	17,620	54.89	−1.91
Liberal National	Pinky Singh	14,481	45.11	+1.91
Labor hold		Swing	−1.91	

Primary vote results in Mansfield (Parties that have never gotten 5% of the vote are omitted)
Labor
Liberal National
Liberal
National
Greens
Family First
One Nation
Progress
Queensland Labor
Independent
View source data.
Two-candidate-preferred vote results in Mansfield View source data.
