= Electoral results for the district of Redcliffe =

Queensland, Australia, district election results

This is a list of electoral results for the electoral district of Redcliffe in Queensland state elections.

== Members for Redcliffe ==
Member	Party	Term
Jim Houghton	Independent	1960–1960
Jim Houghton	Liberal	1960–1961
Jim Houghton	Independent	1961–1962
Jim Houghton	Country	1963–1974
Jim Houghton	National	1974–1979
Terry White	Liberal	1979–1989
Ray Hollis	Labor	1989–2005
Terry Rogers	Liberal	2005–2006
Lillian van Litsenburg	Labor	2006–2012
Scott Driscoll	Liberal National	2012–2013
Scott Driscoll	Independent	2013
Yvette D'Ath	Labor	2014–2024
Kerri-Anne Dooley	Liberal National	2024–present

== Election results ==
=== Elections in the 2020s ===
2024 Queensland state election: Redcliffe
Party	Candidate	Votes	%	±%
Liberal National	Kerri-Anne Dooley	15,851	44.43	+7.13
Labor	Kass Hall	12,805	35.89	−11.01
Greens	Will Simon	3,257	9.13	+1.93
One Nation	Simon Salloum	2,654	7.44	+3.04
Independent	Gerard Saunders	1,110	3.11	+3.11
Total formal votes		35,677	95.94	
Informal votes		1,508	4.06	
Turnout		37,185	88.60	
Two-party-preferred result
Liberal National	Kerri-Anne Dooley	18,879	52.92	+9.02
Labor	Kass Hall	16,798	47.08	−9.02
Liberal National gain from Labor		Swing	+9.02	

2020 Queensland state election: Redcliffe
Party	Candidate	Votes	%	±%
Labor	Yvette D'Ath	15,371	46.93	+1.73
Liberal National	Kerri-Anne Dooley	12,231	37.34	+0.10
Greens	Will Simon	2,364	7.22	−0.76
One Nation	Virginia Davy	1,427	4.36	+4.36
Independent	Ian Philp	694	2.12	−1.43
Independent	Carolyn Kerr	352	1.07	+1.07
United Australia	Bob Blohberger	314	0.96	+0.96
Total formal votes		32,753	96.91	+1.57
Informal votes		1,044	3.09	−1.57
Turnout		33,797	87.58	−0.04
Two-party-preferred result
Labor	Yvette D'Ath	18,377	56.11	+1.25
Liberal National	Kerri-Anne Dooley	14,376	43.89	−1.25
Labor hold		Swing	+1.25	

=== Elections in the 2010s ===
2017 Queensland state election: Redcliffe
Party	Candidate	Votes	%	±%
Labor	Yvette D'Ath	13,851	45.2	−2.0
Liberal National	Kerri-Anne Dooley	11,414	37.2	−0.5
Greens	James Bovill	2,446	8.0	+2.4
Independent	Ian Philp	1,087	3.5	+3.5
Independent	Graham Young	1,078	3.5	+3.5
Independent	Shayne Jarvis	770	2.5	+0.2
Total formal votes		30,646	95.3	−2.7
Informal votes		1,498	4.7	+2.7
Turnout		32,144	87.6	−0.6
Two-party-preferred result
Labor	Yvette D'Ath	16,811	54.9	−2.7
Liberal National	Kerri-Anne Dooley	13,835	45.1	+2.7
Labor hold		Swing	−2.7	

2015 Queensland state election: Redcliffe
Party	Candidate	Votes	%	±%
Labor	Yvette D'Ath	14,399	47.24	+16.48
Liberal National	Kerri-Anne Dooley	11,497	37.72	−11.52
Greens	Peter Johnson	1,698	5.57	−1.16
Palmer United	Steven Griffith	1,477	4.85	+4.85
Family First	Mark A White	710	2.33	−2.20
Independent	Shayne Jarvis	701	2.30	+2.30
Total formal votes		30,482	98.01	+0.39
Informal votes		620	1.99	−0.39
Turnout		31,102	90.98	−0.13
Two-party-preferred result
Labor	Yvette D'Ath	16,602	57.58	+17.68
Liberal National	Kerri-Anne Dooley	12,230	42.42	−17.68
Labor gain from Liberal National		Swing	+17.68	

2014 Redcliffe state by-election
Party	Candidate	Votes	%	±%
Labor	Yvette D'Ath	12,437	44.6	+13.9
Liberal National	Kerri-Anne Dooley	9,724	34.9	–14.4
Independent Palmer United	Len Thomas	2,837	10.2	+10.2
Greens	John Marshall	1,064	3.8	–2.9
Family First	Sally Vincent	675	2.4	–2.1
Independent	Talosaga McMahon	345	1.2	+1.2
Independent	Liz Woollard	327	1.2	+1.2
Independent Liberal Democrat	Gabriel Buckley	268	1.0	+1.0
Independent	Andrew Tyrrell	205	0.7	+0.7
Total formal votes		27,882	97.7	+0.1
Informal votes		665	2.3	–0.1
Turnout		28,547	86.1	–5.0
Two-party-preferred result
Labor	Yvette D'Ath	14,043	57.1	+17.2
Liberal National	Kerri-Anne Dooley	10,540	42.9	–17.2
Labor gain from Liberal National		Swing	+17.2	

2012 Queensland state election: Redcliffe
Party	Candidate	Votes	%	±%
Liberal National	Scott Driscoll	13,991	49.24	+14.94
Labor	Lillian van Litsenburg	8,739	30.76	−12.26
Katter's Australian	Bevan Collingwood	2,484	8.74	+8.74
Greens	Noel Clothier	1,912	6.73	+0.61
Family First	Kerri-Anne Dooley	1,288	4.53	+1.91
Total formal votes		28,414	97.61	−0.42
Informal votes		695	2.39	+0.42
Turnout		29,109	91.11	+0.21
Two-party-preferred result
Liberal National	Scott Driscoll	15,427	60.10	+15.67
Labor	Lillian van Litsenburg	10,242	39.90	−15.67
Liberal National gain from Labor		Swing	+15.67	

=== Elections in the 2000s ===
2009 Queensland state election: Redcliffe
Party	Candidate	Votes	%	±%
Labor	Lillian van Litsenburg	12,202	43.0	−6.5
Liberal National	Bill Gollan	9,727	34.3	−4.9
Independent	Peter Houston	3,953	13.9	+13.9
Greens	Pete Johnson	1,737	6.1	−4.3
Family First	Philip Cramer	743	2.6	+2.6
Total formal votes		28,362	97.9	
Informal votes		569	2.1	
Turnout		28,931	90.9	
Two-party-preferred result
Labor	Lillian van Litsenburg	13,943	55.6	−0.5
Liberal National	Bill Gollan	11,146	44.4	+0.5
Labor hold		Swing	−0.5	

2006 Queensland state election: Redcliffe
Party	Candidate	Votes	%	±%
Labor	Lillian van Litsenburg	11,794	49.2	−0.9
Liberal	Terry Rogers	9,581	40.0	+4.4
Greens	Pete Johnson	2,589	10.8	+10.8
Total formal votes		23,964	97.8	+0.1
Informal votes		550	2.2	−0.1
Turnout		24,514	92.3	−0.4
Two-party-preferred result
Labor	Lillian van Litsenburg	12,545	55.4	−1.7
Liberal	Terry Rogers	10,080	44.6	+1.7
Labor hold		Swing	−1.7	

2005 Redcliffe state by-election
Party	Candidate	Votes	%	±%
Liberal	Terry Rogers	9,425	41.17	+5.54
Labor	Lillian van Litsenburg	9,076	39.65	−10.43
Greens	Pete Johnson	1,467	6.41	+6.41
Independent	Terry Shaw	1,171	5.12	+5.12
Independent	Rob McJannett	869	3.80	−10.49
One Nation	Susan Meredith	762	3.33	+3.33
Independent	Rod McDonough	121	0.53	+0.53
Total formal votes		22,891	97.65	−0.01
Informal votes		550	2.35	+0.01
Turnout		23,441	87.78	−4.93
Two-party-preferred result
Liberal	Terry Rogers	10,466	51.25	+8.35
Labor	Lillian van Litsenburg	9,955	48.75	−8.35
Liberal gain from Labor		Swing	+8.35	

2004 Queensland state election: Redcliffe
Party	Candidate	Votes	%	±%
Labor	Ray Hollis	12,062	50.1	−6.5
Liberal	Terry Rogers	8,582	35.6	+12.2
Independent	Rob McJannett	3,441	14.3	+14.3
Total formal votes		24,085	97.7	+0.1
Informal votes		578	2.3	−0.1
Turnout		24,663	92.7	−0.2
Two-party-preferred result
Labor	Ray Hollis	12,668	57.1	−10.5
Liberal	Terry Rogers	9,518	42.9	+10.5
Labor hold		Swing	−10.5	

2001 Queensland state election: Redcliffe
Party	Candidate	Votes	%	±%
Labor	Ray Hollis	13,989	56.6	+13.0
Liberal	Peter Rankin	5,789	23.4	−5.5
Independent	Rae Frawley	3,232	13.1	+13.1
City Country Alliance	Peter Salisbury	866	3.5	+3.5
Independent	Robert White	604	2.4	+2.4
Independent	Len Matthews	255	1.0	+1.0
Total formal votes		24,735	97.6	
Informal votes		606	2.4	
Turnout		25,341	92.9	
Two-party-preferred result
Labor	Ray Hollis	14,633	67.6	+13.7
Liberal	Peter Rankin	7,011	32.4	−13.7
Labor hold		Swing	+13.7	

=== Elections in the 1990s ===
1998 Queensland state election: Redcliffe
Party	Candidate	Votes	%	±%
Labor	Ray Hollis	8,136	42.5	−2.1
Liberal	Allan Sutherland	5,864	30.6	−9.5
One Nation	Phil Knight	4,370	22.8	+22.8
Independent	Bill Turner	453	2.4	+2.4
Reform	Terry Fleming	324	1.7	+1.7
Total formal votes		19,147	98.5	+0.7
Informal votes		287	1.5	−0.7
Turnout		19,434	92.9	+1.4
Two-party-preferred result
Labor	Ray Hollis	9,349	52.3	+1.9
Liberal	Allan Sutherland	8,522	47.7	−1.9
Labor hold		Swing	+1.9	

1995 Queensland state election: Redcliffe
Party	Candidate	Votes	%	±%
Labor	Ray Hollis	8,309	44.6	−8.9
Liberal	Judy Beresford	7,468	40.1	+12.8
Independent	Maureen Tyler	1,654	8.9	+8.9
Democrats	John Curtin	837	4.5	+4.5
Independent	Leonard Matthews	356	1.9	+1.9
Total formal votes		18,624	97.8	+0.6
Informal votes		422	2.2	−0.6
Turnout		19,046	91.5	
Two-party-preferred result
Labor	Ray Hollis	8,979	50.4	−8.2
Liberal	Judy Beresford	8,843	49.6	+8.2
Labor hold		Swing	−8.2	

1992 Queensland state election: Redcliffe
Party	Candidate	Votes	%	±%
Labor	Ray Hollis	10,537	53.5	+2.8
Liberal	Allan Sutherland	5,366	27.2	−13.4
National	Alan Boulton	2,464	12.5	+6.5
Independent	Steven Griffith	1,327	6.7	+6.7
Total formal votes		19,694	97.1	−0.6
Informal votes		578	2.9	+0.6
Turnout		20,272	92.1	+0.3
Two-party-preferred result
Labor	Ray Hollis	11,113	58.6	+6.6
Liberal	Allan Sutherland	7,867	41.4	−6.6
Labor hold		Swing	+6.6	

=== Elections in the 1980s ===
1989 Queensland state election: Redcliffe
Party	Candidate	Votes	%	±%
Labor	Ray Hollis	9,917	50.7	+10.1
Liberal	Terry White	7,944	40.6	−2.9
National	Robert Quinn	1,165	6.0	−14.3
Independent	Jenny Ballantine-Morr	532	2.7	+2.7
Total formal votes		19,558	97.7	−0.6
Informal votes		459	2.3	+0.6
Turnout		20,017	91.8	−0.6
Two-party-preferred result
Labor	Ray Hollis	10,170	52.0	+9.7
Liberal	Terry White	9,388	48.0	−9.7
Labor gain from Liberal		Swing	+9.7	

1986 Queensland state election: Redcliffe
Party	Candidate	Votes	%	±%
Labor	Peter Houston	7,193	40.6	−4.4
Liberal	Terry White	6,680	37.7	−17.3
National	Richard Procter	3,598	20.3	+20.3
Independent	Murray Rutherford	257	1.5	+1.5
Total formal votes		17,728	98.3	+1.1
Informal votes		311	1.7	−1.1
Turnout		18,039	92.4	−0.2
Two-party-preferred result
Liberal	Terry White	10,230	57.7	+2.7
Labor	Peter Houston	7,498	42.3	−2.7
Liberal hold		Swing	+2.7	

1983 Queensland state election: Redcliffe
Party	Candidate	Votes	%	±%
Liberal	Terry White	8,583	55.0	−0.3
Labor	Peter Houston	7,023	45.0	+0.3
Total formal votes		15,606	97.2	−1.2
Informal votes		448	2.8	+1.2
Turnout		16,054	92.6	+0.6
Liberal hold		Swing	−0.3	

1980 Queensland state election: Redcliffe
Party	Candidate	Votes	%	±%
Liberal	Terry White	8,599	55.3	+26.0
Labor	Roderick Lugton	6,941	44.7	+7.6
Total formal votes		15,540	98.4	−0.2
Informal votes		248	1.6	+0.2
Turnout		15,788	92.0	−0.6
Liberal gain from National		Swing	N/A	

=== Elections in the 1970s ===
1977 Queensland state election: Redcliffe
Party	Candidate	Votes	%	±%
Labor	Roderick Lugton	5,566	37.1	+1.2
National	Jim Houghton	4,797	31.9	−18.6
Liberal	Terry White	4,406	29.3	+29.3
Progress	Gregory Gaffney	246	1.6	+1.6
Total formal votes		15,015	98.6	
Informal votes		218	1.4	
Turnout		15,233	92.6	
Two-party-preferred result
National	Jim Houghton	8,433	56.2	−5.8
Labor	Roderick Lugton	6,582	43.8	+5.8
National hold		Swing	−5.8	

1974 Queensland state election: Redcliffe
Party	Candidate	Votes	%	±%
National	Jim Houghton	6,921	50.5	+17.1
Labor	Jack Trueman	4,915	35.9	−5.8
Independent	George Wise	1,528	11.2	+11.2
Queensland Labor	Paul Maguire	334	2.4	−3.2
Total formal votes		13,698	98.5	−0.1
Informal votes		211	1.5	+0.1
Turnout		13,909	90.4	−2.5
Two-party-preferred result
National	Jim Houghton	8,513	62.1	+6.7
Labor	Jack Trueman	5,185	37.9	−6.7
National hold		Swing	+6.7	

1972 Queensland state election: Redcliffe
Party	Candidate	Votes	%	±%
Labor	Jack Trueman	5,218	41.7	+2.3
Country	Jim Houghton	4,179	33.4	−20.2
Liberal	John Hodges	2,415	19.3	+19.3
Queensland Labor	Thomas Grundy	709	5.6	−1.4
Total formal votes		12,521	98.6	
Informal votes		177	1.4	
Turnout		12,698	92.9	
Two-party-preferred result
Country	Jim Houghton	6,932	55.4	−5.5
Labor	Jack Trueman	5,589	44.6	+5.5
Country hold		Swing	−5.5	

=== Elections in the 1960s ===
1969 Queensland state election: Redcliffe
Party	Candidate	Votes	%	±%
Country	Jim Houghton	7,232	53.6	+8.5
Labor	Jack Trueman	5,313	39.4	+0.9
Queensland Labor	James Morrissey	952	7.0	+0.8
Total formal votes		13,497	98.6	+0.3
Informal votes		194	1.4	−0.3
Turnout		13,691	92.5	−0.5
Two-party-preferred result
Country	Jim Houghton	8,007	59.3	+0.6
Labor	Jack Trueman	5,490	40.7	−0.6
Country hold		Swing	+0.6	

1966 Queensland state election: Redcliffe
Party	Candidate	Votes	%	±%
Country	Jim Houghton	5,292	45.1	−10.3
Labor	William Hunter	4,514	38.5	+3.0
Liberal	Robert Elder	1,206	10.3	+10.3
Queensland Labor	James Morrissey	726	6.2	+1.1
Total formal votes		11,738	98.3	+0.1
Informal votes		204	1.7	−0.1
Turnout		11,942	93.0	−1.0
Two-party-preferred result
Country	Jim Houghton	6,895	58.7	−3.0
Labor	William Hunter	4,843	41.3	+3.0
Country hold		Swing	−3.0	

1963 Queensland state election: Redcliffe
Party	Candidate	Votes	%	±%
Country	Jim Houghton	5,772	55.4	+30.6
Labor	Colin McInnes	3,697	35.5	+10.7
Queensland Labor	Michael Doyle	527	5.1	−0.7
Independent	Eric Pritchard	329	3.2	+3.2
Independent	Ernest Sykes	88	0.8	+0.8
Total formal votes		10,413	98.2	−0.7
Informal votes		195	1.8	+0.7
Turnout		10,608	94.0	+1.7
Two-party-preferred result
Country	Jim Houghton	6,425	61.7	
Labor	Colin McInnes	3,988	38.3	
Country gain from Independent		Swing	N/A	

1960 Queensland state election: Redcliffe
Party	Candidate	Votes	%	±%
Independent	Jim Houghton	4,047	42.0	
Country	Seymour Gomersall	2,394	24.8	
Labor	Kenneth Griffith	2,178	22.6	
Queensland Labor	Edward Dignan	556	5.8	
Independent	Alexander Black	470	4.9	
Total formal votes		9,645	98.9	
Informal votes		109	1.1	
Turnout		9,754	92.3	
Independent win		(new seat)		
