= Candidates of the 2006 Queensland state election =

This article provides details on candidates preselected for the 2006 Queensland state election which was held on 9 September 2006.

== By-elections ==
- On 20 August 2005, Terry Rogers (Liberal) was elected to succeed Ray Hollis (Labor), who resigned on 21 July 2005, as the member for Redcliffe.
- On 20 August 2005, Michael Caltabiano (Liberal) was elected to succeed Terry Mackenroth (Labor), who resigned on 25 July 2005, as the member for Chatsworth.
- On 1 April 2006, Alex Douglas (National) was elected to succeed Robert Poole (Labor), who resigned on 28 February 2006, as the member for Gaven.

== Retiring Members ==
=== Labor ===
- Tom Barton (Waterford)
- Darryl Briskey (Cleveland)
- Lesley Clark (Barron River)
- Nita Cunningham (Bundaberg)
- Jim Fouras (Ashgrove)
- Don Livingstone (Ipswich West)
- Tony McGrady (Mount Isa)
- Gordon Nuttall (Sandgate)
- Henry Palaszczuk (Inala)
- Terry Sullivan (Stafford)

=== Liberal ===
- Bob Quinn (Robina)

=== National ===
- Marc Rowell (Hinchinbrook)

== Legislative Assembly ==
Sitting members are shown in bold text. Successful candidates are highlighted in the relevant colour.

Electorate	Held by	Labor candidate	Coalition candidate	Greens candidate	Other candidates
Albert	Labor	**Margaret Keech**	Karen Woodrow (Lib)	Marella Pettinato	Jonathan Eaton (FFP)
Algester	Labor	**Karen Struthers**	William Tan (Lib)	Gary Crocker	
Ashgrove	Labor	Kate Jones	Glenn Kiddle (Lib)	Dean Love	
Aspley	Labor	**Bonny Barry**	Tracy Davis (Lib)	James White	Bruce Kent (Ind)
Barron River	Labor	Steve Wettenhall	Stephen Welsh (Lib)	Denis Walls	Peter Todd (Ind)
Beaudesert	National	Brett Raguse	**Kev Lingard** (Nat)	Andy Grodecki	
Brisbane Central	Labor	**Peter Beattie**	Craig Thomas (Lib)	Larissa Waters	
Broadwater	Labor	**Peta-Kaye Croft**	John Caris (Lib)	Julie-Ann Teluk	Maurie Carroll (Ind); Lesley Millar (ONP)
Bulimba	Labor	**Pat Purcell**	Angela Julian-Armitage (Lib)	Howard Nielsen	
Bundaberg	Labor	Sonja Cleary	Jack Dempsey (Nat)	Willy Bach	
Bundamba	Labor	**Jo-Ann Miller**	Paul Cole (Lib)	Jim Prentice	Greg McMahon (Ind)
Burdekin	National	Steve Rodgers	**Rosemary Menkens** (Nat)	Anja Light	Amanda Nickson (FFP)
Burleigh	Labor	**Christine Smith**	Michael Hart (Lib)	Mike Beale	
Burnett	National	Denise Williams	**Rob Messenger** (Nat)		
Cairns	Labor	**Desley Boyle**	Wendy Richardson (Lib)	Steven Nowakowski	Michael Mansfield (Ind); Peter Sandercock (Ind)
Callide	National	Mikey Oliver	**Jeff Seeney** (Nat)		
Caloundra	Liberal	Tony Moor	**Mark McArdle** (Lib)	Dave Norris	
Capalaba	Labor	**Michael Choi**	Trish Symons (Lib)	Greg Thomas	
Charters Towers	National	Bruce Scott	**Shane Knuth** (Nat)		
Chatsworth	Liberal	Chris Bombolas	**Michael Caltabiano** (Lib)	Elissa Jenkins	
Clayfield	Labor	**Liddy Clark**	Tim Nicholls (Lib)	Justin Wells	Erik Eriksen (Ind); Brad Gradwell (Ind)
Cleveland	Labor	Phil Weightman	Andrew Trim (Lib)	Robyn Thomas	Shane Boese (Ind)
Cook	Labor	**Jason O'Brien**	Peter Scott (Nat)	Nev St John-Wood	
Cunningham	National	Nicholas Holiday	**Stuart Copeland** (Nat)	Rian Muller	
Currumbin	Liberal	Michael Riordan	**Jann Stuckey** (Lib)	Inge Light	Peter Findlay (FFP)
Darling Downs	National	David Nelson	**Ray Hopper** (Nat)		David Totenhoefer (FFP)
Everton	Labor	**Rod Welford**	Ken King (Lib)	Bruce Hallett	Dale Shuttleworth (FFP)
Ferny Grove	Labor	**Geoff Wilson**	Jamie Patterson (Lib)	Di Clark	Mark White (FFP)
Fitzroy	Labor	**Jim Pearce**	John Engwicht (Nat)		David Foster (Ind)
Gaven	National	Phil Gray	**Alex Douglas** (Nat)	Glen Ryman	
Gladstone	Independent	Chris Trevor	John Todd (Nat)		**Liz Cunningham** (Ind)
Glass House	Labor	**Carolyn Male**	Ken Piva (Nat)	Roger Callen	Justin Blowes (FFP)
Greenslopes	Labor	**Gary Fenlon**	Melina Morgan (Lib)	Darryl Rosin	Warren Simondson (Ind)
Gregory	National	Shane Guley	**Vaughan Johnson** (Nat)		Julie-Anne Evans (Ind); Ross Grierson (FFP)
Gympie	Independent	Jonathan Persley	David Gibson (Nat)	Paul Marshall	Greg Houghton (ONP); **Elisa Roberts** (Ind); Beryl Spencer (FFP)
Hervey Bay	Labor	**Andrew McNamara**	Jan Rohozinski (Nat)	Matt Stevenson	Elizabeth Benson-Stott (FFP); Peter Schuback (Ind)
Hinchinbrook	National	Steve Kilburn	Andrew Cripps (Nat)	Fay McKenzie	
Inala	Labor	Annastacia Palaszczuk	Peter Matic (Lib)	Bob East	
Indooroopilly	Labor	**Ronan Lee**	Peter Turner (Lib)	Judy Petroeschevsky	
Ipswich	Labor	**Rachel Nolan**	Simon Pointer (Lib)	Rob Spiers	
Ipswich West	Labor	Wayne Wendt	Sean Choat (Lib)	Bill Livermore	Brian Branch (Ind); Barbara Brown (FFP)
Kallangur	Labor	**Ken Hayward**	Fiona Brydon (Nat)	Rachel Doherty	
Kawana	Labor	**Chris Cummins**	Steve Dickson (Lib)	Lindsay Holt	
Keppel	Labor	**Paul Hoolihan**	Mary Carroll (Nat)	John McKeon	Judy Canales (Ind); Valle Checa (Ind); Peter Draper (Ind); Scott Kilpatrick (FFP)
Kurwongbah	Labor	**Linda Lavarch**	Terry Orreal (Nat)	Terry Jones	
Lockyer	National	John Kelly	**Ian Rickuss** (Nat)	Luc Myller	Helen Muller (FFP)
Logan	Labor	**John Mickel**	Belinda Goodwin (Nat)	Jessica Brown	Robert Prizen-Wood (FFP)
Lytton	Labor	**Paul Lucas**	Amanda Wiklund (Lib)	David Wyatt	
Mackay	Labor	**Tim Mulherin**	Craig Joy (Nat)	Michele Graham	Archie Julien (Ind)
Mansfield	Labor	**Phil Reeves**	Glen Ryan (Lib)	Gary McMahon	Geoff Grounds (FFP)
Maroochydore	National	Debbie Blumel	**Fiona Simpson** (Nat)	KC Robinson	
Maryborough	Independent	Peter Allen	Damien Tessmann (Nat)	Steve Walker	**Chris Foley** (Ind)
Mirani	National	Debrah Green	**Ted Malone** (Nat)		Rob Robinson (Ind)
Moggill	Liberal	Lisa Reyner	**Bruce Flegg** (Lib)	Geoff Munck	
Mount Coot-tha	Labor	**Andrew Fraser**	James Mackay (Lib)	Juanita Wheeler	
Mount Gravatt	Labor	**Judy Spence**	Nick Monsour (Lib)	Daniel Crute	J. F. Barnes (Ind); Matt Darragh (FFP)
Mount Isa	Labor	Betty Kiernan	Roy Collins (Lib)		Merlin Manners (FFP)
Mount Ommaney	Labor	**Julie Attwood**	Bob Harper (Lib)	Jos Hall	
Mudgeeraba	Labor	**Dianne Reilly**	Ros Bates (Lib)	Gary Pead	James Tayler (FFP)
Mulgrave	Labor	**Warren Pitt**	Krista Dunford (Nat)		
Mundingburra	Labor	**Lindy Nelson-Carr**	Mick Reilly (Lib)	Jenny Stirling	
Murrumba	Labor	**Dean Wells**	Reg Gulley (Lib)	Michael Jeffrey	Terry Shaw (Ind)
Nanango	Independent	Mark Whittaker	John Bjelke-Petersen (Nat)		Trevor Dent (FFP); **Dorothy Pratt*** (Ind)
Nicklin	Independent	Matt Rocks	Steve Morrison (Nat)	Katherine Webb	**Peter Wellington** (Ind)
Noosa	Labor	John O'Connor	Glen Elmes (Lib)	Jennie Harvie	John CHapman (FFP); **Cate Molloy** (Ind); John Rivett (Ind)
Nudgee	Labor	**Neil Roberts**	Max Swanson (Lib)	Noel Clothier	
Pumicestone	Labor	**Carryn Sullivan**	Shane Moon (Lib)	Lyn Dickinson	
Redcliffe	Liberal	Lillian van Litsenburg	**Terry Rogers** (Lib)	Peter Johnson	
Redlands	Labor	**John English**	Russell Biddle (Lib)	Brad Scott	John Hegarty (Ind)
Robina	Liberal	Elizabeth Pommer	Ray Stevens (Lib)	Lara Pape	
Rockhampton	Labor	**Robert Schwarten**	Robert Mills (Nat)		
Sandgate	Labor	Vicky Darling	Alan Boulton (Lib)	Peter Fagan	Sally Vincent (FFP)
South Brisbane	Labor	**Anna Bligh**	Lynne Jennings (Lib)	Gary Kane	
Southern Downs	National	Andrew Myles	**Lawrence Springborg** (Nat)		
Southport	Labor	**Peter Lawlor**	Bob Bennett (Nat)	Carla Brandon	
Springwood	Labor	**Barbara Stone**	Peter Collins (Lib)	Neil Cotter	Lesley Noah (Ind)
Stafford	Labor	Stirling Hinchliffe	Brad Carswell (Lib)	Sam Clifford	
Stretton	Labor	**Stephen Robertson**	Scott Furlong (Lib)	Jane Cajdler	
Surfers Paradise	Liberal	Guy Jones	**John-Paul Langbroek** (Lib)	Dean Hepburn	
Tablelands	One Nation	Denis McKinley	George Adil (Nat)	Paul Parker	Troy Howard (FFP); **Rosa Lee Long** (ONP)
Thuringowa	Labor	**Craig Wallace**	Rod Hardacre (Nat)	Frank Reilly	Bill Hankin (ONP)
Toowoomba North	Labor	**Kerry Shine**	Lyle Shelton (Nat)	Greg Keane	Archie Franz (FFP); George Westgarth (Ind)
Toowoomba South	National	Frank Burke	**Mike Horan** (Nat)	Christine Tuppurainen	Peter Hicks (FFP)
Townsville	Labor	**Mike Reynolds**	Jessica Weber (Lib)	John Boucher	Steve Todeschini (Ind)
Warrego	National	Marlene Johansen	**Howard Hobbs** (Nat)		Troy Kusters (FFP); Ruth Spencer (Ind)
Waterford	Labor	Evan Moorhead	Tracey Elson (Lib)	Stan Cajdler	Sue Price (Ind)
Whitsunday	Labor	**Jan Jarratt**	Paul Joice (Nat)	Masha Marjanovich	Mike Stone (Ind)
Woodridge	Labor	**Desley Scott**	Sarina Patane (Lib)	John Reddington	Jamie Pentsa (FFP)
Yeerongpilly	Labor	**Simon Finn**	Marie Jackson (Lib)	Sean McConnell	

== See also ==
- Members of the Queensland Legislative Assembly, 2004-2006
- 2006 Queensland state election
