= Results of the 2006 Queensland state election =

Queensland state election, 9 September 2006 Legislative Assembly << 2004–2009 >>
Enrolled voters	2,484,479				
Votes cast	2,247,728		Turnout	90.47	–0.97
Informal votes	43,657		Informal	2.08	+0.09
Summary of votes by party
Party	Primary votes	%	Swing	Seats	Change
Labor	1,032,617	46.92	–0.09	59	–4
Liberal	442,453	20.10	+1.60	8	+3
National	392,124	17.82	+0.86	17	+2
Greens	175,798	7.99	+1.23	0	±0
Family First	41,659	1.89	+1.89	0	±0
One Nation	13,207	0.60	–4.28	1	±0
Independent	103,022	4.68	–1.15	4	–1
Total	2,200,880			89	
Two-party-preferred
Labor		55.0			
Liberal		45.0			

This is a list of electoral district results for the Queensland 2006 election.

== Results by electoral district ==
=== Albert ===
2006 Queensland state election: Albert
Party	Candidate	Votes	%	±%
Labor	Margaret Keech	17,429	60.0	+0.0
Liberal	Karen Woodrow	8,161	28.1	+0.5
Greens	Marella Pettinato	1,799	6.2	+0.9
Family First	Jonathon Eaton	1,682	5.8	+5.8
Total formal votes		29,071	97.4	−0.0
Informal votes		789	2.6	+0.0
Turnout		29,860	89.6	−1.1
Two-party-preferred result
Labor	Margaret Keech	18,312	67.0	−0.3
Liberal	Karen Woodrow	9,017	33.0	+0.3
Labor hold		Swing	−0.3	

=== Algester ===
2006 Queensland state election: Algester
Party	Candidate	Votes	%	±%
Labor	Karen Struthers	17,578	62.0	+1.1
Liberal	William Tan	8,124	28.6	+1.0
Greens	Gary Crocker	2,669	9.4	+3.4
Total formal votes		28,371	98.0	+0.3
Informal votes		574	2.0	−0.3
Turnout		28,945	91.8	−0.7
Two-party-preferred result
Labor	Karen Struthers	18,420	67.8	−0.2
Liberal	William Tan	8,732	32.2	+0.2
Labor hold		Swing	−0.2	

=== Ashgrove ===
2006 Queensland state election: Ashgrove
Party	Candidate	Votes	%	±%
Labor	Kate Jones	11,523	47.6	−5.7
Liberal	Glenn Kiddle	8,836	36.5	+5.8
Greens	Dean Love	3,835	15.9	−0.1
Total formal votes		24,194	98.4	+0.3
Informal votes		381	1.6	−0.3
Turnout		24,575	90.9	−0.6
Two-party-preferred result
Labor	Kate Jones	13,299	58.1	−6.6
Liberal	Glenn Kiddle	9,599	41.9	+6.6
Labor hold		Swing	−6.6	

=== Aspley ===
2006 Queensland state election: Aspley
Party	Candidate	Votes	%	±%
Labor	Bonny Barry	12,714	49.5	−0.8
Liberal	Tracy Davis	10,730	41.7	−1.2
Greens	James White	1,710	6.7	−0.1
Independent	Bruce Kent	555	2.2	+2.2
Total formal votes		25,709	98.3	−0.0
Informal votes		442	1.7	+0.0
Turnout		26,151	92.4	−0.9
Two-party-preferred result
Labor	Bonny Barry	13,507	54.6	+0.3
Liberal	Tracy Davis	11,226	45.4	−0.3
Labor hold		Swing	+0.3	

=== Barron River ===
2006 Queensland state election: Barron River
Party	Candidate	Votes	%	±%
Labor	Steve Wettenhall	9,901	41.6	−0.7
Liberal	Stephen Welsh	8,244	34.6	−3.5
Greens	Denis Walls	3,162	13.3	+2.7
Fishing Party	Peter Todd	2,517	10.6	+10.6
Total formal votes		23,824	97.7	−0.4
Informal votes		570	2.3	+0.4
Turnout		24,394	88.3	−2.4
Two-party-preferred result
Labor	Steve Wettenhall	12,091	55.1	+2.0
Liberal	Stephen Welsh	9,838	44.9	−2.0
Labor hold		Swing	+2.0	

=== Beaudesert ===
2006 Queensland state election: Beaudesert
Party	Candidate	Votes	%	±%
National	Kev Lingard	14,250	49.2	+0.6
Labor	Brett Raguse	11,413	39.4	+5.5
Greens	Andy Grodecki	3,326	11.5	+4.5
Total formal votes		28,989	98.0	−0.3
Informal votes		598	2.0	−0.3
Turnout		29,587	91.8	−1.0
Two-party-preferred result
National	Kev Lingard	14,944	54.5	−3.6
Labor	Brett Raguse	12,483	45.5	+3.6
National hold		Swing	−3.6	

=== Brisbane Central ===
2006 Queensland state election: Brisbane Central
Party	Candidate	Votes	%	±%
Labor	Peter Beattie	13,563	50.5	−7.8
Liberal	Craig Thomas	7,748	28.8	+2.7
Greens	Larissa Waters	4,912	18.3	+6.0
Independent	Sam Watson	500	1.9	+1.9
Independent	Alan Skyring	145	0.5	+0.0
Total formal votes		26,868	98.5	+0.1
Informal votes		415	1.5	−0.1
Turnout		27,283	84.7	+0.0
Two-party-preferred result
Labor	Peter Beattie	15,888	64.8	−4.8
Liberal	Craig Thomas	8,642	35.2	+4.8
Labor hold		Swing	−4.8	

=== Broadwater ===
2006 Queensland state election: Broadwater
Party	Candidate	Votes	%	±%
Labor	Peta-Kaye Croft	13,442	51.2	+1.9
Liberal	John Caris	10,926	41.6	+41.6
Greens	Julie-Ann Teluk	1,284	4.9	+0.6
One Nation	Lesley Pocock	437	1.7	−3.4
Independent	Maurie Carroll	184	0.7	+0.7
Total formal votes		26,273	97.9	−0.2
Informal votes		571	2.1	+0.2
Turnout		26,844	88.1	−0.8
Two-party-preferred result
Labor	Peta-Kaye Croft	13,898	55.2	+1.1
Liberal	John Caris	11,277	44.8	+44.8
Labor hold		Swing	+1.1	

=== Bulimba ===
2006 Queensland state election: Bulimba
Party	Candidate	Votes	%	±%
Labor	Pat Purcell	13,666	57.6	−3.2
Liberal	Angela Julian-Armitage	7,043	29.7	+1.6
Greens	Howard Nielsen	2,685	11.3	+0.1
Independent	David Boehm	344	1.4	+1.4
Total formal votes		23,738	98.1	+0.1
Informal votes		449	1.9	−0.1
Turnout		24,187	89.2	−1.0
Two-party-preferred result
Labor	Pat Purcell	14,896	66.2	−2.3
Liberal	Angela Julian-Armitage	7,593	33.8	+2.3
Labor hold		Swing	−2.3	

=== Bundaberg ===
2006 Queensland state election: Bundaberg
Party	Candidate	Votes	%	±%
Labor	Sonja Cleary	11,437	44.7	−6.5
National	Jack Dempsey	11,400	44.6	+3.9
Independent	Gregory McMahon	1,731	6.8	+6.8
Greens	Willy Bach	1,002	3.9	−0.7
Total formal votes		25,570	97.8	−0.1
Informal votes		568	2.2	+0.1
Turnout		26,138	92.4	−0.4
Two-party-preferred result
National	Jack Dempsey	12,439	51.0	+6.3
Labor	Sonja Cleary	11,973	49.0	−6.3
National gain from Labor		Swing	+6.3	

=== Bundamba ===
2006 Queensland state election: Bundamba
Party	Candidate	Votes	%	±%
Labor	Jo-Ann Miller	17,101	68.5	+5.3
Liberal	Paul Cole	5,503	22.0	+3.1
Greens	James Prentice	1,955	7.8	+0.9
Independent	Alf Viskers	418	1.7	+1.7
Total formal votes		24,977	97.0	−0.5
Informal votes		768	3.0	+0.5
Turnout		25,745	91.1	−1.0
Two-party-preferred result
Labor	Jo-Ann Miller	17,781	74.8	−0.1
Liberal	Paul Cole	5,998	25.2	+0.1
Labor hold		Swing	−0.1	

=== Burdekin ===
2006 Queensland state election: Burdekin
Party	Candidate	Votes	%	±%
National	Rosemary Menkens	10,104	48.1	+12.7
Labor	Steve Rodgers	9,169	43.7	+6.8
Greens	Anja Light	863	4.1	+0.5
Family First	Amanda Nickson	852	4.1	+4.1
Total formal votes		20,988	97.9	−0.2
Informal votes		441	2.1	+0.2
Turnout		21,429	91.6	−0.4
Two-party-preferred result
National	Rosemary Menkens	10,589	52.4	−2.0
Labor	Steve Rodgers	9,619	47.6	+2.0
National hold		Swing	−2.0	

=== Burleigh ===
2006 Queensland state election: Burleigh
Party	Candidate	Votes	%	±%
Labor	Christine Smith	14,651	52.5	+5.2
Liberal	Michael Hart	10,537	37.7	+37.7
Greens	Mike Beale	2,743	9.8	+1.2
Total formal votes		27,931	97.7	−0.2
Informal votes		642	2.3	+0.2
Turnout		28,573	87.7	−1.7
Two-party-preferred result
Labor	Christine Smith	15,501	58.3	+3.3
Liberal	Michael Hart	11,072	41.7	−3.3
Labor hold		Swing	+3.3	

=== Burnett ===
2006 Queensland state election: Burnett
Party	Candidate	Votes	%	±%
National	Rob Messenger	14,469	57.6	+5.0
Labor	Denise Williams	10,663	42.4	−5.0
Total formal votes		25,132	97.3	−0.1
Informal votes		692	2.7	+0.1
Turnout		25,824	92.3	−0.7
National hold		Swing	+5.0	

=== Cairns ===
2006 Queensland state election: Cairns
Party	Candidate	Votes	%	±%
Labor	Desley Boyle	10,598	49.2	+3.5
Liberal	Wendy Richardson	7,260	33.7	−5.1
Fishing Party	Michael Mansfield	1,753	8.1	+8.1
Greens	Steven Nowakowski	1,747	8.1	+0.4
Independent	Peter Sandercock	180	0.8	+0.8
Total formal votes		21,538	97.4	−0.5
Informal votes		567	2.6	+0.5
Turnout		22,105	85.9	−1.0
Two-party-preferred result
Labor	Desley Boyle	11,724	58.1	+4.2
Liberal	Wendy Richardson	8,465	41.9	−4.2
Labor hold		Swing	+4.2	

=== Callide ===
2006 Queensland state election: Callide
Party	Candidate	Votes	%	±%
National	Jeff Seeney	17,022	72.3	+11.9
Labor	Mikey Oliver	6,527	27.7	+5.9
Total formal votes		23,549	97.5	−0.8
Informal votes		597	2.5	+0.8
Turnout		24,146	92.0	−1.6
National hold		Swing	−1.3	

=== Caloundra ===
2006 Queensland state election: Caloundra
Party	Candidate	Votes	%	±%
Liberal	Mark McArdle	13,638	49.3	+6.0
Labor	Tony Moor	11,133	40.3	−1.2
Greens	Dave Norris	2,875	10.4	+2.9
Total formal votes		27,646	98.1	−0.2
Informal votes		528	1.9	+0.2
Turnout		28,174	91.2	−0.8
Two-party-preferred result
Liberal	Mark McArdle	14,280	54.4	+3.1
Labor	Tony Moor	11,947	45.6	−3.1
Liberal hold		Swing	+3.1	

=== Capalaba ===
2006 Queensland state election: Capalaba
Party	Candidate	Votes	%	±%
Labor	Michael Choi	14,447	59.1	−0.1
Liberal	Trish Symons	7,207	29.5	−1.3
Greens	Greg Thomas	2,775	11.4	+1.4
Total formal votes		24,429	97.6	+0.2
Informal votes		600	2.4	−0.2
Turnout		25,029	92.5	−1.1
Two-party-preferred result
Labor	Michael Choi	15,299	66.2	+1.0
Liberal	Trish Symons	7,821	33.8	−1.0
Labor hold		Swing	+1.0	

=== Charters Towers ===
2006 Queensland state election: Charters Towers
Party	Candidate	Votes	%	±%
National	Shane Knuth	10,136	61.05	+14.28
Labor	Bruce Scott	6,468	38.95	−4.62
Total formal votes		16,604	98.58	−0.18
Informal votes		240	1.42	+0.18
Turnout		16,844	90.96	−1.32
National hold		Swing	+8.34	

=== Chatsworth ===
2006 Queensland state election: Chatsworth
Party	Candidate	Votes	%	±%
Liberal	Michael Caltabiano	12,909	46.1	−2.2
Labor	Chris Bombolas	12,742	45.5	+3.0
Greens	Elissa Jenkins	2,349	8.4	+1.2
Total formal votes		28,000	98.3	−0.3
Informal votes		471	1.7	+0.3
Turnout		28,471	93.4	+6.9
Two-party-preferred result
Labor	Chris Bombolas	13,807	50.8	+3.3
Liberal	Michael Caltabiano	13,382	49.2	−3.3
Labor gain from Liberal		Swing	+3.3	

=== Clayfield ===
2006 Queensland state election: Clayfield
Party	Candidate	Votes	%	±%
Liberal	Tim Nicholls	10,847	46.2	+1.1
Labor	Liddy Clark	9,335	39.7	−5.5
Greens	Justin Wells	2,419	10.3	+2.7
Independent	Brad Gradwell	720	3.1	+3.1
Independent	Erik Eriksen	171	0.7	+0.7
Total formal votes		23,492	98.5	+0.0
Informal votes		357	1.5	−0.0
Turnout		25,814	89.1	−1.2
Two-party-preferred result
Liberal	Tim Nicholls	11,553	51.7	+2.9
Labor	Liddy Clark	10,806	48.3	−2.9
Liberal gain from Labor		Swing	+2.9	

=== Cleveland ===
2006 Queensland state election: Cleveland
Party	Candidate	Votes	%	±%
Labor	Phil Weightman	10,754	42.4	−11.5
Liberal	Andrew Trim	10,545	41.6	+3.2
Greens	Robyn Thomas	2,218	8.8	+1.1
Fishing Party	Shane Boese	1,830	7.2	+7.2
Total formal votes		25,347	98.2	+0.3
Informal votes		467	1.8	−0.3
Turnout		25,814	91.7	−0.4
Two-party-preferred result
Labor	Phil Weightman	11,846	50.5	−8.2
Liberal	Andrew Trim	11,593	49.5	+8.2
Labor hold		Swing	−8.2	

=== Cook ===
2006 Queensland state election: Cook
Party	Candidate	Votes	%	±%
Labor	Jason O'Brien	9,806	57.8	+15.8
National	Peter Scott	5,400	31.8	+0.8
Greens	Neville St John-Wood	1,767	10.4	+3.7
Total formal votes		16,973	98.1	−0.2
Informal votes		334	1.9	+0.2
Turnout		17,307	82.4	−1.9
Two-party-preferred result
Labor	Jason O'Brien	10,661	65.1	+7.6
National	Peter Scott	5,709	34.9	−7.6
Labor hold		Swing	+7.6	

=== Cunningham ===
2006 Queensland state election: Cunningham
Party	Candidate	Votes	%	±%
National	Stuart Copeland	14,189	57.06	−5.28
Labor	Nick Holliday	7,027	28.26	−0.11
Family First	Peter Findlay	2,351	9.45	+9.45
Greens	Rian Muller	1,299	5.22	+5.22
Total formal votes		24,866	98.55	+0.12
Informal votes		367	1.45	−0.12
Turnout		25,233	92.15	−0.59
Two-party-preferred result
National	Stuart Copeland	15,500	66.43	−2.50
Labor	Nick Holliday	7,833	33.57	+2.50
National hold		Swing	−2.50	

=== Currumbin ===
2006 Queensland state election: Currumbin
Party	Candidate	Votes	%	±%
Liberal	Jann Stuckey	12,480	47.9	+1.9
Labor	Michael Riordan	11,139	42.7	+3.1
Greens	Inge Light	2,461	9.4	+0.4
Total formal votes		26,080	98.0	−0.0
Informal votes		531	2.0	+0.0
Turnout		26,611	88.6	−1.8
Two-party-preferred result
Liberal	Jann Stuckey	13,058	52.2	−1.0
Labor	Michael Riordan	11,949	47.8	+1.0
Liberal hold		Swing	−1.0	

=== Darling Downs ===
2006 Queensland state election: Darling Downs
Party	Candidate	Votes	%	±%
National	Ray Hopper	13,883	59.54	+9.02
Labor	David Nelson	6,161	26.42	+3.02
Family First	David Totenhofer	3,273	14.04	+14.04
Total formal votes		23,317	97.94	−0.32
Informal votes		490	2.06	+0.32
Turnout		23,807	93.08	−1.10
Two-party-preferred result
National	Ray Hopper	15,218	69.14	+1.37
Labor	David Nelson	6,794	30.86	−1.37
National hold		Swing	+1.37	

=== Everton ===
2006 Queensland state election: Everton
Party	Candidate	Votes	%	±%
Labor	Rod Welford	13,382	52.0	−4.6
Liberal	Ken King	8,511	33.1	−1.9
Greens	Bruce Hallett	2,015	7.8	+1.5
Family First	Dale Shuttleworth	1,823	7.1	+7.1
Total formal votes		25,731	98.4	+0.1
Informal votes		415	1.6	−0.1
Turnout		26,146	92.2	−1.4
Two-party-preferred result
Labor	Rod Welford	14,413	60.1	−1.5
Liberal	Ken King	9,549	39.9	+1.5
Labor hold		Swing	−1.5	

=== Ferny Grove ===
2006 Queensland state election: Ferny Grove
Party	Candidate	Votes	%	±%
Labor	Geoff Wilson	14,378	51.4	−4.2
Liberal	James Petterson	8,347	29.9	−3.1
Greens	Di Clark	3,236	11.6	+0.3
Family First	Mark White	1,991	7.1	+7.1
Total formal votes		27,952	98.4	−0.0
Informal votes		456	1.6	+0.0
Turnout		28,408	92.5	−0.6
Two-party-preferred result
Labor	Geoff Wilson	16,256	62.1	−1.1
Liberal	James Petterson	9,932	37.9	+1.1
Labor hold		Swing	−1.1	

=== Fitzroy ===
2006 Queensland state election: Fitzroy
Party	Candidate	Votes	%	±%
Labor	Jim Pearce	13,617	63.94	+1.59
National	John Engwicht	6,639	31.17	−6.48
Independent	David Foster	1,041	4.89	+4.89
Total formal votes		21,297	98.39	+0.32
Informal votes		348	1.61	−0.32
Turnout		21,645	91.67	−1.00
Two-party-preferred result
Labor	Jim Pearce	13,817	66.40	+4.05
National	John Engwicht	6,992	33.60	−4.05
Labor hold		Swing	+4.05	

=== Gaven ===
2006 Queensland state election: Gaven
Party	Candidate	Votes	%	±%
Labor	Phil Gray	13,715	48.2	+0.9
National	Alex Douglas	12,223	42.9	+42.9
Greens	Glen Ryman	2,545	8.9	+0.7
Total formal votes		28,483	96.8	−0.3
Informal votes		941	3.2	+0.3
Turnout		29,424	90.8	+0.1
Two-party-preferred result
Labor	Phil Gray	14,308	53.1	−1.9
National	Alex Douglas	12,642	46.9	+1.9
Labor hold		Swing	−1.9	

=== Gladstone ===
2006 Queensland state election: Gladstone
Party	Candidate	Votes	%	±%
Independent	Liz Cunningham	12,215	47.4	−7.9
Labor	Chris Trevor	11,956	46.4	+9.1
National	John Todd	1,596	6.2	−1.2
Total formal votes		25,767	98.9	+0.6
Informal votes		293	1.1	−0.6
Turnout		26,060	92.4	−1.2
Two-candidate-preferred result
Independent	Liz Cunningham	13,112	52.0	−9.2
Labor	Chris Trevor	12,108	48.0	+9.2
Independent hold		Swing	−9.2	

=== Glass House ===
2006 Queensland state election: Glass House
Party	Candidate	Votes	%	±%
Labor	Carolyn Male	13,418	48.4	−0.4
National	Ken Piva	9,834	35.4	+2.0
Greens	Roger Callen	2,966	10.7	+2.3
Family First	Justin Blowes	1,524	5.5	+5.5
Total formal votes		27,742	97.7	−0.3
Informal votes		657	2.3	+0.3
Turnout		28,399	91.5	−0.9
Two-party-preferred result
Labor	Carolyn Male	14,830	57.7	−1.2
National	Ken Piva	10,880	42.3	+1.2
Labor hold		Swing	−1.2	

=== Greenslopes ===
2006 Queensland state election: Greenslopes
Party	Candidate	Votes	%	±%
Labor	Gary Fenlon	12,349	50.2	−2.5
Liberal	Melina Morgan	8,487	34.5	+0.3
Greens	Darryl Rosin	3,108	12.6	+3.0
Independent	Warren Simondson	670	2.7	−0.8
Total formal votes		24,614	98.4	−0.0
Informal votes		407	1.6	+0.0
Turnout		25,021	90.4	−1.1
Two-party-preferred result
Labor	Gary Fenlon	13,601	60.1	−0.9
Liberal	Melina Morgan	9,027	39.9	+0.9
Labor hold		Swing	−0.9	

=== Gregory ===
2006 Queensland state election: Gregory
Party	Candidate	Votes	%	±%
National	Vaughan Johnson	10,105	60.0	−2.0
Labor	Shane Guley	4,691	27.9	−2.3
Family First	Ross Grierson	1,102	6.5	+6.5
Independent	Julie-Anne Evans	930	5.5	+5.5
Total formal votes		16,828	98.6	+0.2
Informal votes		245	1.4	−0.2
Turnout		17,073	91.0	−0.8
Two-party-preferred result
National	Vaughan Johnson	10,767	68.0	+0.6
Labor	Shane Guley	5,076	32.0	−0.6
National hold		Swing	+0.6	

=== Gympie ===
2006 Queensland state election: Gympie
Party	Candidate	Votes	%	±%
National	David Gibson	13,054	46.0	+21.1
Independent	Rae Gate	3,857	13.6	+13.6
Labor	Jon Persley	3,508	12.4	−13.3
Greens	Paul Marshall	2,598	9.2	+5.3
Independent	Elisa Roberts	2,393	8.4	−25.0
Family First	Beryl Spencer	2,317	8.2	+8.2
One Nation	Greg Houghton	647	2.3	−3.3
Total formal votes		28,374	98.1	−0.4
Informal votes		543	1.9	+0.4
Turnout		28,917	92.3	−0.5
Two-candidate-preferred result
National	David Gibson	15,469	68.2	+68.2
Independent	Rae Gate	7,199	31.8	+31.8
National gain from Independent		Swing	N/A	

=== Hervey Bay ===
2006 Queensland state election: Hervey Bay
Party	Candidate	Votes	%	±%
Labor	Andrew McNamara	11,438	41.4	−3.7
National	Jan Rohozinski	10,198	36.9	+1.0
Family First	Elizabeth Benson-Stott	2,472	8.9	+8.9
Greens	Matt Stevenson	1,913	6.9	+1.3
Independent	Peter Schuback	1,607	5.8	+5.8
Total formal votes		27,628	97.5	−0.6
Informal votes		720	2.5	+0.6
Turnout		28,348	92.3	−0.6
Two-party-preferred result
Labor	Andrew McNamara	12,669	51.8	−2.2
National	Jan Rohozinski	11,794	48.2	+2.2
Labor hold		Swing	−2.2	

=== Hinchinbrook ===
2006 Queensland state election: Hinchinbrook
Party	Candidate	Votes	%	±%
National	Andrew Cripps	10,146	50.4	+8.6
Labor	Steve Kilburn	8,678	43.1	+18.9
Greens	Fay McKenzie	1,293	6.4	+6.4
Total formal votes		20,117	97.5	−0.7
Informal votes		509	2.5	+0.7
Turnout		20,626	91.3	−1.5
Two-party-preferred result
National	Andrew Cripps	10,465	53.7	−7.2
Labor	Steve Kilburn	9,026	46.3	+46.3
National hold		Swing	−7.2	

=== Inala ===
2006 Queensland state election: Inala
Party	Candidate	Votes	%	±%
Labor	Annastacia Palaszczuk	15,417	69.1	+0.9
Liberal	Peter Matic	4,558	20.4	+7.1
Greens	Bob East	2,327	10.4	+4.5
Total formal votes		22,302	97.5	+0.2
Informal votes		568	2.5	−0.2
Turnout		22,870	91.3	+0.2
Two-party-preferred result
Labor	Annastacia Palaszczuk	16,223	76.3	−4.7
Liberal	Peter Matic	5,028	23.7	+4.7
Labor hold		Swing	−4.7	

=== Indooroopilly ===
2006 Queensland state election: Indooroopilly
Party	Candidate	Votes	%	±%
Liberal	Peter Turner	9,868	42.4	−0.6
Labor	Ronan Lee	9,410	40.5	−0.4
Greens	Judy Petroeschevsky	3,979	17.1	+2.6
Total formal votes		23,257	98.7	−0.2
Informal votes		314	1.3	+0.2
Turnout		23,571	89.3	−0.2
Two-party-preferred result
Labor	Ronan Lee	11,684	52.4	+0.3
Liberal	Peter Turner	10,601	47.6	−0.3
Labor hold		Swing	+0.3	

=== Ipswich ===
2006 Queensland state election: Ipswich
Party	Candidate	Votes	%	±%
Labor	Rachel Nolan	16,033	66.2	+2.0
Liberal	Simon Pointer	6,223	25.7	+0.3
Greens	Rob Speirs	1,969	8.1	+1.6
Total formal votes		24,225	97.9	+0.0
Informal votes		518	2.1	−0.0
Turnout		24,743	92.5	−0.8
Two-party-preferred result
Labor	Rachel Nolan	16,653	71.6	+0.6
Liberal	Simon Pointer	6,600	28.4	−0.6
Labor hold		Swing	+0.6	

=== Ipswich West ===
2006 Queensland state election: Ipswich West
Party	Candidate	Votes	%	±%
Labor	Wayne Wendt	13,073	54.5	+5.5
Liberal	Sean Choat	7,410	30.9	−0.6
Greens	Bill Livermore	1,694	7.1	+2.4
Family First	Barbara Brown	1,379	5.7	+5.7
Independent	Brian Branch	440	1.8	+1.8
Total formal votes		23,996	97.5	−0.5
Informal votes		610	2.5	+0.5
Turnout		24,606	92.4	−0.8
Two-party-preferred result
Labor	Wayne Wendt	14,005	63.1	+3.7
Liberal	Sean Choat	8,185	36.9	−3.7
Labor hold		Swing	+3.7	

=== Kallangur ===
2006 Queensland state election: Kallangur
Party	Candidate	Votes	%	±%
Labor	Ken Hayward	14,509	53.8	+1.9
National	Fiona Brydon	9,203	34.1	+7.6
Greens	Rachel Doherty	3,266	12.1	+3.5
Total formal votes		26,978	97.2	−0.3
Informal votes		772	2.8	+0.3
Turnout		27,750	92.3	−0.5
Two-party-preferred result
Labor	Ken Hayward	15,269	60.3	−3.4
National	Fiona Brydon	10,042	39.7	+3.4
Labor hold		Swing	−3.4	

=== Kawana ===
2006 Queensland state election: Kawana
Party	Candidate	Votes	%	±%
Liberal	Steve Dickson	15,184	49.9	+7.9
Labor	Chris Cummins	11,755	38.6	−5.7
Greens	Lindsay Holt	3,485	11.5	+5.1
Total formal votes		30,424	98.0	−0.3
Informal votes		633	2.0	+0.3
Turnout		31,057	90.5	−1.4
Two-party-preferred result
Liberal	Steve Dickson	16,061	55.7	+7.2
Labor	Chris Cummins	12,785	44.3	−7.2
Liberal gain from Labor		Swing	+7.2	

=== Keppel ===
2006 Queensland state election: Keppel
Party	Candidate	Votes	%	±%
Labor	Paul Hoolihan	12,305	50.1	+3.6
National	Mary Carroll	8,905	36.3	−2.1
Family First	Scott Kilpatrick	2,111	8.6	+8.6
Greens	John McKeon	764	3.1	+3.1
Independent	Peter Draper	243	1.0	+1.0
Independent	Judy Canales	123	0.5	+0.5
Independent	Valle Checa	96	0.4	+0.4
Total formal votes		24,547	98.2	+0.1
Informal votes		441	1.8	−0.1
Turnout		24,988	92.4	+0.3
Two-party-preferred result
Labor	Paul Hoolihan	13,088	57.2	+3.4
National	Mary Carroll	9,797	42.8	−3.4
Labor hold		Swing	+3.4	

=== Kurwongbah ===
2006 Queensland state election: Kurwongbah
Party	Candidate	Votes	%	±%
Labor	Linda Lavarch	17,699	56.48	+1.93
National	Terry Orreal	10,686	34.10	+2.60
Greens	Terry Jones	2,949	9.41	+1.83
Total formal votes		31,334	98.03	−0.13
Informal votes		630	1.97	+0.13
Turnout		31,964	92.99	−0.62
Two-party-preferred result
Labor	Linda Lavarch	18,791	62.36	−0.09
National	Terry Orreal	11,341	37.64	+0.09
Labor hold		Swing	−0.09	

=== Lockyer ===
2006 Queensland state election: Lockyer
Party	Candidate	Votes	%	±%
National	Ian Rickuss	11,821	44.4	+9.6
Labor	John Kelly	11,037	41.5	+9.8
Family First	Helen Muller	2,138	8.0	+8.0
Greens	Luc Muller	1,620	6.1	+1.6
Total formal votes		26,616	97.8	−0.0
Informal votes		564	2.2	+0.0
Turnout		27,222	92.7	−0.4
Two-party-preferred result
National	Ian Rickuss	12,855	51.7	−2.4
Labor	John Kelly	11,989	48.3	+2.4
National hold		Swing	−2.4	

=== Logan ===
2006 Queensland state election: Logan
Party	Candidate	Votes	%	±%
Labor	John Mickel	15,456	63.9	+0.1
National	Belinda Goodwin	5,054	20.9	−3.6
Greens	Jessica Brown	2,174	9.0	+0.2
Family First	Robert Prinzen-Wood	1,521	6.3	+6.3
Total formal votes		24,205	96.9	−0.0
Informal votes		771	3.1	+0.0
Turnout		24,976	90.8	−0.8
Two-party-preferred result
Labor	John Mickel	16,508	73.9	+2.7
National	Belinda Goodwin	5,829	26.1	−2.7
Labor hold		Swing	+2.7	

=== Lytton ===
2006 Queensland state election: Lytton
Party	Candidate	Votes	%	±%
Labor	Paul Lucas	14,398	59.3	−2.5
Liberal	Amanda Wiklund	6,892	28.4	−0.6
Greens	David Wyatt	2,992	12.3	+3.1
Total formal votes		24,282	97.9	+0.0
Informal votes		514	2.1	−0.0
Turnout		24,796	92.0	−1.2
Two-party-preferred result
Labor	Paul Lucas	15,390	66.8	−1.1
Liberal	Amanda Wiklund	7,633	33.2	+1.1
Labor hold		Swing	−1.1	

=== Mackay ===
2006 Queensland state election: Mackay
Party	Candidate	Votes	%	±%
Labor	Tim Mulherin	15,208	61.9	+6.0
National	Craig Joy	6,990	28.4	+1.7
Greens	Michele Graham	1,532	6.2	−1.0
Independent	Archie Julien	850	3.5	+3.5
Total formal votes		24,580	97.3	−0.7
Informal votes		677	2.7	+0.7
Turnout		25,257	90.2	−1.1
Two-party-preferred result
Labor	Tim Mulherin	15,707	67.6	+1.8
National	Craig Joy	7,520	32.4	−1.8
Labor hold		Swing	+1.8	

=== Mansfield ===
2006 Queensland state election: Mansfield
Party	Candidate	Votes	%	±%
Labor	Phil Reeves	12,581	50.3	−3.6
Liberal	Glen Ryan	8,980	35.9	−2.6
Greens	Gary McMahon	1,883	7.5	−0.1
Family First	Geoff Grounds	1,576	6.3	+6.3
Total formal votes		25,020	98.2	+0.1
Informal votes		466	1.8	−0.1
Turnout		25,486	91.6	−1.3
Two-party-preferred result
Labor	Phil Reeves	13,645	57.7	−0.9
Liberal	Glen Ryan	9,992	42.3	+0.9
Labor hold		Swing	−0.9	

=== Maroochydore ===
2006 Queensland state election: Maroochydore
Party	Candidate	Votes	%	±%
National	Fiona Simpson	14,161	54.3	+8.3
Labor	Debbie Blumel	8,747	33.5	−4.3
Greens	K C Robinson	2,604	10.0	+2.1
Independent	Max Phillips	579	2.2	+2.2
Total formal votes		26,091	98.2	−0.1
Informal votes		489	1.8	+0.1
Turnout		26,580	88.2	−1.1
Two-party-preferred result
National	Fiona Simpson	15,066	60.7	+6.6
Labor	Debbie Blumel	9,764	39.3	−6.6
National hold		Swing	+6.6	

=== Maryborough ===
2006 Queensland state election: Maryborough
Party	Candidate	Votes	%	±%
Independent	Chris Foley	17,888	69.6	+4.7
Labor	Peter Allen	3,839	14.9	−15.2
National	Damien Tessmann	2,580	10.0	+10.0
Greens	Steve Walker	1,387	5.4	+0.3
Total formal votes		25,894	98.1	+0.3
Informal votes		502	1.9	−0.3
Turnout		26,196	92.8	−1.4
Two-candidate-preferred result
Independent	Chris Foley	20,044	82.7	+14.7
Labor	Peter Allen	4,184	17.3	−14.7
Independent hold		Swing	+14.7	

=== Mirani ===
2006 Queensland state election: Mirani
Party	Candidate	Votes	%	±%
National	Ted Malone	12,399	52.2	+0.9
Labor	Deb Green	9,517	40.0	+5.2
Independent	Rob Robinson	1,847	7.8	+7.8
Total formal votes		23,763	98.2	−0.1
Informal votes		437	1.8	+0.1
Turnout		24,200	92.4	−0.7
Two-party-preferred result
National	Ted Malone	13,001	56.5	−4.1
Labor	Deb Green	10,020	43.5	+4.1
National hold		Swing	−4.1	

=== Moggill ===
2006 Queensland state election: Moggill
Party	Candidate	Votes	%	±%
Liberal	Bruce Flegg	13,237	50.7	−1.4
Labor	Lisa Rayner	8,362	32.0	−3.6
Greens	Geoff Munck	4,510	17.3	+5.0
Total formal votes		26,109	98.6	−0.2
Informal votes		364	1.4	+0.2
Turnout		26,473	91.5	−1.1
Two-party-preferred result
Liberal	Bruce Flegg	14,299	57.9	+1.6
Labor	Lisa Rayner	10,376	42.1	−1.6
Liberal hold		Swing	+1.6	

=== Mount Coot-tha ===
2006 Queensland state election: Mount Coot-tha
Party	Candidate	Votes	%	±%
Labor	Andrew Fraser	10,691	45.0	+0.8
Liberal	James Mackay	7,903	33.3	+3.2
Greens	Juanita Wheeler	5,163	21.7	−1.9
Total formal votes		23,757	98.6	−0.1
Informal votes		345	1.4	+0.1
Turnout		24,102	86.5	+0.0
Two-party-preferred result
Labor	Andrew Fraser	13,313	60.5	−1.0
Liberal	James Mackay	8,709	39.5	+1.0
Labor hold		Swing	−1.0	

=== Mount Gravatt ===
2006 Queensland state election: Mount Gravatt
Party	Candidate	Votes	%	±%
Labor	Judy Spence	12,742	54.82	−1.63
Liberal	Nick Monsour	7,517	32.34	−3.34
Greens	Daniel Crute	1,710	7.36	+7.36
Family First	Matthew Darragh	956	4.11	+4.11
Independent	J.F. Barnes	319	1.37	−2.41
Total formal votes		23,244	98.13	+0.23
Informal votes		443	1.87	−0.23
Turnout		23,687	89.64	−1.90
Two-party-preferred result
Labor	Judy Spence	13,852	62.88	+2.56
Liberal	Nick Monsour	8,179	37.12	−2.56
Labor hold		Swing	+2.56	

=== Mount Isa ===
2006 Queensland state election: Mount Isa
Party	Candidate	Votes	%	±%
Labor	Betty Kiernan	7,705	56.5	−5.3
National	Roy Collins	4,384	32.2	−1.5
Family First	Merlin Manners	1,544	11.3	+11.3
Total formal votes		13,633	98.0	−0.1
Informal votes		272	2.0	+0.1
Turnout		13,905	84.6	−2.1
Two-party-preferred result
Labor	Betty Kiernan	8,156	62.3	−1.9
National	Roy Collins	4,939	37.7	+1.9
Labor hold		Swing	−1.9	

=== Mount Ommaney ===
2006 Queensland state election: Mount Ommaney
Party	Candidate	Votes	%	±%
Labor	Julie Attwood	12,887	52.4	−3.0
Liberal	Bob Harper	8,950	36.4	+0.8
Greens	Jos Hall	2,742	11.2	+3.9
Total formal votes		24,579	98.3	−0.4
Informal votes		433	1.7	+0.4
Turnout		25,012	90.0	−2.7
Two-party-preferred result
Labor	Julie Attwood	14,384	60.2	−1.4
Liberal	Bob Harper	9,508	39.8	+1.4
Labor hold		Swing	−1.4	

=== Mudgeeraba ===
2006 Queensland state election: Mudgeeraba
Party	Candidate	Votes	%	±%
Labor	Dianne Reilly	11,724	45.1	+0.6
Liberal	Ros Bates	10,663	41.0	−1.1
Greens	Gary Pead	1,890	7.3	−0.3
Family First	James Tayler	1,728	6.6	+6.6
Total formal votes		26,005	97.5	−0.2
Informal votes		664	2.5	+0.2
Turnout		26,669	89.2	−0.2
Two-party-preferred result
Labor	Dianne Reilly	12,941	52.9	+1.0
Liberal	Ros Bates	11,506	47.1	−1.0
Labor hold		Swing	+1.0	

=== Mulgrave ===
2006 Queensland state election: Mulgrave
Party	Candidate	Votes	%	±%
Labor	Warren Pitt	14,081	59.9	+8.5
National	Krista Dunford	9,418	40.1	+5.5
Total formal votes		23,499	97.6	−0.4
Informal votes		582	2.4	+0.4
Turnout		24,081	89.6	−2.0
Labor hold		Swing	+2.2	

=== Mundingburra ===
2006 Queensland state election: Mundingburra
Party	Candidate	Votes	%	±%
Labor	Lindy Nelson-Carr	13,321	54.7	+8.9
Liberal	Mick Reilly	8,711	35.7	+3.1
Greens	Jenny Stirling	2,343	9.6	+1.5
Total formal votes		24,375	97.7	−0.2
Informal votes		582	2.3	+0.2
Turnout		24,957	89.2	−1.2
Two-party-preferred result
Labor	Lindy Nelson-Carr	14,109	60.5	+4.3
Liberal	Mick Reilly	8,711	35.7	+3.1
Labor hold		Swing	+4.3	

=== Murrumba ===
2006 Queensland state election: Murrumba
Party	Candidate	Votes	%	±%
Labor	Dean Wells	16,646	53.9	−3.3
Liberal	Reg Gulley	10,075	32.6	−0.6
Independent	Terry Shaw	2,307	7.5	+7.5
Greens	Michael Jeffrey	1,833	5.9	−3.7
Total formal votes		30,861	97.6	+0.1
Informal votes		750	2.4	−0.1
Turnout		31,611	91.4	−1.7
Two-party-preferred result
Labor	Dean Wells	17,811	61.6	−1.1
Liberal	Reg Gulley	11,114	38.4	+1.1
Labor hold		Swing	−1.1	

=== Nanango ===
2006 Queensland state election: Nanango
Party	Candidate	Votes	%	±%
Independent	Dorothy Pratt	9,721	43.5	−2.2
National	John Bjelke-Petersen	8,895	39.8	+12.3
Labor	Mark Whittaker	3,238	14.5	−2.3
Family First	Trevor Dent	513	2.3	+2.3
Total formal votes		22,367	98.4	+0.1
Informal votes		355	1.6	−0.1
Turnout		22,722	92.1	−1.0
Two-candidate-preferred result
Independent	Dorothy Pratt	11,051	54.2	−8.5
National	John Bjelke-Petersen	9,323	45.8	+8.5
Independent hold		Swing	−8.5	

=== Nicklin ===
2006 Queensland state election: Nicklin
Party	Candidate	Votes	%	±%
Independent	Peter Wellington	16,067	59.7	+0.2
National	Steve Morrison	5,585	20.7	+6.4
Labor	Matt Rocks	3,429	12.7	−3.0
Greens	Katherine Webb	1,836	6.8	+1.6
Total formal votes		26,917	98.5	−0.1
Informal votes		415	1.5	+0.1
Turnout		27,332	90.5	−1.1
Two-candidate-preferred result
Independent	Peter Wellington	18,097	75.1	−4.5
National	Steve Morrison	6,007	24.9	+24.9
Independent hold		Swing	−4.5	

=== Noosa ===
2006 Queensland state election: Noosa
Party	Candidate	Votes	%	±%
Liberal	Glen Elmes	11,122	38.2	+3.0
Labor	John O'Connor	6,922	23.8	−24.6
Independent	Cate Molloy	6,819	23.4	+23.4
Greens	Jennie Harvie	2,771	9.5	−0.7
Family First	John Chapman	1,191	4.1	+4.1
Independent	John Rivett	262	0.9	+0.9
Total formal votes		29,087	98.2	−0.3
Informal votes		537	1.8	+0.3
Turnout		29,624	89.1	−1.3
Two-candidate-preferred result
Liberal	Glen Elmes	12,324	56.3	+15.0
Independent	Cate Molloy	9,557	43.7	+43.7
Liberal gain from Independent		Swing	+15.0	

=== Nudgee ===
2006 Queensland state election: Nudgee
Party	Candidate	Votes	%	±%
Labor	Neil Roberts	14,851	61.6	−1.8
Liberal	Max Swanson	6,754	28.0	+0.3
Greens	Noel Clothier	2,497	10.4	+1.5
Total formal votes		24,102	98.0	−0.1
Informal votes		494	2.0	+0.1
Turnout		24,596	91.5	−0.7
Two-party-preferred result
Labor	Neil Roberts	15,744	68.3	−1.0
Liberal	Max Swanson	7,294	31.7	+1.0
Labor hold		Swing	−1.0	

=== Pumicestone ===
2006 Queensland state election: Pumicestone
Party	Candidate	Votes	%	±%
Labor	Carryn Sullivan	13,760	50.3	+2.4
Liberal	Shane Moon	10,975	40.1	+3.3
Greens	Lyn Dickinson	2,603	9.5	+3.8
Total formal votes		27,338	97.6	−0.3
Informal votes		663	2.4	+0.3
Turnout		28,001	92.0	−0.4
Two-party-preferred result
Labor	Carryn Sullivan	14,456	55.4	+0.0
Liberal	Shane Moon	11,630	44.6	-0.0
Labor hold		Swing	+0.0	

=== Redcliffe ===
2006 Queensland state election: Redcliffe
Party	Candidate	Votes	%	±%
Labor	Lillian van Litsenburg	11,794	49.2	−0.9
Liberal	Terry Rogers	9,581	40.0	+4.4
Greens	Pete Johnson	2,589	10.8	+10.8
Total formal votes		23,964	97.8	+0.1
Informal votes		550	2.2	−0.1
Turnout		24,514	92.3	−0.4
Two-party-preferred result
Labor	Lillian van Litsenburg	12,545	55.4	−1.7
Liberal	Terry Rogers	10,080	44.6	+1.7
Labor hold		Swing	−1.7	

=== Redlands ===
2006 Queensland state election: Redlands
Party	Candidate	Votes	%	±%
Labor	John English	13,416	49.7	−3.7
National	Russell Biddle	9,295	34.4	−2.3
Independent	John Hegarty	2,349	8.7	+8.7
Greens	Brad Scott	1,931	7.2	+2.3
Total formal votes		26,991	97.9	−0.3
Informal votes		577	2.1	+0.3
Turnout		27,568	91.1	−2.1
Two-party-preferred result
Labor	John English	14,433	56.9	−1.6
National	Russell Biddle	10,925	43.1	+1.6
Labor hold		Swing	−1.6	

=== Robina ===
2006 Queensland state election: Robina
Party	Candidate	Votes	%	±%
Liberal	Ray Stevens	13,082	48.30	−6.65
Labor	Liz Pommer	11,657	43.04	+5.76
Greens	Lara Pape	2,346	8.66	+0.88
Total formal votes		27,085	97.40	−0.29
Informal votes		724	2.60	+0.29
Turnout		27,809	87.19	−1.28
Two-party-preferred result
Liberal	Ray Stevens	13,582	52.53	−6.25
Labor	Liz Pommer	12,275	47.47	+6.25
Liberal hold		Swing	−6.25	

=== Rockhampton ===
2006 Queensland state election: Rockhampton
Party	Candidate	Votes	%	±%
Labor	Robert Schwarten	15,581	70.5	+1.5
National	Robert Mills	6,512	29.5	−1.5
Total formal votes		22,093	97.6	+0.2
Informal votes		546	2.4	−0.2
Turnout		22,639	91.2	−1.6
Labor hold		Swing	+1.5	

=== Sandgate ===
2006 Queensland state election: Sandgate
Party	Candidate	Votes	%	±%
Labor	Vicky Darling	13,756	55.9	+1.7
Liberal	Alan Boulton	6,937	28.2	−2.0
Greens	Peter Fagan	1,816	7.4	−5.9
Family First	Sally Vincent	1,765	7.2	+7.2
Independent	Ronny Eaton	321	1.3	+0.2
Total formal votes		24,595	97.8	−0.2
Informal votes		563	2.2	+0.2
Turnout		25,158	91.9	−0.9
Two-party-preferred result
Labor	Vicky Darling	14,845	65.2	+1.2
Liberal	Alan Boulton	7,927	34.8	−1.2
Labor hold		Swing	+1.2	

=== South Brisbane ===
2006 Queensland state election: South Brisbane
Party	Candidate	Votes	%	±%
Labor	Anna Bligh	12,636	51.5	−1.6
Liberal	Lynne Jennings	6,212	25.3	+1.2
Greens	Gary Kane	5,269	21.5	+1.5
Independent	Derek Rosborough	405	1.7	+1.7
Total formal votes		24,522	98.2	+0.4
Informal votes		455	1.8	−0.4
Turnout		24,977	85.3	−0.4
Two-party-preferred result
Labor	Anna Bligh	15,296	68.4	−2.7
Liberal	Lynne Jennings	7,071	31.6	+2.7
Labor hold		Swing	−2.7	

=== Southern Downs ===
2006 Queensland state election: Southern Downs
Party	Candidate	Votes	%	±%
National	Lawrence Springborg	17,973	70.3	+0.6
Labor	Andrew Myles	7,602	29.7	+8.1
Total formal votes		25,575	98.1	−0.1
Informal votes		486	1.9	+0.1
Turnout		26,061	92.6	−0.6
National hold		Swing	−4.9	

=== Southport ===
2006 Queensland state election: Southport
Party	Candidate	Votes	%	±%
Labor	Peter Lawlor	13,063	53.3	−0.8
National	Bob Bennett	9,070	37.0	+1.7
Greens	Carla Brandon	2,364	9.7	+3.3
Total formal votes		24,497	97.5	−0.0
Informal votes		624	2.5	+0.0
Turnout		25,121	87.0	−1.6
Two-party-preferred result
Labor	Peter Lawlor	13,764	59.1	−0.9
National	Bob Bennett	9,522	40.9	+0.9
Labor hold		Swing	−0.9	

=== Springwood ===
2006 Queensland state election: Springwood
Party	Candidate	Votes	%	±%
Labor	Barbara Stone	11,845	49.2	−5.7
Liberal	Peter Collins	9,434	39.2	+39.2
Greens	Neil Cotter	1,492	6.2	−2.1
Independent	Lesley Noah	1,315	5.5	+5.5
Total formal votes		24,086	97.9	−0.0
Informal votes		516	2.1	+0.0
Turnout		24,602	90.8	−1.3
Two-party-preferred result
Labor	Barbara Stone	12,711	55.2	−4.5
Liberal	Peter Collins	10,328	44.8	+44.8
Labor hold		Swing	−4.5	

=== Stafford ===
2006 Queensland state election: Stafford
Party	Candidate	Votes	%	±%
Labor	Stirling Hinchliffe	13,288	55.5	−3.6
Liberal	Brad Carswell	7,165	29.9	-0.0
Greens	Sam Clifford	2,588	10.8	−0.2
Independent	Jim Dooley	901	3.8	+3.8
Total formal votes		23,942	98.0	−0.0
Informal votes		484	2.0	+0.0
Turnout		24,426	91.0	−0.6
Two-party-preferred result
Labor	Stirling Hinchliffe	14,564	64.9	−1.4
Liberal	Brad Carswell	7,880	35.1	+1.4
Labor hold		Swing	−1.4	

=== Stretton ===
2006 Queensland state election: Stretton
Party	Candidate	Votes	%	±%
Labor	Stephen Robertson	16,644	58.8	−1.1
Liberal	Scott Furlong	9,154	32.3	+0.1
Greens	Jane Cajdler	2,510	8.9	+0.9
Total formal votes		28,308	98.1	+0.1
Informal votes		550	1.9	−0.1
Turnout		28,858	90.0	−0.7
Two-party-preferred result
Labor	Stephen Robertson	17,434	64.2	−0.8
Liberal	Scott Furlong	9,728	35.8	+0.8
Labor hold		Swing	−0.8	

=== Surfers Paradise ===
2006 Queensland state election: Surfers Paradise
Party	Candidate	Votes	%	±%
Liberal	John-Paul Langbroek	14,483	57.3	+12.6
Labor	Guy Jones	8,563	33.9	+8.4
Greens	Dean Hepburn	2,220	8.8	+1.9
Total formal votes		25,266	97.8	+0.1
Informal votes		560	2.2	−0.1
Turnout		25,826	85.5	−1.1
Two-party-preferred result
Liberal	John-Paul Langbroek	14,926	62.0	−1.9
Labor	Guy Jones	9,157	38.0	+1.9
Liberal hold		Swing	−1.9	

=== Tablelands ===
2006 Queensland state election: Tablelands
Party	Candidate	Votes	%	±%
One Nation	Rosa Lee Long	10,812	50.06	+3.10
Labor	Denis McKinley	4,856	22.48	−4.02
National	George Adil	4,574	21.18	−5.36
Greens	Paul Parker	789	3.65	+3.65
Family First	Troy Howard	567	2.63	+2.63
Total formal votes		21,598	98.20	+0.21
Informal votes		395	1.80	−0.21
Turnout		21,993	90.30	−1.39
Two-candidate-preferred result
One Nation	Rosa Lee Long	12,721	69.77	+7.36
Labor	Denis McKinley	5,512	30.23	+30.23
One Nation hold		Swing	+7.36	

=== Thuringowa ===
2006 Queensland state election: Thuringowa
Party	Candidate	Votes	%	±%
Labor	Craig Wallace	16,613	60.5	+15.7
National	Rod Hardacre	7,815	28.5	+3.0
Greens	Frank Reilly	1,698	6.2	+0.5
One Nation	Bill Hankin	1,311	4.8	−5.0
Total formal votes		27,437	96.9	−0.3
Informal votes		871	3.1	+0.3
Turnout		28,308	90.8	−1.3
Two-party-preferred result
Labor	Craig Wallace	17,255	67.0	+9.1
National	Rod Hardacre	8,493	33.0	−9.1
Labor hold		Swing	+9.1	

=== Toowoomba North ===
2006 Queensland state election: Toowoomba North
Party	Candidate	Votes	%	±%
Labor	Kerry Shine	12,374	53.2	+1.0
National	Lyle Shelton	7,899	34.0	−3.9
Greens	Greg Keane	1,206	5.2	+0.1
Family First	Archie Franz	896	3.9	+3.9
Independent	George Westgarth	890	3.8	+3.8
Total formal votes		23,265	98.5	+0.1
Informal votes		358	1.5	−0.1
Turnout		23,623	92.2	+0.0
Two-party-preferred result
Labor	Kerry Shine	13,262	60.4	+3.1
National	Lyle Shelton	8,690	39.6	−3.1
Labor hold		Swing	+3.1	

=== Toowoomba South ===
2006 Queensland state election: Toowoomba South
Party	Candidate	Votes	%	±%
National	Mike Horan	12,012	50.6	−2.3
Labor	Frank Burke	8,043	33.9	+1.3
Family First	Peter Hicks	1,596	6.7	+6.7
Greens	Christine Tuppurainen	1,482	6.2	−0.8
Independent	Grahame Volker	609	2.6	+2.6
Total formal votes		23,742	98.1	−0.2
Informal votes		448	1.9	+0.2
Turnout		24,190	91.6	−0.7
Two-party-preferred result
National	Mike Horan	13,177	59.8	−1.7
Labor	Frank Burke	8,863	40.2	+1.7
National hold		Swing	−1.7	

=== Townsville ===
2006 Queensland state election: Townsville
Party	Candidate	Votes	%	±%
Labor	Mike Reynolds	11,438	51.8	+9.4
Liberal	Jessica Weber	7,858	35.6	+3.3
Greens	John Boucher	1,511	6.8	−6.2
Independent	Steve Todeschini	1,288	5.8	+5.8
Total formal votes		22,095	97.7	−0.0
Informal votes		526	2.3	+0.0
Turnout		22,621	86.5	−1.8
Two-party-preferred result
Labor	Mike Reynolds	12,255	59.1	+3.8
Liberal	Jessica Weber	8,480	40.9	−3.8
Labor hold		Swing	+3.8	

=== Warrego ===
2006 Queensland state election: Warrego
Party	Candidate	Votes	%	±%
National	Howard Hobbs	12,312	65.5	+7.2
Labor	Marlene Johanson	4,390	23.4	+5.2
Family First	Tony Kusters	1,145	6.1	+6.1
Independent	Ruth Spencer	946	5.0	−5.7
Total formal votes		18,793	98.4	+0.0
Informal votes		306	1.6	−0.0
Turnout		19,099	90.9	−1.8
Two-party-preferred result
National	Howard Hobbs	13,044	73.3	−1.5
Labor	Marlene Johanson	4,741	26.7	+1.5
National hold		Swing	−1.5	

=== Waterford ===
2006 Queensland state election: Waterford
Party	Candidate	Votes	%	±%
Labor	Evan Moorhead	13,624	57.7	+0.4
Liberal	Tracy Elson	6,748	28.6	+1.2
Greens	Stan Cajdler	1,635	6.9	+0.3
Independent	Sue Price	1,594	6.8	+6.8
Total formal votes		23,601	96.8	−0.4
Informal votes		789	3.2	+0.4
Turnout		24,390	88.7	−1.0
Two-party-preferred result
Labor	Evan Moorhead	14,347	65.8	−0.7
Liberal	Tracy Elson	7,441	34.2	+0.7
Labor hold		Swing	−0.7	

=== Whitsunday ===
2006 Queensland state election: Whitsunday
Party	Candidate	Votes	%	±%
Labor	Jan Jarratt	11,872	50.6	−1.0
National	Paul Joice	9,933	42.3	+26.2
Greens	Masha Marjanovich	1,161	4.9	−1.6
Independent	Mike Stone	518	2.2	+2.2
Total formal votes		23,484	98.2	+0.2
Informal votes		429	1.8	−0.2
Turnout		23,913	90.3	−0.2
Two-party-preferred result
Labor	Jan Jarratt	12,289	54.4	−10.4
National	Paul Joice	10,319	45.6	+10.4
Labor hold		Swing	−10.4	

=== Woodridge ===
2006 Queensland state election: Woodridge
Party	Candidate	Votes	%	±%
Labor	Desley Scott	14,257	69.0	−1.3
Liberal	Sarina Patane	3,354	16.2	−2.1
Family First	Jamie Pentsa	1,646	8.0	+8.0
Greens	John Reddington	1,393	6.7	−4.6
Total formal votes		20,650	96.3	−0.2
Informal votes		788	3.7	+0.2
Turnout		21,438	87.5	−1.8
Two-party-preferred result
Labor	Desley Scott	15,080	79.0	+1.1
Liberal	Sarina Patane	4,012	21.0	−1.1
Labor hold		Swing	+1.1	

=== Yeerongpilly ===
2006 Queensland state election: Yeerongpilly
Party	Candidate	Votes	%	±%
Labor	Simon Finn	12,445	51.6	−2.0
Liberal	Marie Jackson	7,340	30.5	+4.7
Greens	Sean McConnell	3,746	15.5	+2.4
Independent	Rod Watson	564	2.3	+2.3
Total formal votes		24,095	98.1	+0.2
Informal votes		473	1.9	−0.2
Turnout		24,568	90.6	−1.2
Two-party-preferred result
Labor	Simon Finn	14,263	63.7	−3.4
Liberal	Marie Jackson	8,112	36.3	+3.4
Labor hold		Swing	−3.4	

== See also ==
- 2006 Queensland state election
- Candidates of the Queensland state election, 2006
- Members of the Queensland Legislative Assembly, 2006-2009
