= 2014 Redcliffe state by-election =

- 22 February 2014
	First party	Second party	Third party
		LNP	IND
Candidate	Yvette D'Ath	Kerri-Anne Dooley	Len Thomas
Party	Labor	Liberal National	Independent
Popular vote	12,437	9,724	2,837
Percentage	44.6%	34.9%	10.2%
Swing	▲13.9	▼14.4	▲10.2
TPP	57.1%	42.9%
TPP swing	▲17.2	▼17.2
MP before election
Scott Driscoll
Independent
Elected MP
Yvette D'Ath
Labor

A by-election for the Queensland Legislative Assembly seat of Redcliffe took place on 22 February 2014. Yvette D'Ath won the seat for Labor.

== Background ==
The Liberal Nationals had won Redcliffe from Labor at the 2012 election with 60 percent of the two-party vote from a 15.7-point two-party swing compared to the statewide two-party swing of 13.7 points.

On 25 March 2013, sitting MP Scott Driscoll was suspended from the Liberal Nationals due to allegations of financial improprieties. He resigned from the party the following month and subsequently sat as an independent.

Driscoll was the subject of complaints of official misconduct referred to the Crime and Misconduct Commission in November 2012, followed by complaints of fraud to the Queensland Police. It was alleged that he secretly controlled the taxpayer-funded Moreton Bay Regional Community Association and had funnelled $2600 in consultancy fees each week to his wife. It was also claimed that he used his electorate office to continue his work with the Queensland Retail Traders and Shopkeepers Association, and that his wife had a contract with the retailers' body worth $350,000 a year. His home was raided by the CMC in May 2013.

The allegations were referred to the Queensland Parliament Ethics Committee in June 2013. On 19 November 2013, Driscoll was found guilty of 42 counts of Contempt of Parliament, four counts of failing to register interests and one count of misleading the House. The Parliament of Queensland Ethics Committee recommended that he be fined $90,000 and that the House vote to expel him from Parliament and declare the seat of Redcliffe vacant. He resigned from Parliament later that day, citing health reasons. However, both major parties had indicated they would support an expulsion motion, making Driscoll's removal from the legislature all but certain.

Premier Campbell Newman announced the 22 February 2014 election date on 13 January 2014. The writ for the election was issued on 28 January 2014. Electoral rolls closed 5pm 3 February 2014, candidate nominations closed midday 13 February 2014 with declaration of candidate nominations and ballot order draw occurring shortly after.

== Nominations ==
The nine candidates in ballot paper order were as follows:

Candidate nominations
Party	Candidate	Background
Independent	Andrew Tyrrell	
Family First Party	Sally Vincent	Contested state seat of Sandgate in 2006, state seat of Murrumba in 2009 and 2012 and federal seat of Petrie in 2010.
Independent	Len Thomas	Former police officer and Moreton Bay Regional Community Association member. Endorsed by United Australia (Palmer) MP Alex Douglas.
Queensland Greens	John Marshall	Contested federal seat of Petrie at the 2013 federal election.
Independent	Gabriel Buckley	Civil libertarian. Ran as an independent Liberal Democratic Party candidate, LDP unregistered for Queensland state elections.
Labor Party	Yvette D'Ath	Federal Labor MP for Petrie 2007–2013.
Independent	Talosaga McMahon	Long-term varied community involvement.
Independent	Liz Woollard	Building Surveyor.
Liberal National Party of Queensland	Kerri-Anne Dooley	Nurse educator. Contested Redcliffe at the 2012 state election as a Family First Party candidate.

Katter's Australian Party, which received 8.7 percent in 2012, did not re-contest Redcliffe at the by-election.

== Polling ==
- On 13–14 December 2013, 774 Redcliffe voters were robocall polled by ReachTEL. Labor's primary vote was at 42 percent with the LNP on 35 percent corresponding to a two-party vote of 54 percent to Labor with the LNP on 46 percent, a 14 percent two-party swing to Labor.
- On 9–12 January 2014, 891 Redcliffe voters were robocall polled by Lonergan Research. Labor's primary vote was at 53 percent, but gave no figures for other parties or candidates, or a two-party vote. Crikey's Poll Bludger indicated the primary votes were Labor 53 percent, LNP 29 percent, Greens 7 percent, with remaining candidates on 10 percent.
- On 14 January 2014, 95 Redcliffe voters were SMS polled by 612 ABC Brisbane radio. Labor's primary vote was at 66 percent with the LNP on 17 percent, Greens 11 percent, with remaining candidates on 6 percent. No two-party vote was provided.
- On 14 February 2014, 500 Redcliffe voters were robocall polled by Galaxy Research. Labor's primary vote was at 48 percent with the LNP on 35 percent corresponding to a two-party vote of 57 percent to Labor with the LNP on 43 percent, a 17 percent two-party swing to Labor.

== Result ==
Redcliffe state by-election, 2014
Party	Candidate	Votes	%	±%
Labor	Yvette D'Ath	12,437	44.6	+13.9
Liberal National	Kerri-Anne Dooley	9,724	34.9	–14.4
Independent Palmer United	Len Thomas	2,837	10.2	+10.2
Greens	John Marshall	1,064	3.8	–2.9
Family First	Sally Vincent	675	2.4	–2.1
Independent	Talosaga McMahon	345	1.2	+1.2
Independent	Liz Woollard	327	1.2	+1.2
Independent Liberal Democrat	Gabriel Buckley	268	1.0	+1.0
Independent	Andrew Tyrrell	205	0.7	+0.7
Total formal votes		27,882	97.7	+0.1
Informal votes		665	2.3	–0.1
Turnout		28,547	86.1	–5.0
Two-party-preferred result
Labor	Yvette D'Ath	14,043	57.1	+17.2
Liberal National	Kerri-Anne Dooley	10,540	42.9	–17.2
Labor gain from Liberal National		Swing	+17.2	

Results are final. The ABC's Antony Green said at 7:20pm on election night that D'Ath had reclaimed the seat for Labor. The by-election proved to be the beginning of the end for the Newman government, which suffered a shock defeat at the 2015 state election.

== See also ==
- List of Queensland state by-elections
- 2014 Griffith by-election
- 2005 Redcliffe state by-election
