= United Retail Federation =

URF
- United Retail Federation
- Founded: 1887
- Headquarters: Queensland
- Location: Australia

The United Retail Federation was an industrial organisation of employers and one of Australia's oldest. It traces its origins to Grocers Associations in 1887. As one of the nation's oldest industry bodies it had exercised an influence on Australian Governments and public policy since federation.

== History ==
The origins of United Retail Federation can be traced back to a meeting held 29 June 1887 at which it was proposed to establish a Grocers Association. By August of the same year the Brisbane Grocers Association had established offices in the Hunter's Treasury Buildings in George Street, Brisbane. The committee were meeting regularly every 3rd Tuesday of the month and employed a Secretary to manage the affairs of the 'subscribers'.

The Association grew quickly and by November 1889 had become the Brisbane Traders Association - a name change brought about by the growing diversity of its 'subscribers'. The Annual Report of 17 October 1898 shows 274 names on the members roll. Prominent traders on the list of members included Allan & Stark, T.C. Beirne and Overell & Coy.

== 1900 - 1940 ==
In July 1901 the Association moved to new offices in the Darragh's Building in Queen Street. By this time reports of the quarterly meetings were being printed in the Courier Mail.

In 1910 The Brisbane Trader's Association Annual Report shows several affiliated bodies covering a total of 215 firms in addition to the normal membership.

They were:-

- The Brisbane Grocers (84 firms)
- The Brisbane Drapers (15 firms)
- The Master Butchers (42 firms)
- The Brisbane Tobacconists (47 firms)

The first issue of "The Queensland Grocer" was printed in January 1923. By this time the Association had moved to larger premises in Commerce House Adelaide Street.

The first meeting of the Queensland Grocers Association took place in the rooms of the Brisbane Traders Association on 16 July 1924 and was attended by representatives of the Brisbane Grocers Association and the Brisbane & Suburban Shopkeepers Association who, while still operating as independent bodies, formed the nucleus of the QGA.

In May 1925, the Queensland Grocers Association affiliated with the Federation of Retail Grocers Associations of Australia.

In 1933, the Brisbane & Suburban Shopkeepers Association became the Queensland Shopkeepers Association. On 8 November 1933 "The Queensland Retailer" was first published - as a result of a name change from "The Queensland Grocer" to better reflect the growing diversity of membership. This title is still going strong today, as our monthly magazine (now known as the "Australian Retailer") which is now distributed across the country.

== 1940 - 1970 ==
At an Extraordinary General Meeting of the members of the Queensland Grocers Association held at the registered offices, 3rd Floor, Commerce House, Adelaide Street on Thursday 10 December 1942, the resolution to change the name from Queensland Grocers Association to Queensland Grocers and Retail Traders Association was unanimously adopted.

During the second World War the Association was an integral part of the war effort and involved on many committees covering every aspect that may have affected retail e.g. Rationing, blackouts, manpower, regulated pricing. It was in 1943 during the depths of war that the first State Conference was held in Rockhampton. That conference went on to become known as GREATA, and continued for over 50 years, until 1996.

The Association's name was changed once again in April 1954 to "The Queensland Retail Traders Association (of Grocers, Drapers and General Stores)".

== Modern times ==
On 26 January 1974 the Association offices at Buchanan St, West End were flooded in the 1974 Brisbane Flood. Many of the records were water damaged, and the Federation still has the plaque showing the level of water which swept through the building - 5 feet high.

May 1975 "The Queensland Shopkeeper" and the "Retailer of Queensland" merged to become the official journal for both the Queensland Shopkeepers Association and the Queensland Retail Traders Association.

On 31 January 1978, the Queensland Retail Traders Association and the Queensland Shopkeepers Association merged to become the Queensland Retail Traders and Shopkeepers Association.

In June 1987, QRTSA celebrated its Centenary - as part of this celebration, the Association moved offices to its current location.

In 2010 the organisation re-branded under the leadership of Scott Driscoll, who was first appointed Executive Director and then elected National President. The organisation was thereafter known as the United Retail Federation, to reflect the membership having spread across all states of Australia and the scope of activities of the organisation being on a truly national basis. Throughout its history, the United Retail Federation's objective has been to protect and advocate for independent retailers, lobby all levels of government on their behalf and help them in their day-to-day business operations as much as possible via key services and professional and industry advice.

The organisation was wound up in 2015.
