= 2005 Redcliffe state by-election =

A by-election was held for the Legislative Assembly of Queensland district of Redcliffe on 20 August 2005. It was triggered by the resignation of sitting Labor member and Speaker Ray Hollis.

The by-election was held to coincide with the Chatsworth by-election on the same day. Both contests resulted in the Labor Party losing the seat to the rival Liberal Party. Terry Rogers was elected as the new member for Redcliffe.

== Background ==
Ray Hollis first entered parliament at the 1989 state election and held the seat of Redcliffe at every election thereafter. When Labor came to power at the 1998 state election, Hollis was appointed Speaker of the Legislative Assembly of Queensland.

On 21 July 2005, Hollis announced his retirement from politics, citing ill health. This followed political controversy over whether Hollis's claimed travel expenses had been authorised, although the Crime and Misconduct Commission did not consider the matter suspicious.

== Candidates ==
At the 2004 state election, Ray Hollis's two party preferred vote was slashed to 57.1%, down from 67.6% at the previous election. The Liberal candidate who achieved that swing of 10.5% was Terry Rogers. Rogers was chosen unopposed as the Liberal candidate for the Redcliffe by-election.

The Labor Party chose school teacher Lillian van Litsenburg to defend Redcliffe, a seat they'd held for the past 19 years.

Also standing at the by-election was independent candidate Rob McJannett who, as the only non-major party candidate to run for Redcliffe, achieved a hefty 14.3% of the primary vote at the 2004 state election.

== Results ==
Redcliffe state by-election, 2005
| Party | Candidate | Votes | % | ±% |
|---|---|---|---|---|
| Liberal | Terry Rogers | 9,425 | 41.17 | +5.54 |
| Labor | Lillian van Litsenburg | 9,076 | 39.65 | −10.43 |
| Greens | Pete Johnson | 1,467 | 6.41 | +6.41 |
| | Terry Shaw | 1,171 | 5.12 | +5.12 |
| | Rob McJannett | 869 | 3.80 | −10.49 |
| One Nation | Susan Meredith | 762 | 3.33 | +3.33 |
| | Rod McDonough | 121 | 0.53 | +0.53 |
| Total formal votes | | 22,891 | 97.65 | −0.01 |
| Informal votes | | 550 | 2.35 | +0.01 |
| Turnout | | 23,441 | 87.78 | −4.93 |
Two-party-preferred result
| Liberal | Terry Rogers | 10,466 | 51.25 | +8.35 |
| Labor | Lillian van Litsenburg | 9,955 | 48.75 | −8.35 |
| Liberal gain from Labor | | Swing | +8.35 | |

== Aftermath ==
The by-election win of Terry Rogers, along with that of Michael Caltabiano in Chatsworth, was a flip for the Liberal Party, who increased their numbers in the Legislative Assembly from five to seven. However, the Liberal Party's hold on these two seats did not last long; both returned to the Labor fold at the 2006 state election.

Labor's unsuccessful candidate for the Redcliffe by-election, Lillian van Litsenburg, was again the Labor candidate for the seat at the 2006 state election when she was elected the member for Redcliffe.

== See also ==
- 2014 Redcliffe state by-election
- List of Queensland state by-elections
