= Bob Quinn (Australian politician) =

Australian politician

Leader of the Queensland Liberal Party Elections: 2004
- In office 28 February 2001 – 7 August 2006
- Deputy: Joan Sheldon (2001-2004); Bruce Flegg (2004-2006)
- Preceded by: David Watson
- Succeeded by: Bruce Flegg

Shadow Treasurer of Queensland
- In office 27 September 2005 – 8 August 2006
- Leader: Lawrence Springborg
- Preceded by: Jeff Seeney
- Succeeded by: Michael Caltabiano
- In office 22 April 2003 – 8 March 2004
- Leader: Lawrence Springborg
- Preceded by: Jeff Seeney
- Succeeded by: Jeff Seeney

Shadow Minister for Education
- In office 2 July 1998 – 17 February 2001
- Leader: Rob Borbidge
- Preceded by: Stephen Bredhauer
- Succeeded by: Kev Lingard
- In office 1 November 1992 – 19 February 1996
- Leader: Rob Borbidge
- Preceded by: Kev Lingard
- Succeeded by: Stephen Bredhauer

Deputy Leader of the Queensland Liberal Party
- In office 23 June 1998 – 28 February 2001
- Leader: David Watson
- Preceded by: Denver Beanland
- Succeeded by: Joan Sheldon

Minister for Education of Queensland
- In office 26 February 1996 – 26 June 1998
- Premier: Rob Borbidge
- Preceded by: David Hamill
- Succeeded by: Dean Wells

Member of the Queensland Parliament for Robina Merrimac (1992–2001) South Coast (1989–1992)
- In office 2 December 1989 – 9 September 2006
- Preceded by: Judy Gamin
- Succeeded by: Ray Stevens

Personal details
- Born: Robert Joseph Quinn; 9 September 1947 (age 79) Murwillumbah, New South Wales, Australia
- Party: Liberal Party
- Occupation: School Teacher

Robert Joseph Quinn (born 9 September 1947 in Murwillumbah, NSW) is an Australian Liberal Party politician in the Queensland parliament. He was leader of the Queensland Liberal Party from 2001 until being ousted on 7 August 2006 by Bruce Flegg.

Quinn was a schoolteacher before entering politics.

== Political career ==
He was elected to Parliament in 1989 after winning the seat of South Coast. The booming population of the Gold Coast saw Quinn's electorate undergo several redistributions and name changes. He was the member for Merrimac from 1992 to 2001 and the member for Robina from 2001 till his retirement from politics in 2006.

The Liberal Party victory in the Mundingburra by-election in February 1996 brought about a hung parliament in Queensland. Independent Liz Cunningham held the balance of power and chose to support the Borbidge-led Liberal-National Coalition in forming government. Quinn subsequently became Minister for Education.

The Labor Party, led by Peter Beattie, won office in the June 1998 state election, which ended the Coalition agreement between the two parties. Dr David Watson took over the Liberal Leadership from Joan Sheldon and Quinn became Deputy Leader of the Party.

=== Leader of the Liberals (2001–06) ===
In the 2001 state election, Labor dealt a massive blow to the reformed Coalition, with the Liberal Party winning only three seats in the 89 member Parliament. Watson resigned as leader and with Sheldon being the only other Liberal MP, Quinn became the Liberal Leader by default. Again, the Coalition agreement was torn up after the defeat.

The Liberals negotiated a new Coalition agreement with the Nationals and their new leader, Lawrence Springborg in April 2003. As leader of the junior party, Quinn became Deputy Leader of the Opposition and Shadow Treasurer. He forged a close working relationship with Springborg and made efforts to repair the damaged relationship between the two parties.

During the 2004 election campaign, Quinn worked closely with Springborg, but was criticised by some Liberals for being too subservient to the Nationals Leader. The Coalition again suffered a massive defeat at the hands of the ALP, with the Liberal Party gaining just two additional seats, lifting its representation to five. When the Coalition agreement automatically expired following the election loss, the two parties opted not to renew it. This decision meant that the Liberals lost their status as members of the Official Opposition (this place being taken by the National Party alone).

After the election, Quinn gained some prominence in the wake of the failures of the Government-owned electricity corporation Energex in South East Queensland. The scandal surrounding Dr Jayant Patel also caused considerable damage to the Beattie Government in 2005. The Liberal Party won the two Labor held seats of Chatsworth and Redcliffe in by-elections in August 2005, bringing the Liberal parliamentary representation to seven seats. However, former Brisbane City councillor Michael Caltabiano, who was elected as the Member for Chatsworth, was touted in the media as a likely challenger to Quinn's leadership.

Quinn and his party dismissed suggestions from Lawrence Springborg that the two conservative parties merge as impractical, but the parties did announce the renewal of their Coalition agreement on 28 September 2005, but without Quinn becoming Deputy Leader of the Opposition.

In February 2005, Bob Quinn criticised then-Premier Peter Beattie for failing to support a scheme which would mandate the addition of fluoride to drinking water in Queensland to improve children's dental health.

In November 2005, Independent Gympie MP Elisa Roberts accused Quinn of attempting to bribe her. Roberts alleged Quinn offered her $60,000 to join the Liberal Party before the next state election, due in February 2007. Three separate investigations conducted by the Queensland Electoral Commission, the Crime and Misconduct Commission and the Queensland Police all found insufficient evidence to prove the bribery allegations, thus clearing Quinn of any wrongdoing.

On 7 August 2006, Quinn was ousted by a vote in the Liberal Party party room, culminating with the unanimous election of Bruce Flegg as his replacement. On 11 August 2006 he announced that he would not contest the next state election.

Quinn was also an unsuccessful candidate in 2007 for the Senate vacancy caused by the resignation of former deputy state leader and Quinn's former state parliamentary colleague Santo Santoro.

Quinn is a member of the Local Government Reform Commission.

== See also ==
- Members of the Queensland Legislative Assembly, 2004-2006; 2001-2004; 1998-2001; 1995-1998; 1992-1995; 1989-1992

Parliament of Queensland
Preceded by Judy Gamin	Member for South Coast; 1989–1992	Succeeded by Seat abolished
Preceded by New seat	Member for Merrimac; 1992–2001	Succeeded by Seat abolished
Preceded by New seat	Member for Robina; 2001–2006	Succeeded by Ray Stevens
Political offices
Preceded by David Watson	Parliamentary Leader of the Liberal Party in Queensland; 2001–2006	Succeeded by Bruce Flegg
