= 2006 Queensland state election =

- 9 September 2006

All 89 seats in the Legislative Assembly of Queensland 45 Assembly seats were needed for a majority
- Turnout: 90.47 (▼0.97 pp)
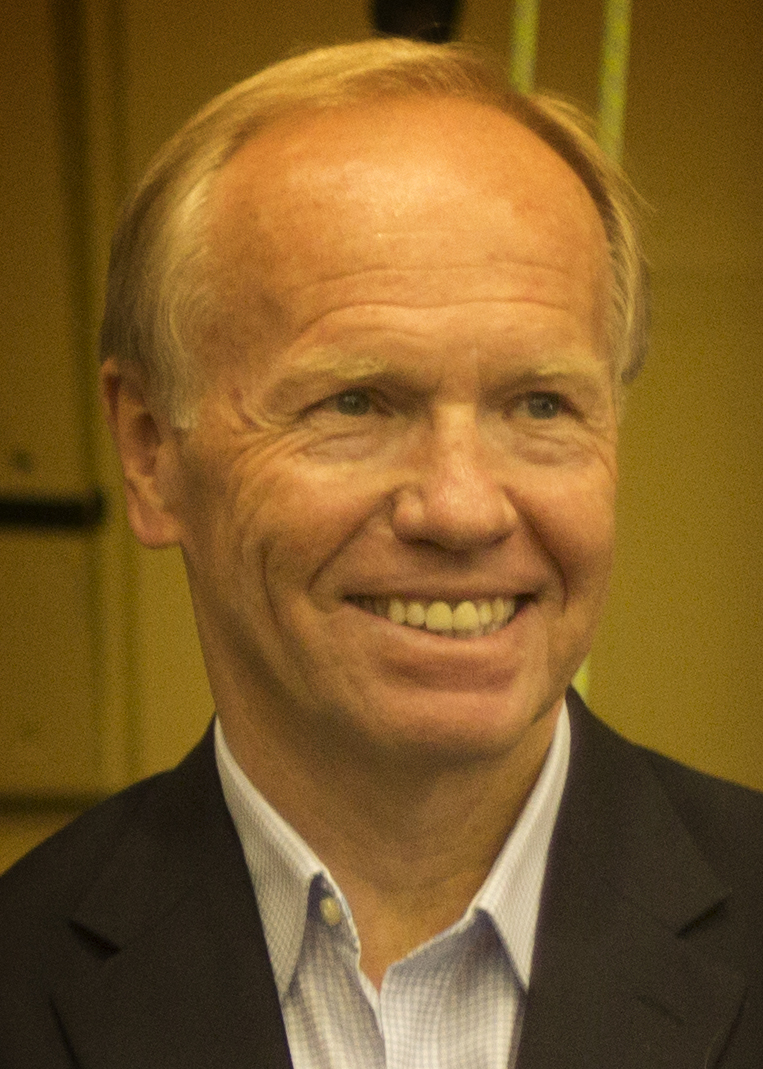

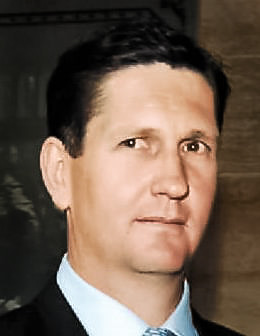
	First party	Second party	Third party
			ON
Leader	Peter Beattie	Lawrence Springborg	Rosa Lee Long
Party	Labor	National–Liberal Coalition	One Nation
Leader since	20 February 1996	4 February 2003	7 February 2004
Leader's seat	Brisbane Central	Southern Downs	Tablelands
Last election	63 seats, 47.01%	20 seats, 35.46%	1 seat, 4.88%
Seats won	59	25	1
Seat change	▼4	▲5	Steady
Popular vote	1,032,617	834,577	13,207
Percentage	46.92%	37.92%	0.60%
Swing	▼0.09	▲2.46	▼4.28
TPP	55.0%	45.0%
- The top map shows the first party preference by electorate. The bottom map shows the final two-party preferred vote result by electorate.
Premier before election
Peter Beattie
Labor
Elected Premier
Peter Beattie
Labor

An election was held in the Australian state of Queensland on 9 September 2006 to elect the 89 members of the state's Legislative Assembly, after being announced by Premier Peter Beattie on 15 August 2006.

The election saw the incumbent Labor government led by Premier Peter Beattie defeat the National-Liberal Coalition led by Lawrence Springborg and Bruce Flegg respectively, and gain a fourth consecutive term in office. Beattie thus became the first Labor Premier of Queensland to win four consecutive elections since William Forgan Smith did so in the 1930s. Had Beattie served out his fourth term, he would have become the second-longest serving Queensland Premier, after Sir Joh Bjelke-Petersen. After the election, Springborg resigned as Opposition Leader, being replaced by Jeff Seeney.

This was the last election contested by the Queensland Liberal Party and National Party, who merged to form the Liberal National Party of Queensland on 26 July 2008.

== Background ==
From mid-2005, after the revelation of the Jayant Patel scandal, the issue of health had become a focus of controversy, damaging to the Beattie government. After several inquiries and industrial disputes, a restructure of Queensland Health took place, and the state government was at the time lobbying the federal government for more doctor training places in universities for Queensland.

Other issues of importance at the election included environmental management and land clearing, asbestos in state schools, the provision of transportation and infrastructure to rural and regional areas, and the management of South East Queensland's population growth.

The campaign started unusually with Premier Peter Beattie denying a general election was about to be called, while residents in some Gold Coast electorates received direct mail from the ALP stating that the election had been called for September.

At a press conference on 16 August, Liberal leader Bruce Flegg stated that in the event that the Coalition won government, and the Liberal Party won more seats than the Nationals, Lawrence Springborg would still become Premier. Other Liberal Party MPs such as Michael Caltabiano disagreed, as this ran contrary to the coalition agreement signed between the two parties, which stated that whichever party won the most seats would form government. The ALP used this to attack Coalition stability in media and advertising.

Flegg was subsequently asked to leave a shopping centre in the Redcliffe suburb of Kippa-Ring for failing to obtain permission to do a campaign walkthrough. Flegg later denied that he had in fact been evicted.

On 22 August, Flegg took part in a media conference with Julie Bishop, federal Liberal Minister for Education, where he endorsed a Federal Government plan for the mandatory teaching of Australian history in schools. Responding to questions from journalists, he failed to identify the date of arrival of the Second Fleet (1790), or the person after whom Brisbane was named (noted astronomer and Governor of New South Wales Sir Thomas Brisbane).

Two sad twists of fate impacted the 26-day campaign - on 30 August, opposition leader Lawrence Springborg took temporary leave from the campaign after the sudden death of his father-in-law, and National Party deputy leader Jeff Seeney and Liberal leader Bruce Flegg continued the campaign in his absence. The death of TV personality Steve Irwin ("The Crocodile Hunter") on 4 September in an accident off Port Douglas, Queensland, took the media's focus away from the election in its final week.

Current Treasurer Anna Bligh has stated the coalition's major election promises of wiping out stamp duty within five years, increasing the first home buyers grant by $3,000 and introducing a 10% per litre subsidy on ethanol-blended petrol will cost $2.4 billion and has blown the budget. Lawrence Springborg says all his election promises are costed and affordable, with costings to be released two days before the election. So far these costings have not been released.

On Friday 8 September, the day before the election, Premier Beattie and Opposition Leader Springborg participated in a "great debate" at the Brisbane Convention & Exhibition Centre, moderated by ABC journalist Chris O'Brien.

Although Newspoll and other published polls showed Labor well ahead on predicted two-party-preferred vote, Labor strategists feared that people would vote for the Coalition in a protest vote, expecting Beattie not to lose. They adopted a strategy of denying Labor was in fact ahead. The Roy Morgan poll suggested the Liberal vote had fallen, while the Greens had risen to 8%.

== Key dates ==
Date	Event
15 August 2006	Writs were issued by the Governor to proceed with an election
19 August 2006	Close of electoral rolls
22 August 2006	Close of nominations
9 September 2006	Polling day, between the hours of 8am and 6pm
13 September 2006	Beattie Ministry reconstituted
22 September 2006	Writ returned and results formally declared
10 October 2006	52nd Parliament convened

== Retiring members ==
=== Labor ===
- Tom Barton (Waterford)
- Darryl Briskey (Cleveland)
- Lesley Clark (Barron River)
- Nita Cunningham (Bundaberg)
- Jim Fouras (Ashgrove)
- Don Livingstone (Ipswich West)
- Tony McGrady (Mount Isa)
- Gordon Nuttall (Sandgate)
- Henry Palaszczuk (Inala)
- Terry Sullivan (Stafford)

=== Liberal ===
- Bob Quinn (Robina)

=== National ===
- Marc Rowell (Hinchinbrook)

== Results ==
Party	Votes	%	+/–	Seats	+/–
Labor	1,032,617	46.92	▼0.09	59	▼4
Liberal	442,453	20.10	▲1.60	8	▲3
National	392,124	17.82	▲0.86	17	▲2
Greens	175,798	7.99	▲1.23	0	0
Independents	103,022	4.68	▼1.15	4	▼1
Family First Party	41,659	1.89	New	0	New
One Nation	13,207	0.60	▼4.28	1	0
Total	2,200,880	100.00	–	89	–
Valid votes	2,200,880	97.92			
Invalid/blank votes	46,848	2.08	▲0.09		
Total votes	2,247,728	100.00	–		
Registered voters/turnout	2,484,479	90.47	▼0.97		
Two-party-preferred (Note: Exact numbers are an estimate)
Labor	1,122,233	55.04			
Liberal	916,816	44.96			
Total	2,039,049	100.00			

Popular vote
Labor	46.92%
Liberal	20.10%
Nationals	17.82%
Greens	7.99%
Family First	1.89%
One Nation	0.60%
Independents	4.68%

Two-party preferred vote (estimate)
Labor	55.0%
Liberal	45.0%

Seats
Labor	66.29%
Nationals	19.10%
Liberal	8.99%
One Nation	1.12%
Independents	4.49%

== Seats changing hands ==
Seat	2004 Election			Swing	2006 Election		
Seat	Party	Member	Margin	Swing	Margin	Member	Party
Bundaberg	Labor	Nita Cunningham	5.29	–6.24	0.95	Jack Dempsey	National
Chatsworth	Liberal	Michael Caltabiano¹	2.49	–3.37	0.78	Chris Bombolas	Labor
Clayfield	Labor	Liddy Clark	1.17	–2.85	1.67	Tim Nicholls	Liberal
Gaven	National	Alex Douglas¹	3.35	–6.44	3.09	Phil Gray	Labor
Gympie	Independent	Elisa Roberts	10.05	–28.29	18.24	David Gibson	National
Kawana	Labor	Chris Cummins	1.48	–7.15	5.68	Steve Dickson	Liberal
Noosa	Labor	Cate Molloy²	8.66	–14.98	6.32	Glen Elmes	Liberal
Redcliffe	Liberal	Terry Rogers¹	1.25	–6.70	5.45	Lillian van Litsenburg	Labor

- Members listed in italics did not contest their seat at this election.
- ¹ Michael Caltabiano gained Chatsworth for the Liberal Party at the 2005 by-election. Alex Douglas gained Gaven for the National Party at the 2006 by-election. Terry Rogers gained Redcliffe for the Liberal Party at the 2005 by-election. The Labor Party had retained Chatsworth, Gaven, and Redcliffe at the 2004 election.
- ² Cate Molloy resigned from the Labor Party and contested the election as an independent.

== Post-election pendulum ==
Labor seats (59)
Marginal
Cleveland	Phil Weightman	ALP	0.54%
Chatsworth	Chris Bombolas	ALP	0.78%
Hervey Bay	Andrew McNamara	ALP	1.79%
Indooroopilly	Ronan Lee	ALP	2.43%
Mudgeeraba	Dianne Reilly	ALP	2.93%
Gaven	Phil Gray	ALP	3.09%
Whitsunday	Jan Jarratt	ALP	4.36%
Aspley	Bonny Barry	ALP	4.61%
Barron River	Steve Wettenhall	ALP	5.14%
Springwood	Barbara Stone	ALP	5.17%
Broadwater	Peta-Kaye Croft	ALP	5.21%
Pumicestone	Carryn Sullivan	ALP	5.42%
Redcliffe	Lillian van Litsenburg	ALP	5.45%
Fairly Safe
Redlands	John English	ALP	6.92%
Keppel	Paul Hoolihan	ALP	7.19%
Glass House	Carolyn Male	ALP	7.68%
Mansfield	Phil Reeves	ALP	7.73%
Cairns	Desley Boyle	ALP	8.07%
Ashgrove	Kate Jones	ALP	8.08%
Burleigh	Christine Smith	ALP	8.33%
Townsville	Mike Reynolds	ALP	9.10%
Southport	Peter Lawlor	ALP	9.11%
Mulgrave	Warren Pitt	ALP	9.92%
Safe
Greenslopes	Gary Fenlon	ALP	10.11%
Everton	Rod Welford	ALP	10.15%
Mount Ommaney	Julie Attwood	ALP	10.20%
Kallangur	Ken Hayward	ALP	10.33%
Toowoomba North	Kerry Shine	ALP	10.41%
Mount Coot-tha	Andrew Fraser	ALP	10.45%
Murrumba	Dean Wells	ALP	11.58%
Mundingburra	Lindy Nelson-Carr	ALP	11.83%
Ferny Grove	Geoff Wilson	ALP	12.07%
Mount Isa	Betty Kiernan	ALP	12.28%
Kurwongbah	Linda Lavarch	ALP	12.36%
Mount Gravatt	Judy Spence	ALP	12.88%
Ipswich West	Wayne Wendt	ALP	13.11%
Yeerongpilly	Simon Finn	ALP	13.75%
Stretton	Stephen Robertson	ALP	14.19%
Brisbane Central	Peter Beattie	ALP	14.77%
Stafford	Stirling Hinchliffe	ALP	14.89%
Cook	Jason O'Brien	ALP	15.13%
Sandgate	Vicky Darling	ALP	15.19%
Waterford	Evan Moorhead	ALP	15.85%
Capalaba	Michael Choi	ALP	16.17%
Bulimba	Pat Purcell	ALP	16.24%
Fitzroy	Jim Pearce	ALP	16.40%
Lytton	Paul Lucas	ALP	16.85%
Albert	Margaret Keech	ALP	17.01%
Thuringowa	Craig Wallace	ALP	17.01%
Mackay	Tim Mulherin	ALP	17.62%
Algester	Karen Struthers	ALP	17.84%
Nudgee	Neil Roberts	ALP	18.34%
South Brisbane	Anna Bligh	ALP	18.39%
Very Safe
Rockhampton	Robert Schwarten	ALP	20.52%
Ipswich	Rachel Nolan	ALP	21.62%
Logan	John Mickel	ALP	23.90%
Bundamba	Jo-Ann Miller	ALP	24.78%
Inala	Annastacia Palaszczuk	ALP	26.34%
Woodridge	Desley Scott	ALP	28.99%

National/Liberal seats (25)
Marginal
Bundaberg	Jack Dempsey	NAT	0.95%
Clayfield	Tim Nicholls	LIB	1.67%
Lockyer	Ian Rickuss	NAT	1.74%
Currumbin	Jann Stuckey	LIB	2.22%
Burdekin	Rosemary Menkens	NAT	2.40%
Robina	Ray Stevens	LIB	2.53%
Hinchinbrook	Andrew Cripps	NAT	3.69%
Caloundra	Mark McArdle	LIB	4.45%
Beaudesert	Kev Lingard	NAT	4.49%
Kawana	Steve Dickson	LIB	5.68%
Fairly Safe
Noosa	Glen Elmes	LIB	6.32% v IND
Mirani	Ted Malone	NAT	6.47%
Burnett	Rob Messenger	NAT	7.57%
Moggill	Bruce Flegg	LIB	7.95%
Toowoomba South	Mike Horan	NAT	9.79%
Safe
Maroochydore	Fiona Simpson	NAT	10.68%
Charters Towers	Shane Knuth	NAT	11.05%
Surfers Paradise	John-Paul Langbroek	LIB	11.98%
Cunningham	Stuart Copeland	NAT	16.43%
Gregory	Vaughan Johnson	NAT	17.96%
Gympie	David Gibson	NAT	18.24% v IND
Darling Downs	Ray Hopper	NAT	19.14%
Very Safe
Southern Downs	Lawrence Springborg	NAT	20.28%
Callide	Jeff Seeney	NAT	22.28%
Warrego	Howard Hobbs	NAT	23.34%
Crossbench seats (5)
Gladstone	Liz Cunningham	IND	1.99% v ALP
Nanango	Dorothy Pratt	IND	4.24% v NAT
Tablelands	Rosa Lee Long	ONP	19.77% v ALP
Nicklin	Peter Wellington	IND	25.08% v NAT
Maryborough	Chris Foley	IND	32.73% v ALP

== Subsequent changes ==
- On 13 September 2007, Labor Premier Peter Beattie (Brisbane Central) resigned. At the by-election on 13 October 2007, Grace Grace retained the seat for the Labor Party.
- On 26 July 2008, the Queensland Liberal Party and the Queensland National Party agreed to merge into the Liberal National Party. All sitting Liberal Party and National Party members became members of the Liberal National Party.
- On 5 October 2008, Ronan Lee (Indooroopilly) resigned from the Labor Party and joined the Greens.
- On 24 February 2009, Stuart Copeland (Cunningham) resigned from the Liberal National Party and sat as an independent.

== State of the parties before the election ==
Since April 2006, the ALP held 60 of the 89 seats in the Legislative Assembly, the Coalition 23 seats (16 National and seven Liberal), along with five Independents and one member of the One Nation Party. Thus to win an outright majority (45 seats), the Coalition would have needed to win an additional 22 seats from the ALP, the Independents or One Nation, assuming that they retained all of their own seats. This would have required a uniform swing against Labor of approximately 8% (such swings are very rare).

Sitting Labor member for Noosa, Cate Molloy, had resigned from the Labor Party following her disendorsement as a Labor candidate, which in turn followed her repudiation of the state government's plans to build a dam on the Mary River at Traveston. Molloy recontested the seat as an independent.

=== Members who did not recontest their seats ===
A number of members of parliament retired at this election:

- Tom Barton: Waterford, ALP
- Darryl Briskey: Cleveland, ALP
- Dr Lesley Clark: Barron River, ALP
- Nita Cunningham: Bundaberg, ALP
- Jim Fouras: Ashgrove, ALP
- Don Livingstone: Ipswich West, ALP
- Tony McGrady: Mount Isa, ALP
- Gordon Nuttall: Sandgate, ALP
- Henry Palaszczuk: Inala, ALP
- Bob Quinn: Robina, Liberal
- Terry Sullivan: Stafford, ALP
- Marc Rowell: Hinchinbrook, Nationals

== Polling ==
Legislative Assembly opinion polling
	Primary vote					2PP vote
Date	ALP	LIB	NAT	GRN	OTH	ALP	L/NP
2006 election	46.9%	20.1%	17.8%	8.0%	7.2%	55.0%	45.0%
6–7 Sep 2006	48%	21%	17%	4%	10%	55%	45%
25–28 Aug 2006	52%	20%	16%	2%	10%	58%	42%
Jul–Aug 2006	45%	25%	13%	2%	15%	54%	46%
Apr–Jun 2006	41%	26%	13%	4%	16%	52%	48%
Jan–Mar 2006	40%	28%	14%	4%	14%	50%	50%
Oct–Dec 2005	40%	27%	16%	3%	14%	50%	50%
Aug–Sep 2005	41%	26%	16%	4%	13%	50%	50%
Jul–Aug 2005	40%	27%	15%	3%	15%	50%	50%
Apr–Jun 2005	47%	23%	14%	3%	13%	56%	44%
Jan–Mar 2005	46%	27%	11%	5%	11%	55%	45%
Oct–Dec 2004	43%	29%	12%	3%	13%	52%	48%
2004 election	47.0%	18.5%	17.0%	6.7%	10.8%	55.5%	44.5%
4-5 Feb 2004	50%	18%	15%	5%	12%	59%	41%

Labor's high levels of support was maintained until mid-2005 when support for Labor slumped and the Coalition opened a minor lead on primary votes for the first time since 1996. However, this was eventually wiped out as Labor restored a huge lead in polls in the lead up to the election and the Coalition only managed a 0.5% swing. Even though some mid-term polls suggested a swing of up to 6% against Labor, a swing of over 8% was required for Labor to lose its majority.

== See also ==
- Candidates of the Queensland state election, 2006
- Members of the Queensland Legislative Assembly, 2004–2006
- Members of the Queensland Legislative Assembly, 2006–2009
- Beattie Ministry
