= Scott Driscoll =

Australian politician and businessman

Member of the Queensland Parliament for Redcliffe
- In office 24 March 2012 – 19 November 2013
- Preceded by: Lillian van Litsenburg
- Succeeded by: Yvette D'Ath

Personal details
- Born: Scott Nicolaus Driscoll; 16 April 1975 (age 51) Redcliffe, Queensland, Australia
- Party: Liberal National (2012–2013); Independent (2013)
- Profession: Business, Politics, National industry association leadership.

Scott Nicolaus Driscoll (born 16 April 1975) is a former Australian politician, national peak industry association president, company director and a businessman. He was elected to the Queensland Parliament on 24 March 2012 as the Member for Redcliffe. He was also Executive Director and then elected National President of peak national industry association, the United Retail Federation.

== Industry association leadership ==
Driscoll was executive director and then elected president of the United Retail Federation. He oversaw the rebranding of the organisation and expanded its membership footprint and political influence beyond Queensland and onto a national level. By 2010 Driscoll was referenced in the Sydney Morning Herald while pictured with Federal Opposition Leader Tony Abbott at Kirribilli as one of the fiercest and most recognised national industry leaders in Australia. His growing national prominence and sometimes outspoken views attracted opposition from a number of corporate, industry and political rivals, including industry associations that the Sydney Morning Herald reported were seeking to curtail his influence. Driscoll was also quoted extensively across national media outlets around this same period calling for a ban in Australia on the wearing of hijabs or burqas and other identity distorting garments.

== Political career ==
Driscoll was elected to the Legislative Assembly at the 2012 state election representing the Liberal National Party of Queensland in the Brisbane-area seat of Redcliffe. He defeated Labor incumbent Lillian van Litsenburg with a two-party-preferred swing of 15.67 percentage points, turning the previously marginal seat into a safe LNP seat.

From November 2012, Driscoll became the subject of complaints and media reports concerning allegations that he controlled the Moreton Bay Regional Community Association. Media reports attributed related fraud allegations referred to Queensland Police to Labor MP Jackie Trad.

On 19 March 2013, the Crime and Misconduct Commission stated that its assessment of a referral received in November 2012 had concluded that the matter did not involve official misconduct and fell outside its jurisdiction. That outcome had been communicated to the referring department on 7 December 2012. The commission distinguished this assessment from an investigation and said it was assessing new information to determine whether further action was required.

Media reports subsequently described instructions from Premier Campbell Newman's media advisers that Driscoll avoid responding independently to journalists and submit proposed responses for vetting through the Premier's office.

Although Newman initially supported Driscoll, he subsequently recommended his suspension from the LNP, saying the controversy had become a distraction for the government. Driscoll was suspended on 25 March 2013.

After the LNP executive initiated proceedings to expel him, Driscoll resigned from the party on 19 April 2013 and subsequently sat as an independent MP.

On 11 May 2013, three weeks after his resignation from the party, Driscoll's family home was raided by the Crime and Misconduct Commission. In November 2013, his wife was charged with fraud-related offences and perjury following a joint police and CMC investigation.

=== Suspension of inquiry ===
On 19 March 2013, Opposition Leader Annastacia Palaszczuk raised allegations concerning Driscoll's Register of Members' Interests, which the Registrar referred to the Ethics Committee. On 10 April, the committee suspended its inquiry while related CMC and police matters remained underway. Its subsequent report explained that suspension followed the established practice of previous ethics committees and that departing from that precedent was considered significant.

By the time the committee reconsidered the suspension, Driscoll had resigned from the LNP and was sitting as an independent member. The committee considering the allegations against him was chaired by LNP MP Peter Dowling, while Labor MP Jackie Trad served as acting deputy chair. Trad had also been identified in contemporary media reporting as the source of related fraud allegations referred to Queensland Police.

On 3 June 2013, LNP Premier Campbell Newman wrote to the committee requesting that it reconsider its suspension. The committee described such an executive-government request as "unprecedented in Queensland", as far as it had been advised. It recorded that, “as a direct result of the request of the Premier”, it resolved to reconsider its decision.

Independent MP and committee member Peter Wellington publicly expressed concern that recommencing the inquiry could jeopardise future legal proceedings. Newman insisted that the committee could proceed without interfering with the other investigations.

Following Newman's request, the committee adopted what its report described as "a new test" for determining whether an inquiry should proceed while related law-enforcement investigations remained underway. Applying that "new test", it resolved by majority to recommence its inquiry into Driscoll. It did so at a time when, as the report recorded, the CMC had not yet reported on its investigation and no criminal charges had been laid.

=== Medical circumstances, committee findings and resignation ===
During 2013, Driscoll provided medical certificates from a specialist doctor and a general practitioner supporting his absence from Parliament. He advised he was receiving specialist care and had been attempting to fulfil his parliamentary responsibilities to the best of his ability. He also advised his specialists had written to the committee and advised that his medical condition prevented him from giving evidence in the immediate future.

During this period, Newman publicly called for Driscoll to resign and raised his expulsion from Parliament if he did not. Labor also criticised Newman over his earlier support for Driscoll.

On 19 November 2013, the Ethics Committee reported its findings concerning Driscoll's registration of interests, recommending fines totalling $90,000 and his expulsion. Driscoll had not yet appeared personally before the committee to give evidence. The recommended fines comprised $84,000 for 42 failures to register interests, $4,000 for four further registration failures and $2,000 for misleading the House. Both Newman and Palaszczuk indicated their support for expulsion.

Driscoll resigned from Parliament that day citing his documented poor health.

On 21 November 2013, Driscoll appeared at the Bar of Parliament, where his solicitor, Peter Russo, spoke on his behalf. Russo told the House that Driscoll's illness and the advice of his treating medical specialists had prevented him from giving evidence to the committee. He argued that this had disadvantaged both Driscoll and the committee. Russo referred to Driscoll's earlier explanations that register omissions were unintended and that he had not knowingly completed the register incorrectly. He submitted that errors would have been corrected but for Driscoll's continuing health problems.

Russo requested that the proposed fine be reduced to $12,000. Parliament instead imposed the $90,000 fine. Driscoll paid it in full the following day.

The resulting 2014 Redcliffe by-election returned the seat to Labor with a large swing.

=== Electoral history ===
Queensland Legislative Assembly
Election year	Electorate	Party	Votes	FP%	+/-	2PP%	+/-	Result
1995	Kallangur	Liberal	9,496	36.30	▼1.60	46.0	▲8.10	Second
1998	Kallangur	Liberal	6,583	22.0	▼14.30	N/A	N/A	Third
2001	Kallangur	Liberal	4,366	19.10	▼2.90	28.60	▼14.80	Second
2012	Redcliffe	LNP	13,991	49.24	▲14.94	60.10	▲15.67	First

== Court proceedings ==
=== Emma Driscoll ===
In November 2013, Scott Driscoll's wife Emma was charged following a joint police and CMC investigation, while Driscoll himself remained uncharged. The charges against his wife comprised three counts of perjury, ten counts of making false entries in records and three counts of knowingly providing an official with a false or misleading document, all relating to her official position held within the United Retail Federation.

Emma Driscoll's separate proceeding had been listed for a six day trial beginning on 26 September, 2016. The court heard that she had created eight sets of minutes for meetings that had not occurred and had also made three false affidavits during her involvement with the association. Her original charges included three counts of perjury arising from the false affidavits. Under her plea arrangement negotiated with prosecutors, the perjury charges were not proceeded with and if she instead pleaded guilty to other dishonesty offences.

On the day the trial was due to commence, she pleaded guilty to eight counts of fraudulently falsifying records and three counts of making false declarations. She received a three year wholly suspended sentence and 120 hours of community service. On 15 November, she pleaded guilty in a separate proceeding to three remaining charges of providing false or misleading documents; a conviction was recorded without further punishment.

=== Bruce Mills ===
In 2016, Bruce Mills, a former associate, was sentenced to 50 hours of community service after pleading guilty to "two counts of fraudulently falsifying records and three counts of knowingly making a false entry on a document". Mills had previously testified to the Queensland Industrial Relations Commission that he has falsified minutes for Queensland Retail Traders and Shopkeepers Association meetings that never took place after the association was moved into Driscoll's electorate office. Mills claimed this was done at Driscoll's request, and that Driscoll has threatened him that "your body will turn up somewhere" if he didn't stay loyal to him. Mills's lawyer stated that Mills had attempted suicide due to intimidation from Driscoll.

=== Scott Driscoll ===
More than ten months after his wife was charged, on 7 October 2014, Driscoll was charged with 16 offences including fraud and soliciting secret commissions.

The proceedings concerned Driscoll's former role with the Queensland Retail Traders and Shopkeepers Association, also known as the United Retail Federation. ABC News reported that the charges stemmed from his time as head of the retail industry association and included the alleged falsification of association meeting minutes. On 25 November, 2016, Scott Driscoll pleaded guilty to 15 charges a week before his trial was scheduled to start.

On 10 March 2017, Driscoll was sentenced to six years' imprisonment, with eligibility for parole after serving 18 months.

== Activity after release ==
Driscoll became eligible for parole in September 2018, and by 2019 he had been released from jail and began marketing his services and a "PR, Media & Commuinication Strategist" and "Campaign & Branding Specialist".

In June 2026, Driscoll posted on his personal Instagram account that he was preparing a full account of the political and legal events surrounding his departure from the Queensland Parliament in 2013, and said the account would be supported by evidence and would challenge the motives and actions of those he described as his political opponents and the allegations made against him.

Parliament of Queensland
Preceded by Lillian van Litsenburg	Member for Redcliffe; 2012–2013	Succeeded by Yvette D'Ath
