= Kerri-Anne Dooley =

Australian politician

Kerri-Anne Dooley MP
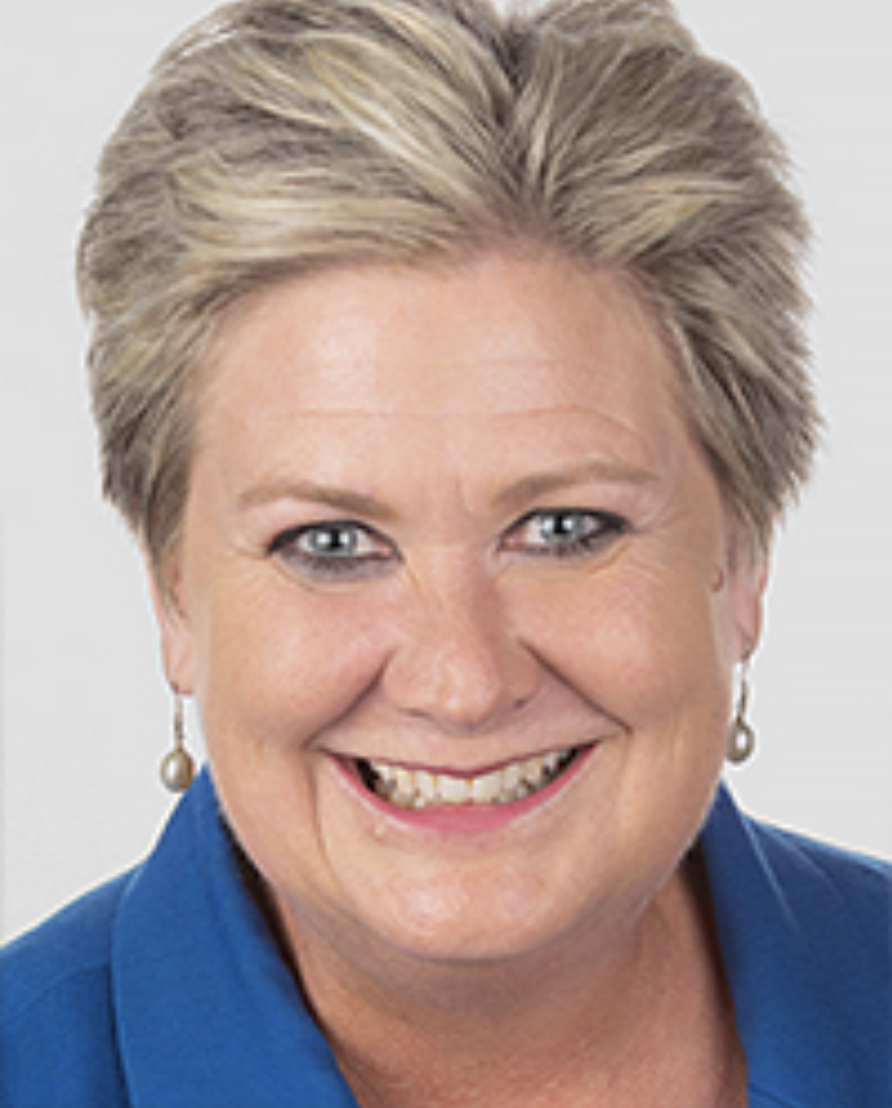
- Official Portrait

Member of the Queensland Legislative Assembly for Redcliffe
- Incumbent
- Assumed office 26 October 2024
- Preceded by: Yvette D'Ath

Personal details
- Party: Liberal National
- Other political affiliations: Family First Party (2012)
- Website: https://kerriannedooley.com.au/

Kerri-Anne Dooley is an Australian politician. She was elected member of the Legislative Assembly of Queensland for Redcliffe in the 2024 Queensland state election, after five unsuccessful times for the seat. In the 2012 Queensland state election she contested Redcliffe for the Family First Party. Since the 2014 by-election she has contested the seat for the Liberal National Party.

She has lived in Redcliffe, Queensland all her life.

Before politics, she worked as a registered nurse for over three decades, specializing in palliative care at Metro North Health. Prior to her nursing career, she served as an international volunteer with Youth With A Mission for five and a half years in Europe, Africa and Asia, where she learned French and Mandarin.

== Electoral History ==
Queensland Legislative Assembly
Election year	Electorate	Party	Votes	FP%	+/-	2PP%	+/-	Result
2012	Redcliffe	FFP	1,288	4.53	▲1.91	N/A	N/A	Fifth
2014	Redcliffe	LNP	9,724	34.90	▼14.40	42.90	▼17.20	Second
2015	Redcliffe	LNP	11,497	37.72	▼11.52	42.42	▼17.68	Second
2017	Redcliffe	LNP	11,414	37.20	▼0.50	45.10	▲2.70	Second
2020	Redcliffe	LNP	12,231	37.34	▲0.10	43.89	▼1.25	Second
2024	Redcliffe	LNP	15,851	44.43	▲7.13	52.92	▲9.02	First
