= Jim Houghton (politician) =

Australian politician

The Honourable Jim Houghton

Speaker of the Queensland Legislative Assembly
- In office 29 October 1974 – 4 July 1979
- Preceded by: Bill Longeran
- Succeeded by: Selwyn Muller

Member of the Queensland Legislative Assembly for Redcliffe
- In office 28 May 1960 – 7 Aug 1979
- Preceded by: New seat
- Succeeded by: Terry White

Personal details
- Born: James Edward Hiram Houghton; 13 September 1911 Sydney, New South Wales, Australia
- Died: 21 January 1985 (aged 73) Redcliffe, Queensland, Australia
- Resting place: Redcliffe Cemetery
- Party: Country Party/National Party
- Other political affiliations: Independent, Liberal Party
- Spouse: Mary Auld Shinnie (m.1938 d.1989)
- Occupation: Real estate agent

James Edward Hiram Houghton (13 September 1911 – 21 January 1985) was a member of the Queensland Legislative Assembly.

== Biography ==
Houghton was born in Sydney, New South Wales, the son of James Houghton and his wife Emily (née Corscadden) and the family moved to Queensland when he was still young. He was educated at Humpybong State School in Redcliffe before attending the Brisbane Technical College. He then embarked on a banking career with the Commercial Bank of Australia being posted to Woolloongabba, Ipswich, and Proston.

At the outbreak of World War II he joined the Australian Army, serving with the 5th Light Horse and 5th Motor Regiment and later rose to the rank of major with the 2/12 Battalion (7th Division) where he fought in New Guinea. He was discharged in 1945 and established a real estate business at Proston, later moving to Redcliffe.

On 24 February 1938. Houghton married Mary Auld Shinnie (died 1989) and together had two sons and two daughters. He died in January 1985 and was buried in the Redcliffe Cemetery.

== Public career ==
From 1955 to 1964, Houghton was the mayor of the Redcliffe Town Council which became the Redcliffe City Council in 1959. He missed out on pre-selection for the Country Party and instead stood as an independent for the new state seat of Redcliffe at the 1960 Queensland state election, easily winning the seat. He joined the Liberal Party in 1961 but was only a member of the party for a few months before again becoming an independent and in 1962 he re-joined the Country Party whom he represented for the rest of his political career.

He went on to represent the electorate until his resignation from politics in August 1979. He was the Speaker of the Queensland Legislative Assembly from 1974 until 1979. He had only been speaker for 55 minutes before ejecting the Labor member for Mourilyan Peter Moore for continual interjections. As Speaker, Houghton particularly rejected members who used parliamentary privilege to make unfounded allegations. In his maiden speech, Mr Houghton gave notice of his interest in keeping debate within the bounds of parliamentary dignity. In the speech he castigated members who used the Chamber as a place where, under parliamentary privilege, they could denigrate a person or organisation. He was particularly critical of members who, having made allegations, refused to make information available outside the House to assist police investigations.

Houghton worked hard to have the toll on the Hornibrook Highway removed and have the road links with Redcliffe upgraded. In his honour, the new bridge replacing the Hornibrook Highway was named the Houghton Highway.

Parliament of Queensland
Preceded by Bill Longeran	Speaker of the Legislative Assembly; 1974–1979	Succeeded by Selwyn Muller
New seat	Member for Redcliffe; 1960–1979	Succeeded by Terry White
