= Electoral district of Redcliffe =

State electoral district of Queensland, Australia

Redcliffe Queensland—Legislative Assembly
- Electoral map of Redcliffe 2017
- State: Queensland
- MP: Kerri-Anne Dooley
- Party: Liberal National
- Namesake: Redcliffe
- Electors: 38,589 (2020)
- Area: 200 km^{2} (77.2 sq mi)
- Demographic: Outer-metropolitan
- Coordinates: 27°12′S 153°16′E
Electorates around Redcliffe:
| Moreton Bay | Moreton Bay | Coral Sea |
| Murrumba | Redcliffe | Coral Sea |
| Moreton Bay | Moreton Bay | Coral Sea |

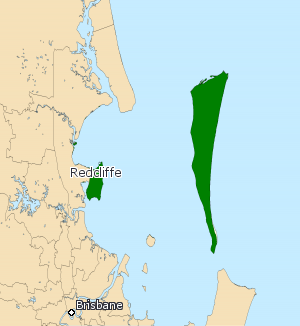
Electoral map of Redcliffe 2008

Redcliffe is a Legislative Assembly of Queensland electoral division in Brisbane, Queensland, Australia.

The division encompasses suburbs to the north and northeast of Brisbane, including Redcliffe, Woody Point, Scarborough, Clontarf and Margate, as well as parts of Kippa-Ring. The electorate's boundary stretches to take in Moreton Island.

== History ==
The seat was created in 1960 and was first held by Liberal (later National) member Jim Houghton. The seat was contested between the Liberal and National Parties until Houghton's mid-term retirement in 1979, followed by a by-election won by Liberal Terry White. White became the Liberal Party leader in August 1983, causing a split in the National-dominated coalition government. In 1989, he lost the seat to Labor Party member Ray Hollis, who at one point was Speaker of the Legislative Assembly of Queensland. In 2005, Hollis resigned and the Liberals' Terry Rogers, a local accountant, picked up the seat in a by-election upset, with an 8.4% swing. However, his tenure in the seat was short, and he lost it to Labor's Lillian van Litsenburg, a school teacher, at the 2006 state election.

Scott Driscoll, president of the United Retail Federation and a local resident born in Redcliffe, contested the seat for the Liberal National Party of Queensland at the 2012 state election, winning with a 15.67% swing. In March 2013 Premier Campbell Newman suspended Driscoll from the Liberal National Party, due to allegations that the MP had misled parliament about his business interests. The month after his suspension, Driscoll announced his resignation from the LNP, and committed to serve the remainder of his parliamentary term on the cross-bench. On 18 November 2013, the parliamentary Ethics Committee found Driscoll guilty of ethics violations and recommended his expulsion. He resigned the next day, citing ill health, though it was a near-certainty that he would have been voted out. This triggered a by-election on 22 February 2014, in which Yvette D'Ath reclaimed the seat for Labor. D'Ath formerly held the federal seat of Petrie, which is based on Redcliffe. She won 57.1% of the two-party preferred vote making it the safest ALP seat in the Queensland Parliament.

== Members for Redcliffe ==
| Member | Party | Term |
|---|---|---|
| Jim Houghton | Independent | 1960–1960 |
| Jim Houghton | Liberal | 1960–1961 |
| Jim Houghton | Independent | 1961–1962 |
| Jim Houghton | Country | 1963–1974 |
| Jim Houghton | National | 1974–1979 |
| Terry White | Liberal | 1979–1989 |
| Ray Hollis | Labor | 1989–2005 |
| Terry Rogers | Liberal | 2005–2006 |
| Lillian van Litsenburg | Labor | 2006–2012 |
| Scott Driscoll | Liberal National | 2012–2013 |
| Scott Driscoll | Independent | 2013 |
| Yvette D'Ath | Labor | 2014–2024 |
| Kerri-Anne Dooley | Liberal National | 2024–present |

== Election results ==
2024 Queensland state election: Redcliffe
| Party | Candidate | Votes | % | ±% |
|---|---|---|---|---|
| Liberal National | Kerri-Anne Dooley | 15,851 | 44.43 | +7.13 |
| Labor | Kass Hall | 12,805 | 35.89 | −11.01 |
| Greens | Will Simon | 3,257 | 9.13 | +1.93 |
| One Nation | Simon Salloum | 2,654 | 7.44 | +3.04 |
| Independent | Gerard Saunders | 1,110 | 3.11 | +3.11 |
| Total formal votes | | 35,677 | 95.94 | |
| Informal votes | | 1,508 | 4.06 | |
| Turnout | | 37,185 | 88.60 | |
Two-party-preferred result
| Liberal National | Kerri-Anne Dooley | 18,879 | 52.92 | +9.02 |
| Labor | Kass Hall | 16,798 | 47.08 | −9.02 |
| Liberal National gain from Labor | | Swing | +9.02 | |
