= Electoral district of Robina =

Robina Queensland—Legislative Assembly
- State: Queensland
- Dates current: 2001–2009
- Namesake: Robina

Robina was an electoral district of the Legislative Assembly in the Australian state of Queensland from 2001 to 2009.

The district was located in the southern part of the Gold Coast, and named for the suburb of Robina. It also included parts of the Gold Coast suburbs of Broadbeach Waters, Merrimac, Clear Island Waters, Mermaid Waters and Varsity Lakes.

The district's first member was Bob Quinn, leader of the Liberal Party from 2001 to 2006. He was succeeded by fellow Liberal Ray Stevens at the 2006 state election.

At the 2009 Queensland state election, the name Robina was discarded when most of its namesake suburb was redistributed to Mudgeeraba. The remainder of the old Robina was renamed Mermaid Beach.

== Members for Robina ==
Member	Party	Term
Bob Quinn	Liberal	2001–2006
Ray Stevens	Liberal	2006–2008
Ray Stevens	Liberal National	2008–2009

== See also ==
- Electoral districts of Queensland
- Members of the Queensland Legislative Assembly by year
- Category:Members of the Queensland Legislative Assembly by name
