= Ray Hollis =

Australian politician

The Honourable Ray Hollis

Speaker of the Queensland Legislative Assembly
- In office 28 July 1998 – 21 July 2005
- Preceded by: Neil Turner
- Succeeded by: Tony McGrady
- Constituency: Redcliffe

Member of the Queensland Legislative Assembly for Redcliffe
- In office 2 December 1989 – 21 July 2005
- Preceded by: Terry White
- Succeeded by: Terry Rogers

Personal details
- Born: Raymond Keith Hollis; 30 January 1940 London, England
- Died: 18 December 2025 (aged 85) Walcha, New South Wales, Australia
- Party: Labor
- Occupation: Transport industry

Raymond Keith Hollis (30 January 1940 – 18 December 2025) was an Australian politician. Born in London, he migrated to Australia in 1962 as a merchant seaman and worked in a variety of occupations, including a railway worker, cook, paper mill operator, insurance salesman and a position with the Victorian Corrective Services. He later owned a transport and distribution business.

As a member of the Australian Democrats, Hollis contested the 1983 and 1984 federal elections. In 1986, he joined the ALP. He was elected to the Legislative Assembly of Queensland in 1989 as the Labor member for Redcliffe. On 28 July 1998 he became Speaker of the Legislative Assembly. He held the position until 21 July 2005, when he resigned his seat, triggering a by-election.

Parliament of Queensland
Preceded by Neil Turner	Speaker of the Legislative Assembly; 1998– 2005	Succeeded by Tony McGrady
Preceded by Terry White	Member for Redcliffe; 1989–2005	Succeeded by Terry Rogers
