= Terry Rogers (Australian politician) =

Australian politician (born 1958)

Member of the Queensland Legislative Assembly for Redcliffe
- In office 20 August 2005 – 9 September 2006
- Preceded by: Ray Hollis
- Succeeded by: Lillian van Litsenburg

Personal details
- Born: Terence Walter Rogers; 26 November 1958 (age 67) Ipswich, Queensland, Australia
- Party: Liberal
- Occupation: Chartered Accountant and Bank officer

Terence Walter "Terry" Rogers (born 26 November 1958) is a former Australian politician. Born in Ipswich, he was a Chartered Accountant and bank officer before entering politics. A member of the Liberal Party, he was elected to the Queensland Legislative Assembly at the 2005 Redcliffe state by-election, following the resignation of Labor's Ray Hollis. Rogers was defeated at the 2006 state election by Labor candidate Lillian van Litsenburg.

Rogers attended school locally at Clontarf Beach State School and Clontarf Beach State High School and subsequently obtained a Bachelor of Business and a Graduate Diploma of Business from the Brisbane College of Advanced Education, now Queensland University of Technology.

He is a Fellow of the Institute of Chartered Accountants Australia & New Zealand and a Fellow of the Chartered Governance Institute of Australia.

He is the Principal of TWR Group Chartered Accountants with offices in Margate and Woolloongabba., A director of TWR Group Financial Services Pty Ltd and Australia China Freetrade Pty Ltd.

Partner Sharyn Lee Crosby (born 17 August 1967) Box Hill Victoria.

Parliament of Queensland
Preceded by Ray Hollis	Member for Redcliffe; 2005–2006	Succeeded by Lillian van Litsenburg
