= Lillian van Litsenburg =

Australian politician

Member of the Queensland Parliament for Redcliffe
- In office September 2006 – 24 March 2012
- Preceded by: Terry Rogers
- Succeeded by: Scott Driscoll

Personal details
- Born: 22 April 1957 (age 68) Eindhoven, Netherlands
- Party: Labor
- Occupation: Teacher

Elisabeth Cornelia Maria "Lillian" van Litsenburg (born 22 April 1957) was a Labor Party politician in the Queensland Parliament representing the Electoral district of Redcliffe.

She was elected in September 2006 at the state election after she unsuccessfully contested the 2005 by-election in which Terry Rogers was elected and held the seat for only a number of months after the resignation of the former Labor member and Speaker of the Queensland Parliament, Ray Hollis.

She was born in the Netherlands in 1957. Lillian is a local primary school teacher.

She was defeated by Scott Driscoll of the Liberal National Party in 2012 state election.

Parliament of Queensland
Preceded by Terry Rogers	Member for Redcliffe; 2006–2012	Succeeded by Scott Driscoll
