= Results of the 2004 Queensland state election =

Queensland state election, 7 February 2004 Legislative Assembly << 2001–2006 >>
Enrolled voters	2,400,977				
Votes cast	2,195,400		Turnout	91.44	–1.13
Informal votes	43,657		Informal	1.99	–0.30
Summary of votes by party
Party	Primary votes	%	Swing	Seats	Change
Labor	1,011,630	47.01	–1.92	63	–3
Liberal	398,147	18.50	+4.18	5	+2
National	365,005	16.96	+2.80	15	+3
Greens	145,522	6.76	+4.25	0	±0
One Nation	104,980	4.88	–3.81	1	–2
Democrats	943	0.04	–0.30	0	±0
Independent	125,516	5.83	–2.78	5	±0
Total	2,151,743			89	

This is a list of electoral district results for the Queensland 2004 election.

== Results by electoral district ==
=== Albert ===
2004 Queensland state election: Albert
Party	Candidate	Votes	%	±%
Labor	Margaret Keech	15,438	60.0	+9.4
Liberal	Corey Kolar	7,101	27.6	+14.0
One Nation	Chris Coyle	1,826	7.1	−16.7
Greens	Bill Livermore	1,364	5.3	+5.3
Total formal votes		25,729	97.4	−0.1
Informal votes		673	2.6	+0.1
Turnout		26,402	90.7	−1.5
Two-party-preferred result
Labor	Margaret Keech	16,173	67.3	+4.7
Liberal	Corey Kolar	7,869	32.7	+32.7
Labor hold		Swing	+4.7	

=== Algester ===
2004 Queensland state election: Algester
Party	Candidate	Votes	%	±%
Labor	Karen Struthers	16,102	60.9	−5.8
Liberal	Richard Bradley	7,303	27.6	+4.9
Greens	Gary Crocker	1,587	6.0	+6.0
One Nation	Dale Barnard	1,433	5.4	+5.4
Total formal votes		26,425	97.7	+0.3
Informal votes		621	2.3	−0.3
Turnout		27,046	92.5	−1.2
Two-party-preferred result
Labor	Karen Struthers	16,989	68.0	−4.6
Liberal	Richard Bradley	8,006	32.0	+4.6
Labor hold		Swing	−4.6	

=== Ashgrove ===
2004 Queensland state election: Ashgrove
Party	Candidate	Votes	%	±%
Labor	Jim Fouras	13,093	53.3	−2.2
Liberal	Terry Mendies	7,534	30.7	+1.1
Greens	Mike Stasse	3,942	16.0	+10.1
Total formal votes		24,569	98.1	−0.3
Informal votes		483	1.9	+0.3
Turnout		25,052	91.5	
Two-party-preferred result
Labor	Jim Fouras	15,049	64.7	−0.3
Liberal	Terry Mendies	8,215	35.3	+0.3
Labor hold		Swing	−0.3	

=== Aspley ===
2004 Queensland state election: Aspley
Party	Candidate	Votes	%	±%
Labor	Bonny Barry	12,682	50.3	−4.4
Liberal	Trevor Nelson-Jones	10,811	42.9	−2.4
Greens	Dennis Delalande	1,721	6.8	+6.8
Total formal votes		25,214	98.3	+1.4
Informal votes		427	1.7	−1.4
Turnout		25,641	93.3	−0.8
Two-party-preferred result
Labor	Bonny Barry	13,306	54.3	−0.4
Liberal	Trevor Nelson-Jones	11,191	45.7	+0.4
Labor hold		Swing	−0.4	

=== Barron River ===
2004 Queensland state election: Barron River
Party	Candidate	Votes	%	±%
Labor	Lesley Clark	9,849	42.3	−0.7
Liberal	Stephen Walsh	8,867	38.1	+21.9
Greens	Denis Walls	2,461	10.6	+5.1
One Nation	Peter Starr	1,576	6.8	−9.4
Independent	Andrew Ryan	545	2.3	+2.3
Total formal votes		23,298	98.1	−0.4
Informal votes		462	1.9	+0.4
Turnout		23,760	90.7	+0.2
Two-party-preferred result
Labor	Lesley Clark	11,316	53.1	−4.2
Liberal	Stephen Welsh	9,988	46.9	+46.9
Labor hold		Swing	−4.2	

=== Beaudesert ===
2004 Queensland state election: Beaudesert
Party	Candidate	Votes	%	±%
National	Kev Lingard	13,349	48.6	+16.7
Labor	Michael De Lacy	9,326	33.9	−0.2
One Nation	Lesley Millar	2,889	10.5	−19.0
Greens	Mike Beale	1,922	7.0	+7.0
Total formal votes		27,486	98.3	−0.1
Informal votes		469	1.7	+0.1
Turnout		27,955	92.8	−1.5
Two-party-preferred result
National	Kev Lingard	14,552	58.1	+6.1
Labor	Michael De Lacy	10,511	41.9	−6.1
National hold		Swing	+6.1	

=== Brisbane Central ===
2004 Queensland state election: Brisbane Central
Party	Candidate	Votes	%	±%
Labor	Peter Beattie	14,644	58.3	−6.4
Liberal	Reg Little	6,563	26.1	+5.1
Greens	Richard Nielsen	3,095	12.3	+5.4
Independent	Coral Wynter	376	1.5	+0.6
Independent	Adrian McAvoy	310	1.2	+1.2
Independent	Alan Skyring	117	0.5	−0.1
Total formal votes		25,105	98.4	+0.3
Informal votes		403	1.6	−0.3
Turnout		25,508	84.7	−3.3
Two-party-preferred result
Labor	Peter Beattie	16,221	69.6	−5.4
Liberal	Reg Little	7,093	30.4	+5.4
Labor hold		Swing	−5.4	

=== Broadwater ===
2004 Queensland state election: Broadwater
Party	Candidate	Votes	%	±%
Labor	Peta-Kaye Croft	12,493	49.3	−3.1
National	Margaret Grummitt	10,474	41.3	−6.3
One Nation	Peter Elliott	1,284	5.1	+5.1
Greens	Dean Hepburn	1,090	4.3	+4.3
Total formal votes		25,341	98.1	+2.5
Informal votes		498	1.9	−2.5
Turnout		25,839	88.9	−1.7
Two-party-preferred result
Labor	Peta-Kaye Croft	13,061	54.1	+1.7
National	Margaret Grummitt	11,099	45.9	−1.7
Labor hold		Swing	+1.7	

=== Bulimba ===
2004 Queensland state election: Bulimba
Party	Candidate	Votes	%	±%
Labor	Pat Purcell	14,031	60.8	−12.4
Liberal	Glenn Snowdon	6,484	28.1	+1.3
Greens	John Houghton	2,575	11.2	+11.2
Total formal votes		23,090	98.0	+1.5
Informal votes		461	2.0	−1.5
Turnout		23,551	90.2	−1.3
Two-party-preferred result
Labor	Pat Purcell	15,051	68.5	−4.7
Liberal	Glenn Snowdon	6,937	31.5	+4.7
Labor hold		Swing	−4.7	

=== Bundaberg ===
2004 Queensland state election: Bundaberg
Party	Candidate	Votes	%	±%
Labor	Nita Cunningham	13,104	51.2	−13.7
National	Jack Dempsey	10,410	40.7	+5.6
Greens	Peter Ryan	1,171	4.6	+4.6
Independent	Adrian Wone	905	3.5	+3.5
Total formal votes		25,590	97.9	+2.1
Informal votes		544	2.1	−2.1
Turnout		26,134	92.8	−0.9
Two-party-preferred result
Labor	Nita Cunningham	13,551	55.3	−9.6
National	Jack Dempsey	10,960	44.7	+9.6
Labor hold		Swing	−9.6	

=== Bundamba ===
2004 Queensland state election: Bundamba
Party	Candidate	Votes	%	±%
Labor	Jo-Ann Miller	14,456	63.2	−8.4
Liberal	Paul Cole	4,321	18.9	+4.0
One Nation	Mike Atkin	2,520	11.0	+11.0
Greens	Jim Prentice	1,570	6.9	−6.5
Total formal votes		22,867	97.5	+1.5
Informal votes		583	2.5	−1.5
Turnout		23,450	92.1	−1.3
Two-party-preferred result
Labor	Jo-Ann Miller	15,631	74.9	−6.0
Liberal	Paul Cole	5,241	25.1	+6.0
Labor hold		Swing	−6.0	

=== Burdekin ===
2004 Queensland state election: Burdekin
Party	Candidate	Votes	%	±%
Labor	Steve Rodgers	7,911	36.9	+0.2
National	Rosemary Menkens	7,605	35.4	+12.7
Independent	Jeff Knuth	3,265	15.2	+15.2
One Nation	Merle Poletto	1,921	8.9	−10.8
Greens	Mike Rubenach	762	3.6	+3.6
Total formal votes		21,464	98.1	−0.3
Informal votes		418	1.9	+0.3
Turnout		21,882	92.0	−0.8
Two-party-preferred result
National	Rosemary Menkens	10,478	54.4	+9.5
Labor	Steve Rodgers	8,787	45.6	−9.5
National gain from Labor		Swing	+9.5	

=== Burleigh ===
2004 Queensland state election: Burleigh
Party	Candidate	Votes	%	±%
Labor	Christine Smith	13,130	47.3	+3.0
National	Max Duncan	10,667	38.4	−0.4
Greens	Inge Light	2,386	8.6	+8.6
One Nation	Paul Lewis	1,593	5.7	−11.3
Total formal votes		27,776	97.9	+0.1
Informal votes		589	2.1	−0.1
Turnout		28,365	89.4	−1.2
Two-party-preferred result
Labor	Christine Smith	14,190	55.0	+3.2
National	Max Duncan	11,590	45.0	−3.2
Labor hold		Swing	+3.2	

=== Burnett ===
2004 Queensland state election: Burnett
Party	Candidate	Votes	%	±%
National	Rob Messenger	12,526	52.6	+4.3
Labor	Trevor Strong	11,308	47.4	−4.3
Total formal votes		23,834	97.4	+2.6
Informal votes		624	2.6	−2.6
Turnout		24,458	93.0	−0.3
National gain from Labor		Swing	+4.3	

=== Cairns ===
2004 Queensland state election: Cairns
Party	Candidate	Votes	%	±%
Labor	Desley Boyle	9,962	45.7	−5.8
Liberal	Bob Manning	8,453	38.8	+38.8
One Nation	Ian Noon	1,701	7.8	−12.5
Greens	Meredyth Woodward	1,672	7.7	+1.7
Total formal votes		21,788	97.9	−0.2
Informal votes		460	2.1	+0.2
Turnout		22,248	86.9	−1.9
Two-party-preferred result
Labor	Desley Boyle	10,949	53.9	−10.9
Liberal	Bob Manning	9,363	46.1	+46.1
Labor hold		Swing	−10.9	

=== Callide ===
2004 Queensland state election: Callide
Party	Candidate	Votes	%	±%
National	Jeff Seeney	14,458	60.4	+20.3
Labor	David Pullen	5,216	21.8	−2.0
One Nation	Jim Dwyer	4,264	17.8	−18.3
Total formal votes		23,938	98.3	−0.0
Informal votes		405	1.7	+0.0
Turnout		24,343	93.6	−0.3
Two-party-preferred result
National	Jeff Seeney	16,223	73.6	+21.3
Labor	David Pullen	5,820	26.4	+26.4
National hold		Swing	+21.3	

=== Caloundra ===
2004 Queensland state election: Caloundra
Party	Candidate	Votes	%	±%
Liberal	Mark McArdle	11,259	43.3	+4.7
Labor	Christine Anthony	10,807	41.5	+5.2
One Nation	Ian Nelson	2,021	7.8	−11.3
Greens	Tony McLeod	1,943	7.5	+7.5
Total formal votes		26,030	98.3	+0.0
Informal votes		462	1.7	−0.0
Turnout		26,492	92.0	−1.2
Two-party-preferred result
Liberal	Mark McArdle	12,397	51.3	+0.3
Labor	Christine Anthony	11,789	48.7	−0.3
Liberal hold		Swing	+0.3	

=== Capalaba ===
2004 Queensland state election: Capalaba
Party	Candidate	Votes	%	±%
Labor	Michael Choi	14,521	59.2	+15.6
Liberal	Phill Costello	7,553	30.8	+18.2
Greens	Bob Knowles	2,449	10.0	+10.0
Total formal votes		24,523	97.4	−0.1
Informal votes		650	2.6	+0.1
Turnout		25,173	93.6	−0.9
Two-party-preferred result
Labor	Michael Choi	15,172	65.2	+0.6
Liberal	Phill Costello	8,112	34.8	+34.8
Labor hold		Swing	+0.6	

=== Charters Towers ===
2004 Queensland state election: Charters Towers
Party	Candidate	Votes	%	±%
National	Shane Knuth	7,910	46.8	+12.2
Labor	Christine Scott	7,369	43.6	−0.2
One Nation	Jerry Burnett	1,635	9.7	−12.0
Total formal votes		16,914	98.8	−0.3
Informal votes		212	1.2	+0.3
Turnout		17,126	92.3	−1.4
Two-party-preferred result
National	Shane Knuth	8,481	52.7	+4.9
Labor	Christine Scott	7,608	47.3	−4.9
National gain from Labor		Swing	+4.9	

=== Chatsworth ===
2004 Queensland state election: Chatsworth
Party	Candidate	Votes	%	±%
Labor	Terry Mackenroth	15,210	56.3	−0.6
Liberal	Andrew Hatfield	9,462	35.0	+8.3
Greens	Rob Wilson	2,361	8.7	+3.3
Total formal votes		27,033	98.0	+0.0
Informal votes		544	2.0	−0.0
Turnout		27,577	93.3	−1.3
Two-party-preferred result
Labor	Terry Mackenroth	15,998	61.4	−3.7
Liberal	Andrew Hatfield	9,462	38.6	+3.7
Labor hold		Swing	−3.7	

=== Clayfield ===
2004 Queensland state election: Clayfield
Party	Candidate	Votes	%	±%
Labor	Liddy Clark	10,633	45.2	−0.7
Liberal	Sally Hannah	10,598	45.1	+2.9
Greens	Peter Thomas	1,787	7.6	+2.4
Independent	Robyn McGee	491	2.1	+2.1
Total formal votes		23,509	98.5	+0.1
Informal votes		358	1.5	−0.1
Turnout		23,867	90.3	−1.7
Two-party-preferred result
Labor	Liddy Clark	11,611	51.2	−0.8
Liberal	Sally Hannah	11,078	48.8	+0.8
Labor hold		Swing	−0.8	

=== Cleveland ===
2004 Queensland state election: Cleveland
Party	Candidate	Votes	%	±%
Labor	Darryl Briskey	13,432	53.9	−3.7
Liberal	David Fenwick	9,575	38.4	+13.4
Greens	Thomas Petitt	1,908	7.7	+7.7
Total formal votes		24,915	97.9	+0.4
Informal votes		529	2.1	−0.4
Turnout		25,444	92.1	−1.5
Two-party-preferred result
Labor	Darryl Briskey	14,115	58.7	−8.0
Liberal	David Fenwick	9,946	41.3	+8.0
Labor hold		Swing	−8.0	

=== Cook ===
2004 Queensland state election: Cook
Party	Candidate	Votes	%	±%
Labor	Jason O'Brien	7,346	42.0	−21.8
National	Graham Elmes	5,420	31.0	+15.5
Independent	Bruce Gibson	2,572	14.7	+14.7
Greens	Neville St John-Wood	1,167	6.7	+6.7
One Nation	David Ballestrin	966	5.5	−15.1
Total formal votes		17,471	98.3	+0.0
Informal votes		294	1.7	−0.0
Turnout		17,765	84.3	−2.9
Two-party-preferred result
Labor	Jason O'Brien	8,746	57.5	−15.4
National	Graham Elmes	6,477	42.5	+42.5
Labor hold		Swing	−15.4	

=== Cunningham ===
2004 Queensland state election: Cunningham
Party	Candidate	Votes	%	±%
National	Stuart Copeland	14,890	62.34	+37.46
Labor	Daniel King	6,775	28.37	+3.38
One Nation	Peter Mace	2,220	9.29	−11.27
Total formal votes		23,885	98.43	−0.26
Informal votes		381	1.57	+0.26
Turnout		24,266	92.74	−0.71
Two-party-preferred result
National	Stuart Copeland	15,746	68.93	+10.30
Labor	Daniel King	7,096	31.07	−10.30
National hold		Swing	+10.30	

=== Currumbin ===
2004 Queensland state election: Currumbin
Party	Candidate	Votes	%	±%
Liberal	Jann Stuckey	12,085	46.0	+20.4
Labor	Merri Rose	10,423	39.6	−16.8
Greens	Anja Light	2,356	9.0	+9.0
One Nation	Carol Minter	1,428	5.4	−10.2
Total formal votes		26,292	98.0	−0.3
Informal votes		526	2.0	+0.3
Turnout		26,818	90.4	−0.8
Two-party-preferred result
Liberal	Jann Stuckey	12,932	53.2	+17.7
Labor	Merri Rose	11,362	46.8	−17.7
Liberal gain from Labor		Swing	+17.7	

=== Darling Downs ===
2004 Queensland state election: Darling Downs
Party	Candidate	Votes	%	±%
National	Ray Hopper	11,671	50.5	+11.5
Labor	Annette Frizzell	5,407	23.4	+2.5
Independent	Bruce Chalmers	2,448	10.6	+10.6
One Nation	David Hoy	1,902	8.2	+8.2
Independent	Kathy Sankey	1,674	7.3	+7.3
Total formal votes		23,102	98.3	−0.0
Informal votes		410	1.7	+0.0
Turnout		23,512	94.2	−0.4
Two-party-preferred result
National	Ray Hopper	13,329	67.9	+18.9
Labor	Annette Frizzell	6,338	32.2	+32.2
National gain from Independent		Swing	N/A	

=== Everton ===
2004 Queensland state election: Everton
Party	Candidate	Votes	%	±%
Labor	Rod Welford	14,664	56.6	−6.2
Liberal	Tracy Palmer-Davis	9,076	35.0	+7.1
Greens	Debbi Stainsby	1,624	6.3	+6.3
Independent	Leo De Marchi	556	2.1	+2.1
Total formal votes		25,920	98.3	+0.3
Informal votes		438	1.7	−0.3
Turnout		26,358	93.6	−0.8
Two-party-preferred result
Labor	Rod Welford	15,367	61.6	−5.9
Liberal	Tracy Palmer-Davis	9,581	38.4	+5.9
Labor hold		Swing	−5.9	

=== Ferny Grove ===
2004 Queensland state election: Ferny Grove
Party	Candidate	Votes	%	±%
Labor	Geoff Wilson	15,323	55.6	−7.7
Liberal	Andrew Patterson	9,093	33.0	+7.0
Greens	Di Clark	3,122	11.3	+0.6
Total formal votes		27,538	98.4	+0.7
Informal votes		448	1.6	−0.7
Turnout		27,986	93.1	−1.5
Two-party-preferred result
Labor	Geoff Wilson	16,559	63.2	−7.3
Liberal	Andrew Patterson	9,657	36.8	+7.3
Labor hold		Swing	−7.3	

=== Fitzroy ===
2004 Queensland state election: Fitzroy
Party	Candidate	Votes	%	±%
Labor	Jim Pearce	13,279	62.4	−0.4
National	John Engwicht	8,019	37.6	+9.1
Total formal votes		21,298	98.1	−0.3
Informal votes		420	1.9	+0.3
Turnout		21,718	92.7	−1.2
Labor hold		Swing	−4.8	

=== Gaven ===
2004 Queensland state election: Gaven
Party	Candidate	Votes	%	±%
Labor	Robert Poole	12,102	47.3	+0.9
Liberal	Ray Stevens	9,898	38.7	+38.7
Greens	Sally Spain	2,093	8.2	−0.4
Independent	Phil Connolly	1,477	5.8	−3.0
Total formal votes		25,570	97.1	+0.6
Informal votes		765	2.9	−0.6
Turnout		26,335	90.7	−0.6
Two-party-preferred result
Labor	Robert Poole	12,876	55.0	−2.6
Liberal	Ray Stevens	10,551	45.0	+45.0
Labor hold		Swing	−2.6	

=== Gladstone ===
2004 Queensland state election: Gladstone
Party	Candidate	Votes	%	±%
Independent	Liz Cunningham	14,057	55.3	+4.6
Labor	Julianne Grice	9,471	37.3	−7.8
National	John Todd	1,881	7.4	+5.1
Total formal votes		25,409	98.3	−0.5
Informal votes		426	1.7	+0.5
Turnout		25,835	93.6	−0.8
Two-candidate-preferred result
Independent	Liz Cunningham	15,248	61.2	+7.7
Labor	Julianne Grice	9,648	38.8	−7.7
Independent hold		Swing	+7.7	

=== Glass House ===
2004 Queensland state election: Glass House
Party	Candidate	Votes	%	±%
Labor	Carolyn Male	13,003	48.8	+8.0
National	John Longhurst	8,907	33.4	+15.4
One Nation	Santo Ferraro	2,481	9.3	−11.1
Greens	Eve Scopes	2,250	8.4	+1.8
Total formal votes		26,641	98.0	−0.2
Informal votes		551	2.0	+0.2
Turnout		27,192	92.4	−1.1
Two-party-preferred result
Labor	Carolyn Male	14,540	58.9	−0.7
National	John Longhurst	10,128	41.1	+0.7
Labor hold		Swing	−0.7	

=== Greenslopes ===
2004 Queensland state election: Greenslopes
Party	Candidate	Votes	%	±%
Labor	Gary Fenlon	13,011	52.7	−2.7
Liberal	Natalie Garratt	8,460	34.2	+3.4
Greens	Darryl Rosin	2,375	9.6	−0.4
Independent	Warren Simondson	855	3.5	+3.5
Total formal votes		24,701	98.4	+0.4
Informal votes		398	1.6	−0.4
Turnout		25,099	91.5	−1.1
Two-party-preferred result
Labor	Gary Fenlon	14,064	61.0	−3.1
Liberal	Natalie Garratt	8,981	39.0	+3.1
Labor hold		Swing	−3.1	

=== Gregory ===
2004 Queensland state election: Gregory
Party	Candidate	Votes	%	±%
National	Vaughan Johnson	10,674	62.0	+2.7
Labor	Shane Guley	5,204	30.2	−10.5
One Nation	Ian Espie	1,334	7.8	+7.8
Total formal votes		17,212	98.4	+1.1
Informal votes		286	1.6	−1.1
Turnout		17,498	91.8	−1.2
Two-party-preferred result
National	Vaughan Johnson	11,155	67.4	+8.1
Labor	Shane Guley	5,404	32.6	−8.1
National hold		Swing	+8.1	

=== Gympie ===
2004 Queensland state election: Gympie
Party	Candidate	Votes	%	±%
Independent	Elisa Roberts	9,031	33.4	+33.4
Labor	Rae Gate	6,946	25.7	−7.7
National	Christian Rowan	6,718	24.9	+0.2
Independent	Wayne Sachs	1,675	6.2	+6.2
One Nation	Colin Bailey	1,508	5.6	−20.1
Greens	Glenda Stasse	1,049	3.9	+3.9
Independent	Martin Poole	77	0.3	+0.3
Total formal votes		27,004	98.5	+0.0
Informal votes		414	1.5	−0.0
Turnout		27,418	92.8	−0.9
Two-candidate-preferred result
Independent	Elisa Roberts	12,285	60.1	+60.1
Labor	Rae Gate	8,172	39.9	−6.8
Independent gain from One Nation		Swing	N/A	

=== Hervey Bay ===
2004 Queensland state election: Hervey Bay
Party	Candidate	Votes	%	±%
Labor	Andrew McNamara	11,610	45.1	+2.4
National	Bernie Martin	9,257	35.9	+18.7
Independent	David Dalgleish	3,250	12.6	+12.6
Greens	Jacqueline Goodfellow	1,435	5.6	+5.6
Independent	Glen Poulton	219	0.8	+0.8
Total formal votes		25,771	98.1	−0.3
Informal votes		502	1.9	+0.3
Turnout		26,273	92.9	−1.0
Two-party-preferred result
Labor	Andrew McNamara	12,395	54.0	−3.6
National	Bernie Martin	10,575	46.0	+46.0
Labor hold		Swing	−3.6	

=== Hinchinbrook ===
2004 Queensland state election: Hinchinbrook
Party	Candidate	Votes	%	±%
National	Marc Rowell	8,619	41.8	+13.0
Labor	Guni Liepins	4,982	24.2	−1.9
Independent	Andrew Lancini	4,419	21.4	+4.0
One Nation	Trevor Mitchell	2,602	12.6	−13.8
Total formal votes		20,622	98.2	−0.0
Informal votes		374	1.8	+0.0
Turnout		20,996	92.8	−0.3
Two-candidate-preferred result
National	Marc Rowell	9,824	60.9	+8.1
Independent	Andrew Lancini	6,312	39.1	+39.1
National hold		Swing	+8.1	

=== Inala ===
2004 Queensland state election: Inala
Party	Candidate	Votes	%	±%
Labor	Henry Palaszczuk	14,865	68.2	+0.1
Liberal	Christopher Cramond	2,911	13.3	+3.0
One Nation	George Pugh	2,107	9.7	+9.7
Greens	Nigel Quinlan	1,296	5.9	+5.9
Independent	Adrian Skerritt	633	2.9	+2.9
Total formal votes		21,812	97.3	−0.2
Informal votes		611	2.7	+0.2
Turnout		22,423	91.1	−2.4
Two-party-preferred result
Labor	Henry Palaszczuk	16,192	81.0	+9.5
Liberal	Christopher Cramond	3,793	19.0	+19.0
Labor hold		Swing	+9.5	

=== Indooroopilly ===
2004 Queensland state election: Indooroopilly
Party	Candidate	Votes	%	±%
Liberal	Allan Pidgeon	9,888	43.0	+5.8
Labor	Ronan Lee	9,419	40.9	+2.2
Greens	Chris Head	3,334	14.5	+4.4
One Nation	John Drew	364	1.6	−2.2
Total formal votes		23,005	98.9	+0.0
Informal votes		255	1.1	−0.0
Turnout		23,260	89.5	−0.8
Two-party-preferred result
Labor	Ronan Lee	11,480	52.1	−0.8
Liberal	Allan Pidgeon	10,564	47.9	+0.8
Labor hold		Swing	−0.8	

=== Ipswich ===
2004 Queensland state election: Ipswich
Party	Candidate	Votes	%	±%
Labor	Rachel Nolan	15,775	64.2	+14.4
Liberal	Bob Harper	6,247	25.4	+14.7
Greens	Clare Rudkin	1,590	6.5	+3.9
Independent	Colene Hughes	947	3.9	+3.9
Total formal votes		24,559	97.9	−0.5
Informal votes		530	2.1	+0.5
Turnout		25,089	93.3	−1.0
Two-party-preferred result
Labor	Rachel Nolan	16,326	71.0	+4.2
Liberal	Bob Harper	6,668	29.0	+29.0
Labor hold		Swing	+4.2	

=== Ipswich West ===
2004 Queensland state election: Ipswich West
Party	Candidate	Votes	%	±%
Labor	Don Livingstone	11,720	49.0	+3.1
Liberal	Jean Bray	7,536	31.5	+31.5
One Nation	Alan Price	3,090	12.9	−12.7
Greens	Sarai O'Reilly-Reis	1,134	4.7	+0.4
Independent	Michael Ward	449	1.9	+1.9
Total formal votes		23,929	98.0	−0.4
Informal votes		481	2.0	+0.4
Turnout		24,410	93.2	−1.5
Two-party-preferred result
Labor	Don Livingstone	12,678	59.4	+2.1
Liberal	Jean Bray	8,661	40.6	+40.6
Labor hold		Swing	+2.1	

=== Kallangur ===
2004 Queensland state election: Kallangur
Party	Candidate	Votes	%	±%
Labor	Ken Hayward	13,099	51.9	−6.4
National	Fay Driscoll	6,688	26.5	+26.5
One Nation	Howard Shepherd	3,275	13.0	+13.0
Greens	Suzi Tooke	2,160	8.6	+1.3
Total formal votes		25,222	97.5	+0.2
Informal votes		638	2.5	−0.2
Turnout		25,860	92.8	−0.9
Two-party-preferred result
Labor	Ken Hayward	14,265	63.7	−7.7
National	Fay Driscoll	8,143	36.3	+36.3
Labor hold		Swing	−7.7	

=== Kawana ===
2004 Queensland state election: Kawana
Party	Candidate	Votes	%	±%
Labor	Chris Cummins	12,570	44.3	+1.8
Liberal	Harry Burnett	11,934	42.0	+3.6
One Nation	Paul Westbury	2,060	7.3	−11.8
Greens	Susan McLeod	1,826	6.4	+6.4
Total formal votes		28,390	98.3	+0.3
Informal votes		495	1.7	−0.3
Turnout		28,885	91.9	−1.2
Two-party-preferred result
Labor	Chris Cummins	13,737	51.5	−1.1
Liberal	Harry Burnett	12,949	48.5	+1.1
Labor hold		Swing	−1.1	

=== Keppel ===
2004 Queensland state election: Keppel
Party	Candidate	Votes	%	±%
Labor	Paul Hoolihan	10,632	46.5	+3.5
National	Neil Fisher	8,771	38.4	−4.6
One Nation	Herb Clarke	1,822	8.0	+8.0
Democrats	Naomi Johns	943	4.1	+4.1
Independent	John Murphy	377	1.6	+1.6
Independent	Bruce Piggott	308	1.3	+1.3
Total formal votes		22,853	98.1	−0.1
Informal votes		447	1.9	+0.1
Turnout		23,300	92.1	−0.9
Two-party-preferred result
Labor	Paul Hoolihan	11,292	53.8	+5.3
National	Neil Fisher	9,706	46.2	−5.3
Labor gain from National		Swing	+5.3	

=== Kurwongbah ===
2004 Queensland state election: Kurwongbah
Party	Candidate	Votes	%	±%
Labor	Linda Lavarch	16,148	54.6	−8.4
National	Terry Orreal	9,323	31.5	+31.5
Greens	Daniel Boon	2,245	7.6	+1.0
One Nation	Dean Westbury	1,184	4.0	+4.0
Independent	Connie Wood	701	2.4	+2.4
Total formal votes		29,601	98.2	+0.6
Informal votes		554	1.8	−0.6
Turnout		30,155	93.6	−0.8
Two-party-preferred result
Labor	Linda Lavarch	17,128	62.5	−10.2
National	Terry Orreal	10,299	37.5	+37.5
Labor hold		Swing	−10.2	

=== Lockyer ===
2004 Queensland state election: Lockyer
Party	Candidate	Votes	%	±%
National	Ian Rickuss	8,675	34.8	+17.9
Labor	John Kelly	7,897	31.7	+4.2
One Nation	Bill Flynn	5,110	20.5	−7.8
Independent	Peter Prenzler	2,080	8.4	+8.4
Greens	Marie Johnston	1,132	4.5	+1.7
Total formal votes		24,894	97.8	−0.4
Informal votes		564	2.2	+0.4
Turnout		25,458	93.1	−1.4
Two-party-preferred result
National	Ian Rickuss	10,914	54.1	+54.1
Labor	John Kelly	9,252	45.9	+3.2
National gain from One Nation		Swing	N/A	

=== Logan ===
2004 Queensland state election: Logan
Party	Candidate	Votes	%	±%
Labor	John Mickel	15,114	63.8	−8.5
National	Joy Drescher	5,799	24.5	−3.2
Greens	Eileen Brown	2,083	8.8	+8.8
Independent	Ron Frood	699	2.9	+2.9
Total formal votes		23,695	96.9	+2.5
Informal votes		746	3.1	−2.5
Turnout		24,441	91.6	−1.0
Two-party-preferred result
Labor	John Mickel	15,733	71.2	−1.1
National	Joy Drescher	6,349	28.8	+1.1
Labor hold		Swing	−1.1	

=== Lytton ===
2004 Queensland state election: Lytton
Party	Candidate	Votes	%	±%
Labor	Paul Lucas	15,128	61.8	−5.1
Liberal	Glenn Weymouth	7,104	29.0	+7.1
Greens	Panche Hadzi-Andonov	2,242	9.2	−2.0
Total formal votes		24,474	97.9	+0.7
Informal votes		527	2.1	−0.7
Turnout		25,001	93.2	−1.5
Two-party-preferred result
Labor	Paul Lucas	15,958	67.9	−6.5
Liberal	Glenn Weymouth	7,553	32.1	+6.5
Labor hold		Swing	−6.5	

=== Mackay ===
2004 Queensland state election: Mackay
Party	Candidate	Votes	%	±%
Labor	Tim Mulherin	13,824	55.9	−2.8
National	Craig Joy	6,603	26.7	−4.6
One Nation	John Bonaventura	2,511	10.2	+10.2
Greens	Jen Hayward	1,780	7.2	+7.2
Total formal votes		24,718	98.0	+0.3
Informal votes		509	2.0	−0.3
Turnout		25,227	91.3	−0.5
Two-party-preferred result
Labor	Tim Mulherin	14,816	65.8	+2.3
National	Craig Joy	7,703	34.2	−2.3
Labor hold		Swing	+2.3	

=== Mansfield ===
2004 Queensland state election: Mansfield
Party	Candidate	Votes	%	±%
Labor	Phil Reeves	13,368	53.9	+0.5
Liberal	John Olive	9,535	38.5	+3.8
Greens	Jan McNicol	1,894	7.6	+7.6
Total formal votes		24,797	98.1	−0.1
Informal votes		489	1.9	+0.1
Turnout		25,286	92.9	−1.0
Two-party-preferred result
Labor	Phil Reeves	14,067	58.6	+0.0
Liberal	John Olive	9,955	41.4	-0.0
Labor hold		Swing	+0.0	

=== Maroochydore ===
2004 Queensland state election: Maroochydore
Party	Candidate	Votes	%	±%
National	Fiona Simpson	11,720	46.0	+6.2
Labor	Debbie Blumel	9,626	37.8	−3.3
Greens	Lindsay Holt	2,023	7.9	+7.9
One Nation	Patrick Rozanski	1,183	4.6	−14.5
Independent	Anita Gordon	907	3.6	+3.6
Total formal votes		25,459	98.3	+0.3
Informal votes		449	1.7	−0.3
Turnout		25,908	89.3	−0.7
Two-party-preferred result
National	Fiona Simpson	12,703	54.1	+3.3
Labor	Debbie Blumel	10,794	45.9	−3.3
National hold		Swing	+3.3	

=== Maryborough ===
2004 Queensland state election: Maryborough
Party	Candidate	Votes	%	±%
Independent	Chris Foley	16,314	64.9	+64.9
Labor	Doug Loggie	7,556	30.1	−11.9
Greens	Stephen Walker	1,271	5.1	+5.1
Total formal votes		25,141	97.8	+0.2
Informal votes		572	2.2	−0.2
Turnout		25,713	94.2	−0.9
Two-candidate-preferred result
Independent	Chris Foley	16,664	68.0	+68.0
Labor	Doug Loggie	7,849	32.0	−17.5
Independent hold		Swing	+68.0	

=== Mirani ===
2004 Queensland state election: Mirani
Party	Candidate	Votes	%	±%
National	Ted Malone	11,733	51.3	+16.4
Labor	Mark D'Elboux	7,955	34.8	+1.6
One Nation	Rob Robinson	2,434	10.6	−10.9
Independent	Ed Vaughan	741	3.2	−0.1
Total formal votes		22,863	98.3	−0.3
Informal votes		393	1.7	+0.4
Turnout		23,256	93.3	−1.0
Two-party-preferred result
National	Ted Malone	12,958	60.6	+6.8
Labor	Mark D'Elboux	8,409	39.4	−6.8
National hold		Swing	+6.8	

=== Moggill ===
2004 Queensland state election: Moggill
Party	Candidate	Votes	%	±%
Liberal	Bruce Flegg	13,255	52.1	+11.7
Labor	Lisa Rayner	9,075	35.6	−2.9
Greens	Lenore Taylor	3,133	12.3	+5.9
Total formal votes		25,463	98.8	+0.3
Informal votes		317	1.2	−0.3
Turnout		25,780	92.6	−0.3
Two-party-preferred result
Liberal	Bruce Flegg	13,867	56.3	+5.4
Labor	Lisa Rayner	10,749	43.7	−5.4
Liberal hold		Swing	+5.4	

=== Mount Coot-tha ===
2004 Queensland state election: Mount Coot-tha
Party	Candidate	Votes	%	±%
Labor	Andrew Fraser	10,457	44.2	−6.8
Liberal	Ray Sargent	7,112	30.1	+3.5
Greens	Andrew Carroll	5,568	23.6	+11.7
Independent	Dave Noke	505	2.1	+2.1
Total formal votes		23,642	98.7	+0.2
Informal votes		319	1.3	−0.2
Turnout		23,961	86.5	−2.2
Two-party-preferred result
Labor	Andrew Fraser	13,170	61.5	−4.6
Liberal	Ray Sargent	8,229	38.5	+4.6
Labor hold		Swing	−4.6	

=== Mount Gravatt ===
2004 Queensland state election: Mount Gravatt
Party	Candidate	Votes	%	±%
Labor	Judy Spence	13,317	56.5	+1.9
Liberal	Richard Leworthy	8,418	35.7	+8.7
One Nation	Karen Bracken	963	4.1	−5.2
Independent	J.F. Barnes	892	3.8	+3.8
Total formal votes		23,590	97.9	−0.1
Informal votes		507	2.1	+0.1
Turnout		24,097	91.5	−2.3
Two-party-preferred result
Labor	Judy Spence	13,688	60.3	−3.8
Liberal	Richard Leworthy	9,004	39.7	+3.8
Labor hold		Swing	−3.8	

=== Mount Isa ===
2004 Queensland state election: Mount Isa
Party	Candidate	Votes	%	±%
Labor	Tony McGrady	8,898	61.8	+4.2
National	Alan Dredge	4,859	33.7	+13.0
Greens	Nick Harris	652	4.5	+4.5
Total formal votes		14,409	98.1	−0.5
Informal votes		274	1.9	+0.5
Turnout		14,683	86.7	−2.0
Two-party-preferred result
Labor	Tony McGrady	9,077	64.2	−2.0
National	Alan Dredge	5,072	35.8	+35.8
Labor hold		Swing	−2.0	

=== Mount Ommaney ===
2004 Queensland state election: Mount Ommaney
Party	Candidate	Votes	%	±%
Labor	Julie Attwood	13,756	55.4	+3.4
Liberal	Keith Hamilton	8,840	35.6	+15.9
Greens	Clive Brazier	1,826	7.3	+2.5
Independent	Wayne Kirk	429	1.7	+1.7
Total formal votes		24,851	98.7	+0.0
Informal votes		327	1.3	−0.0
Turnout		25,178	92.7	−0.1
Two-party-preferred result
Labor	Julie Attwood	14,921	61.6	+2.9
Liberal	Keith Hamilton	9,290	38.4	+38.4
Labor hold		Swing	+2.9	

=== Mudgeeraba ===
2004 Queensland state election: Mudgeeraba
Party	Candidate	Votes	%	±%
Labor	Dianne Reilly	10,994	44.5	+3.2
Liberal	Scott Paterson	10,386	42.1	+11.5
Greens	Nicole Chegwyn	1,880	7.6	−1.3
One Nation	Steve Moir	1,075	4.4	+4.4
Independent	Gary Pead	348	1.4	+1.4
Total formal votes		24,683	97.7	+0.9
Informal votes		577	2.3	−0.9
Turnout		25,260	89.4	−1.7
Two-party-preferred result
Labor	Dianne Reilly	11,864	51.9	−4.9
Liberal	Scott Paterson	11,017	48.1	+4.9
Labor hold		Swing	−4.9	

=== Mulgrave ===
2004 Queensland state election: Mulgrave
Party	Candidate	Votes	%	±%
Labor	Warren Pitt	11,926	51.4	−2.2
National	Desley Vella	8,043	34.6	+14.6
One Nation	Arietta Mitchell	2,654	11.4	−14.9
Independent	Dominic Frisone	590	2.5	+2.5
Total formal votes		23,213	98.0	−0.3
Informal votes		474	2.0	+0.3
Turnout		23,687	91.6	−0.5
Two-party-preferred result
Labor	Warren Pitt	12,441	57.7	−3.6
National	Desley Vella	9,113	42.3	+42.3
Labor hold		Swing	−3.6	

=== Mundingburra ===
2004 Queensland state election: Mundingburra
Party	Candidate	Votes	%	±%
Labor	Lindy Nelson-Carr	11,099	45.8	−3.1
Liberal	Steve Hawker	7,906	32.6	+4.1
Greens	Matt Grantham	1,958	8.1	+4.3
One Nation	John Weil	1,850	7.6	−9.4
Independent	Sandra Hubert	1,403	5.8	+5.8
Total formal votes		24,216	97.9	−0.1
Informal votes		519	2.1	+0.1
Turnout		24,735	90.4	−1.1
Two-party-preferred result
Labor	Lindy Nelson-Carr	12,314	56.2	−5.2
Liberal	Steve Hawker	9,590	43.8	+5.2
Labor hold		Swing	−5.2	

=== Murrumba ===
2004 Queensland state election: Murrumba
Party	Candidate	Votes	%	±%
Labor	Dean Wells	15,922	57.2	−5.3
Liberal	Susan Haskell	9,247	33.2	+14.3
Greens	Rick Pass	2,669	9.6	+9.6
Total formal votes		27,838	97.5	+0.1
Informal votes		699	2.5	−0.1
Turnout		28,537	93.1	−1.1
Two-party-preferred result
Labor	Dean Wells	16,548	62.7	−8.4
Liberal	Susan Haskell	9,848	37.3	+8.4
Labor hold		Swing	−8.4	

=== Nanango ===
2004 Queensland state election: Nanango
Party	Candidate	Votes	%	±%
Independent	Dorothy Pratt	9,989	45.7	−0.5
National	Nina Temperton	6,017	27.5	+1.7
Labor	Nick Holliday	3,667	16.8	−11.3
One Nation	Bob Gold	1,550	7.1	+7.1
Greens	Desiree Mahoney	646	3.0	+3.0
Total formal votes		21,869	98.3	+0.4
Informal votes		368	1.7	−0.4
Turnout		22,237	93.1	−1.2
Two-candidate-preferred result
Independent	Dorothy Pratt	11,553	62.7	−4.4
National	Nina Temperton	6,864	37.3	+37.3
Independent hold		Swing	−4.4	

=== Nicklin ===
2004 Queensland state election: Nicklin
Party	Candidate	Votes	%	±%
Independent	Peter Wellington	15,617	59.5	+13.2
Labor	Linda Hanson	4,131	15.7	−1.2
National	Leo Woodward	3,762	14.3	+6.5
Greens	Robert Winny	1,373	5.2	+1.5
One Nation	Clinton Booth	1,354	5.2	−10.8
Total formal votes		26,237	98.6	−0.2
Informal votes		362	1.4	+0.2
Turnout		26,599	91.6	−1.1
Two-candidate-preferred result
Independent	Peter Wellington	18,447	79.6	+6.2
Labor	Linda Hanson	4,741	20.4	+20.4
Independent hold		Swing	+6.2	

=== Noosa ===
2004 Queensland state election: Noosa
Party	Candidate	Votes	%	±%
Labor	Cate Molloy	13,702	48.4	+6.4
Liberal	Glen Elmes	9,969	35.2	−5.1
Greens	Jennie Harvie	2,893	10.2	+10.2
One Nation	Ernest Lake	1,718	6.1	−11.5
Total formal votes		28,282	98.5	+0.4
Informal votes		438	1.5	−0.4
Turnout		28,720	90.4	−0.9
Two-party-preferred result
Labor	Cate Molloy	15,329	58.7	+7.8
Liberal	Glen Elmes	10,802	41.3	−7.8
Labor hold		Swing	+7.8	

=== Nudgee ===
2004 Queensland state election: Nudgee
Party	Candidate	Votes	%	±%
Labor	Neil Roberts	15,421	63.4	−11.7
Liberal	Lorne Thurgar	6,725	27.7	+2.8
Greens	Mark Carey-Smith	2,167	8.9	+8.9
Total formal votes		24,313	98.1	+1.6
Informal votes		464	1.9	−1.6
Turnout		24,777	92.2	−1.5
Two-party-preferred result
Labor	Neil Roberts	16,182	69.3	−5.8
Liberal	Lorne Thurgar	7,160	30.7	+5.8
Labor hold		Swing	−5.8	

=== Pumicestone ===
2004 Queensland state election: Pumicestone
Party	Candidate	Votes	%	±%
Labor	Carryn Sullivan	12,778	47.9	+1.6
Liberal	Pat Daly	9,803	36.8	+19.0
One Nation	Thomas Hobbins	2,564	9.6	−6.5
Greens	Lyn Dickinson	1,513	5.7	+3.2
Total formal votes		26,658	97.9	−0.3
Informal votes		558	2.1	+0.3
Turnout		27,216	92.4	−1.4
Two-party-preferred result
Labor	Carryn Sullivan	13,612	55.4	−10.7
Liberal	Pat Daly	10,945	44.6	+10.7
Labor hold		Swing	−10.7	

=== Redcliffe ===
2004 Queensland state election: Redcliffe
Party	Candidate	Votes	%	±%
Labor	Ray Hollis	12,062	50.1	−6.5
Liberal	Terry Rogers	8,582	35.6	+12.2
Independent	Rob McJannett	3,441	14.3	+14.3
Total formal votes		24,085	97.7	+0.1
Informal votes		578	2.3	−0.1
Turnout		24,663	92.7	−0.2
Two-party-preferred result
Labor	Ray Hollis	12,668	57.1	−10.5
Liberal	Terry Rogers	9,518	42.9	+10.5
Labor hold		Swing	−10.5	

=== Redlands ===
2004 Queensland state election: Redlands
Party	Candidate	Votes	%	±%
Labor	John English	13,320	53.4	+4.8
National	John Hegarty	9,137	36.7	+7.5
One Nation	John Walter	1,258	5.0	+5.0
Greens	Lyndon Harris	1,215	4.9	+4.9
Total formal votes		24,930	98.2	+0.9
Informal votes		467	1.8	−0.9
Turnout		25,397	93.2	−1.1
Two-party-preferred result
Labor	John English	13,900	58.5	+1.6
National	John Hegarty	9,876	41.5	−1.6
Labor hold		Swing	+1.6	

=== Robina ===
2004 Queensland state election: Robina
Party	Candidate	Votes	%	±%
Liberal	Bob Quinn	14,275	55.0	+0.9
Labor	Bruce Simmonds	9,684	37.3	−8.7
Greens	Kelly Houston	2,020	7.8	+7.8
Total formal votes		25,979	97.7	+2.4
Informal votes		615	2.3	−2.4
Turnout		26,594	88.5	−1.6
Two-party-preferred result
Liberal	Bob Quinn	14,611	58.8	+4.8
Labor	Bruce Simmonds	10,247	41.2	−4.8
Liberal hold		Swing	+4.8	

=== Rockhampton ===
2004 Queensland state election: Rockhampton
Party	Candidate	Votes	%	±%
Labor	Robert Schwarten	15,539	69.0	−0.1
National	Pamela Olive	6,997	31.0	+9.1
Total formal votes		22,536	97.4	−0.1
Informal votes		589	2.6	+0.1
Turnout		23,125	92.8	−0.6
Labor hold		Swing	−5.2	

=== Sandgate ===
2004 Queensland state election: Sandgate
Party	Candidate	Votes	%	±%
Labor	Gordon Nuttall	13,235	54.2	−12.6
Liberal	Luke Howarth	7,381	30.2	+10.1
Greens	Susan Black	3,253	13.3	+13.3
Independent	Ron Eaton	279	1.1	−12.0
Independent	Rod McDonough	259	1.1	+1.1
Total formal votes		24,407	98.0	+0.3
Informal votes		505	2.0	−0.3
Turnout		24,912	92.8	−1.3
Two-party-preferred result
Labor	Gordon Nuttall	14,258	64.0	−10.5
Liberal	Luke Howarth	8,022	36.0	+10.5
Labor hold		Swing	−10.5	

=== South Brisbane ===
2004 Queensland state election: South Brisbane
Party	Candidate	Votes	%	±%
Labor	Anna Bligh	12,848	53.1	−6.8
Liberal	Alister Cowper	5,839	24.1	+4.4
Greens	Juanita Wheeler	4,847	20.0	+11.0
Independent	Lynda Hansen	680	2.8	+2.8
Total formal votes		24,214	97.8	+0.4
Informal votes		552	2.2	−0.4
Turnout		24,766	85.7	−2.9
Two-party-preferred result
Labor	Anna Bligh	16,150	71.1	−3.8
Liberal	Alister Cowper	6,577	28.9	+3.8
Labor hold		Swing	−3.8	

=== Southern Downs ===
2004 Queensland state election: Southern Downs
Party	Candidate	Votes	%	±%
National	Lawrence Springborg	17,775	69.7	+18.1
Labor	Leanne King	5,523	21.6	−3.9
One Nation	John Coyle	1,349	5.3	+5.3
Greens	Jonathan Rihan	866	3.4	+3.4
Total formal votes		25,513	98.2	+0.0
Informal votes		460	1.8	−0.0
Turnout		25,973	93.2	−0.5
Two-party-preferred result
National	Lawrence Springborg	18,435	75.2	+8.4
Labor	Leanne King	6,074	24.8	−8.4
National hold		Swing	+8.4	

=== Southport ===
2004 Queensland state election: Southport
Party	Candidate	Votes	%	±%
Labor	Peter Lawlor	13,106	54.1	+3.2
National	Bob Bennett	8,546	35.3	+6.2
Greens	Ian Latto	1,549	6.4	+6.4
One Nation	Ron Williams	1,006	4.2	−11.0
Total formal votes		24,207	97.5	−0.1
Informal votes		614	2.5	+0.1
Turnout		24,821	88.6	−1.6
Two-party-preferred result
Labor	Peter Lawlor	13,720	60.0	−0.8
National	Bob Bennett	9,152	40.0	+0.8
Labor hold		Swing	−0.8	

=== Springwood ===
2004 Queensland state election: Springwood
Party	Candidate	Votes	%	±%
Labor	Barbara Stone	13,288	54.9	+9.3
National	Andrea Ross	8,930	36.9	+18.1
Greens	John Reddington	2,000	8.3	+8.3
Total formal votes		24,218	97.9	+0.4
Informal votes		515	2.1	−0.4
Turnout		24,733	92.1	−0.6
Two-party-preferred result
Labor	Barbara Stone	13,909	59.7	−0.7
National	Andrea Ross	9,381	40.3	+0.7
Labor hold		Swing	−0.7	

=== Stafford ===
2004 Queensland state election: Stafford
Party	Candidate	Votes	%	±%
Labor	Terry Sullivan	14,262	59.1	−6.3
Liberal	Christopher Kelly	7,207	29.9	+5.7
Greens	Sue Meehan	2,665	11.0	+0.5
Total formal votes		24,134	98.0	+0.3
Informal votes		482	2.0	−0.3
Turnout		24,616	91.6	−1.7
Two-party-preferred result
Labor	Terry Sullivan	15,274	66.3	−6.1
Liberal	Christopher Kelly	7,751	33.7	+6.1
Labor hold		Swing	−6.1	

=== Stretton ===
2004 Queensland state election: Stretton
Party	Candidate	Votes	%	±%
Labor	Stephen Robertson	15,866	59.9	−2.8
Liberal	Paul Wood	8,522	32.2	−5.1
Greens	Stan Cajdler	2,110	8.0	+8.0
Total formal votes		26,498	98.0	+1.7
Informal votes		527	2.0	−1.7
Turnout		27,025	90.7	−1.3
Two-party-preferred result
Labor	Stephen Robertson	16,601	65.0	+2.3
Liberal	Paul Wood	8,925	35.0	−2.3
Labor hold		Swing	+2.3	

=== Surfers Paradise ===
2004 Queensland state election: Surfers Paradise
Party	Candidate	Votes	%	±%
Liberal	John-Paul Langbroek	11,348	44.7	+44.7
Labor	David Parrish	6,462	25.5	−12.8
Independent	Lex Bell	5,810	22.9	+22.9
Greens	Graham Lapthorne	1,760	6.9	−5.1
Total formal votes		25,380	97.7	+0.8
Informal votes		602	2.3	−0.8
Turnout		25,982	86.6	−1.6
Two-party-preferred result
Liberal	John-Paul Langbroek	13,014	63.9	+63.9
Labor	David Parrish	7,350	36.1	−8.6
Liberal gain from Independent		Swing	N/A	

=== Tablelands ===
2004 Queensland state election: Tablelands
Party	Candidate	Votes	%	±%
One Nation	Rosa Lee Long	10,140	47.0	+11.0
National	Cheryl Tonkin	5,730	26.5	+10.1
Labor	Arthur Yates	5,721	26.5	+1.7
Total formal votes		21,591	98.0	−0.6
Informal votes		443	2.0	+0.6
Turnout		22,034	91.7	−1.2
Two-candidate-preferred result
One Nation	Rosa Lee Long	10,955	62.4	−1.4
National	Cheryl Tonkin	6,598	37.6	+37.6
One Nation hold		Swing	−1.4	

=== Thuringowa ===
2004 Queensland state election: Thuringowa
Party	Candidate	Votes	%	±%
Labor	Craig Wallace	11,647	44.8	+3.8
National	Sandra Chesney	6,635	25.5	+6.8
Independent	David Moyle	3,338	12.8	+12.8
One Nation	Bill Hankin	2,550	9.8	+9.8
Greens	Meg Davis	1,491	5.7	+5.7
Independent	John Ryan	350	1.3	+1.3
Total formal votes		26,011	97.2	−0.3
Informal votes		755	2.8	+0.3
Turnout		26,766	92.1	−0.9
Two-party-preferred result
Labor	Craig Wallace	12,982	57.9	+4.3
National	Sandra Chesney	9,441	42.1	+42.1
Labor hold		Swing	+4.3	

=== Toowoomba North ===
2004 Queensland state election: Toowoomba North
Party	Candidate	Votes	%	±%
Labor	Kerry Shine	11,785	52.2	+8.1
National	Ian Douglas	8,567	37.9	−1.8
Greens	Michael Kane	1,162	5.1	+5.1
One Nation	Sean Rycard	1,083	4.8	+4.8
Total formal votes		22,597	98.4	+0.7
Informal votes		358	1.6	−0.7
Turnout		22,955	92.2	−1.0
Two-party-preferred result
Labor	Kerry Shine	12,388	57.3	+5.4
National	Ian Douglas	9,235	42.7	−5.4
Labor hold		Swing	+5.4	

=== Toowoomba South ===
2004 Queensland state election: Toowoomba South
Party	Candidate	Votes	%	±%
National	Mike Horan	12,229	52.9	+9.1
Labor	Andrew Irvine	7,536	32.6	+0.1
One Nation	Dennis Kronk	1,762	7.6	−12.4
Greens	Karey Harrison	1,608	7.0	+7.0
Total formal votes		23,135	98.3	−0.1
Informal votes		404	1.7	+0.1
Turnout		23,539	92.3	−0.2
Two-party-preferred result
National	Mike Horan	13,364	61.5	+3.6
Labor	Andrew Irvine	8,369	38.5	−3.6
National hold		Swing	+3.6	

=== Townsville ===
2004 Queensland state election: Townsville
Party	Candidate	Votes	%	±%
Labor	Mike Reynolds	9,478	42.4	−9.6
Liberal	Margaret Shaw	7,224	32.3	−3.2
Greens	Theresa Millard	2,908	13.0	+13.0
One Nation	Ted Ive	1,878	8.4	+8.4
Independent	Delena Foster	593	2.7	+2.7
Independent	Billy Tait	251	1.1	−3.2
Total formal votes		22,332	97.7	+0.9
Informal votes		514	2.3	−0.9
Turnout		22,846	88.3	−1.2
Two-party-preferred result
Labor	Mike Reynolds	10,813	55.3	−4.0
Liberal	Margaret Shaw	8,730	44.7	+4.0
Labor hold		Swing	−4.0	

=== Warrego ===
2004 Queensland state election: Warrego
Party	Candidate	Votes	%	±%
National	Howard Hobbs	11,403	58.3	+24.5
Labor	Russell Burns	3,555	18.2	+1.9
Independent	Ruth Spencer	2,088	10.7	+10.7
One Nation	Robert Burton	1,792	9.2	−14.6
Independent	Malcolm Groves	729	3.7	+3.7
Total formal votes		19,567	98.4	−0.4
Informal votes		324	1.6	+0.4
Turnout		19,891	92.7	−0.6
Two-party-preferred result
National	Howard Hobbs	13,080	74.8	+24.5
Labor	Russell Burns	4,415	25.2	+25.2
National hold		Swing	+24.5	

=== Waterford ===
2004 Queensland state election: Waterford
Party	Candidate	Votes	%	±%
Labor	Tom Barton	13,266	57.3	+1.1
Liberal	Andrew Harbour	6,334	27.4	+12.6
One Nation	Leonce Kealy	2,000	8.6	−16.2
Greens	Serge Le Royer	1,532	6.6	+6.6
Total formal votes		23,132	97.2	−0.0
Informal votes		661	2.8	+0.0
Turnout		23,793	89.7	−1.6
Two-party-preferred result
Labor	Tom Barton	14,214	66.5	−1.5
Liberal	Andrew Harbour	7,153	33.5	+33.5
Labor hold		Swing	−1.5	

=== Whitsunday ===
2004 Queensland state election: Whitsunday
Party	Candidate	Votes	%	±%
Labor	Jan Jarratt	11,572	51.6	+5.3
Independent	Harry Black	4,721	21.0	+21.0
National	Dan Van Blarcom	3,608	16.1	−8.1
Greens	Lindsay Hains	1,449	6.5	+6.5
One Nation	Henk Schipper	1,088	4.8	−7.6
Total formal votes		22,438	98.0	−0.5
Informal votes		451	2.0	+0.5
Turnout		22,889	90.5	−1.1
Two-candidate-preferred result
Labor	Jan Jarratt	12,548	64.8	+5.2
Independent	Harry Black	6,826	35.2	+35.2
Labor hold		Swing	+5.2	

=== Woodridge ===
2004 Queensland state election: Woodridge
Party	Candidate	Votes	%	±%
Labor	Desley Scott	14,719	70.3	+13.0
Liberal	Dilys Bradbury	4,346	22.1	+22.1
Greens	James Brown	2,371	11.3	+11.3
Total formal votes		20,924	96.5	−0.8
Informal votes		761	3.5	+0.8
Turnout		21,685	89.3	−1.8
Two-party-preferred result
Labor	Desley Scott	15,360	77.9	+6.8
Liberal	Dilys Bradbury	4,346	22.1	+22.1
Labor hold		Swing	+6.8	

=== Yeerongpilly ===
2004 Queensland state election: Yeerongpilly
Party	Candidate	Votes	%	±%
Labor	Simon Finn	13,054	53.6	−8.2
Liberal	Michael Kucera	6,289	25.8	+4.5
Greens	Wayne Wadsworth	3,191	13.1	+5.4
One Nation	Barry Weedon	1,102	4.5	+4.5
Independent	Andrew Lamb	729	3.0	+3.0
Total formal votes		24,365	97.9	+0.1
Informal votes		509	2.1	−0.1
Turnout		24,874	91.8	−0.4
Two-party-preferred result
Labor	Simon Finn	14,822	67.1	−5.1
Liberal	Michael Kucera	7,272	32.9	+5.1
Labor hold		Swing	−5.1	

== See also ==
- 2004 Queensland state election
- Candidates of the Queensland state election, 2004
- Members of the Queensland Legislative Assembly, 2004-2006
