= Electoral results for the district of Gaven =

Queensland, Australia, district election results

This is a list of electoral results for the electoral district of Gaven in Queensland state elections.

== Members for Gaven ==
Member	Party	Term
Robert Poole	Labor	2001–2006
Alex Douglas	National	2006–2006
Phil Gray	Labor	2006–2009
Alex Douglas	Liberal National	2009–2012
Alex Douglas	Independent	2012–2013
Alex Douglas	Palmer United	2013–2014
Alex Douglas	Independent	2014–2015
Sid Cramp	Liberal National	2015–2017
Meaghan Scanlon	Labor	2017–present

== Election results ==
=== Elections in the 2020s ===
2024 Queensland state election: Gaven
Party	Candidate	Votes	%	±%
Labor	Meaghan Scanlon	12,057	41.34	−6.06
Liberal National	Bianca Stone	11,343	38.89	+5.79
One Nation	Sandy Roach	2,440	8.37	+0.07
Greens	Sally Spain	1,515	5.19	−0.31
Legalise Cannabis	Jenelle Porter	1,240	4.25	+0.35
Family First	Ian Reid	573	1.96	+1.96
Total formal votes		29,168	95.45	+0.40
Informal votes		1,389	4.55	−0.40
Turnout		30,557	87.33	+0.61
Two-party-preferred result
Labor	Meaghan Scanlon	14,780	50.67	−7.13
Liberal National	Bianca Stone	14,388	49.33	+7.13
Labor hold		Swing	−7.13	

2020 Queensland state election: Gaven
Party	Candidate	Votes	%	±%
Labor	Meaghan Scanlon	12,932	47.47	+4.40
Liberal National	Kirsten Jackson	9,021	33.11	−12.99
One Nation	Sharon Sewell	2,239	8.22	+8.22
Greens	Sally Spain	1,503	5.52	−5.31
Legalise Cannabis	Suzette Luyken	1,065	3.91	+3.91
United Australia	Garry Beck	292	1.07	+1.07
Civil Liberties & Motorists	Reyna Drake	192	0.70	+0.70
Total formal votes		27,244	95.05	+1.57
Informal votes		1,419	4.95	−1.57
Turnout		28,663	86.72	+0.31
Two-party-preferred result
Labor	Meaghan Scanlon	15,734	57.75	+7.04
Liberal National	Kirsten Jackson	11,510	42.25	−7.04
Labor hold		Swing	+7.04	

=== Elections in the 2010s ===
2017 Queensland state election: Gaven
Party	Candidate	Votes	%	±%
Liberal National	Sid Cramp	12,210	46.1	+6.4
Labor	Meaghan Scanlon	11,406	43.1	+14.5
Greens	Sally Spain	2,866	10.8	+4.7
Total formal votes		26,482	93.5	−3.4
Informal votes		1,848	6.5	+3.4
Turnout		28,330	86.4	−2.2
Two-party-preferred result
Labor	Meaghan Scanlon	13,430	50.7	+3.5
Liberal National	Sid Cramp	13,052	49.3	−3.5
Labor gain from Liberal National		Swing	+3.5	

2015 Queensland state election: Gaven
Party	Candidate	Votes	%	±%
Liberal National	Sid Cramp	11,786	38.95	−16.21
Labor	Michael Riordan	8,700	28.75	+5.89
Independent	Alex Douglas	3,779	12.49	+12.49
Palmer United	Adam Marcinkowski	2,740	9.05	+9.05
Greens	Toni McPherson	1,852	6.12	+0.54
Family First	Ben O'Brien	1,083	3.58	−1.14
Independent	Chris Ivory	321	1.06	+1.06
Total formal votes		30,261	96.86	−0.14
Informal votes		980	3.14	+0.14
Turnout		31,241	88.39	−1.15
Two-party-preferred result
Liberal National	Sid Cramp	13,362	52.24	−16.86
Labor	Michael Riordan	12,214	47.76	+16.86
Liberal National hold		Swing	−16.86	

2012 Queensland state election: Gaven
Party	Candidate	Votes	%	±%
Liberal National	Alex Douglas	15,175	55.16	+13.23
Labor	Michael Riordan	6,289	22.86	−16.94
Katter's Australian	Brian Zimmerman	2,413	8.77	+8.77
Greens	Stephen Power	1,536	5.58	−1.43
Family First	Bibe Roadley	1,298	4.72	+2.10
Independent	Penny Toland	799	2.90	+2.90
Total formal votes		27,510	97.00	−0.25
Informal votes		850	3.00	+0.25
Turnout		28,360	89.54	−0.65
Two-party-preferred result
Liberal National	Alex Douglas	16,471	69.10	+18.38
Labor	Michael Riordan	7,365	30.90	−18.38
Liberal National hold		Swing	+18.38	

=== Elections in the 2000s ===
2009 Queensland state election: Gaven
Party	Candidate	Votes	%	±%
Liberal National	Alex Douglas	11,184	41.9	−0.1
Labor	Phil Gray	10,617	39.8	−7.3
Greens	Sally Spain	1,870	7.0	−1.5
Independent	David Montgomery	1,656	6.2	+6.2
Family First	Derek Radke	700	2.6	+0.3
Independent	Ramiah Selwood	646	2.4	+2.4
Total formal votes		26,673	96.8	
Informal votes		754	3.2	
Turnout		27,427	90.2	
Two-party-preferred result
Liberal National	Alex Douglas	12,003	50.7	+3.9
Labor	Phil Gray	11,661	49.3	−3.9
Liberal National gain from Labor		Swing	+3.9	

2006 Queensland state election: Gaven
Party	Candidate	Votes	%	±%
Labor	Phil Gray	13,715	48.2	+0.9
National	Alex Douglas	12,223	42.9	+42.9
Greens	Glen Ryman	2,545	8.9	+0.7
Total formal votes		28,483	96.8	−0.3
Informal votes		941	3.2	+0.3
Turnout		29,424	90.8	+0.1
Two-party-preferred result
Labor	Phil Gray	14,308	53.1	−1.9
National	Alex Douglas	12,642	46.9	+1.9
Labor hold		Swing	−1.9	

2006 Gaven state by-election
Party	Candidate	Votes	%	±%
National	Alex Douglas	11,012	42.51	+42.51
Labor	Phil Gray	9,517	36.74	−10.59
Greens	Glen Ryman	2,036	7.86	−0.33
Independent	Daren Riley	1,982	7.65	+7.65
Independent	Phil Connolly	683	2.64	−3.14
One Nation	Steve Moir	672	2.59	+2.59
Total formal votes		25,902	96.44	+0.66
Informal votes		956	3.56	−0.66
Turnout		26,858	83.55	−7.14
Two-party-preferred result
National	Alex Douglas	11,807	53.35	+53.35
Labor	Phil Gray	10,324	46.65	−8.31
National gain from Labor		Swing	N/A	

2004 Queensland state election: Gaven
Party	Candidate	Votes	%	±%
Labor	Robert Poole	12,102	47.3	+0.9
Liberal	Ray Stevens	9,898	38.7	+38.7
Greens	Sally Spain	2,093	8.2	−0.4
Independent	Phil Connolly	1,477	5.8	−3.0
Total formal votes		25,570	97.1	+0.6
Informal votes		765	2.9	−0.6
Turnout		26,335	90.7	−0.6
Two-party-preferred result
Labor	Robert Poole	12,876	55.0	−2.6
Liberal	Ray Stevens	10,551	45.0	+45.0
Labor hold		Swing	−2.6	

2001 Queensland state election: Gaven
Party	Candidate	Votes	%	±%
Labor	Robert Poole	9,969	46.4	+15.0
National	Bill Baumann	7,178	33.4	+10.9
Independent	Phil Connolly	1,883	8.8	+8.8
Greens	Sally Spain	1,839	8.6	+3.0
Independent	David Cassidy	596	2.8	+2.8
Total formal votes		21,465	96.5	
Informal votes		767	3.5	
Turnout		22,232	91.3	
Two-party-preferred result
Labor	Robert Poole	10,776	57.6	+14.6
National	Bill Baumann	7,933	42.4	−14.6
Labor gain from National		Swing	+14.6	
