= Candidates of the 2004 Queensland state election =

The 2004 Queensland state election was held on 7 February 2004.

== By-elections ==
- On 5 May 2001, Lex Bell (Independent) was elected to succeed former Premier Rob Borbidge (National), who resigned on 20 March 2001, as the member for Surfers Paradise.
- On 26 April 2003, Chris Foley (Independent) was elected to succeed John Kingston (Independent), who resigned on 24 March 2003, as the member for Maryborough.

== Retiring Members ==
=== Labor ===
- Steve Bredhauer (Cook)
- Wendy Edmond (Mount Coot-tha)
- Matt Foley (Yeerongpilly)
- Anita Phillips (Thuringowa)

=== Liberal ===
- Joan Sheldon (Caloundra)
- David Watson (Moggill)

=== National ===
- Vince Lester (Keppel)

== Legislative Assembly ==
Sitting members are shown in bold text. Successful candidates are highlighted in the relevant colour. Where there is possible confusion, an asterisk (*) is also used.

Electorate	Held by	Labor candidate	Coalition candidate	One Nation candidate	Greens candidate	Independent candidates
Albert	Labor	**Margaret Keech**	Corey Kolar (Lib)	Chris Coyle	Bill Livermore	
Algester	Labor	**Karen Struthers**	Richard Bradley (Lib)	Dale Barnard	Gary Crocker	
Ashgrove	Labor	**Jim Fouras**	Terry Mendies (Lib)		Mike Stasse	
Aspley	Labor	**Bonny Barry**	Trevor Nelson-Jones (Lib)		Dennis Delalande	
Barron River	Labor	**Lesley Clark**	Stephen Welsh (Lib)	Peter Starr	Denis Walls	Andrew Ryan
Beaudesert	National	Michael de Lacy	**Kev Lingard** (Nat)	Lesley Millar	Mike Beale	
Brisbane Central	Labor	**Peter Beattie**	Reg Little (Lib)		Richard Nielsen	Adrian McAvoy; Alan Skyring; Coral Wynter
Broadwater	Labor	**Peta-Kaye Croft**	Margaret Grummitt (Nat)	Peter Elliott	Dean Hepburn	
Bulimba	Labor	**Pat Purcell**	Glenn Snowdon (Lib)		John Houghton	
Bundaberg	Labor	**Nita Cunningham**	Jack Dempsey (Nat)		Peter Ryan	Adrian Wone
Bundamba	Labor	**Jo-Ann Miller**	Paul Cole (Lib)	Mike Atkin	Jim Prentice	
Burdekin	Labor	**Steve Rodgers**	Rosemary Menkens (Nat)	Merle Poletto	Mike Rubenach	Jeff Knuth
Burleigh	Labor	**Christine Smith**	Max Duncan (Nat)	Paul Lewis	Inge Light	
Burnett	Labor	**Trevor Strong**	Rob Messenger (Nat)			
Cairns	Labor	**Desley Boyle**	Bob Manning (Lib)	Ian Noon	Meredyth Woodward	
Callide	National	David Pullen	**Jeff Seeney** (Nat)	Jim Dwyer		
Caloundra	Liberal	Christine Anthony	Mark McArdle (Lib)	Ian Nelson	Tony McLeod	
Capalaba	Labor	**Michael Choi**	Phill Costello (Lib)		Bob Knowles	
Charters Towers	Labor	**Christine Scott**	Shane Knuth (Nat)	Jerry Burnett		
Chatsworth	Labor	**Terry Mackenroth**	Andrew Hatfield (Lib)		Rob Wilson	
Clayfield	Labor	**Liddy Clark**	Sally Hannah (Lib)		Peter Thomas	Robyn McGee
Cleveland	Labor	**Darryl Briskey**	David Fenwick (Lib)		Thomas Petitt	
Cook	Labor	Jason O'Brien	Graham Elmes (Nat)	David Ballestrin	Neville St John-Wood	Bruce Gibson
Cunningham	National	Daniel King	**Stuart Copeland** (Nat)	Peter Mace		
Currumbin	Labor	**Merri Rose**	Jann Stuckey (Lib)	Carol Minter	Anja Light	
Darling Downs	Independent	Annette Frizzell	**Ray Hopper** (Nat)	David Hoy		Bruce Chalmers; Kathy Sankey
Everton	Labor	**Rod Welford**	Tracy Palmer-Davis (Lib)		Debbi Stainsby	Leo de Marchi
Ferny Grove	Labor	**Geoff Wilson**	Andrew Patterson (Lib)		Di Clark	
Fitzroy	Labor	**Jim Pearce**	John Engwicht (Nat)			
Gaven	Labor	**Robert Poole**	Ray Stevens (Lib)		Sally Spain	Phil Connolly
Gladstone	Independent	Julianne Grice	John Todd (Nat)			**Liz Cunningham**
Glass House	Labor	**Carolyn Male**	John Longhurst (Nat)	Santo Ferraro	Eve Scopes	
Greenslopes	Labor	**Gary Fenlon**	Natalie Garratt (Lib)		Darryl Rosin	Warren Simondson
Gregory	National	Shane Guley	**Vaughan Johnson** (Nat)	Ian Espie		
Gympie	One Nation	Rae Gate	Christian Rowan (Nat)	Colin Bailey	Glenda Stasse	Martin Poole; **Elisa Roberts***; Wayne Sachs
Hervey Bay	Labor	**Andrew McNamara**	Bernie Martin (Nat)		Jacqueline Goodfellow	David Dalgleish; Glen Poulton
Hinchinbrook	National	Guni Liepins	**Marc Rowell** (Nat)	Trevor Mitchell		Andrew Lancini
Inala	Labor	**Henry Palaszczuk**	Christopher Cramond (Lib)	George Pugh	Nigel Quinlan	Adrian Skerritt
Indooroopilly	Labor	**Ronan Lee**	Allan Pidgeon (Lib)	John Drew	Chris Head	
Ipswich	Labor	**Rachel Nolan**	Bob Harper (Lib)		Clare Rudkin	Colene Hughes
Ipswich West	Labor	**Don Livingstone**	Jean Bray (Lib)	Alan Price	Sarai O'Reilly-Reis	Michael Ward
Kallangur	Labor	**Ken Hayward**	Fay Driscoll (Nat)	Howard Shepherd	Suzi Tooke	
Kawana	Labor	**Chris Cummins**	Harry Burnett (Lib)	Paul Westbury	Susan McLeod	
Keppel	National	Paul Hoolihan	Neil Fisher (Nat)	Herb Clarke		Naomi Johns (Dem); John Murphy; Bruce Piggott
Kurwongbah	Labor	**Linda Lavarch**	Terry Orreal (Nat)	Dean Westbury	Daniel Boon	Connie Wood
Lockyer	One Nation	John Kelly	Ian Rickuss (Nat)	**Bill Flynn**	Marie Johnston	Peter Prenzler
Logan	Labor	**John Mickel**	Joy Drescher (Nat)		Eileen Brown	Ron Frood
Lytton	Labor	**Paul Lucas**	Glenn Weymouth (Lib)		Panche Hadzi-Andonov	
Mackay	Labor	**Tim Mulherin**	Craig Joy (Nat)	John Bonaventura	Jen Hayward	
Mansfield	Labor	**Phil Reeves**	John Olive (Lib)		Jan McNicol	
Maroochydore	National	Debbie Blumel	**Fiona Simpson** (Nat)	Patrick Rozanski	Lindsay Holt	Anita Gordon
Maryborough	Independent	Doug Loggie			Stephen Walker	**Chris Foley**
Mirani	National	Mark D'Elboux	**Ted Malone** (Nat)	Rod Robinson		Edward Vaughan
Moggill	Liberal	Lisa Rayner	Bruce Flegg (Lib)		Lenore Taylor	
Mount Coot-tha	Labor	Andrew Fraser	Ray Sargent (Lib)		Andrew Carroll	Dave Noke
Mount Gravatt	Labor	**Judy Spence**	Richard Leworthy (Lib)	Karen Bracken		J. F. Barnes
Mount Isa	Labor	**Tony McGrady**	Alan Dredge (Nat)		Nick Harris	
Mount Ommaney	Labor	**Julie Attwood**	Keith Hamilton (Lib)		Clive Brazier	Wayne Kirk
Mudgeeraba	Labor	**Dianne Reilly**	Scott Paterson (Lib)	Steve Moir	Nicole Chegwyn	Gary Pead
Mulgrave	Labor	**Warren Pitt**	Desley Vella (Nat)	Arietta Mitchell		Dominic Frisone
Mundingburra	Labor	**Lindy Nelson-Carr**	Steve Hawker (Lib)	John Weil	Matt Grantham	Sandra Hubert
Murrumba	Labor	**Dean Wells**	Susan Haskell (Lib)		Rick Pass	
Nanango	Independent	Nick Holliday	Nina Temperton (Nat)	Bob Gold	Desiree Mahoney	**Dorothy Pratt**
Nicklin	Independent	Linda Hanson	Leo Woodward (Nat)	Clinton Booth	Robert Winny	**Peter Wellington**
Noosa	Labor	**Cate Molloy**	Glen Elmes (Lib)	Ernest Lake	Jennie Harvie	
Nudgee	Labor	**Neil Roberts**	Lorne Thurgar (Lib)		Mark Carey-Smith	
Pumicestone	Labor	**Carryn Sullivan**	Pat Daly (Lib)	Thomas Hobbins	Lyn Dickinson	
Redcliffe	Labor	**Ray Hollis**	Terry Rogers (Lib)			Rob McJannett
Redlands	Labor	**John English**	John Hegarty (Nat)	John Walter	Lyndon Harris	
Robina	Liberal	Bruce Simmonds	**Bob Quinn** (Lib)		Kelly Houston	
Rockhampton	Labor	**Robert Schwarten**	Pamela Olive (Nat)			
Sandgate	Labor	**Gordon Nuttall**	Luke Howarth (Lib)		Susan Black	Ron Eaton; Rod McDonough
South Brisbane	Labor	**Anna Bligh**	Alister Cowper (Lib)		Juanita Wheeler	Lynda Hansen
Southern Downs	National	Leanne King	**Lawrence Springborg** (Nat)	John Coyle	Jonathan Rihan	
Southport	Labor	**Peter Lawlor**	Bob Bennett (Nat)	Ron Williams	Ian Latto	
Springwood	Labor	**Barbara Stone**	Andrea Ross (Nat)		John Reddington	
Stafford	Labor	**Terry Sullivan**	Christopher Kelly (Lib)		Sue Meehan	
Stretton	Labor	**Stephen Robertson**	Paul Wood (Lib)		Stan Cajdler	
Surfers Paradise	Independent	David Parrish	John-Paul Langbroek (Lib)		Graham Lapthorne	**Lex Bell**
Tablelands	One Nation	Arthur Yates	Cheryl Tonkin (Nat)	**Rosa Lee Long**		
Thuringowa	Labor	Craig Wallace	Sandra Chesney (Nat)	Bill Hankin	Meg Davis	David Moyle; John Ryan
Toowoomba North	Labor	**Kerry Shine**	Ian Douglas (Nat)	Sean Rycard	Michael Kane	
Toowoomba South	National	Andrew Irvine	**Mike Horan** (Nat)	Dennis Kronk	Karey Harrison	
Townsville	Labor	**Mike Reynolds**	Margaret Shaw (Lib)	Ted Ive	Theresa Millard	Delena Foster; Billy Tait
Warrego	National	Russell Burns	**Howard Hobbs** (Nat)	Robert Burton		Malcolm Groves; Ruth Spencer
Waterford	Labor	**Tom Barton**	Andrew Harbour (Lib)	Leonce Kealy	Serge le Royer	
Whitsunday	Labor	**Jan Jarratt**	Dan van Blarcom (Nat)	Henk Schipper	Lindsay Hains	Harry Black
Woodridge	Labor	**Desley Scott**	Dilys Bradbury (Lib)		James Brown	
Yeerongpilly	Labor	Simon Finn	Michael Kucera (Lib)	Barry Weedon	Wayne Wadsworth	Andrew Lamb

== Unregistered parties and groups ==
- The Socialist Alliance endorsed Coral Wynter in Brisbane Central, Adrian Skerritt in Inala and Lynda Hansen in South Brisbane.
- Federal Independent member for Kennedy Bob Katter endorsed Jeff Knuth in Burdekin, Bruce Chalmers in Darling Downs, Andrew Lancini in Hinchinbrook, Sandra Hubert in Mundingburra and David Moyle in Thuringowa.

== See also ==
- Members of the Queensland Legislative Assembly, 2001–2004
- Members of the Queensland Legislative Assembly, 2004–2006
- 2004 Queensland state election
