= Members of the Queensland Legislative Assembly, 2006–2009 =

- ←2004–2006 2009–2012→

This is a list of members of the 52nd Legislative Assembly of Queensland from 2006 to 2009, as elected at the 2006 election held on 9 September 2006.

Name	Party	District	Term in office
Julie Attwood	Labor	Mount Ommaney	1998–2012
Bonny Barry	Labor	Aspley	2001–2009
Hon Peter Beattie ^{[1]}	Labor	Brisbane Central	1989–2007
Hon Anna Bligh	Labor	South Brisbane	1995–2012
Chris Bombolas	Labor	Chatsworth	2006–2009
Hon Desley Boyle	Labor	Cairns	1998–2012
Michael Choi	Labor	Capalaba	2001–2012
Stuart Copeland	National/Liberal National ^{[2]}	Cunningham	2001–2009
Andrew Cripps	National/Liberal National	Hinchinbrook	2006–2017
Peta-Kaye Croft	Labor	Broadwater	2001–2012
Liz Cunningham	Independent	Gladstone	1995–2015
Vicky Darling	Labor	Sandgate	2006–2012
Jack Dempsey	National/Liberal National	Bundaberg	2006–2015
Steve Dickson	Liberal/Liberal National	Kawana	2006–2017
Glen Elmes	Liberal/Liberal National	Noosa	2006–2017
John English	Labor	Redlands	2001–2009
Gary Fenlon	Labor	Greenslopes	1989–1995, 1998–2009
Simon Finn	Labor	Yeerongpilly	2004–2012
Dr Bruce Flegg	Liberal/Liberal National	Moggill	2004–2015
Chris Foley	Independent	Maryborough	2003–2012
Hon Andrew Fraser	Labor	Mount Coot-tha	2004–2012
David Gibson	National/Liberal National	Gympie	2006–2015
Grace Grace ^{[1]}	Labor	Brisbane Central	2007–2012, 2015–present
Phil Gray	Labor	Gaven	2006–2009
Hon Ken Hayward	Labor	Kallangur	1986–2009
Stirling Hinchliffe	Labor	Stafford	2006–2012, 2015–present
Howard Hobbs	National/Liberal National	Warrego	1986–2015
Paul Hoolihan	Labor	Keppel	2004–2012
Ray Hopper	National/Liberal National	Darling Downs	2001–2015
Mike Horan	National/Liberal National	Toowoomba South	1991–2012
Jan Jarratt	Labor	Whitsunday	2001–2012
Vaughan Johnson	National/Liberal National	Gregory	1989–2015
Kate Jones	Labor	Ashgrove	2006–2012, 2015–2020
Hon Margaret Keech	Labor	Albert	2001–2012
Betty Kiernan	Labor	Mount Isa	2006–2012
Shane Knuth	National/Liberal National	Charters Towers	2004–present
John-Paul Langbroek	Liberal/Liberal National	Surfers Paradise	2004–present
Linda Lavarch	Labor	Kurwongbah	1997–2009
Peter Lawlor	Labor	Southport	2001–2012
Ronan Lee	Labor/Greens^{[3]}	Indooroopilly	2001–2009
Rosa Lee Long	One Nation	Tablelands	2001–2009
Hon Kev Lingard	National/Liberal National	Beaudesert	1983–2009
Hon Paul Lucas	Labor	Lytton	1996–2012
Carolyn Male	Labor	Glass House	2001–2012
Ted Malone	National/Liberal National	Mirani	1994–2015
Mark McArdle	Liberal/Liberal National	Caloundra	2004–2020
Andrew McNamara	Labor	Hervey Bay	2001–2009
Rosemary Menkens	National/Liberal National	Burdekin	2004–2015
Rob Messenger	National/Liberal National	Burnett	2004–2012
Hon John Mickel	Labor	Logan	1998–2012
Jo-Ann Miller	Labor	Bundamba	2000–2020
Evan Moorhead	Labor	Waterford	2006–2012
Hon Tim Mulherin	Labor	Mackay	1995–2015
Hon Lindy Nelson-Carr	Labor	Mundingburra	1998–2012
Tim Nicholls	Liberal/Liberal National	Clayfield	2006–present
Rachel Nolan	Labor	Ipswich	2001–2012
Jason O'Brien	Labor	Cook	2004–2012
Annastacia Palaszczuk	Labor	Inala	2006–present
Jim Pearce	Labor	Fitzroy	1989–2009, 2015–2017
Hon Warren Pitt	Labor	Mulgrave	1989–1995, 1998–2009
Dorothy Pratt	Independent	Nanango	1998–2012
Pat Purcell	Labor	Bulimba	1992–2009
Phil Reeves	Labor	Mansfield	1998–2012
Dianne Reilly	Labor	Mudgeeraba	2001–2009
Hon Mike Reynolds	Labor	Townsville	1998–2009
Ian Rickuss	National/Liberal National	Lockyer	2004–2017
Neil Roberts	Labor	Nudgee	1995–2012
Hon Stephen Robertson	Labor	Stretton	1992–2012
Hon Robert Schwarten	Labor	Rockhampton	1989–1992, 1995–2012
Desley Scott	Labor	Woodridge	2001–2015
Jeff Seeney	National/Liberal National	Callide	1998–2017
Hon Kerry Shine	Labor	Toowoomba North	2001–2012
Fiona Simpson	National/Liberal National	Maroochydore	1992–present
Christine Smith	Labor	Burleigh	2001–2012
Hon Judy Spence	Labor	Mount Gravatt	2001–2012
Lawrence Springborg	National/Liberal National	Southern Downs	1989–2017
Ray Stevens	Liberal/Liberal National	Robina	2006–present
Barbara Stone	Labor	Springwood	2001–2012
Karen Struthers	Labor	Algester	1998–2012
Jann Stuckey	Liberal/Liberal National	Currumbin	2004–2020
Carryn Sullivan	Labor	Pumicestone	2001–2012
Lillian van Litsenburg	Labor	Redcliffe	2006–2012
Craig Wallace	Labor	Thuringowa	2004–2012
Phil Weightman	Labor	Cleveland	2006–2009
Hon Rod Welford	Labor	Everton	1989–2009
Peter Wellington	Independent	Nicklin	1998–2017
Hon Dean Wells	Labor	Murrumba	1986–2012
Wayne Wendt	Labor	Ipswich West	2006–2012
Steve Wettenhall	Labor	Barron River	2006–2012
Hon Geoff Wilson	Labor	Ferny Grove	1998–2012

^{1} On 13 September 2007, the Labor member for Brisbane Central and Premier, Peter Beattie, resigned. Labor candidate Grace Grace won the resulting by-election on 13 October 2007.
^{2} The opposition Liberal and National parties merged to create the Liberal National Party of Queensland on 27 July 2008.
^{3} On 5 October 2008, the member for Indooroopilly, Ronan Lee, resigned from the Labor Party and joined the Queensland Greens, becoming their first ever member of parliament in the state.

== See also ==
- 2006 Queensland state election
- Beattie Ministry (Labor) (1998–2007)
- Bligh Ministry (Labor) (2007–present)
