= Members of the Queensland Legislative Assembly, 2004–2006 =

- ←2001–2004 2006-2009→

This is a list of members of the 51st Legislative Assembly of Queensland from 2004 to 2006, as elected at the 2004 state election held on 7 February 2004.

Name	Party	District	Term of office
Julie Attwood	Labor	Mount Ommaney	1998–2012
Bonny Barry	Labor	Aspley	2001–2009
Hon Tom Barton	Labor	Waterford	1992–2006
Hon Peter Beattie	Labor	Brisbane Central	1989–2007
Hon Anna Bligh	Labor	South Brisbane	1995–2012
Hon Desley Boyle	Labor	Cairns	1998–2012
Darryl Briskey	Labor	Cleveland	1989–2006
Michael Caltabiano ^{[2]}	Liberal	Chatsworth	2005–2006
Michael Choi	Labor	Capalaba	2001–2012
Liddy Clark	Labor	Clayfield	2001–2006
Dr Lesley Clark	Labor	Barron River	1989–1995, 1998–2006
Stuart Copeland	National	Cunningham	2001–2009
Peta-Kaye Croft	Labor	Broadwater	2001–2012
Hon Chris Cummins	Labor	Kawana	2001–2006
Liz Cunningham	Independent	Gladstone	1995–2015
Hon Nita Cunningham	Labor	Bundaberg	1998–2006
Dr Alex Douglas ^{[3]}	National	Gaven	2006, 2009–2015
John English	Labor	Redlands	2001–2009
Gary Fenlon	Labor	Greenslopes	1989–1995, 1998–2009
Simon Finn	Labor	Yeerongpilly	2004–2012
Dr Bruce Flegg	Liberal	Moggill	2004–2015
Chris Foley	Independent	Maryborough	2003–2012
Hon Jim Fouras	Labor	Ashgrove	1977–1986, 1989–2006
Andrew Fraser	Labor	Mount Coot-tha	2004–2012
Hon Ken Hayward	Labor	Kallangur	1986–2012
Howard Hobbs	National	Warrego	1986–2015
Hon Ray Hollis ^{[1]}	Labor	Redcliffe	1989–2005
Paul Hoolihan	Labor	Keppel	2004–2012
Ray Hopper	National	Darling Downs	2001–2015
Mike Horan	National	Toowoomba South	1991–2012
Jan Jarratt	Labor	Whitsunday	2001–2012
Vaughan Johnson	National	Gregory	1989–2015
Hon Margaret Keech	Labor	Albert	2001–2012
Shane Knuth	National	Charters Towers	2004–present
John-Paul Langbroek	Liberal	Surfers Paradise	2004–present
Linda Lavarch	Labor	Kurwongbah	1997–2009
Peter Lawlor	Labor	Southport	2001–2012
Ronan Lee	Labor	Indooroopilly	2001–2009
Rosa Lee Long	One Nation	Tablelands	2001–2009
Hon Kev Lingard	National	Beaudesert	1983–2009
Don Livingstone	Labor	Ipswich West	1989–1998, 2001–2006
Hon Paul Lucas	Labor	Lytton	1996–2012
Hon Terry Mackenroth ^{[2]}	Labor	Chatsworth	1977–2005
Carolyn Male	Labor	Glass House	2001–2012
Ted Malone	National	Mirani	1994–2015
Mark McArdle	Liberal	Caloundra	2004–2020
Hon Tony McGrady	Labor	Mount Isa	1989–2006
Andrew McNamara	Labor	Hervey Bay	2001–2009
Rosemary Menkens	National	Burdekin	2004–2015
Rob Messenger	National	Burnett	2004–2012
Hon John Mickel	Labor	Logan	1998–2012
Jo-Ann Miller	Labor	Bundamba	2000–2020
Cate Molloy	Labor/Independent ^{[4]}	Noosa	2001–2006
Hon Tim Mulherin	Labor	Mackay	1995–2015
Lindy Nelson-Carr	Labor	Mundingburra	1998–2012
Rachel Nolan	Labor	Ipswich	2001–2012
Hon Gordon Nuttall	Labor	Sandgate	1992–2006
Jason O'Brien	Labor	Cook	2004–2012
Hon Henry Palaszczuk	Labor	Inala	1984–2006
Jim Pearce	Labor	Fitzroy	1989–2009, 2015–2017
Hon Warren Pitt	Labor	Mulgrave	1989–1995, 1998–2009
Robert Poole ^{[3]}	Labor	Gaven	2001–2006
Dorothy Pratt	Independent	Nanango	1998–2012
Pat Purcell	Labor	Bulimba	1992–2009
Bob Quinn	Liberal	Robina	1989–2006
Phil Reeves	Labor	Mansfield	1998–2012
Dianne Reilly	Labor	Mudgeeraba	2001–2009
Hon Mike Reynolds	Labor	Townsville	1998–2009
Ian Rickuss	National	Lockyer	2004–2017
Elisa Roberts	Independent	Gympie	2001–2006
Neil Roberts	Labor	Nudgee	1995–2012
Hon Stephen Robertson	Labor	Stretton	1992–2012
Terry Rogers ^{[1]}	Liberal	Redcliffe	2005–2006
Marc Rowell	National	Hinchinbrook	1989–2006
Hon Robert Schwarten	Labor	Rockhampton	1989–1992, 1995–2012
Desley Scott	Labor	Woodridge	2001–2015
Jeff Seeney	National	Callide	1998–2017
Kerry Shine	Labor	Toowoomba North	2001–2012
Fiona Simpson	National	Maroochydore	1992–present
Christine Smith	Labor	Burleigh	2001–2012
Hon Judy Spence	Labor	Mount Gravatt	1989–2012
Lawrence Springborg	National	Southern Downs	1989–2017
Barbara Stone	Labor	Springwood	2001–2012
Karen Struthers	Labor	Algester	1998–2012
Jann Stuckey	Liberal	Currumbin	2004–2020
Carryn Sullivan	Labor	Pumicestone	2001–2012
Terry Sullivan	Labor	Stafford	1991–2006
Craig Wallace	Labor	Thuringowa	2004–2012
Hon Rod Welford	Labor	Everton	1989–2009
Peter Wellington	Independent	Nicklin	1998–2017
Hon Dean Wells	Labor	Murrumba	1986–2012
Geoff Wilson	Labor	Ferny Grove	1998–2012

^{1} On 21 July 2005, the Labor member for Redcliffe, Ray Hollis, resigned. Liberal candidate Terry Rogers won the resulting by-election on 20 August 2005.
^{2} On 25 July 2005, the Labor member for Chatsworth and former Deputy Premier, Terry Mackenroth, resigned. Liberal candidate Michael Caltabiano won the resulting by-election on 20 August 2005.
^{3} On 28 February 2006, the Labor member for Gaven, Robert Poole, resigned. National Party candidate Dr Alex Douglas won the resulting by-election on 1 April 2006.
^{4} The member for Noosa, Cate Molloy, left the Labor Party on 20 August 2006 after losing preselection to recontest her seat at the 2006 election. She served out the final month of her term as an independent.

== See also ==
- 2004 Queensland state election
- Beattie Ministry (Labor) (1998–2007)
