= 2004 Queensland state election =

- 7 February 2004

All 89 seats in the Legislative Assembly of Queensland 45 Assembly seats were needed for a majority
- Registered: 2,400,977 ▲5.49%
- Turnout: 2,195,400 (91.44%) (▼1.2 pp)
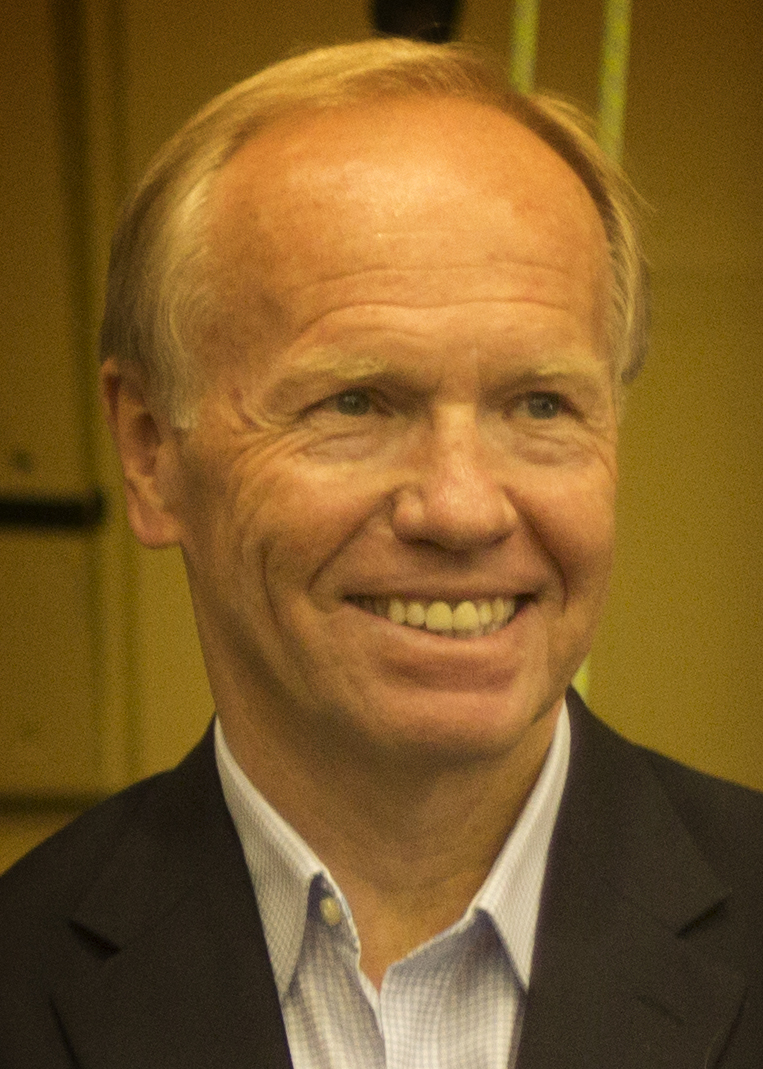

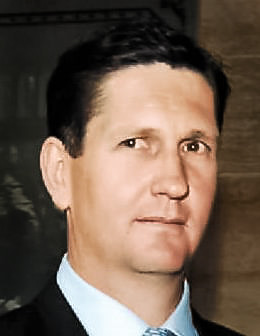
	First party	Second party	Third party
			ON
Leader	Peter Beattie	Lawrence Springborg	Bill Flynn
Party	Labor	National–Liberal Coalition	One Nation
Leader since	20 February 1996	4 February 2003	6 March 2001
Leader's seat	Brisbane Central	Southern Downs	Lockyer (lost seat)
Last election	66 seats, 48.93%	15 seats, 28.48%	3 seats, 8.69%
Seats won	63	20	1
Seat change	▼3	▲5	▼2
Popular vote	1,011,630	763,152	104,980
Percentage	47.01%	35.46%	4.88%
Swing	▼1.92	▲6.98	▼3.81
- The top map shows the first party preference by electorate. The bottom map shows the final two-party preferred vote result by electorate.
Premier before election
Peter Beattie
Labor
Elected Premier
Peter Beattie
Labor

The 2004 Queensland state election was held on 7 February 2004 to elect all 89 members of the state's Legislative Assembly.

The Labor Party (ALP) government of premier Peter Beattie won a third term in office, with its large majority almost untouched.

== Key dates ==
Date	Event
13 January 2004	Writs were issued by the Governor to proceed with an election.
19 January 2004	Close of electoral rolls.
20 January 2004	Close of nominations.
7 February 2004	Polling day, between the hours of 8am and 6pm.
12 February 2004	The Beattie Ministry was reconstituted.
20 February 2004	The writ was returned and the results formally declared.

== Retiring members ==
=== Labor ===
- Steve Bredhauer (Cook)
- Wendy Edmond (Mount Coot-tha)
- Matt Foley (Yeerongpilly)
- Anita Phillips (Thuringowa)

=== Liberal ===
- Joan Sheldon (Caloundra)
- David Watson (Moggill)

=== National ===
- Vince Lester (Keppel)

== Results ==
Party	Votes	%	+/–	Seats	+/–
Labor	1,011,630	47.01	▼1.92	63	▼3
Liberal	398,147	18.50	▲4.18	5	▲2
National	365,005	16.96	▲2.80	15	▲3
Greens	145,522	6.76	▲4.35	0	0
Independents	125,516	5.83	▼2.78	5	0
One Nation	104,980	4.88	▼3.81	1	▼2
Democrats	943	0.04	▼0.30	0	0
Total	2,151,743	100.00	–	89	–
Valid votes	2,151,743	98.01			
Invalid/blank votes	43,657	1.99	▼0.30		
Total votes	2,195,400	100.00	–		
Registered voters/turnout	2,400,977	91.44	▼1.13		

Popular vote
Labor	47.01%
Liberal	18.50%
Nationals	16.96%
Greens	6.76%
One Nation	4.88%
Democrats	0.04%
Independents	5.83%

Seats
Labor	70.79%
Nationals	16.85%
Liberal	5.62%
One Nation	1.12%
Independents	5.62%

== Seats changing hands ==
Seat	2001 Election			Swing	2004 Election		
Seat	Party	Member	Margin	Swing	Margin	Member	Party
Burdekin	Labor	Steve Rodgers	5.13	–9.51	4.39	Rosemary Menkens	National
Burnett	Labor	Trevor Strong	1.70	–4.26	2.56	Rob Messenger	National
Charters Towers	Labor	Christine Scott	2.17	–4.89	2.7	Shane Knuth	National
Currumbin	Labor	Merri Rose	14.55	–17.78	3.23	Jann Stuckey	Liberal
Gympie	One Nation	Elisa Roberts¹	3.26	–13.32	10.05	Elisa Roberts	Independent
Keppel	National	Vince Lester	1.46	–5.23	3.78	Paul Hoolihan	Labor
Lockyer	One Nation	Bill Flynn	7.30	–11.42	4.12	Ian Rickuss	National
Surfers Paradise	Independent	Lex Bell²	8.12	–22.02	13.91	John-Paul Langbroek	Liberal

- Members listed in italics did not contest their seat at this election.
- ¹ Elisa Roberts resigned from the One Nation Party and contested the election as an independent.
- ² Lex Bell won Surfers Paradise as an independent at the 2001 by-election. The National Party had retained the seat at the 2001 election.

== Post-election pendulum ==
Labor seats (63)
Marginal
Clayfield	Liddy Clark	ALP	1.17%
Kawana	Chris Cummins	ALP	1.48%
Mudgeeraba	Dianne Reilly	ALP	1.85%
Indooroopilly	Ronan Lee	ALP	2.08%
Barron River	Lesley Clark	ALP	3.12%
Keppel	Paul Hoolihan	ALP	3.78%
Cairns	Desley Boyle	ALP	3.90%
Hervey Bay	Andrew McNamara	ALP	3.96%
Broadwater	Peta-Kaye Croft	ALP	4.06%
Aspley	Bonny Barry	ALP	4.69%
Gaven	Robert Poole	ALP	4.96%
Burleigh	Christine Smith	ALP	5.04%
Bundaberg	Nita Cunningham	ALP	5.29%
Townsville	Mike Reynolds	ALP	5.33%
Pumicestone	Carryn Sullivan	ALP	5.43%
Fairly Safe
Mundingburra	Lindy Nelson-Carr	ALP	6.22%
Redcliffe	Ray Hollis	ALP	7.10%
Toowoomba North	Kerry Shine	ALP	7.29%
Cook	Jason O'Brien	ALP	7.45%
Mulgrave	Warren Pitt	ALP	7.72%
Thuringowa	Craig Wallace	ALP	7.90%
Redlands	John English	ALP	8.46%
Mansfield	Phil Reeves	ALP	8.56%
Noosa	Cate Molloy	ALP	8.66%
Cleveland	Darryl Briskey	ALP	8.66%
Glass House	Carolyn Male	ALP	8.94%
Ipswich West	Don Livingstone	ALP	9.41%
Springwood	Barbara Stone	ALP	9.72%
Southport	Peter Lawlor	ALP	9.99%
Safe
Mount Gravatt	Judy Spence	ALP	10.32%
Greenslopes	Gary Fenlon	ALP	11.03%
Mount Coot-tha	Andrew Fraser	ALP	11.54%
Everton	Rod Welford	ALP	11.60%
Mount Ommaney	Julie Attwood	ALP	11.63%
Fitzroy	Jim Pearce	ALP	12.35%
Kurwongbah	Linda Lavarch	ALP	12.45%
Murrumba	Dean Wells	ALP	12.69%
Chatsworth	Terry Mackenroth	ALP	12.84%
Ferny Grove	Geoff Wilson	ALP	13.16%
Kallangur	Ken Hayward	ALP	13.66%
Sandgate	Gordon Nuttall	ALP	13.99%
Mount Isa	Tony McGrady	ALP	14.15%
Ashgrove	Jim Fouras	ALP	14.69%
Whitsunday	Jan Jarratt	ALP	14.77% v IND
Stretton	Stephen Robertson	ALP	15.04%
Capalaba	Michael Choi	ALP	15.16%
Mackay	Tim Mulherin	ALP	15.79%
Stafford	Terry Sullivan	ALP	16.34%
Waterford	Tom Barton	ALP	16.52%
Yeerongpilly	Simon Finn	ALP	17.09%
Albert	Margaret Keech	ALP	17.27%
Lytton	Paul Lucas	ALP	17.87%
Algester	Karen Struthers	ALP	17.97%
Bulimba	Pat Purcell	ALP	18.45%
Rockhampton	Robert Schwarten	ALP	18.95%
Nudgee	Neil Roberts	ALP	19.33%
Brisbane Central	Peter Beattie	ALP	19.58%
Very Safe
Ipswich	Rachel Nolan	ALP	21.00%
South Brisbane	Anna Bligh	ALP	21.06%
Logan	John Mickel	ALP	21.25%
Bundamba	Jo-Ann Miller	ALP	24.89%
Woodridge	Desley Scott	ALP	27.95%
Inala	Henry Palaszczuk	ALP	31.02%

National/Liberal seats (20)
Marginal
Caloundra	Mark McArdle	LIB	1.26%
Burnett	Rob Messenger	NAT	2.56%
Charters Towers	Shane Knuth	NAT	2.71%
Currumbin	Jann Stuckey	LIB	3.23%
Maroochydore	Fiona Simpson	NAT	4.06%
Lockyer	Ian Rickuss	NAT	4.12%
Burdekin	Rosemary Menkens	NAT	4.39%
Fairly Safe
Moggill	Bruce Flegg	LIB	6.33%
Beaudesert	Kev Lingard	NAT	8.06%
Robina	Bob Quinn	LIB	8.78%
Safe
Mirani	Ted Malone	NAT	10.64%
Hinchinbrook	Marc Rowell	NAT	10.88% v IND
Toowoomba South	Mike Horan	NAT	11.49%
Surfers Paradise	John-Paul Langbroek	LIB	13.91%
Gregory	Vaughan Johnson	NAT	17.37%
Darling Downs	Ray Hopper	NAT	17.77%
Cunningham	Stuart Copeland	NAT	18.93%
Very Safe
Callide	Jeff Seeney	NAT	23.60%
Warrego	Howard Hobbs	NAT	24.76%
Southern Downs	Lawrence Springborg	NAT	25.22%
Crossbench seats (6)
Gympie	Elisa Roberts	IND	10.05% v ALP
Gladstone	Liz Cunningham	IND	11.25% v ALP
Tablelands	Rosa Lee Long	ONP	12.41% v NAT
Nanango	Dorothy Pratt	IND	12.73% v NAT
Maryborough	Chris Foley	IND	17.98% v ALP
Nicklin	Peter Wellington	IND	29.55% v ALP

== Subsequent changes ==
- On 21 July 2005, Labor Speaker of the Legislative Assembly Ray Hollis (Redcliffe) resigned. At the by-election on 20 August 2005, Terry Rogers gained the seat for the Liberal Party.
- On 25 July 2005, Labor Deputy Premier Terry Mackenroth (Chatsworth) resigned. At the by-election on 20 August 2005, Michael Caltabiano gained the seat for the Liberal Party.
- On 28 February 2006, Labor Party member Robert Poole (Gaven) resigned. At the by-election on 1 April 2006, Alex Douglas gained the seat for the National Party.
- On 21 August 2006, Cate Molloy (Noosa) resigned from the Labor Party and sat as an independent.

== See also ==
- Candidates of the Queensland state election, 2004
- Members of the Queensland Legislative Assembly, 2001–2004
- Members of the Queensland Legislative Assembly, 2004–2006
- Beattie Ministry
