= Meaghan Scanlon =

Australian politician and lawyer

The Honourable Meaghan Scanlon MP
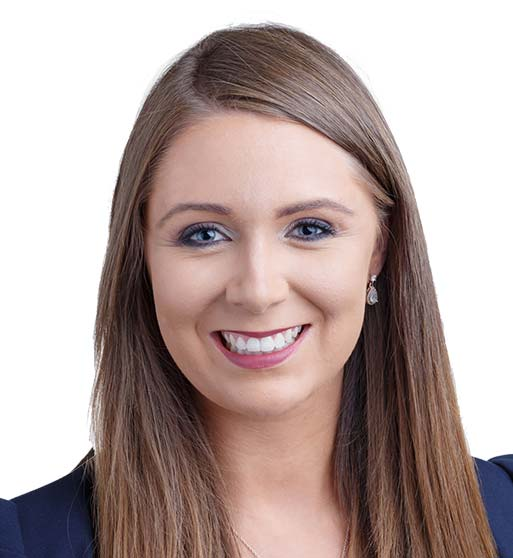

Shadow Attorney-General Shadow Minister for Justice
- Incumbent
- Assumed office 8 November 2024
- Leader: Steven Miles
- Preceded by: Tim Nicholls

Shadow Minister for Housing, Homelessness and Home Ownership
- Incumbent
- Assumed office 8 November 2024
- Leader: Steven Miles
- Preceded by: Tim Mander (as Shadow Minister for Housing and Public Works); David Janetzki (as Shadow Minister for Home Ownership)
Ministerial positions
Minister for Housing, Local Government and Planning and Minister for Public Works
In office 18 December 2023 – 28 October 2024
Premier	Steven Miles
Preceded by	Herself (as Minister for Housing); Cameron Dick (as Minister for State Development, Infrastructure, Local Government and Planning); Mick de Brenni (as Minister for Public Works and Procurement)
Succeeded by	Ann Leahy (as Minister for Local Government); Sam O'Connor (as Minister for Housing and Public Works)
Minister for Housing
In office 18 May 2023 – 18 December 2023
Premier	Annastacia Palaszczuk
Preceded by	Leeanne Enoch
Succeeded by	Herself (as Minister for Housing, Planning and Local Government)
Minister for Science and Youth Affairs
In office 12 November 2020 – 18 May 2023
Premier	Annastacia Palaszczuk
Preceded by	Leeanne Enoch (Note: As Minister for Science.); Di Farmer (Note: As Minister for Child Safety, Youth and Women.)
Succeeded by	Position abolished
Minister for the Environment and the Great Barrier Reef
In office 12 November 2020 – 18 May 2023
Premier	Annastacia Palaszczuk
Preceded by	Leeanne Enoch
Succeeded by	Leanne Linard
Assistant Minister for Tourism Industry Development
In office 12 December 2017 – 12 November 2020
Premier	Annastacia Palaszczuk
Preceded by	Position established
Succeeded by	Michael Healy

Member of the Queensland Legislative Assembly for Gaven
- Incumbent
- Assumed office 25 November 2017
- Preceded by: Sid Cramp

Personal details
- Born: 28 February 1993 (age 33) Gold Coast, Queensland, Australia
- Party: Labor
- Education: Aquinas College
- Alma mater: Griffith University(LLB); Queensland University of Technology
- Occupation: Lawyer; Politician
- Website: www.meaghanscanlon.com

Meaghan Alana Jenkins Scanlon (28 February 1993) is an Australian politician and lawyer. She has been the Labor member for Gaven in the Queensland Legislative Assembly since 2017. She previously served as the Queensland Minister for Housing in 2023. Prior to May 2023, Scanlon was the Environment and the Great Barrier Reef and Minister for Science and Youth Affairs.

== Early life ==
Scanlon was born on the Gold Coast and grew up in the suburb of Nerang. Her father, Phil, migrated from England with his family at an early age. Her mother, Margaret, is from Moe, Victoria. During her school years, she attended Guardian Angels Primary School and Aquinas College. At the age of 13, her father died of melanoma and she began helping her mother care for her brother, who has Down syndrome. Following her graduation from high school, Scanlon completed a Bachelor of Laws at the Gold Coast campus of Griffith University, and a Graduate Diploma of Legal Practice at the Queensland University of Technology. She briefly worked in Brisbane before deciding to pursue a career in politics at the age of 23.

== Political career ==
At the age of 23, Scanlon ran as the Labor candidate for the seat of Fadden in the northern Gold Coast during the 2016 Australian federal election but was defeated by Stuart Robert. She then turned her attention to the 2017 Queensland state election where she ran as the Labor candidate for the central Gold Coast seat of Gaven and defeated Sid Cramp to become, at the age of 24, the youngest woman elected to the Queensland Parliament. She served as the Assistant Minister for Tourism Industry Development, and was considered by some to be the unofficial minister for the Gold Coast at the time, due to Gaven having been the only Gold Coast–based seat held by the Queensland Labor Government.

Following the Queensland Labor Government's win at the 2020 Queensland state election, with Scanlon again winning the seat of Gaven, she was appointed to the Labor government's third-term cabinet as Minister for the Environment, the Great Barrier Reef, Science and Youth Affairs. She maintained this position until May 2023, when she was given the Housing portfolio.

== Personal life ==
In September 2018, Scanlon and ministerial colleague Mark Bailey confirmed that they had been in a relationship since 2016. In 2026 the two announced that they had amicably ended their relationship after nearly ten years.

== Notes ==
Parliament of Queensland
Preceded by Sid Cramp	Member for Gaven; 2017–present	Incumbent
