= Sid Cramp =

Australian politician

Member of the Queensland Legislative Assembly for Gaven
- In office 31 January 2015 – 25 November 2017
- Preceded by: Alex Douglas
- Succeeded by: Meaghan Scanlon

Personal details
- Party: Liberal National Party
- Spouse: Danielle
- Children: Three
- Occupation: Ambulance call taker and dispatcher

Sidney Ernest Cramp is an Australian politician. He was the Liberal National Party member for Gaven in the Queensland Legislative Assembly from 2015 to 2017.

Parliament of Queensland
Preceded by Alex Douglas	Member for Gaven; 2015–2017	Succeeded by Meaghan Scanlon
