= 2006 Gaven state by-election =

An Australian by-election was held for the Legislative Assembly of Queensland district of Gaven on 1 April 2006. It was triggered by the resignation of sitting Labor member Robert Poole.

The by-election resulted in the Labor Party losing the seat to National Party candidate Alex Douglas.

== Background ==
Robert Poole first came to parliament at the 2001 state election by winning the newly created seat of Gaven. He was subsequently re-elected at the 2004 state election. During his second term, Poole attracted criticism for the amount of time he spent in Thailand, where his wife and children lived. Things came to a head in February 2006 when Poole announced that he'd be spending three months in Thailand to recover from knee surgery. The Opposition demanded a by-election, but Premier Peter Beattie said he was prepared to wait until the beginning of April for Poole to return home. Poole, not prepared to return home early from his trip, announced his decision to resign his seat on 28 February 2006.

== Candidates ==
Labor preselected Phil Gray as their candidate to defend the seat. Gray had previously been campaign manager to outgoing member Robert Poole.

The Liberal Party—who had been the Labor Party's chief opponent in Gaven at the 2004 election—did not contest the by-election, instead deferring to the National Party due to the coalition agreement that the two parties not stand candidates against each other in the same seat. This attracted criticism from some from commentators who believed the Liberal Party was better placed to win the suburban seat than the rural-centric Nationals. The National Party endorsed general practitioner Alex Douglas as its candidate.

== Results ==
National Party candidate Alex Douglas won the seat from Labor Party. It marked the third by-election loss for Labor during the parliamentary term, following on from the 2005 losses in Chatsworth and Redcliffe.

Gaven state by-election, 2006
Party	Candidate	Votes	%	±%
National	Alex Douglas	11,012	42.51	+42.51
Labor	Phil Gray	9,517	36.74	−10.59
Greens	Glen Ryman	2,036	7.86	−0.33
	Daren Riley	1,982	7.65	+7.65
	Phil Connolly	683	2.64	−3.14
One Nation	Steve Moir	672	2.59	+2.59
Total formal votes		25,902	96.44	+0.66
Informal votes		956	3.56	−0.66
Turnout		26,858	83.55	−7.14
Two-party-preferred result
National	Alex Douglas	11,807	53.35	+53.35
Labor	Phil Gray	10,324	46.65	−8.31
National gain from Labor		Swing	N/A	

== Aftermath ==
Alex Douglas's stint in parliament would prove to be a short one. A general election was called by Premier Peter Beattie later that year where Labor recouped the seat of Gaven, with Phil Gray once again their candidate.

However, the tables turned again at 2009 state election when Alex Douglas, running as a candidate for the newly formed Liberal National Party, defeated Gray in their third contest against one another.

== See also ==
- List of Queensland state by-elections
