= Phil Gray (politician) =

Australian politician

Member of the Queensland Legislative Assembly for Gaven
- In office 9 September 2006 – 20 March 2009
- Preceded by: Alex Douglas
- Succeeded by: Alex Douglas

Personal details
- Born: Philip Roy Gray; 20 April 1947 Brisbane, Queensland, Australia
- Died: 19 April 2017 (aged 69) Scottsdale, Tasmania, Australia
- Party: Labor
- Education: University of Queensland, University of New England
- Occupation: School teacher, Guidance Officer, Education officer

Philip Roy Gray (20 April 1947 – 19 April 2017) was an Australian politician. He was a Labor member of the Legislative Assembly of Queensland from 2006 to 2009.

== Early life ==
Born in Brisbane, Gray attended state schools before becoming a teacher, studying at the University of Queensland and the University of New England

== Politics ==
A member of the Australian Labor Party, he was elected as the member for Gaven in the 2006 state election, defeating National Party member Alex Douglas, who had won the seat against Gray in a by-election earlier that year.

In late 2008, Gray earned himself some bad publicity when he was accused of two instances of "bullying", both of them against elderly women. In the first instance he threatened to sue an outspoken constituent who, at a public meeting in November 2008, said she would not be voting for Gray. This was followed in December by a legal threat against a Labor member, from whom he demanded $10,000 and an apology, for criticising him in an internal party report. His behaviour was denounced by Premier Anna Bligh and Gray publicly apologised for his actions.

The 2009 state election pitted Gray against Alex Douglas for the third consecutive time. On this occasion, Douglas, running under the banner of the newly formed Liberal National Party, narrowly emerged as the victor. Following his defeat, Gray angrily slammed what he perceived as negative and "biased" coverage of him by the Gold Coast Bulletin.

== Later life ==
Gray died on 19 April 2017 in Tasmania following a long illness.

Parliament of Queensland
Preceded by Alex Douglas	Member for Gaven; 2006–2009	Succeeded by Alex Douglas
