= Jack Dempsey (politician) =

Australian politician (born 1966)

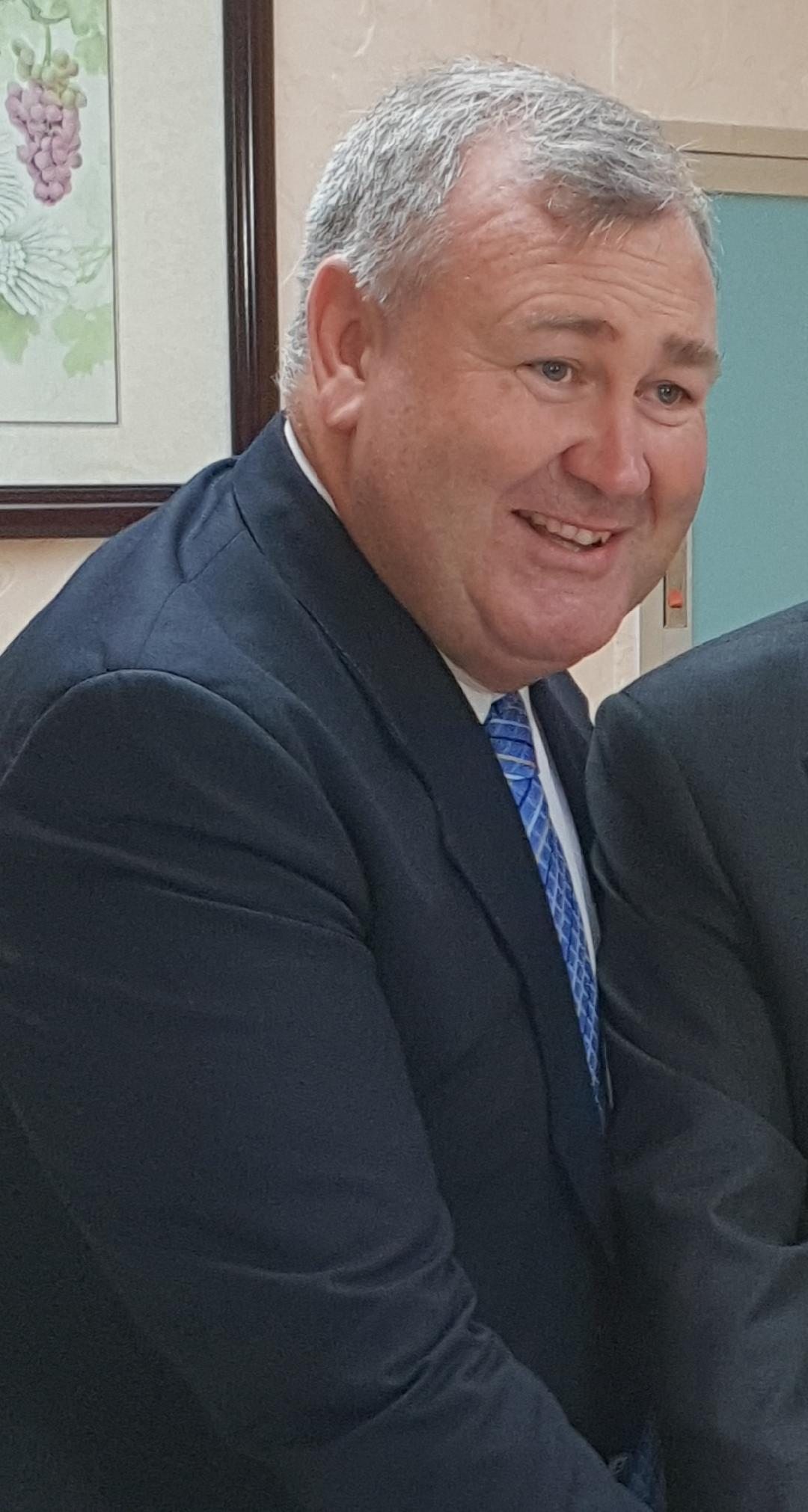

Mayor of Bundaberg Regional Council
- In office 19 March 2016 – 2024
- Preceded by: Malcolm Forman
- Succeeded by: Helen Blackburn

Minister for Police and Community Safety of Queensland
- In office 23 April 2012 – 31 January 2015
- Premier: Campbell Newman
- Preceded by: David Gibson
- Succeeded by: Jo-Ann Miller

Minister for Aboriginal, Torres Strait Islander and Multicultural Affairs of Queensland
- In office 3 April 2012 – 23 April 2012
- Premier: Campbell Newman
- Preceded by: Curtis Pitt (ATSI Partnerships); Annastacia Palaszczuk (Multicultural Affairs)
- Succeeded by: Glen Elmes

Minister assisting the Premier of Queensland
- In office 3 April 2012 – 23 April 2012
- Premier: Campbell Newman
- Preceded by: New office
- Succeeded by: Glen Elmes

Member of the Queensland Parliament for Bundaberg
- In office 9 September 2006 – 31 January 2015
- Preceded by: Nita Cunningham
- Succeeded by: Leanne Donaldson

Personal details
- Born: 7 April 1966 (age 60) Ireland
- Party: Independent
- Other political affiliations: LNP (2008–2018); National Party (2006–2008)
- Spouse: Christine Dempsey
- Occupation: Police officer

John Mark Dempsey (born 7 April 1966) is an Australian politician who served as the Mayor of the Bundaberg Regional Council from 2016 to 2024. He previously served as the Queensland Minister for Police and Community Safety in the Newman Government and was a member of the Queensland Legislative Assembly from 2006 to 2015.

He is currently the CEO of the Aurukun Shire Council.

== Political career ==
=== Opposition ===
A member of the National Party, Dempsey was first elected at the 2006 state election to the Electoral district of Bundaberg. He became a member of the Liberal National Party when the National party merged with the Liberal Party in July 2008.

While in Opposition, Dempsey served as the Shadow Parliamentary Secretary to the Shadow Minister for Police and Corrective Services from 21 September 2006 to 12 August 2008. He was a member of the Parliamentary Crime and Misconduct Committee from 11 October 2006 to 16 June 2011, and was the Shadow Minister for Child Safety and Shadow Minister for Sport from 6 April 2009 to 29 November 2010.

Dempsey was appointed the Shadow Minister for the Environment and the Shadow Minister for Sport and Recreation from 29 November 2010 to 11 April 2011. He was appointed as Shadow Minister for Mining and Resource Management from 11 April 2011 to 19 February 2012.

=== Newman Government ===
In March 2012, the Liberal National Party won the 2012 Queensland state election. Dempsey was sworn in as Minister for Aboriginal and Torres Strait Islander and Multicultural Affairs and Minister assisting the Premier on 3 April 2012.

On 16 April 2012 Dempsey was appointed acting Minister for Police and Community Safety following the resignation of David Gibson. He was appointed to the office in his own right on 23 April 2012, with Glen Elmes taking his place as Minister for Aboriginal and Torres Strait Islander Partnerships and Minister Assisting the Premier.

In January 2015, Dempsey was defeated in the 2015 Queensland state election by Labor candidate Leanne Donaldson. Dempsey finished with the highest primary vote, however Donaldson was declared the winner following the distribution of preferences.

=== Local Government ===
On 19 March 2016, Dempsey was elected as Mayor of Bundaberg Regional Council, winning with approximately 71% of the primary vote.

As at May 2018, Dempsey is not a member of any political party.

He was re-elected as mayor in 2020 but lost in the 2024 election to Helen Blackburn.

=== Federal Politics ===
In March 2022 Dempsey announced he would be an independent candidate for the lower house seat of Hinkler at the 2022 federal election. He polled 13 percent of the vote, finishing third behind the LNP and Labor candidates.

Parliament of Queensland
Preceded by Nita Cunningham	Member for Bundaberg; 2006–2015	Succeeded by Leanne Donaldson
