= Chris Cummins (politician) =

Australian politician

Member of the Queensland Legislative Assembly for Kawana
- In office 17 February 2001 – 9 September 2006
- Preceded by: New seat
- Succeeded by: Steve Dickson

Personal details
- Born: Christopher Paul Cummins; 12 December 1962 (age 63) Ipswich, Queensland, Australia
- Party: Labor
- Occupation: Electrical Fitter/Mechanic, Owner/operator of a small freight business

Christopher Paul Cummins (born 12 December 1962) is an Australian politician. He was a Labor member of the Legislative Assembly of Queensland from 2001 to 2006.

Cummins first was first elected to parliament at the 2001 state election as the Labor candidate for Kawana. He was re-elected in the same capacity 2004 state election. Cummins won promotion to cabinet of Peter Beattie during his second term. He served as the Minister for Emergency Services from February 2004 to July 2005 and as the Minister for Small Business, Information Technology Policy and Multicultural Affairs from July 2005 to September 2006. At the 2006 state election, he was defeated by Liberal candidate Steve Dickson.

Cummins was the Labor candidate for Fisher at the 2010 federal election. He was defeated by incumbent Liberal MP Peter Slipper.

Prior to entering state politics, Cummins was a Caloundra City councillor from 1997 to 2001.

Cummins was born in Ipswich, Queensland. He is married with one son.

Parliament of Queensland
Preceded by New seat	Member for Kawana; 2001–2006	Succeeded by Steve Dickson
