= Alex Douglas (politician) =

Australian politician

Leader of the Palmer United Party in Queensland
- In office 6 June 2013 – 11 August 2014
- Deputy: Carl Judge
- Preceded by: Glenn Lazarus
- Succeeded by: Carl Judge

Member of the Queensland Legislative Assembly for Gaven
- In office 1 April 2006 – 9 September 2006
- Preceded by: Robert Poole
- Succeeded by: Phil Gray
- In office 21 March 2009 – 31 January 2015
- Preceded by: Phil Gray
- Succeeded by: Sid Cramp

Personal details
- Born: Alexander Rodney Douglas; 24 November 1958 (age 67) Brisbane, Queensland, Australia
- Party: Independent (2012–2013; 2014–present)
- Other political affiliations: National (before 2008); Liberal National (2008–2012); Palmer United (2013–2014)
- Relations: See Douglas family Bob Katter (uncle); Robbie Katter (cousin)
- Education: University of Queensland
- Occupation: General practitioner (Self–employed)
- Profession: Doctor; Politician

Alexander Rodney Douglas (born 24 November 1958) is a former Australian politician. He was a National Party member of the Queensland Legislative Assembly from April to September 2006, representing the electorate of Gaven. He was elected for the same seat as a Liberal National Party member in 2009, and re-elected in 2012.

In late 2012, he left the Liberal National Party to sit as an independent, and subsequently joined the United Australia Party, rebranded as the Palmer United Party (PUP), in June 2013, serving as its state leader. He resigned from the Palmer United Party in August 2014 and again sat as an independent for the final months of his term, but was defeated at the 2015 state election.

== Family and early career ==
Born in Brisbane, Douglas comes from a political family: his great-grandfather was John Douglas, Premier of Queensland from 1877 to 1879, and his grandfather was Henry Douglas, member for Cook from 1907 to 1915. Douglas is related to the current (12th) Marquess of Queensberry. His uncle is federal MP Bob Katter.

Educated at St Joseph's College, Gregory Terrace, and the University of Queensland, Douglas was a general practitioner and medical officer before entering parliament, and was deputy chair of the Queensland Division of General Practice. He was also on the Central Council of the National Party.

== Political career ==
In April 2006, Douglas was elected to the Legislative Assembly of Queensland in a by-election for the previously Labor-held seat of Gaven, representing the National Party. He was appointed Deputy Opposition Whip in August, but at the 2006 state election in September he was defeated by Labor candidate Phil Gray, the same candidate he had defeated earlier that year. Douglas contested the 2007 federal election as the National Party candidate for Fadden, but was defeated by the Liberal candidate Stuart Robert.

The 2009 state election saw Douglas pitted against Gray for the third consecutive time. On this occasion, Douglas, running under the banner of the newly formed Liberal National Party, narrowly emerged as the victor, reclaiming his old seat of Gaven.

On 16 June 2011, Douglas was appointed as the first non-government chair of the Parliamentary Crime and Misconduct Committee.

On 29 November 2012, following a dispute with LNP Premier Campbell Newman over his removal from membership of parliamentary committees, Douglas resigned from the LNP to sit as an independent.

On 30 April 2013, he joined the newly created United Australia Party, and became the Queensland leader of the party (quickly renamed the Palmer United Party) in June 2013.

Douglas resigned as leader in August 2014 to protest against his lack of involvement in the preselection of candidates for the 2015 Queensland state election. At the same time, he announced he was quitting the party as well, and would once again sit as an independent. Party founder and federal leader Clive Palmer, himself a Queenslander, countered that Douglas had been in talks to merge with Katter's Australian Party, led by his uncle.

Parliament of Queensland
Preceded by Robert Poole	Member for Gaven; 2006	Succeeded by Phil Gray
Preceded by Phil Gray	Member for Gaven; 2009–2015	Succeeded by Sid Cramp
