= Rob Messenger =

Australian politician

Deputy Leader of the Jacqui Lambie Network
- In office 14 May 2015 – 8 May 2016
- Leader: Jacqui Lambie
- Preceded by: Party established
- Succeeded by: Steve Martin
Opposition portfolios
Shadow Minister for Small Business and Tourism
In office 29 January 2008 – 5 April 2009
Leader	Lawrence Springborg
Preceded by	Vaughan Johnson (Small Business); Fiona Simpson (Tourism)
Succeeded by	Ray Stevens (Tourism)
Shadow Minister for Regional Development, and Industry and Shadow Minister for Aboriginal and Torres Strait Island Partnerships
In office 29 January 2008 – 12 August 2008
Leader	Lawrence Springborg
Preceded by	Vaughan Johnson
Succeeded by	Howard Hobbs (Regional Development); Jann Stuckey (Aboriginal and Torres Strait Island)
Shadow Minister for Police and Corrective Services
In office 21 September 2006 – 29 January 2008
Leader	Jeff Seeney
Preceded by	Vaughan Johnson
Succeeded by	Vaughan Johnson
Shadow Minister for Environment
In office 28 September 2005 – 21 September 2006
Leader	Lawrence Springborg
Preceded by	Vince Lester
Succeeded by	Rosemary Menkens
Shadow Minister for Education and The Arts
In office 8 March 2004 – 28 September 2005
Leader	Lawrence Springborg
Preceded by	Stuart Copeland (Education); Joan Sheldon (Arts)
Succeeded by	Stuart Copeland

Member of the Queensland Legislative Assembly for Burnett
- In office 7 February 2004 – 24 March 2012
- Preceded by: Trevor Strong
- Succeeded by: Stephen Bennett

Personal details
- Born: Robert Desmond Messenger; 26 October 1962 (age 64) Bundaberg, Queensland, Australia
- Party: Jacqui Lambie Network
- Other political affiliations: National (2001–2008); Liberal National (2008–2010); Independent (2010–2013); Palmer United (2013–2014)
- Education: North Bundaberg State School
- Occupation: Executive producer (WIN Television) (Seven Network); Electrical tradesperson (Royal Australian Air Force); Trades company director (Self-employed)
- Profession: Tradesman businessman politician

Military service
- Allegiance: Commonwealth of Australia
- Branch/service: Royal Australian Air Force
- Years of service: 1978–1987
- Rank: Corporal

Robert Desmond Messenger (born 26 October 1962) is an Australian politician. He was a member of the Legislative Assembly of Queensland representing the Electoral district of Burnett. Originally a member of the Queensland branch of the Nationals, he became a member of the Liberal National Party of Queensland when that party was formed from the union of the Queensland branches of the National Party and the Liberal Party in 2008. He resigned from the Liberal Nationals in 2010 and became an independent. He lost his seat to the LNP at the 2012 election. Since then he has been involved in the Palmer United Party and was an adviser to Tasmanian Senator Jacqui Lambie.

== Political career ==
Messenger, who had worked as an electrician both in the RAAF and through his own small business was chosen by the National Party to re-take the traditional safe seat of Burnett in the 2004 Queensland election. Burnett had been lost to the Labor Party in the 2001 Queensland state election. Messenger succeeded in winning Burnett from the Labor candidate Trevor Strong, managing a swing of 4.3 per cent.

He was re-elected in 2006 with an additional swing of 4.7 per cent.

=== Bundaberg Hospital Scandal ===
In 2005 Messenger was approached by Toni Hoffman, an experienced surgical nurse, distressed about one of the surgeons at the Bundaberg Base Hospital where she worked. She had previously consulted with hospital management with no success.

As a result of a long discussion with Hoffman, he named Jayant Patel under Parliamentary privilege. Messenger first raised the matter in Parliament on 22 March 2005, for the protection of patients at the Bundaberg Base Hospital intensive care unit and the wellbeing of the medical staff.

Shortly afterwards it was discovered by Courier Mail journalist Hedley Thomas that Patel had previously been charged with misconduct in the United States.

Patel's activities subsequently came into the public arena and he eventually became the central figure in the "Dr. Death" scandal which resulted in a Commission of Inquiry.

On 8 February 2007 Messenger was censured by the Queensland Parliament for a sarcastic comment made to the Premier over the scandal.

=== Resignation from LNP to sit as an independent ===
In May 2010, Messenger and Beaudesert MP Aidan McLindon resigned from the LNP to sit as Independents, claiming that the party had become victim to "flawed political process". Shortly afterwards it was revealed Messenger and McLindon were under party scrutiny, with Messenger's travel claims raising some concerns. Messenger denied that he had done anything wrong and called upon the LNP president Bruce McIvor to resign.

Messenger has campaigned for a sex offenders register that would allow parents to protect their children from known sexual offenders.

In June 2011, Messenger indicated interest in joining the newly formed Katter's Australian Party if his policy demands were met, including a ban on Sharia law in Australia, and an increase in military numbers.

Messenger lost his seat at the 2012 state election to his former party.

=== Palmer United ===
In May 2013, Messenger joined the Palmer United Party (now called the United Australia Party) and was announced as its first federal candidate, contesting the seat of Hinkler. He won 17.65% of the vote, coming third behind the LNP and Labor candidates. In April 2014 he was appointed chief of staff to incoming Palmer United senator Jacqui Lambie of Tasmania. Following tensions between Clive Palmer and Jacqui Lambie, he was expelled from the party in November 2014.

=== Electoral History ===
Queensland Legislative Assembly
Election year	Electorate	Party	Votes	FP%	+/-	2PP%	+/-	Result
2004	Burnett	Nat	12,526	52.60	▲4.30	52.60	▲4.30	First
2006	Burnett	Nat	14,469	57.60	▲5.00	57.60	▲5.00	First
2009	Burnett	LNP	15,055	56.60	▼0.80	61.10	▲3.70	First
2012	Burnett	Ind	6,821	24.00	▲24.00	41.50	▲41.50	Second

Australian House of Representatives
Election year	Electorate	Party	Votes	FP%	+/-	2PP%	+/-	Result
2013	Hinkler	PUP	14,990	17.65	▲17.65	N/A	N/A	Third

== Employment and termination in Senator Lambie’s office ==
Messenger was employed in Tasmanian Senator Jacqui Lambie’s office between 1 July 2014 and 3 May 2017 as her chief of staff. Messenger was terminated on 3 May 2017 for serious misconduct.

== Unsuccessful litigation against Commonwealth of Australia and Senator Lambie ==
Following Messenger’s termination in 2017, he and his wife Fern, who was Senator Lambie’s office manager, filed lawsuits in the Federal Court of Australia under the Fair Work Act 2009 against the Commonwealth of Australia and Senator Lambie. Both Messengers claimed “to have exercised workplace rights; and that the adverse action to which they were each subjected was taken against them in contravention” of Australian federal law.

The Federal Court had 16 days of public hearings in 2020 and 2021 with various witnesses appearing. On 10 June 2022, Justice John Snaden of the Federal Court issued a published judgement, Messenger v Commonwealth of Australia [2022] FCA 677, dismissing both Messengers cases finding that “Mr and Mrs Messenger did not present as credible witnesses.” Justice Snaden found that “there is no doubt, at the time of their dismissals, each of Mr and Mrs Messenger was guilty of serious misconduct.”

In June 2022, the Messengers' unsuccessful lawsuits drew national news and were reported extensively by various Australian media outlets. The Daily Telegraph reported that Justice Snaden observed “despite repeated warnings the Messengers appeared at times determined to turn the trial into some kind of broad ranging judicial inquiry in Senator Lambie’s character, or which is worse, in a trial by media."

Parliament of Queensland
Preceded by Trevor Strong	Member for Burnett; 2004–2012	Succeeded by Stephen Bennett
