= Robert Poole (politician) =

Australian politician

Member of the Queensland Legislative Assembly for Gaven
- In office 17 February 2001 – 28 February 2006
- Preceded by: New seat
- Succeeded by: Alex Douglas

Personal details
- Born: Robert Lindsay Poole; 12 June 1948 (age 78) Loxton, South Australia
- Party: Labor
- Occupation: Workplace Health and Safety Officer, Lecturer

Robert Lindsay Poole (born 12 June 1948 in Loxton, South Australia) was a controversial Queensland Labor politician from 2001 until his resignation in early 2006.

Poole was elected to the Legislative Assembly of Queensland as member for the Gold Coast based seat of Gaven at the Beattie Labor Government's landslide 2001 state election victory. Poole was returned at the 2004 state election with a smaller margin.

In February 2006, Poole's extended absences from his electorate, because his wife and children live in Thailand, were widely publicised. Additionally, it was revealed that the MP would take up to three months off to have a knee reconstruction in Thailand. Poole and Beattie, his party leader, drew strong criticism for this decision to allow Poole to remain overseas for so long. Beattie appointed the member for Ipswich West, Don Livingstone, to mind Poole's seat in his absence, only to find out that Livingstone had also been spending time in Thailand visiting Poole, his friend and business associate.

On 25 February, Beattie ordered Poole to return from his latest trip by early April or a by-election would be called in Gaven. Poole subsequently withdrew his candidacy for the seat at the next state election. When Parliament resumed, Poole wrote to Beattie, resigning immediately as the member for Gaven on 28 February 2006.

In 2010, Poole faced charges of cheating and fraud before a Thai court, over his involvement with energy company Envee Energy Australia. In March 2011, the court acquitted Poole of all charges.

== See also ==
- Members of the Queensland Legislative Assembly, 2004–2006
- Members of the Queensland Legislative Assembly, 2001–2004

Parliament of Queensland
New seat	Member for Gaven; 2001–2006	Succeeded by Alex Douglas
