= Nita Cunningham =

Australian politician

The Hon Nita Cunningham

Member of the Queensland Legislative Assembly for Bundaberg
- In office 13 June 1998 – 14 August 2006
- Preceded by: Clem Campbell
- Succeeded by: Jack Dempsey

Personal details
- Born: 12 February 1939 Bundaberg, Queensland, Australia
- Died: 7 February 2015 (aged 75)
- Party: Labor
- Occupation: Politician

Junita Irene "Nita" Cunningham (12 February 1939 – 7 February 2015) was a member of the Legislative Assembly of Queensland. She was first elected in 1998 as the member for Bundaberg. A former minister for Local Government and Planning, her resignation in 2006 due to severe skin cancer triggered the 2006 Queensland state election.

Parliament of Queensland
Preceded by Clem Campbell	Member for Bundaberg; 1998–2006	Succeeded by Jack Dempsey
