= Stuart Copeland =

Australian politician (born 1968)

Shadow Attorney-General Shadow Minister for Justice
- In office 12 August 2008 – 30 September 2008
- Leader: Lawrence Springborg
- Preceded by: Mark McArdle
- Succeeded by: Mike Horan

Manager of Opposition Business in Queensland
- In office 29 January 2007 – 30 September 2008
- Leader: Jeff Seeney; Lawrence Springborg
- Preceded by: Kev Lingard
- Succeeded by: John-Paul Langbroek

Shadow Minister for Education
- In office 28 September 2005 – 30 September 2008
- Leader: Lawrence Springborg; Jeff Seeney
- Preceded by: Rob Messenger
- Succeeded by: John-Paul Langbroek
- In office 9 February 2003 – 8 March 2004
- Leader: Lawrence Springborg
- Preceded by: Kev Lingard
- Succeeded by: Rob Messenger

Shadow Minister for Health
- In office 8 March 2004 – 28 September 2005
- Leader: Lawrence Springborg
- Preceded by: Fiona Simpson
- Succeeded by: Bruce Flegg

Member of the Queensland Legislative Assembly for Cunningham
- In office 17 February 2001 – 20 March 2009
- Preceded by: Tony Elliott
- Succeeded by: Seat abolished

Personal details
- Born: Stuart William Copeland; 19 January 1968 (age 58) Taroom, Queensland, Australia
- Party: Liberal National Party
- Other political affiliations: National Party, Independent
- Spouse: Rae McCaull
- Occupation: Petroleum industry

Stuart William Copeland (born 19 January 1968) is an Australian politician. He was a National/Liberal National MP from 2001 to 2009, representing the district of Cunningham.

== Political career ==
Copeland won preselection to contest the state seat of Cunningham for the National Party, defeating the Mayor of the Jondaryan Shire Peter Taylor. Taylor went on to be elected Mayor of the Toowoomba Regional Council in 2008.

Copeland was elected at the February 2001 state election after a three cornered contest with the Liberal Party. He was one of only 11 National Party MPs to form the official Opposition following Premier Peter Beattie's landslide win gaining 66 seats in the 89 seat Assembly. Ray Hopper MP, elected as an independent for the seat of Darling Downs, joined the Nationals in December 2001.

Copeland was appointed Shadow Minister for Families, Disabilities, Youth and The Arts, and went on to hold the portfolios of Education, Training, Multicultural Policy, Health, Open Government, Justice and Attorney General.

He served on the Criminal Justice Committee, the Crime and Misconduct Committee, the Public Works Committee, the Broadcast of Parliament Select Committee, and various Parliamentary Estimates Committees. He was also Shadow Cabinet Secretary and served as Temporary Speaker/Deputy Speaker.

In 2007 Copeland was appointed Leader of Opposition Business.

=== Jayant Patel ===
During Question Time on 22 March 2005, as Shadow Minister for Health, Copeland asked the then Minister for Health, Gordon Nuttall MP, a question on an internal Queensland Health investigation into allegations against the competence of Jayant Patel, a surgeon at Bundaberg Base Hospital. Soon after that morning's Question Time, the Member for Burnett, Rob Messenger MP, made a five-minute ‘Matters of Public Interest’ speech. The speech contained serious allegations against the clinical competence of a Dr Patel, an overseas trained surgeon working at the Bundaberg Base Hospital.

The Doctor Death scandal and other problems within Queensland Health dominated Queensland politics for a significant period.

=== Gordon Nuttall ===
On Friday 8 July 2005, in a public hearing of a Queensland parliamentary estimates committee, 'Estimates Committee D - Health', Copeland questioned Health Minister Gordon Nuttall over his knowledge of the problems surrounding the proficiencies of Overseas Trained Doctors. At the time, the minister was accompanied by senior officers of Queensland Health, including the then Director General of Queensland Health (Dr Buckland) and the then Senior Executive Director, Health Services (Dr Scott).

Nuttall denied ever having been briefed on problems associated with Overseas Trained Doctors, but was directly contradicted by Dr Scott who advised the committee that Nuttall had been briefed. This led to accusations Nuttall had lied to the committee, then an offence under Section 57 of the Queenslands Criminal Code.

In August 2005, Nuttall stepped aside from the Ministry while the Crime and Misconduct Commission (CMC) investigated claims he had given a false answer to a Parliamentary estimates committee regarding his prior knowledge of problems with overseas-trained doctors. The Commission reported back in December 2005, recommending the Attorney-General prosecute Nuttall under section 57 of the Criminal Code. The prosecution was not proceeded with as Premier Beattie recalled Parliament to revoke the relevant section of the Criminal Code so Parliament could deal with such matters itself under contempt of parliament provisions.

Nuttall resigned from the Ministry on 7 December 2005. As a result of the Nuttall case, lying to Parliament remained a powerful political issue in Queensland with the LNP promising during the 2012 election campaign to re-introduce laws to make it illegal to lie to Parliament. They delivered on that promise in August 2012.

== Redistribution ==
In the State electoral redistribution prior to the 2009 Queensland election, the electorate of Cunningham was abolished and divided between the existing electorates of Toowoomba South and Southern Downs and the new electorate of Condamine.

Under the terms of the constitution of the newly formed LNP following the amalgamation of the National and Liberal Parties in Queensland, all sitting Members of Parliament, State and Federal, were automatically endorsed (or “grandfathered”) for their next election. In the case of a redistribution the LNP's constitution stated “If a redistribution changes the boundaries of a current State or Federal electorate, the sitting Member will be entitled to claim the electorate that contains 50.1% of the enrolments in the member’s old seat and contest it as the sole candidate of the Party for that seat at the next State or Federal election”.

The majority of the new Condamine's voters came from Darling Downs, held by fellow LNP member Ray Hopper, who like Copeland was from the National side of the merger. Under LNP rules, Hopper was automatically preselected for Condamine, and Copeland was effectively barred from standing for the LNP in any seat containing part of the now-abolished Cunningham.

It had been reported that former opposition leader Mike Horan, the member for Toowoomba South, had intended to retire and hand his seat to Copeland. However, this did not eventuate and Copeland was left without a seat.

Despite having previously been nominated by Lawrence Springborg as a potential leader, Copeland announced he would be retiring and moved to the backbench.

=== 2009 Queensland election ===
At the beginning of the election campaign, Copeland resigned from the LNP and announced his intention to stand as an independent in Condamine. He pushed Labor into third place on the primary vote, but was soundly defeated by Hopper when all preferences were distributed.

== Post-Parliament ==
Following his departure from Parliament, Copeland was employed by the University of Southern Queensland as the Principal Manager, Government and Community in USQ's Office of External Relations.

In September 2009, the Bligh Government appointed Copeland to serve as a Director on the Board of Powerlink, a Government Owned Corporation.

In 2011, Copeland was appointed as State Director of The Nationals in Victoria.

Copeland is married to Rae McCaull, a former State Secretary of The Nationals in Queensland, and they have two children.

== Prior to parliament ==
- State President Queensland Young Nationals 1997/1998
- Vice President Federal Young Nationals 1997/1998
- Chief Executive Officer of the Royal Agricultural Society of Queensland
- Employed by Shell Company Of Australia

== See also ==
- Members of the Queensland Legislative Assembly, 2004-2006
- Toowoomba (The seat of Cunningham lies in part in the city's southern suburbs.)

Parliament of Queensland
Preceded by Tony Elliott	Member for Cunningham; 2001–2009	Abolished
