= Electoral district of Gaven =

State electoral district of Queensland, Australia

Gaven Queensland—Legislative Assembly
- Map of the electoral district of Gaven, 2017
- State: Queensland
- Dates current: 2001–present
- MP: Meaghan Scanlon
- Party: Labor
- Namesake: Gaven Way (a section of the Pacific Motorway)
- Electors: 33,051 (2020)
- Area: 77 km^{2} (29.7 sq mi)
- Demographic: Outer-metropolitan
- Coordinates: 27°58′S 153°17′E
Electorates around Gaven:
| Theodore | Theodore | Bonney |
| Mudgeeraba | Gaven | Southport |
| Mudgeeraba | Mudgeeraba | Surfers Paradise |

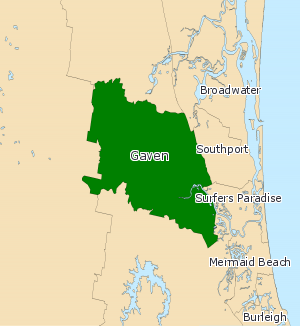
2008 map.

Gaven /ˈɡeɪvən/ is an electoral district of the Legislative Assembly in the Australian state of Queensland. It was created out of the former district of Nerang and the southern segment of Albert in the 2001 redistribution, and encompasses the northern growth corridor of the Gold Coast. The current Member of Parliament is Meaghan Scanlon of the Labor Party. It is currently the only Labor-held seat on the Gold Coast.

== History ==
Gaven was created in 1999, named after the Gaven Way (a section of the Pacific Motorway). When it was created, it was a notionally conservative seat, part of the old South Coast electorate held for 14 years by Russ Hinze (commonly known as Sir Joh's "Minister for Everything"), and was contested for the conservative National Party by the incumbent member for Albert, Bill Baumann, at the 2001 election. However, amid a statewide landslide victory for the Labor Party, the seat fell to union organiser Robert Poole with a 14.6% swing. The National Party agreed to let their coalition partner, the more urban Liberal Party contest the seat at the 2004 election, and though they nominated former Gold Coast mayor Ray Stevens, Poole was returned with only a slight swing against him.

Poole became the subject of increasing controversy during his second term, as he spent much of his term out of the state, living with his family in Thailand. This reached its peak in 2006 when Poole revealed that he intended to spend the first half the year in Thailand while he recovered from surgery. A furious Premier Peter Beattie demanded that Poole return or face having his seat formally declared vacant, and Poole subsequently resigned from the seat in late February.

The Liberal-National Coalition made the decision for the National Party, not the Liberals, to contest the seat at the by-election, which was won by around 1,500 votes by Alex Douglas, the National Party candidate, over Labor’s Phil Gray.

The 2006 state election saw Alex Douglas and Phil Gray once again running against each other. Phil Gray won the seat for Labor by a little under 2,000 votes.

The 2009 state election saw Douglas and Gray pitted against each other for a third consecutive time. On this occasion, Douglas, running under the banner of the newly formed Liberal National Party, narrowly emerged as the victor.

Meaghan Scanlon became the first woman to represent the seat, winning the seat for Labor in 2017 and holding it with a swing in her favour at the 2020 Queensland election. Upon victory in the 2024 state election, Scanlon became the longest serving MP for the seat of Gaven.

Despite notionally being considered conservative when it was first established in 2001, as of 2025 the seat of Gaven has been held by the Labor party for 16 of its 24 years of existence.

== Members for Gaven ==
| Member | Party | Term |
|---|---|---|
| Robert Poole | Labor | 2001–2006 |
| Alex Douglas | National | 2006–2006 |
| Phil Gray | Labor | 2006–2009 |
| Alex Douglas | Liberal National | 2009–2012 |
| Alex Douglas | Independent | 2012–2013 |
| Alex Douglas | Palmer United | 2013–2014 |
| Alex Douglas | Independent | 2014–2015 |
| Sid Cramp | Liberal National | 2015–2017 |
| Meaghan Scanlon | Labor | 2017–present |

== Election results ==
2024 Queensland state election: Gaven
| Party | Candidate | Votes | % | ±% |
|---|---|---|---|---|
| Labor | Meaghan Scanlon | 12,057 | 41.34 | −6.06 |
| Liberal National | Bianca Stone | 11,343 | 38.89 | +5.79 |
| One Nation | Sandy Roach | 2,440 | 8.37 | +0.07 |
| Greens | Sally Spain | 1,515 | 5.19 | −0.31 |
| Legalise Cannabis | Jenelle Porter | 1,240 | 4.25 | +0.35 |
| Family First | Ian Reid | 573 | 1.96 | +1.96 |
| Total formal votes | | 29,168 | 95.45 | +0.40 |
| Informal votes | | 1,389 | 4.55 | −0.40 |
| Turnout | | 30,557 | 87.33 | +0.61 |
Two-party-preferred result
| Labor | Meaghan Scanlon | 14,780 | 50.67 | −7.13 |
| Liberal National | Bianca Stone | 14,388 | 49.33 | +7.13 |
| Labor hold | | Swing | −7.13 | |

== See also ==
- Queensland Legislative Assembly electoral districts
