= Ian Rickuss =

Australian politician

Member of the Queensland Legislative Assembly for Lockyer
- In office 7 February 2004 – 25 November 2017
- Preceded by: Bill Flynn
- Succeeded by: Jim McDonald

Personal details
- Born: 27 July 1954 (age 71) Brisbane, Queensland, Australia
- Party: The Nationals (2004–2008); Liberal National (2008–present)
- Spouse: Ann Rickuss
- Occupation: Bank clerk, horticulturist

Ian Phillip Rickuss (born 27 July 1954) is an Australian politician. Born in Brisbane, he was a bank clerk and horticulturist before entering politics. In 2004, he was elected to the Legislative Assembly of Queensland as the National Party member for Lockyer, defeating the sitting member, One Nation leader Bill Flynn. Rickuss was appointed Opposition Whip on 1 July 2006. In 2008, he joined the Liberal National Party when the Liberal Party and National Party merged in Queensland.

Rickuss survived a pre-selection challenge in 2011.

He retired at the 2017 election.

Rickuss is married to Ann and has two sons, Luke and Joel.

Parliament of Queensland
Preceded by Bill Flynn	Member for Lockyer; 2004–2017	Succeeded by Jim McDonald
