= Results of the 2012 Queensland state election =

Parliament of Queensland, Assembly election, 24 March 2012 Legislative Assembly << 2009–2015 >>
Enrolled voters	2,746,844				
Votes cast	2,499,612		Turnout	91.00	+0.07
Informal votes	53,797		Informal	2.15	+0.21
Summary of votes by party
Party	Primary votes	%	Swing	Seats	Change
Liberal National	1,214,402	49.65	+8.05	78	+44
Labor	652,092	26.66	–15.59	7	–44
Katter's Australian Party	282,098	11.53	+11.53	2	+2
Greens	184,147	7.53	–0.84	0	±0
Family First	33,269	1.36	+0.54	0	±0
One Nation	2,525	0.10	–0.28	0	±0
Independent	77,282	3.16	–3.42	2	–2
Total	2,445,815			89	

This is a list of electoral district results for the Queensland 2012 election.

== Results by Electoral district ==
=== Albert ===
2012 Queensland state election: Albert
Party	Candidate	Votes	%	±%
Liberal National	Mark Boothman	13,888	49.59	+10.43
Labor	Margaret Keech	7,943	28.36	−21.69
Katter's Australian	Adam Hollis	3,045	10.87	+10.87
Family First	Amanda Best	1,620	5.78	+5.78
Greens	Petrina Maizey	1,511	5.40	−1.68
Total formal votes		28,007	97.17	−0.33
Informal votes		817	2.83	+0.33
Turnout		28,824	91.43	+1.13
Two-party-preferred result
Liberal National	Mark Boothman	15,198	61.89	+18.36
Labor	Margaret Keech	9,358	38.11	−18.36
Liberal National gain from Labor		Swing	+18.36	

=== Algester ===
2012 Queensland state election: Algester
Party	Candidate	Votes	%	±%
Liberal National	Anthony Shorten	13,687	50.72	+15.22
Labor	Karen Struthers	9,134	33.85	−18.78
Katter's Australian	Gavan Duffy	2,286	8.47	+8.47
Greens	Justin Kerr	1,877	6.96	−0.47
Total formal votes		26,984	97.33	−0.38
Informal votes		740	2.67	+0.38
Turnout		27,724	92.82	+0.99
Two-party-preferred result
Liberal National	Anthony Shorten	14,735	59.15	+18.36
Labor	Karen Struthers	10,177	40.85	−18.36
Liberal National gain from Labor		Swing	+18.36	

=== Ashgrove ===
2012 Queensland state election: Ashgrove
Party	Candidate	Votes	%	±%
Liberal National	Campbell Newman	14,932	51.81	+14.55
Labor	Kate Jones	10,549	36.60	−9.11
Greens	Sandra Bayley	2,644	9.17	−3.23
Katter's Australian	Norman Wicks	478	1.66	+1.66
Independent	Trevor Jones	156	0.54	+0.54
One Nation	Ian Nelson	64	0.22	+0.22
Total formal votes		28,823	99.22	+0.43
Informal votes		227	0.78	−0.43
Turnout		29,050	92.40	+0.73
Two-party-preferred result
Liberal National	Campbell Newman	15,537	55.70	+12.80
Labor	Kate Jones	12,358	44.30	−12.80
Liberal National gain from Labor		Swing	+12.80	

=== Aspley ===
2012 Queensland state election: Aspley
Party	Candidate	Votes	%	±%
Liberal National	Tracy Davis	17,923	65.43	+15.45
Labor	Oskar Bronowicki	6,449	23.54	−17.27
Greens	David Forrest	2,035	7.43	+0.58
Family First	Allan Vincent	985	3.60	+1.24
Total formal votes		27,392	98.40	−0.10
Informal votes		445	1.60	+0.10
Turnout		27,837	94.42	+1.29
Two-party-preferred result
Liberal National	Tracy Davis	18,718	71.75	+17.29
Labor	Oskar Bronowicki	7,370	28.25	−17.29
Liberal National hold		Swing	+17.29	

=== Barron River ===
2012 Queensland state election: Barron River
Party	Candidate	Votes	%	±%
Liberal National	Michael Trout	13,652	45.71	+1.88
Labor	Steve Wettenhall	8,317	27.85	−15.40
Katter's Australian	Brendan Fitzgerald	4,732	15.84	+15.84
Greens	Elaine Harding	2,736	9.16	−3.76
North Queensland	Mike Squire	431	1.44	+1.44
Total formal votes		29,868	97.76	+0.21
Informal votes		685	2.24	−0.21
Turnout		30,553	89.47	−0.17
Two-party-preferred result
Liberal National	Michael Trout	15,406	59.48	+11.80
Labor	Steve Wettenhall	10,494	40.52	−11.80
Liberal National gain from Labor		Swing	+11.80	

=== Beaudesert ===
2012 Queensland state election: Beaudesert
Party	Candidate	Votes	%	±%
Liberal National	Jon Krause	13,835	47.11	+9.21
Katter's Australian	Aidan McLindon	7,744	26.37	+26.37
Labor	Brett McCreadie	4,105	13.98	−10.96
Greens	Andy Grodecki	2,448	8.34	+1.36
One Nation	Jim Savage	760	2.59	+2.59
Family First	Walter Abrahamson	478	1.63	+1.63
Total formal votes		29,370	97.84	−0.43
Informal votes		648	2.16	+0.43
Turnout		30,018	92.57	+0.39
Two-party-preferred result
Liberal National	Jon Krause	14,836	60.56	+2.25
Katter's Australian	Aidan McLindon	9,661	39.44	+39.44
Liberal National hold		Swing	+2.25	

=== Brisbane Central ===
2012 Queensland state election: Brisbane Central
Party	Candidate	Votes	%	±%
Liberal National	Robert Cavallucci	12,201	48.70	+11.46
Labor	Grace Grace	8,435	33.67	−8.49
Greens	Anne Boccabella	3,842	15.33	−1.67
Queensland Party	Ruth Bonnett	576	2.30	+2.30
Total formal votes		25,054	98.35	−0.15
Informal votes		420	1.65	+0.15
Turnout		25,474	86.89	+0.52
Two-party-preferred result
Liberal National	Robert Cavallucci	12,689	54.88	+10.85
Labor	Grace Grace	10,432	45.12	−10.85
Liberal National gain from Labor		Swing	+10.85	

=== Broadwater ===
2012 Queensland state election: Broadwater
Party	Candidate	Votes	%	±%
Liberal National	Verity Barton	13,583	51.30	+7.37
Labor	Peta-Kaye Croft	8,378	31.64	−15.17
Katter's Australian	Peter McCambridge	1,408	5.32	+5.32
Independent	Ron Clarke	1,219	4.60	+4.60
Greens	James Brydges	851	3.21	−1.78
Independent	Liz Pforr	552	2.08	+2.08
Family First	Ben O'Brien	485	1.83	+1.83
Total formal votes		26,476	97.71	−0.13
Informal votes		620	2.29	+0.13
Turnout		27,096	88.57	−0.09
Two-party-preferred result
Liberal National	Verity Barton	14,513	61.29	+13.32
Labor	Peta-Kaye Croft	9,167	38.71	−13.32
Liberal National gain from Labor		Swing	+13.32	

=== Buderim ===
2012 Queensland state election: Buderim
Party	Candidate	Votes	%	±%
Liberal National	Steve Dickson	16,056	62.17	+5.15
Labor	Chris Moore	4,181	16.19	−13.26
Greens	Susan Etheridge	2,749	10.64	+2.39
Katter's Australian	Lynette Bishop	2,003	7.76	+7.76
Family First	Tony Moore	838	3.24	+0.81
Total formal votes		25,827	98.04	−0.30
Informal votes		516	1.96	+0.30
Turnout		26,343	89.76	−1.10
Two-party-preferred result
Liberal National	Steve Dickson	17,329	76.01	+11.73
Labor	Chris Moore	5,469	23.99	−11.73
Liberal National hold		Swing	+11.73	

=== Bulimba ===
2012 Queensland state election: Bulimba
Party	Candidate	Votes	%	±%
Liberal National	Aaron Dillaway	13,244	46.70	+9.63
Labor	Di Farmer	12,169	42.91	−4.83
Greens	Justin Bennett	2,947	10.39	−1.25
Total formal votes		28,360	98.27	−0.17
Informal votes		499	1.73	+0.17
Turnout		28,859	91.11	+1.10
Two-party-preferred result
Liberal National	Aaron Dillaway	13,690	50.14	+7.91
Labor	Di Farmer	13,615	49.86	−7.91
Liberal National gain from Labor		Swing	+7.91	

=== Bundaberg ===
2012 Queensland state election: Bundaberg
Party	Candidate	Votes	%	±%
Liberal National	Jack Dempsey	14,193	53.16	−0.55
Labor	Cindy Hyland	6,335	23.73	−17.85
Katter's Australian	Doug Anderson	4,117	15.42	+15.42
Family First	Trevor Versace	841	3.15	+3.15
Greens	Peter Higgins	785	2.94	−1.77
Independent	Peter Wyatt	428	1.60	+1.60
Total formal votes		26,699	97.59	−0.51
Informal votes		658	2.41	+0.51
Turnout		27,357	91.38	−0.42
Two-party-preferred result
Liberal National	Jack Dempsey	15,900	68.17	+12.15
Labor	Cindy Hyland	7,423	31.83	−12.15
Liberal National hold		Swing	+12.15	

=== Bundamba ===
2012 Queensland state election: Bundamba
Party	Candidate	Votes	%	±%
Labor	Jo-Ann Miller	10,945	38.93	−22.39
Liberal National	Michael Kitzelmann	10,022	35.65	+12.48
Katter's Australian	Bernard Gaynor	2,461	8.75	+8.75
Independent	Angela Watson	2,213	7.87	+7.87
Greens	Jim Prentice	1,445	5.14	−2.03
Family First	Deborah Acason	897	3.19	+0.55
Independent	Alf Viskers	132	0.47	+0.47
Total formal votes		28,115	97.38	−0.22
Informal votes		756	2.62	+0.22
Turnout		28,871	91.08	+0.58
Two-party-preferred result
Labor	Jo-Ann Miller	12,354	51.82	−19.41
Liberal National	Michael Kitzelmann	11,486	48.18	+19.41
Labor hold		Swing	−19.41	

=== Burdekin ===
2012 Queensland state election: Burdekin
Party	Candidate	Votes	%	±%
Liberal National	Rosemary Menkens	12,873	47.99	−2.49
Katter's Australian	Ronald Wadforth	7,044	26.26	+26.26
Labor	Angela Zyla	5,520	20.58	−23.18
Greens	Pete Johnson	732	2.73	−3.03
Family First	Amanda Nickson	655	2.44	+2.44
Total formal votes		26,824	98.10	−0.10
Informal votes		489	1.90	+0.10
Turnout		27,107	90.96	−0.45
Two-party-preferred result
Liberal National	Rosemary Menkens	13,808	62.47	+9.32
Katter's Australian	Ronald Wadforth	8,294	37.53	+37.53
Liberal National hold		Swing	+9.32	

=== Burleigh ===
2012 Queensland state election: Burleigh
Party	Candidate	Votes	%	±%
Liberal National	Michael Hart	14,222	51.18	+12.30
Labor	Christine Smith	8,572	30.85	−15.96
Greens	Jane Power	2,345	8.44	+0.79
Katter's Australian	Dean Fisher	1,976	7.11	+7.11
Family First	Jeremy Fredericks	671	2.41	+0.50
Total formal votes		27,786	98.03	+0.21
Informal votes		559	1.97	−0.21
Turnout		28,345	88.41	−0.44
Two-party-preferred result
Liberal National	Michael Hart	15,324	61.05	+15.95
Labor	Christine Smith	9,778	38.95	−15.95
Liberal National gain from Labor		Swing	+15.95	

=== Burnett ===
2012 Queensland state election: Burnett
Party	Candidate	Votes	%	±%
Liberal National	Stephen Bennett	11,368	40.01	−16.64
Independent	Rob Messenger	6,821	24.00	+24.00
Labor	Stuart Tomlinson	4,618	16.25	−18.39
Katter's Australian	Kevin Pauling	4,542	15.98	+15.98
Greens	David Eastland	1,066	3.75	−1.23
Total formal votes		28,415	97.91	−0.16
Informal votes		608	2.09	+0.16
Turnout		29,023	91.88	−0.19
Two-party-preferred result
Liberal National	Stephen Bennett	13,110	58.50	−2.60
Independent	Rob Messenger	9,302	41.50	+41.50
Liberal National hold		Swing	N/A	

=== Cairns ===
2012 Queensland state election: Cairns
Party	Candidate	Votes	%	±%
Liberal National	Gavin King	11,632	42.51	+2.76
Labor	Kirsten Lesina	7,520	27.48	−18.30
Katter's Australian	Darren Hunt	5,125	18.73	+18.73
Greens	Geoff Holland	1,946	7.11	−3.85
North Queensland	John Piva	1,141	4.17	+4.17
Total formal votes		27,364	97.68	+0.09
Informal votes		663	2.32	−0.09
Turnout		28,015	87.83	+0.99
Two-party-preferred result
Liberal National	Gavin King	13,573	58.87	+13.02
Labor	Kirsten Lesina	9,481	41.13	−13.02
Liberal National gain from Labor		Swing	+13.02	

=== Callide ===
2012 Queensland state election: Callide
Party	Candidate	Votes	%	±%
Liberal National	Jeff Seeney	14,666	53.33	−5.65
Katter's Australian	Steve Ensby	7,318	26.61	+26.61
Labor	Melissa Newton	4,058	14.76	−9.16
Greens	Camilla Percy	892	3.24	−0.59
Independent	Duncan Scott	597	2.06	+2.06
Total formal votes		27,501	98.46	−0.13
Informal votes		397	1.54	+0.13
Turnout		27,501	92.32	−0.57
Two-party-preferred result
Liberal National	Jeff Seeney	15,224	63.51	−5.85
Katter's Australian	Steve Ensby	8,747	36.49	+36.49
Liberal National hold		Swing	−5.85	

=== Caloundra ===
2012 Queensland state election: Caloundra
Party	Candidate	Votes	%	±%
Liberal National	Mark McArdle	17,280	64.22	+14.16
Labor	Christine Anthony	6,037	22.44	−14.41
Greens	Allan McKay	3,589	13.34	+3.71
Total formal votes		26,906	97.40	−0.69
Informal votes		718	2.60	+0.69
Turnout		27,624	91.47	+0.42
Two-party-preferred result
Liberal National	Mark McArdle	17,915	71.23	+15.03
Labor	Christine Anthony	7,236	28.77	−15.03
Liberal National hold		Swing	+15.03	

=== Capalaba ===
2012 Queensland state election: Capalaba
Party	Candidate	Votes	%	±%
Liberal National	Steve Davies	13,345	46.54	+9.63
Labor	Michael Choi	11,004	38.37	−14.90
Greens	Penny Allman-Payne	2,168	7.56	−2.26
Katter's Australian	Graeme Moorhouse	1,708	5.96	+5.96
One Nation	David Chidgey	450	1.57	+1.57
Total formal votes		28,675	97.49	−0.45
Informal votes		738	2.51	+0.45
Turnout		29,413	92.97	+0.28
Two-party-preferred result
Liberal National	Steve Davies	14,144	53.73	+13.40
Labor	Michael Choi	12,182	46.27	−13.40
Liberal National gain from Labor		Swing	+13.40	

=== Chatsworth ===
2012 Queensland state election: Chatsworth
Party	Candidate	Votes	%	±%
Liberal National	Steve Minnikin	16,390	55.82	+10.78
Labor	Steve Kilburn	8,694	29.61	−14.26
Katter's Australian	Sarah Henry	1,856	6.32	+6.32
Greens	Jason Cooney	1,836	6.25	−0.79
Family First	Axel Beard	585	1.99	+1.99
Total formal votes		29,361	98.13	−0.11
Informal votes		559	1.87	+0.11
Turnout		29,920	91.89	−0.98
Two-party-preferred result
Liberal National	Steve Minnikin	17,464	63.94	+14.08
Labor	Steve Kilburn	9,848	36.06	−14.08
Liberal National gain from Labor		Swing	+14.08	

=== Clayfield ===
2012 Queensland state election: Clayfield
Party	Candidate	Votes	%	±%
Liberal National	Tim Nicholls	17,468	62.33	+13.09
Labor	Brent Davidson	6,115	21.60	−14.94
Greens	Luke Morey	3,068	10.84	+0.17
Katter's Australian	Will Keenan	1,483	5.24	+5.24
Total formal votes		28,314	98.37	−0.28
Informal votes		470	1.63	+0.28
Turnout		28,784	91.30	+0.14
Two-party-preferred result
Liberal National	Tim Nicholls	18,597	70.56	+14.72
Labor	Brent Davidson	7,760	29.44	−14.72
Liberal National hold		Swing	+14.72	

=== Cleveland ===
2012 Queensland state election: Cleveland
Party	Candidate	Votes	%	±%
Liberal National	Mark Robinson	18,497	61.89	+15.88
Labor	Jo Briskey	7,903	26.44	−17.14
Greens	Brad Scott	2,263	7.57	+0.54
Independent	Ronald Lambert	1,223	4.09	+4.09
Total formal votes		29,886	98.02	−0.21
Informal votes		603	1.98	+0.21
Turnout		30,489	93.01	+0.44
Two-party-preferred result
Liberal National	Mark Robinson	19,185	68.10	+17.82
Labor	Jo Briskey	8,986	31.90	−17.82
Liberal National hold		Swing	+17.82	

=== Condamine ===
2012 Queensland state election: Condamine
Party	Candidate	Votes	%	±%
Liberal National	Ray Hopper	18,409	58.30	+10.64
Katter's Australian	John Mathison	6,732	21.32	+21.32
Labor	Nev Swan	4,471	14.16	−5.48
Greens	Gabriele Tabikh	1,273	4.03	+0.68
Independent	Shane White	691	2.19	+2.19
Total formal votes		31,576	98.02	−0.38
Informal votes		637	1.98	+0.38
Turnout		32,213	94.19	+0.46
Two-party-preferred result
Liberal National	Ray Hopper	19,324	70.10	+8.54
Katter's Australian	John Mathison	8,242	29.90	+29.90
Liberal National hold		Swing	+8.54	

=== Cook ===
2012 Queensland state election: Cook
Party	Candidate	Votes	%	±%
Liberal National	David Kempton	8,832	37.51	−4.90
Labor	Jason O'Brien	7,634	32.42	−13.63
Katter's Australian	Lachlan Bensted	5,261	22.34	+22.34
Greens	George Riley	1,295	5.50	−1.15
One Nation	James Evans	524	2.23	+2.23
Total formal votes		23,546	98.49	+0.29
Informal votes		361	1.51	−0.29
Turnout		23,907	86.26	+0.43
Two-party-preferred result
Liberal National	David Kempton	10,563	53.43	+5.67
Labor	Jason O'Brien	9,205	46.57	−5.67
Liberal National gain from Labor		Swing	+5.67	

=== Coomera ===
2012 Queensland state election: Coomera
Party	Candidate	Votes	%	±%
Liberal National	Michael Crandon	17,951	61.89	+14.76
Labor	Graeme Higgs	5,771	19.90	−22.93
Katter's Australian	Peter Cobb	2,902	10.01	+10.01
Greens	Chris Wisbey	1,751	6.04	−0.11
Democratic Labor	Rowan Harrip	628	2.17	+2.17
Total formal votes		29,003	97.30	−0.18
Informal votes		805	2.70	+0.18
Turnout		29,808	90.63	+1.03
Two-party-preferred result
Liberal National	Michael Crandon	18,932	73.26	+21.35
Labor	Graeme Higgs	6,910	26.74	−21.35
Liberal National hold		Swing	+21.35	

=== Currumbin ===
2012 Queensland state election: Currumbin
Party	Candidate	Votes	%	±%
Liberal National	Jann Stuckey	16,237	58.84	+7.77
Labor	Calum Hyslop	6,051	21.93	−14.65
Greens	David Wyatt	2,624	9.51	+0.31
Katter's Australian	Steve Bowman	1,973	7.15	+7.15
Family First	Royston Pickering	710	2.57	+2.57
Total formal votes		27,595	97.61	−0.56
Informal votes		675	2.39	+0.56
Turnout		28,270	88.92	−0.03
Two-party-preferred result
Liberal National	Jann Stuckey	17,245	70.19	+13.30
Labor	Calum Hyslop	7,325	29.81	−13.30
Liberal National hold		Swing	+13.30	

=== Dalrymple ===
2012 Queensland state election: Dalrymple
Party	Candidate	Votes	%	±%
Katter's Australian	Shane Knuth	13,982	53.73	+53.73
Liberal National	Liz Schmidt	7,576	29.11	−12.31
Labor	Benjamin Gertz	2,886	11.09	−11.06
Greens	Jess Jones	1,230	4.73	+1.57
Socialist Alliance	Jason Briskey	177	0.68	+0.68
Independent	Christopher Williamson	172	0.66	+0.66
Total formal votes		26,023	98.53	−0.26
Informal votes		388	1.47	+0.26
Turnout		26,411	90.47	−0.89
Two-party-preferred result
Katter's Australian	Shane Knuth	15,126	65.22	+65.22
Liberal National	Liz Schmidt	8,067	34.78	−20.40
Katter's Australian gain from Liberal National		Swing	N/A	

=== Everton ===
2012 Queensland state election: Everton
Party	Candidate	Votes	%	±%
Liberal National	Tim Mander	16,364	57.50	+13.38
Labor	Murray Watt	8,851	31.10	−13.29
Greens	Bruce Hallett	2,053	7.21	−1.86
Katter's Australian	Denym Witherow	1,192	4.19	+4.19
Total formal votes		28,460	98.47	+0.10
Informal votes		442	1.53	−0.10
Turnout		28,902	93.64	+0.38
Two-party-preferred result
Liberal National	Tim Mander	17,125	63.15	+14.54
Labor	Murray Watt	9,991	36.85	−14.54
Liberal National gain from Labor		Swing	+14.54	

=== Ferny Grove ===
2012 Queensland state election: Ferny Grove
Party	Candidate	Votes	%	±%
Liberal National	Dale Shuttleworth	15,458	54.36	+15.07
Labor	Geoff Wilson	8,929	31.40	−12.86
Greens	Howard Nielsen	4,051	14.25	+0.30
Total formal votes		28,438	98.27	−0.31
Informal votes		501	1.73	+0.31
Turnout		28,939	94.05	+0.94
Two-party-preferred result
Liberal National	Dale Shuttleworth	16,062	59.52	+14.01
Labor	Geoff Wilson	10,922	40.48	−14.01
Liberal National gain from Labor		Swing	+14.01	

=== Gaven ===
2012 Queensland state election: Gaven
Party	Candidate	Votes	%	±%
Liberal National	Alex Douglas	15,175	55.16	+13.23
Labor	Michael Riordan	6,289	22.86	−16.94
Katter's Australian	Brian Zimmerman	2,413	8.77	+8.77
Greens	Stephen Power	1,536	5.58	−1.43
Family First	Bibe Roadley	1,298	4.72	+2.10
Independent	Penny Toland	799	2.90	+2.90
Total formal votes		27,510	97.00	−0.25
Informal votes		850	3.00	+0.25
Turnout		28,360	89.54	−0.65
Two-party-preferred result
Liberal National	Alex Douglas	16,471	69.10	+18.38
Labor	Michael Riordan	7,365	30.90	−18.38
Liberal National hold		Swing	+18.38	

=== Gladstone ===
2012 Queensland state election: Gladstone
Party	Candidate	Votes	%	±%
Independent	Liz Cunningham	14,020	48.96	−5.68
Labor	Glenn Butcher	8,359	29.19	−13.45
Liberal National	Russell Schroter	3,109	10.86	+10.86
Katter's Australian	Anthony Beezley	2,545	8.89	+8.89
Greens	Andrew Blake	602	2.10	−0.62
Total formal votes		28,635	98.36	−0.31
Informal votes		477	1.64	+0.31
Turnout		29,112	90.92	−1.19
Two-party-preferred result
Independent	Liz Cunningham	15,890	64.03	+7.90
Labor	Glenn Butcher	8,925	35.97	−7.90
Independent hold		Swing	+7.90	

=== Glass House ===
2012 Queensland state election: Glass House
Party	Candidate	Votes	%	±%
Liberal National	Andrew Powell	15,910	55.85	+7.23
Labor	Ryan Moore	5,032	17.67	−16.10
Greens	Stewart Luke	4,455	15.64	−1.97
Katter's Australian	Peter Harris	3,088	10.84	+10.84
Total formal votes		28,485	97.64	−0.36
Informal votes		689	2.36	+0.36
Turnout		29,174	92.62	+0.43
Two-party-preferred result
Liberal National	Andrew Powell	17,573	70.39	+14.58
Labor	Ryan Moore	7,391	29.61	−14.58
Liberal National hold		Swing	+14.58	

=== Greenslopes ===
2012 Queensland state election: Greenslopes
Party	Candidate	Votes	%	±%
Liberal National	Ian Kaye	13,076	47.87	+10.06
Labor	Cameron Dick	10,713	39.22	−7.06
Greens	Emma-Kate Rose	3,529	12.92	+0.35
Total formal votes		27,318	98.39	+0.01
Informal votes		448	1.61	−0.01
Turnout		27,766	92.01	+0.56
Two-party-preferred result
Liberal National	Ian Kaye	13,590	52.45	+9.39
Labor	Cameron Dick	12,318	47.55	−9.39
Liberal National gain from Labor		Swing	+9.39	

=== Gregory ===
2012 Queensland state election: Gregory
Party	Candidate	Votes	%	±%
Liberal National	Vaughan Johnson	13,399	59.10	−2.71
Labor	Jack O'Brien	3,970	17.51	−16.00
Katter's Australian	Pauline Williams	3,855	17.00	+17.00
Independent	Bruce Currie	831	3.67	+3.67
Greens	Norman Weston	617	2.72	−1.96
Total formal votes		22,672	98.42	−0.25
Informal votes		364	1.58	+0.25
Turnout		23,036	89.86	−1.90
Two-party-preferred result
Liberal National	Vaughan Johnson	14,895	75.48	+11.22
Labor	Jack O'Brien	4,840	24.52	−11.22
Liberal National hold		Swing	+11.22	

=== Gympie ===
2012 Queensland state election: Gympie
Party	Candidate	Votes	%	±%
Liberal National	David Gibson	15,054	53.03	−7.60
Katter's Australian	Shane Paulger	6,198	21.83	+21.83
Labor	Ben Parker	3,475	12.24	−2.41
Greens	Shena MacDonald	2,410	8.49	−1.90
Family First	Kathy Hawke	917	3.23	+3.23
One Nation	Santo Ferraro	335	1.18	+1.18
Total formal votes		28,389	97.84	−0.02
Informal votes		627	2.16	+0.02
Turnout		29,016	92.53	+0.47
Two-party-preferred result
Liberal National	David Gibson	16,194	67.26	−9.95
Katter's Australian	Shane Paulger	7,883	32.74	+32.74
Liberal National hold		Swing	−9.95	

=== Hervey Bay ===
2012 Queensland state election: Hervey Bay
Party	Candidate	Votes	%	±%
Liberal National	Ted Sorensen	17,668	59.23	+8.87
Labor	Bernice Allen	6,325	21.20	−17.45
Katter's Australian	Isobel Dale	3,684	12.35	+12.35
Family First	Troy Sullivan	1,124	3.77	+3.77
Greens	Glenn Martin	1,029	3.45	−1.02
Total formal votes		29,830	97.84	−0.36
Informal votes		660	2.16	+0.36
Turnout		30,490	91.05	−0.27
Two-party-preferred result
Liberal National	Ted Sorensen	19,160	71.72	+15.22
Labor	Bernice Allen	7,556	28.28	−15.22
Liberal National hold		Swing	+15.22	

=== Hinchinbrook ===
2012 Queensland state election: Hinchinbrook
Party	Candidate	Votes	%	±%
Liberal National	Andrew Cripps	11,952	44.04	−13.92
Katter's Australian	Jeff Knuth	9,564	35.24	+35.24
Labor	Tony McGuire	4,491	16.55	−13.06
Greens	Pamela Monaghan	867	3.19	−2.42
North Queensland	Desmond Connors	263	0.97	+0.97
Total formal votes		27,137	98.51	+0.73
Informal votes		410	1.49	−0.73
Turnout		27,547	92.17	+0.63
Two-party-preferred result
Liberal National	Andrew Cripps	12,652	53.63	−11.06
Katter's Australian	Jeff Knuth	10,940	46.37	+46.37
Liberal National hold		Swing	−11.06	

=== Inala ===
2012 Queensland state election: Inala
Party	Candidate	Votes	%	±%
Labor	Annastacia Palaszczuk	12,016	46.22	−17.73
Liberal National	Joanna Lindgren	9,115	35.06	+11.34
Katter's Australian	Ashley Dodd	2,993	11.51	+11.51
Greens	Michael Quall	1,874	7.21	−0.82
Total formal votes		25,998	97.01	−0.63
Informal votes		802	2.99	+0.63
Turnout		26,800	90.96	−0.60
Two-party-preferred result
Labor	Annastacia Palaszczuk	13,410	56.90	−14.63
Liberal National	Joanna Lindgren	10,159	43.10	+14.63
Labor hold		Swing	−14.63	

=== Indooroopilly ===
2012 Queensland state election: Indooroopilly
Party	Candidate	Votes	%	±%
Liberal National	Scott Emerson	15,225	60.89	+14.44
Labor	Oscar Schlamowitz	4,669	18.67	−7.87
Greens	Charles Worringham	4,623	18.49	−7.44
Family First	Andrew Mooney	488	1.95	+1.95
Total formal votes		25,005	98.62	−0.34
Informal votes		351	1.38	+0.34
Turnout		25,356	89.89	−0.72
Two-party-preferred result
Liberal National	Scott Emerson	16,140	69.55	+13.68
Labor	Oscar Schlamowitz	7,067	30.45	−13.68
Liberal National hold		Swing	+13.68	

=== Ipswich ===
2012 Queensland state election: Ipswich
Party	Candidate	Votes	%	±%
Liberal National	Ian Berry	10,023	35.87	+6.81
Labor	Rachel Nolan	8,703	31.14	−29.02
Katter's Australian	Will Keys	4,041	14.46	+14.46
Independent	Patricia Petersen	2,470	8.84	+8.84
Greens	Veronica White	1,568	5.61	−1.09
Family First	Tim Stieler	880	3.15	−0.93
Independent	Robert Jeremy	259	0.93	+0.93
Total formal votes		27,944	97.33	−0.73
Informal votes		767	2.67	+0.73
Turnout		28,711	92.01	−0.50
Two-party-preferred result
Liberal National	Ian Berry	12,243	54.19	+20.90
Labor	Rachel Nolan	10,351	45.81	−20.90
Liberal National gain from Labor		Swing	+20.90	

=== Ipswich West ===
2012 Queensland state election: Ipswich West
Party	Candidate	Votes	%	±%
Liberal National	Sean Choat	12,424	43.54	+6.18
Labor	Wayne Wendt	9,083	31.83	−22.16
Katter's Australian	Justin Bowman	5,225	18.31	+18.31
Greens	Ursula Monsiegneur	1,804	6.32	−2.33
Total formal votes		28,536	97.75	−0.37
Informal votes		657	2.25	+0.37
Turnout		29,193	93.24	+0.23
Two-party-preferred result
Liberal National	Sean Choat	14,146	57.16	+16.71
Labor	Wayne Wendt	10,600	42.84	−16.71
Liberal National gain from Labor		Swing	+16.71	

=== Kallangur ===
2012 Queensland state election: Kallangur
Party	Candidate	Votes	%	±%
Liberal National	Trevor Ruthenberg	13,983	52.05	+12.63
Labor	Mary-Anne O'Neill	7,750	28.85	−18.16
Katter's Australian	Michael Bates	3,005	11.19	+11.19
Greens	Rachel Doherty	2,125	7.91	−0.77
Total formal votes		26,863	97.53	−0.14
Informal votes		681	2.47	+0.14
Turnout		27,544	92.24	−0.01
Two-party-preferred result
Liberal National	Trevor Ruthenberg	15,187	62.43	+17.06
Labor	Mary-Anne O'Neill	9,138	37.57	−17.06
Liberal National gain from Labor		Swing	+17.06	

=== Kawana ===
2012 Queensland state election: Kawana
Party	Candidate	Votes	%	±%
Liberal National	Jarrod Bleijie	19,132	66.84	+14.57
Labor	Bruce Garner	5,114	17.87	−19.87
Greens	Gabrielle Roberts	2,384	8.33	−1.66
Katter's Australian	Paul Spencer	1,994	6.97	+6.97
Total formal votes		28,624	97.82	−0.05
Informal votes		637	2.18	+0.05
Turnout		29,261	90.62	−0.83
Two-party-preferred result
Liberal National	Jarrod Bleijie	20,111	76.26	+19.33
Labor	Bruce Garner	6,261	23.74	−19.33
Liberal National hold		Swing	+19.33	

=== Keppel ===
2012 Queensland state election: Keppel
Party	Candidate	Votes	%	±%
Liberal National	Bruce Young	13,143	44.25	+4.86
Labor	Paul Hoolihan	9,935	33.45	−19.13
Katter's Australian	Luke Hargreaves	4,722	15.90	+15.90
Greens	Paul Bambrick	1,905	6.41	−1.62
Total formal votes		29.705	97.95	−0.20
Informal votes		622	2.05	+0.20
Turnout		30,327	92.69	+0.26
Two-party-preferred result
Liberal National	Bruce Young	14,757	56.39	+14.01
Labor	Paul Hoolihan	11,411	43.61	−14.01
Liberal National gain from Labor		Swing	+14.01	

=== Lockyer ===
2012 Queensland state election: Lockyer
Party	Candidate	Votes	%	±%
Liberal National	Ian Rickuss	14,348	52.01	−1.55
Katter's Australian	David Neuendorf	6,571	23.82	+23.82
Labor	James Wilson	4,876	17.68	−19.94
Greens	Clare Rudkin	1,790	6.49	−2.33
Total formal votes		27,585	97.66	−0.07
Informal votes		661	2.34	+0.07
Turnout		28,246	93.66	−0.77
Two-party-preferred result
Liberal National	Ian Rickuss	15,387	64.87	+7.26
Katter's Australian	David Neuendorf	8,334	35.13	+35.13
Liberal National hold		Swing	+7.26	

=== Logan ===
2012 Queensland state election: Logan
Party	Candidate	Votes	%	±%
Liberal National	Michael Pucci	10,388	41.01	+9.34
Labor	Linus Power	8,431	33.29	−23.44
Katter's Australian	Tony Karamatic	3,196	12.62	+12.62
Independent	Mike Kelly	1,559	6.16	+6.16
Greens	Julian Hinton	1,362	5.38	−3.12
One Nation	Troy Aggett	392	1.55	+1.55
Total formal votes		25,328	96.63	−0.31
Informal votes		882	3.37	+0.31
Turnout		26,210	91.28	−0.14
Two-party-preferred result
Liberal National	Michael Pucci	11,801	54.80	+18.73
Labor	Linus Power	9,732	45.20	−18.73
Liberal National gain from Labor		Swing	+18.73	

=== Lytton ===
2012 Queensland state election: Lytton
Party	Candidate	Votes	%	±%
Liberal National	Neil Symes	12,181	43.66	+11.43
Labor	Daniel Cheverton	10,961	39.29	−13.20
Greens	Daniel Crute	2,256	8.09	+0.96
Katter's Australian	Jim Vote	1,881	6.74	+6.74
Middle Australian	Russell McVey	618	2.22	+2.22
Total formal votes		27,897	97.49	−0.65
Informal votes		719	2.51	+0.65
Turnout		28,616	92.19	−0.49
Two-party-preferred result
Liberal National	Neil Symes	13,101	51.58	+13.79
Labor	Daniel Cheverton	12,299	48.42	−13.79
Liberal National gain from Labor		Swing	+13.79	

=== Mackay ===
2012 Queensland state election: Mackay
Party	Candidate	Votes	%	±%
Labor	Tim Mulherin	9,920	38.58	−22.78
Liberal National	John Kerslake	9,499	36.94	+6.76
Katter's Australian	Lindsay Temple	4,870	18.94	+18.94
Greens	Luke Mathews	1,425	5.54	−2.92
Total formal votes		25,714	97.80	+0.07
Informal votes		578	2.20	−0.07
Turnout		26,292	89.75	−1.07
Two-party-preferred result
Labor	Tim Mulherin	11,317	50.53	−16.19
Liberal National	John Kerslake	11,081	49.47	+16.19
Labor hold		Swing	−16.19	

=== Mansfield ===
2012 Queensland state election: Mansfield
Party	Candidate	Votes	%	±%
Liberal National	Ian Walker	13,953	53.67	+14.05
Labor	Phil Reeves	8,416	32.37	−14.91
Greens	Craig Sheehan	1,592	6.12	−0.65
Katter's Australian	Ray Smith	1,135	4.37	+4.37
Family First	Carolyn Ferrando	696	2.68	−0.78
Independent	Jarrod J Wirth	206	0.79	+0.79
Total formal votes		25,998	98.28	−0.03
Informal votes		454	1.72	+0.03
Turnout		26,452	91.94	−0.47
Two-party-preferred result
Liberal National	Ian Walker	14,886	61.14	+15.53
Labor	Phil Reeves	9,462	38.86	−15.53
Liberal National gain from Labor		Swing	+15.53	

=== Maroochydore ===
2012 Queensland state election: Maroochydore
Party	Candidate	Votes	%	±%
Liberal National	Fiona Simpson	16,339	58.16	+1.88
Labor	Ray Barber	5,660	20.15	−10.83
Greens	Rainee Skinner	3,652	13.00	+0.26
Katter's Australian	Mark Maguire	2,440	8.69	+8.69
Total formal votes		28,091	97.83	−0.31
Informal votes		622	2.17	+0.31
Turnout		28,713	88.22	+0.41
Two-party-preferred result
Liberal National	Fiona Simpson	17,738	70.93	+8.13
Labor	Ray Barber	7,269	29.07	−8.13
Liberal National hold		Swing	+8.13	

=== Maryborough ===
2012 Queensland state election: Maryborough
Party	Candidate	Votes	%	±%
Liberal National	Anne Maddern	10,745	35.74	+9.97
Independent	Chris Foley	9,071	30.17	−17.50
Katter's Australian	Gordon Dale	5,879	19.56	+19.56
Labor	Ezra Burtt	3,538	11.77	−11.00
Greens	Garry Claridge	830	2.76	−1.02
Total formal votes		30,063	97.96	−0.09
Informal votes		626	2.04	+0.09
Turnout		30,689	92.53	−0.48
Two-party-preferred result
Liberal National	Anne Maddern	12,228	50.31	+17.14
Independent	Chris Foley	12,076	49.69	−17.14
Liberal National gain from Independent		Swing	+17.14	

=== Mermaid Beach ===
2012 Queensland state election: Mermaid Beach
Party	Candidate	Votes	%	±%
Liberal National	Ray Stevens	17,856	65.13	+10.69
Labor	Rachel Paterson	5,064	18.47	−15.02
Greens	Jenny Boddy	2,043	7.45	+0.76
Katter's Australian	Ken Law	1,664	6.07	+6.07
Family First	Ben Donovan	788	2.87	+2.87
Total formal votes		27,415	97.67	−0.17
Informal votes		653	2.33	+0.17
Turnout		28,068	87.97	−0.09
Two-party-preferred result
Liberal National	Ray Stevens	18,764	76.05	+15.24
Labor	Rachel Paterson	5,910	23.95	−15.24
Liberal National hold		Swing	+15.24	

=== Mirani ===
2012 Queensland state election: Mirani
Party	Candidate	Votes	%	±%
Liberal National	Ted Malone	13,599	46.65	−1.30
Labor	Jim Pearce	8,369	28.71	−17.82
Katter's Australian	Bevan Pidgeon	5,585	19.16	+19.16
Greens	Christine Carlisle	975	3.34	−2.17
Family First	Mike Crouther	626	2.15	+2.15
Total formal votes		29,154	98.25	−0.06
Informal votes		520	1.75	+0.06
Turnout		29,674	92.37	−0.42
Two-party-preferred result
Liberal National	Ted Malone	15,345	61.19	+10.60
Labor	Jim Pearce	9,733	38.81	−10.60
Liberal National hold		Swing	+10.60	

=== Moggill ===
2012 Queensland state election: Moggill
Party	Candidate	Votes	%	±%
Liberal National	Bruce Flegg	18,348	63.27	+14.09
Labor	Michael Nelson	4,540	15.65	−8.96
Greens	Jake Schoermer	4,001	13.80	−0.15
Katter's Australian	Barry Searle	2,112	7.28	+7.28
Total formal votes		29,001	98.52	−0.33
Informal votes		435	1.48	+0.33
Turnout		29,436	92.84	+0.16
Two-party-preferred result
Liberal National	Bruce Flegg	19,703	73.91	+12.63
Labor	Michael Nelson	6,956	26.09	−12.63
Liberal National hold		Swing	+12.63	

=== Morayfield ===
2012 Queensland state election: Morayfield
Party	Candidate	Votes	%	±%
Liberal National	Darren Grimwade	12,779	47.02	+13.95
Labor	Mark Ryan	9,988	36.75	−11.69
Katter's Australian	Stephen Beck	2,880	10.60	+10.60
Greens	Paul Doherty	1,532	5.64	−1.68
Total formal votes		27,179	97.37	−0.07
Informal votes		734	2.63	+0.07
Turnout		27,913	92.17	+0.01
Two-party-preferred result
Liberal National	Darren Grimwade	13,818	55.57	+14.70
Labor	Mark Ryan	11,046	44.43	−14.70
Liberal National gain from Labor		Swing	+14.70	

=== Mount Coot-tha ===
2012 Queensland state election: Mount Coot-tha
Party	Candidate	Votes	%	±%
Liberal National	Saxon Rice	12,142	47.74	+11.48
Labor	Andrew Fraser	7,285	28.64	−9.24
Greens	Adam Stone	5,269	20.72	−2.36
Katter's Australian	Margaret Waterman	739	2.91	+2.91
Total formal votes		25,435	98.77	−0.01
Informal votes		317	1.23	+0.01
Turnout		25,752	89.53	+1.76
Two-party-preferred result
Liberal National	Saxon Rice	13,067	55.36	+10.61
Labor	Andrew Fraser	10,538	44.64	−10.61
Liberal National gain from Labor		Swing	+10.61	

=== Mount Isa ===
2012 Queensland state election: Mount Isa
Party	Candidate	Votes	%	±%
Katter's Australian	Rob Katter	6,658	41.61	+41.61
Liberal National	Mick Pattel	4,731	29.57	+0.08
Labor	Betty Kiernan	4,264	26.65	−17.80
Greens	Colleen Williams	348	2.17	−0.34
Total formal votes		16,001	98.36	+0.03
Informal votes		267	1.64	−0.03
Turnout		16,268	85.42	−0.34
Two-party-preferred result
Katter's Australian	Rob Katter	7,996	60.04	+60.04
Liberal National	Mick Pattel	5,322	39.96	−4.32
Katter's Australian gain from Labor		Swing	+60.04	

=== Mount Ommaney ===
2012 Queensland state election: Mount Ommaney
Party	Candidate	Votes	%	±%
Liberal National	Tarnya Smith	15,781	57.30	+16.98
Labor	Ben Marczyk	7,086	25.73	−21.51
Greens	Jenny Mulkearns	2,694	9.78	−0.20
Katter's Australian	Douglas Newson	1,169	4.24	+4.24
Family First	Jordan Brown	452	1.64	+1.64
Independent	Rex Schmith	360	1.31	+1.31
Total formal votes		27,542	97.97	−0.55
Informal votes		570	2.03	+0.55
Turnout		28,112	92.88	+0.78
Two-party-preferred result
Liberal National	Tarnya Smith	16,773	66.48	+21.27
Labor	Ben Marczyk	8,457	33.52	−21.27
Liberal National gain from Labor		Swing	+21.27	

=== Mudgeeraba ===
2012 Queensland state election: Mudgeeraba
Party	Candidate	Votes	%	±%
Liberal National	Ros Bates	16,534	61.69	+15.47
Labor	Aaron Santelises	4,753	17.73	−21.10
Katter's Australian	Kevin Swan	2,056	7.67	+7.67
Greens	Sally Spain	2,056	7.67	+0.63
Family First	Barrie Nicholson	1,402	5.23	+1.41
Total formal votes		26,801	97.72	−0.04
Informal votes		626	2.28	+0.04
Turnout		27,427	89.61	−0.77
Two-party-preferred result
Liberal National	Ros Bates	17,707	75.93	+22.01
Labor	Aaron Santelises	5,612	24.07	−22.01
Liberal National hold		Swing	+22.01	

=== Mulgrave ===
2012 Queensland state election: Mulgrave
Party	Candidate	Votes	%	±%
Labor	Curtis Pitt	8,739	34.50	−13.51
Liberal National	Robyn Quick	8,105	32.00	−1.44
Katter's Australian	Damian Byrnes	7,585	29.95	+29.95
Greens	Jim Cavill	899	3.55	−2.06
Total formal votes		25,328	98.13	+0.50
Informal votes		482	1.87	−0.50
Turnout		25,810	90.36	+0.06
Two-party-preferred result
Labor	Curtis Pitt	10,514	51.15	−6.93
Liberal National	Robyn Quick	10,043	48.85	−6.93
Labor hold		Swing	−6.93	

=== Mundingburra ===
2012 Queensland state election: Mundingburra
Party	Candidate	Votes	%	±%
Liberal National	David Crisafulli	11,069	43.34	+5.54
Labor	Mark Harrison	6,569	25.72	−22.68
Katter's Australian	David Moyle	5,875	23.00	+23.00
Greens	Bret Fishley	1,283	5.02	−3.64
Family First	Michael Waters	745	2.92	−0.63
Total formal votes		25,541	97.65	+0.09
Informal votes		614	2.35	−0.09
Turnout		26,155	89.89	+0.84
Two-party-preferred result
Liberal National	David Crisafulli	12,924	60.19	+16.78
Labor	Mark Harrison	8,547	39.81	−16.78
Liberal National gain from Labor		Swing	+16.78	

=== Murrumba ===
2012 Queensland state election: Murrumba
Party	Candidate	Votes	%	±%
Liberal National	Reg Gulley	14,040	49.11	+12.04
Labor	Dean Wells	9,267	32.42	−18.38
Katter's Australian	Paul Edwards	2,263	7.92	+7.92
Family First	Sally Vincent	1,622	5.67	+1.07
Greens	Rodney Blair	1,394	4.88	−2.65
Total formal votes		28,586	97.71	−0.02
Informal votes		671	2.29	+0.02
Turnout		29,257	91.89	+0.34
Two-party-preferred result
Liberal National	Reg Gulley	15,465	59.52	+16.73
Labor	Dean Wells	10,516	40.48	−16.73
Liberal National gain from Labor		Swing	+16.73	

=== Nanango ===
2012 Queensland state election: Nanango
Party	Candidate	Votes	%	±%
Liberal National	Deb Frecklington	13,493	45.44	+4.81
Katter's Australian	Carl Rackemann	7,818	26.33	+26.33
Independent	John Dalton	3,804	12.81	+12.81
Labor	Virginia Clarke	3,134	10.55	−4.80
Greens	Grant Newson	1,090	3.67	−0.25
Queensland Party	David Thomson	357	1.20	+1.20
Total formal votes		29,696	98.10	−0.48
Informal votes		575	1.90	+0.48
Turnout		30,271	92.48	−0.11
Two-party-preferred result
Liberal National	Deb Frecklington	14,705	58.98	+11.88
Katter's Australian	Carl Rackemann	10,229	41.02	+41.02
Liberal National gain from Independent		Swing	+11.88	

=== Nicklin ===
2012 Queensland state election: Nicklin
Party	Candidate	Votes	%	±%
Independent	Peter Wellington	10,725	39.14	−10.77
Liberal National	John Connolly	9,829	35.87	+7.59
Labor	Luke Moore	2,154	7.86	−7.89
Katter's Australian	Matthew Smith	2,075	7.57	+7.57
Greens	John Law	1,937	7.07	+0.51
Family First	Cathy Turner	684	2.50	+2.50
Total formal votes		27,404	98.28	−0.22
Informal votes		481	1.72	+0.22
Turnout		27,885	90.85	−0.07
Two-party-preferred result
Independent	Peter Wellington	13,186	54.88	−11.43
Liberal National	John Connolly	10,841	45.12	+11.43
Independent hold		Swing	−11.43	

=== Noosa ===
2012 Queensland state election: Noosa
Party	Candidate	Votes	%	±%
Liberal National	Glen Elmes	17,121	60.59	+4.45
Greens	Jim McDonald	4,382	15.51	+2.25
Labor	Kurt Hopkins	3,514	12.44	−8.13
Katter's Australian	Bob Jarvis	2,548	9.02	+9.02
Family First	Gemika Maloney	376	1.33	−0.57
Independent	Bill Colley	316	1.12	+1.12
Total formal votes		28,257	97.99	−0.43
Informal votes		580	2.01	+0.43
Turnout		28,837	89.50	−0.26
Two-party-preferred result
Liberal National	Glen Elmes	18,116	75.46	+5.61
Greens	Jim McDonald	5,893	24.54	+24.54
Liberal National hold		Swing	+5.61	

=== Nudgee ===
2012 Queensland state election: Nudgee
Party	Candidate	Votes	%	±%
Liberal National	Jason Woodforth	12,862	44.49	+13.55
Labor	Leanne Linard	10,837	37.49	−18.48
Greens	Anthony Pink	2,337	8.08	−0.71
Katter's Australian	Terri Bell	1,953	6.76	+6.76
Family First	Claude Gonsalves	571	1.98	−0.46
Independent	Douglas Crowhurst	349	1.21	−0.65
Total formal votes		28,909	97.81	−0.42
Informal votes		647	2.19	+0.42
Turnout		29,556	92.10	+0.45
Two-party-preferred result
Liberal National	Jason Woodforth	13,932	53.11	+17.37
Labor	Leanne Linard	12,300	46.89	−17.37
Liberal National gain from Labor		Swing	+17.37	

=== Pine Rivers ===
2012 Queensland state election: Pine Rivers
Party	Candidate	Votes	%	±%
Liberal National	Seath Holswich	14,590	52.93	+13.41
Labor	Patrick Bulman	7,556	27.41	−19.95
Katter's Australian	John Alexander	3,091	11.21	+11.21
Greens	Di Clark	2,326	8.44	−0.21
Total formal votes		27,563	97.38	−0.48
Informal votes		741	2.62	+0.48
Turnout		28,304	93.18	+0.29
Two-party-preferred result
Liberal National	Seath Holswich	15,856	63.66	+18.27
Labor	Patrick Bulman	9,052	36.34	−18.27
Liberal National gain from Labor		Swing	+18.27	

=== Pumicestone ===
2012 Queensland state election: Pumicestone
Party	Candidate	Votes	%	±%
Liberal National	Lisa France	16,340	53.15	+13.05
Labor	Carryn Sullivan	9,355	30.43	−17.49
Katter's Australian	Brandt King	3,186	10.36	+10.36
Greens	Jenny Fitzgibbon	1,860	6.05	−2.21
Total formal votes		30,741	97.70	−0.12
Informal votes		725	2.30	+0.12
Turnout		31,466	91.59	−0.08
Two-party-preferred result
Liberal National	Lisa France	17,521	62.07	+17.06
Labor	Carryn Sullivan	10,705	37.93	−17.06
Liberal National gain from Labor		Swing	+17.06	

=== Redcliffe ===
2012 Queensland state election: Redcliffe
Party	Candidate	Votes	%	±%
Liberal National	Scott Driscoll	13,991	49.24	+14.94
Labor	Lillian van Litsenburg	8,739	30.76	−12.26
Katter's Australian	Bevan Collingwood	2,484	8.74	+8.74
Greens	Noel Clothier	1,912	6.73	+0.61
Family First	Kerri Dooley	1,288	4.53	+1.91
Total formal votes		28,414	97.61	−0.42
Informal votes		695	2.39	+0.42
Turnout		29,109	91.11	+0.21
Two-party-preferred result
Liberal National	Scott Driscoll	15,427	60.10	+15.67
Labor	Lillian van Litsenburg	10,242	39.90	−15.67
Liberal National gain from Labor		Swing	+15.67	

=== Redlands ===
2012 Queensland state election: Redlands
Party	Candidate	Votes	%	±%
Liberal National	Peter Dowling	17,849	65.80	+21.08
Labor	Peter Seage	6,524	24.05	−18.97
Greens	David Keogh	2,753	10.15	+4.91
Total formal votes		27,126	97.57	−0.41
Informal votes		675	2.43	+0.41
Turnout		27,801	92.16	+0.08
Two-party-preferred result
Liberal National	Peter Dowling	18,381	71.10	+21.03
Labor	Peter Seage	7,471	28.90	−21.03
Liberal National hold		Swing	+21.03	

=== Rockhampton ===
2012 Queensland state election: Rockhampton
Party	Candidate	Votes	%	±%
Labor	Bill Byrne	11,002	39.79	−21.78
Liberal National	Gavin Finch	8,781	31.76	+4.54
Katter's Australian	Shane Guley	3,507	12.68	+12.68
Independent	Bruce Diamond	1,847	6.68	+6.68
Greens	Bronwen Lloyd	954	3.45	−0.62
Family First	Genevieve Ellis	734	2.65	+2.65
Independent	Diane Hamilton	541	1.96	+1.96
Independent	Chris Hooper	286	1.03	+1.03
Total formal votes		27,652	97.02	−1.06
Informal votes		850	2.98	+1.06
Turnout		28,502	91.73	−0.11
Two-party-preferred result
Labor	Bill Byrne	12,191	53.95	−13.97
Liberal National	Gavin Finch	10,406	46.05	+13.97
Labor hold		Swing	−13.97	

=== Sandgate ===
2012 Queensland state election: Sandgate
Party	Candidate	Votes	%	±%
Liberal National	Kerry Millard	12,096	43.75	+11.41
Labor	Vicky Darling	10,408	37.64	−16.41
Greens	Claire Ogden	2,483	8.98	+0.78
Katter's Australian	John Dunkley	1,458	5.27	+5.27
Family First	Penny McCreery	751	2.72	+0.53
Socialist Alliance	Mike Crook	454	1.64	+0.31
Total formal votes		27,650	97.76	−0.38
Informal votes		633	2.24	+0.38
Turnout		28,283	93.06	+0.18
Two-party-preferred result
Liberal National	Kerry Millard	13,228	52.87	+15.24
Labor	Vicky Darling	11,794	47.13	−15.24
Liberal National gain from Labor		Swing	+15.24	

=== South Brisbane ===
2012 Queensland state election: South Brisbane
Party	Candidate	Votes	%	±%
Labor	Anna Bligh	10,015	38.57	−9.85
Liberal National	Clem Grehan	9,887	38.07	+10.16
Greens	Jo-Anne Bragg	4,692	18.07	+0.66
Katter's Australian	Robert Wardrop	883	3.40	+3.40
Socialist Alliance	Liam Flenady	491	1.89	+1.89
Total formal votes		25,968	97.94	−0.25
Informal votes		547	2.06	+0.25
Turnout		26,515	87.11	+0.67
Two-party-preferred result
Labor	Anna Bligh	12,977	54.66	−10.35
Liberal National	Clem Grehan	10,763	45.34	+10.35
Labor hold		Swing	−10.35	

=== Southern Downs ===
2012 Queensland state election: Southern Downs
Party	Candidate	Votes	%	±%
Liberal National	Lawrence Springborg	19,771	66.62	−1.65
Katter's Australian	Ade Larsen	4,112	13.86	+13.86
Labor	Suzanne Kidman	3,979	13.41	−12.45
Greens	Michael Kane	1,163	3.92	−1.95
Family First	John Spellman	652	2.20	+2.20
Total formal votes		29,677	98.27	−0.33
Informal votes		522	1.73	+0.33
Turnout		30,199	92.33	−0.75
Two-party-preferred result
Liberal National	Lawrence Springborg	20,713	79.77	+8.69
Katter's Australian	Ade Larsen	5,253	20.23	+20.23
Liberal National hold		Swing	+8.69	

=== Southport ===
2012 Queensland state election: Southport
Party	Candidate	Votes	%	±%
Liberal National	Rob Molhoek	14,890	55.84	+15.44
Labor	Peter Lawlor	7,580	28.43	−16.90
Katter's Australian	Kevin Brown	1,987	7.45	+7.45
Greens	Stephen Dalton	1,784	6.69	−0.64
Independent	Matthew Mackechnie	425	1.59	+1.59
Total formal votes		26,666	97.08	−0.38
Informal votes		803	2.92	+0.38
Turnout		27,469	87.59	−0.30
Two-party-preferred result
Liberal National	Rob Molhoek	15,645	64.72	+18.20
Labor	Peter Lawlor	8,529	35.28	−18.20
Liberal National gain from Labor		Swing	+18.20	

=== Springwood ===
2012 Queensland state election: Springwood
Party	Candidate	Votes	%	±%
Liberal National	John Grant	15,939	55.67	+15.46
Labor	Barbara Stone	8,016	28.00	−18.95
Katter's Australian	Julian Tocaciu	1,923	6.72	+6.72
Greens	Neil Cotter	1,910	6.67	−0.57
Family First	Chris Lawrie	845	2.95	+2.95
Total formal votes		28,633	97.86	−0.08
Informal votes		625	2.14	+0.08
Turnout		29,258	91.35	−0.50
Two-party-preferred result
Liberal National	John Grant	17,256	65.39	+19.47
Labor	Barbara Stone	9,132	34.61	−19.47
Liberal National gain from Labor		Swing	+19.47	

=== Stafford ===
2012 Queensland state election: Stafford
Party	Candidate	Votes	%	±%
Liberal National	Chris Davis	13,423	50.23	+12.35
Labor	Stirling Hinchliffe	8,972	33.58	−14.87
Greens	Peter Jeremijenko	3,020	11.30	−0.49
Katter's Australian	Karin Hunter	1,307	4.89	+4.89
Total formal votes		26,722	98.10	−0.11
Informal votes		517	1.90	+0.11
Turnout		27,239	91.36	+0.02
Two-party-preferred result
Liberal National	Chris Davis	14,302	57.06	+14.35
Labor	Stirling Hinchliffe	10,763	42.94	−14.35
Liberal National gain from Labor		Swing	+14.35	

=== Stretton ===
2012 Queensland state election: Stretton
Party	Candidate	Votes	%	±%
Liberal National	Freya Ostapovitch	13,000	46.85	+9.75
Labor	Duncan Pegg	7,968	28.72	−24.86
Independent	David Forde	5,259	18.95	+18.95
Greens	Brian Sadler	1,521	5.48	−3.84
Total formal votes		27,748	97.57	−0.57
Informal votes		690	2.43	+2.43
Turnout		28,438	90.16	−0.62
Two-party-preferred result
Liberal National	Freya Ostapovitch	14,239	59.55	+19.03
Labor	Duncan Pegg	9,670	40.45	−19.03
Liberal National gain from Labor		Swing	+19.03	

=== Sunnybank ===
2012 Queensland state election: Sunnybank
Party	Candidate	Votes	%	±%
Liberal National	Mark Stewart	13,578	52.70	+17.27
Labor	Meg Bishop	8,434	32.73	−21.77
Greens	Gordon King	2,463	9.56	+1.61
Family First	Matt Darragh	1,291	5.01	+5.01
Total formal votes		25,766	97.21	−0.43
Informal votes		739	2.79	+0.43
Turnout		26,505	88.94	−1.06
Two-party-preferred result
Liberal National	Mark Stewart	14,441	60.23	+21.02
Labor	Meg Bishop	9,535	39.77	−21.02
Liberal National gain from Labor		Swing	+21.02	

=== Surfers Paradise ===
2012 Queensland state election: Surfers Paradise
Party	Candidate	Votes	%	±%
Liberal National	John-Paul Langbroek	18,993	72.63	+13.61
Labor	Matthew Donovan	4,325	16.54	−10.93
Greens	Helen Wainwright	1,861	7.12	+0.58
Family First	Andrea Raymond	971	3.71	+3.71
Total formal votes		26,150	97.76	−0.11
Informal votes		600	2.24	+0.11
Turnout		26,750	86.70	+0.90
Two-party-preferred result
Liberal National	John-Paul Langbroek	19,688	79.50	+12.98
Labor	Matthew Donovan	5,078	20.50	−12.98
Liberal National hold		Swing	+12.98	

=== Thuringowa ===
2012 Queensland state election: Thuringowa
Party	Candidate	Votes	%	±%
Liberal National	Sam Cox	9,837	36.14	+2.28
Katter's Australian	Steve Todeschini	8,201	30.13	+30.13
Labor	Craig Wallace	7,448	27.36	−21.78
Greens	Bernie Williams	986	3.62	−0.64
Family First	Adrian Britton	749	2.75	+2.75
Total formal votes		27,221	97.30	+0.30
Informal votes		754	2.70	−0.30
Turnout		27,975	89.78	−0.08
Two-party-preferred result
Liberal National	Sam Cox	10,857	51.38	+9.85
Katter's Australian	Steve Todeschini	10,274	48.62	+48.62
Liberal National gain from Labor		Swing	N/A	

=== Toowoomba North ===
2012 Queensland state election: Toowoomba North
Party	Candidate	Votes	%	±%
Liberal National	Trevor Watts	14,898	49.75	+7.62
Labor	Kerry Shine	9,667	32.28	−15.42
Katter's Australian	Peter Pyke	3,485	11.64	+11.64
Greens	Frida Forsberg	1,461	4.88	−0.31
Independent	Neil Riethmuller	433	1.45	+0.41
Total formal votes		29,944	98.15	−0.02
Informal votes		563	1.85	+0.02
Turnout		30,507	92.36	+0.67
Two-party-preferred result
Liberal National	Trevor Watts	16,126	59.58	+12.80
Labor	Kerry Shine	10,942	40.42	−12.80
Liberal National gain from Labor		Swing	+12.80	

=== Toowoomba South ===
2012 Queensland state election: Toowoomba South
Party	Candidate	Votes	%	±%
Liberal National	John McVeigh	17,283	58.53	+5.04
Labor	Sam McFarlane	6,208	21.03	−16.40
Katter's Australian	David Curless	3,520	11.92	+11.92
Greens	Trevor Smith	1,619	5.48	+0.86
Independent	Charlene Phillips	896	3.03	+3.03
Total formal votes		29,526	97.95	−0.31
Informal votes		619	2.05	+0.31
Turnout		30,145	91.94	+0.06
Two-party-preferred result
Liberal National	John McVeigh	18,794	71.62	+13.40
Labor	Sam McFarlane	7,448	28.38	−13.40
Liberal National hold		Swing	+13.40	

=== Townsville ===
2012 Queensland state election: Townsville
Party	Candidate	Votes	%	±%
Liberal National	John Hathaway	10,011	38.63	−0.69
Labor	Mandy Johnstone	7,585	29.27	−15.10
Katter's Australian	Ray Grigg	5,654	21.82	+21.82
Greens	Jenny Stirling	1,988	7.67	−2.84
Family First	Michael Punshon	674	2.60	+0.22
Total formal votes		25,912	97.76	+0.20
Informal votes		595	2.24	−0.20
Turnout		26,507	87.50	+0.71
Two-party-preferred result
Liberal National	John Hathaway	11,937	54.83	+9.66
Labor	Mandy Johnstone	9,835	45.17	−9.66
Liberal National gain from Labor		Swing	+9.66	

=== Warrego ===
2012 Queensland state election: Warrego
Party	Candidate	Votes	%	±%
Liberal National	Howard Hobbs	13,770	58.13	−1.63
Katter's Australian	Robert Earixson	3,330	14.06	+14.06
Independent	Mark O'Brien	3,124	13.19	+13.19
Labor	David Bowden	2,995	12.64	−6.31
Greens	Graeme Maizey	470	1.98	+0.20
Total formal votes		23,689	98.40	−0.16
Informal votes		385	1.60	+0.16
Turnout		24,074	91.77	+0.88
Two-party-preferred result
Liberal National	Howard Hobbs	15,107	75.06	+0.72
Independent	Mark O'Brien	5,019	24.94	+24.94
Liberal National hold		Swing	+0.72	

=== Waterford ===
2012 Queensland state election: Waterford
Party	Candidate	Votes	%	±%
Liberal National	Mike Latter	11,228	39.62	+9.98
Labor	Evan Moorhead	10,947	38.63	−20.56
Katter's Australian	Albert Page	2,587	9.13	+9.13
Greens	Ray Smith	1,986	7.01	−1.30
Family First	Peter Farrar	1,201	4.24	+4.24
Independent	David Howse	392	1.38	−1.48
Total formal votes		28,341	96.59	−0.17
Informal votes		1,002	3.41	+0.17
Turnout		29,343	89.31	+0.18
Two-party-preferred result
Liberal National	Mike Latter	12,653	51.04	+17.50
Labor	Evan Moorhead	12,135	48.96	−17.50
Liberal National gain from Labor		Swing	+17.50	

=== Whitsunday ===
2012 Queensland state election: Whitsunday
Party	Candidate	Votes	%	±%
Liberal National	Jason Costigan	12,785	44.38	−0.07
Labor	Jan Jarratt	7,901	27.43	−22.28
Katter's Australian	Amanda Camm	6,424	22.30	+22.30
Greens	Jonathon Dykyj	1,695	5.88	+0.03
Total formal votes		28,805	98.32	+0.10
Informal votes		492	1.68	−0.10
Turnout		29,297	90.39	−0.48
Two-party-preferred result
Liberal National	Jason Costigan	14,778	60.67	+13.91
Labor	Jan Jarratt	9,578	39.33	−13.91
Liberal National gain from Labor		Swing	+13.91	

=== Woodridge ===
2012 Queensland state election: Woodridge
Party	Candidate	Votes	%	±%
Labor	Desley Scott	11,730	46.75	−22.09
Liberal National	Simon Dorries	9,012	35.92	+14.35
Family First	Justin Geange	2,199	8.76	+8.76
Greens	John Reddington	2,150	8.57	−1.01
Total formal votes		25,091	95.89	−1.15
Informal votes		1,075	4.11	+1.15
Turnout		26,166	88.04	−0.04
Two-party-preferred result
Labor	Desley Scott	12,787	55.80	−19.57
Liberal National	Simon Dorries	10,130	44.20	+19.57
Labor hold		Swing	−19.57	

=== Yeerongpilly ===
2012 Queensland state election: Yeerongpilly
Party	Candidate	Votes	%	±%
Liberal National	Carl Judge	12,356	43.22	+8.04
Labor	Simon Finn	9,875	34.54	−11.74
Greens	Libby Connors	4,563	15.96	+0.00
Katter's Australian	Kathleen Hewlett	1,312	4.59	+4.59
Family First	Alexandra Todd	480	1.68	+1.68
Total formal votes		28,586	98.28	−0.09
Informal votes		499	1.72	+0.09
Turnout		29,085	91.96	+0.87
Two-party-preferred result
Liberal National	Carl Judge	13,516	51.44	+10.17
Labor	Simon Finn	12,760	48.56	−10.17
Liberal National gain from Labor		Swing	+10.17	

== See also ==
- 2012 Queensland state election
- Candidates of the 2012 Queensland state election
