= Candidates of the 2012 Queensland state election =

This article provides information on candidates who stood for the 2012 Queensland state election on 24 March 2012.

== Retiring Members ==
=== Labor ===
- Julie Attwood (Mount Ommaney) — Announced 16 January 2012
- Desley Boyle (Cairns) — Announced 17 February 2011
- Paul Lucas (Lytton) — Announced 15 September 2011
- Carolyn Male (Pine Rivers) — Announced 3 February 2012
- John Mickel (Logan) — Announced 10 August 2011
- Lindy Nelson-Carr (Mundingburra) — Announced 28 March 2011
- Neil Roberts (Nudgee) — Announced 12 December 2011
- Stephen Robertson (Stretton) — Announced 27 March 2011
- Robert Schwarten (Rockhampton) — Announced 17 February 2011
- Judy Spence (Sunnybank) — Announced 15 December 2010

=== Liberal National ===
- Mike Horan (Toowoomba South) — Announced 26 March 2011

=== Independent ===
- Dorothy Pratt (Nanango) — Announced 15 April 2011

== Legislative Assembly ==
Sitting members are shown in bold text. Successful candidates are highlighted in the relevant colour. Where there is possible confusion, an asterisk (*) is also used.

Electorate	Held by	Labor candidate	LNP candidate	Greens candidate	KAP candidate	Other candidates
Albert	Labor	**Margaret Keech**	Mark Boothman	Petrina Maizey	Adam Hollis	Amanda Best (FFP)
Algester	Labor	**Karen Struthers**	Anthony Shorten	Justin Kerr	Gavan Duffy	
Ashgrove	Labor	**Kate Jones**	Campbell Newman	Sandra Bayley	Norman Wicks	Trevor Jones (Ind); Ian Nelson (ONP)
Aspley	LNP	Oskar Bronowicki	**Tracy Davis**	David Forrest		Allan Vincent (FFP)
Barron River	Labor	**Steve Wettenhall**	Michael Trout	Elaine Harding	Brendan Fitzgerald	Mike Squire (Ind)
Beaudesert	LNP	Brett McCreadie	Jon Krause	Andy Grodecki	**Aidan McLindon**	Walter Abrahamson (FFP); Jim Savage (ONP)
Brisbane Central	Labor	**Grace Grace**	Robert Cavallucci	Anne Boccabella		Ruth Bonnett (Ind)
Broadwater	Labor	**Peta-Kaye Croft**	Verity Barton	James Brydges	Peter McCambridge	Ron Clarke (Ind); Ben O'Brien (FFP); Liz Pforr (Ind)
Buderim	LNP	Chris Moore	**Steve Dickson**	Susan Etheridge	Lynette Bishop	Tony Moore (FFP)
Bulimba	Labor	**Di Farmer**	Aaron Dillaway	Justin Bennett		
Bundaberg	LNP	Cindy Hyland	**Jack Dempsey**	Peter Higgins	Doug Anderson	Trevor Versace (FFP); Peter Wyatt (Ind)
Bundamba	Labor	**Jo-Ann Miller**	Michael Kitzelmann	Jim Prentice	Bernard Gaynor	Deborah Acason (FFP); Albert Viskers (Ind); Angela Watson (Ind)
Burdekin	LNP	Angela Zyla	**Rosemary Menkens**	Pete Johnson	Ron Wadforth	Amanda Nickson (FFP)
Burleigh	Labor	**Christine Smith**	Michael Hart	Jane Power	Dean Fisher	Jeremy Fredericks (FFP)
Burnett	LNP	Stuart Tomlinson	Stephen Bennett	David Eastland	Kevin Pauling	**Rob Messenger** (Ind)
Cairns	Labor	Kirsten Lesina	Gavin King	Geoff Holland	Darren Hunt	John Piva (Ind)
Callide	LNP	Melissa Newton	**Jeff Seeney**	Camilla Percy	Steve Ensby	Duncan Scott (Ind)
Caloundra	LNP	Christine Anthony	**Mark McArdle**	Allan McKay		
Capalaba	Labor	**Michael Choi**	Steve Davies	Penny Allman-Payne	Graeme Moorhouse	David Chidgey (ONP)
Chatsworth	Labor	**Steve Kilburn**	Steve Minnikin	Jason Cooney	Sarah Henry	Axel Beard (FFP)
Clayfield	LNP	Brent Davidson	**Tim Nicholls**	Luke Morey	Will Keenan	
Cleveland	LNP	Jo Briskey	**Mark Robinson**	Brad Scott		Ronald Lambert (Ind)
Condamine	LNP	Nev Swan	**Ray Hopper**	Gabriele Tabikh	John Mathison	Shane White (Ind)
Cook	Labor	**Jason O'Brien**	David Kempton	George Riley	Lachlan Bensted	Jim Evans (ONP)
Coomera	LNP	Graeme Higgs	**Michael Crandon**	Chris Wisbey	Peter Cobb	Rowan Harrip (Ind)
Currumbin	LNP	Calum Hyslop	**Jann Stuckey**	David Wyatt	Steve Bowman	Royston Pickering (FFP)
Dalrymple	LNP	Benjamin Gertz	Liz Schmidt	Jess Jones	**Shane Knuth**	Jason Briskey (Ind); Christopher Williamson (Ind)
Everton	Labor	**Murray Watt**	Tim Mander	Bruce Hallett	Denym Witherow	
Ferny Grove	Labor	**Geoff Wilson**	Dale Shuttleworth	Howard Nielsen		
Gaven	LNP	Michael Riordan	**Alex Douglas**	Stephen Power	Brian Zimmerman	Bibe Roadley (FFP); Penny Toland (Ind)
Gladstone	Independent	Glenn Butcher	Russell Schroter	Andrew Blake	Anthony Beezley	**Liz Cunningham** (Ind)
Glass House	LNP	Ryan Moore	**Andrew Powell**	Stewart Luke	Peter Harris	
Greenslopes	Labor	**Cameron Dick**	Ian Kaye	Emma-Kate Rose		
Gregory	LNP	Jack O'Brien	**Vaughan Johnson**	Norman Weston	Pauline Williams	Bruce Currie (Ind)
Gympie	LNP	Ben Parker	**David Gibson**	Shena Macdonald	Shane Paulger	Santo Ferraro (ONP); Kathy Hawke (FFP)
Hervey Bay	LNP	Bernice Allen	**Ted Sorensen**	Glenn Martin	Isobel Dale	Troy Sullivan (FFP)
Hinchinbrook	LNP	Tony McGuire	**Andrew Cripps**	Pamela Monaghan	Jeff Knuth	Desmond Connors (Ind)
Inala	Labor	**Annastacia Palaszczuk**	Joanna Lindgren	Michael Quall	Ashley Dodd	
Indooroopilly	LNP	Oscar Schlamowitz	**Scott Emerson**	Charles Worringham		Andrew Mooney (FFP)
Ipswich	Labor	**Rachel Nolan**	Ian Berry	Veronica White	Will Keys	Robert Jeremy (Ind); Patricia Petersen (Ind); Tim Stieler (FFP)
Ipswich West	Labor	**Wayne Wendt**	Sean Choat	Ursula Monsiegneur	Justin Bowman	
Kallangur	Labor	**Mary-Anne O'Neill**	Trevor Ruthenberg	Rachel Doherty	Michael Bates	
Kawana	LNP	Bruce Garner	**Jarrod Bleijie**	Gabrielle Roberts	Paul Spencer	
Keppel	Labor	**Paul Hoolihan**	Bruce Young	Paul Bambrick	Luke Hargreaves	
Lockyer	LNP	James Wilson	**Ian Rickuss**	Clare Rudkin	David Neuendorf	
Logan	Labor	Linus Power	Michael Pucci	Julian Hinton	Tony Karamatic	Troy Aggett (ONP); Mike Kelly (Ind)
Lytton	Labor	Daniel Cheverton	Neil Symes	Daniel Crute	Jim Vote	Russell McVey (Ind)
Mackay	Labor	**Tim Mulherin**	John Kerslake	Luke Mathews	Lindsay Temple	
Mansfield	Labor	**Phil Reeves**	Ian Walker	Craig Sheehan	Ray Smith	Carolyn Ferrando (FFP); Jarrod Wirth (Ind)
Maroochydore	LNP	Ray Barber	**Fiona Simpson**	Rainee Skinner	Mark Maguire	
Maryborough	Independent	Ezra Burtt	Anne Maddern	Garry Claridge	Gordon Dale	**Chris Foley** (Ind)
Mermaid Beach	LNP	Rachel Paterson	**Ray Stevens**	Jenny Boddy	Ken Law	Ben Donovan (FFP)
Mirani	LNP	Jim Pearce	**Ted Malone**	Christine Carlisle	Bevan Pidgeon	Mike Crouther (FFP)
Moggill	LNP	Michael Nelson	**Bruce Flegg**	Jake Schoermer	Barry Searle	
Morayfield	Labor	**Mark Ryan**	Darren Grimwade	Paul Doherty	Stephen Beck	
Mount Coot-tha	Labor	**Andrew Fraser**	Saxon Rice	Adam Stone	Margaret Waterman	
Mount Isa	Labor	**Betty Kiernan**	Kevin Pattel	Colleen Williams	Rob Katter	
Mount Ommaney	Labor	Ben Marczyk	Tarnya Smith	Jenny Mulkearns	Douglas Newson	Jordan Brown (FFP); Rex Schmith (Ind)
Mudgeeraba	LNP	Aaron Santelises	**Ros Bates**	Sally Spain	Kevin Swan	Barrie Nicholson (FFP)
Mulgrave	Labor	**Curtis Pitt**	Robyn Quick	Jim Cavill	Damian Byrnes	
Mundingburra	Labor	Mark Harrison	David Crisafulli	Bret Fishley	David Moyle	Michael Waters (FFP)
Murrumba	Labor	**Dean Wells**	Reg Gulley	Rodney Blair	Paul Edwards	Sally-Anne Vincent (FFP)
Nanango	Independent	Virginia Clarke	Deb Frecklington	Grant Newson	Carl Rackemann	John Dalton (Ind); David Thomson (Ind)
Nicklin	Independent	Luke Moore	John Connolly	John Law	Matthew Smith	Cathy Turner (FFP); **Peter Wellington*** (Ind)
Noosa	LNP	Kurt Hopkins	**Glen Elmes**	Jim McDonald	Bob Jarvis	Bill Colley (Ind); Gemika Maloney (FFP)
Nudgee	Labor	Leanne Linard	Jason Woodforth	Anthony Pink	Terri Bell	Douglas Crowhurst (Ind); Claude Gonsalves (FFP)
Pine Rivers	Labor	Patrick Bulman	Seath Holswich	Di Clark	John Alexander	
Pumicestone	Labor	**Carryn Sullivan**	Lisa France	Jenny Fitzgibbon	Brandt King	
Redcliffe	Labor	**Lillian van Litsenburg**	Scott Driscoll	Noel Clothier	Bevan Collingwood	Kerri Dooley (FFP)
Redlands	LNP	Peter Seage	**Peter Dowling**	David Keogh		
Rockhampton	Labor	Bill Byrne	Gavin Finch	Bronwen Lloyd	Shane Guley	Bruce Diamond (Ind); Genevieve Ellis (FFP); Diane Hamilton (Ind); Chris Hooper (Ind)
Sandgate	Labor	**Vicky Darling**	Kerry Millard	Claire Ogden	John Dunkley	Mike Crook (Ind); Penny McCreery (FFP)
South Brisbane	Labor	**Anna Bligh**	Clem Grehan	Jo-Anne Bragg	Robert Wardrop	Liam Flenady (Ind)
Southern Downs	LNP	Suzanne Kidman	**Lawrence Springborg**	Michael Kane	Ade Larsen	John Spellman (FFP)
Southport	Labor	**Peter Lawlor**	Rob Molhoek	Stephen Dalton	Kevin Brown	Matthew Mackechnie (Ind)
Springwood	LNP	**Barbara Stone**	John Grant	Neil Cotter	Julian Tocaciu	Chris Lawrie (FFP)
Stafford	Labor	**Stirling Hinchliffe**	Chris Davis	Peter Jeremijenko	Karin Hunter	
Stretton	Labor	Duncan Pegg	Freya Ostapovitch	Brian Sadler		David Forde (Ind)
Sunnybank	Labor	Meg Bishop	Mark Stewart	Gordon King		Matt Darragh (FFP)
Surfers Paradise	LNP	Matthew Donovan	**John-Paul Langbroek**	Helen Wainwright		Andrea Raymond (FFP)
Thuringowa	Labor	**Craig Wallace**	Sam Cox	Bernie Williams	Steve Todeschini	Adrian Britton (FFP)
Toowoomba North	Labor	**Kerry Shine**	Trevor Watts	Frida Forsberg	Peter Pyke	Neil Riethmuller (Ind)
Toowoomba South	LNP	Sam McFarlane	John McVeigh	Trevor Smith	David Curless	Charlene Phillips (Ind)
Townsville	Labor	**Mandy Johnstone**	John Hathaway	Jenny Stirling	Ray Grigg	Michael Punshon (FFP)
Warrego	LNP	David Bowden	**Howard Hobbs**	Graeme Maizey	Robert Earixson	Mark O'Brien (Ind)
Waterford	Labor	**Evan Moorhead**	Mike Latter	Ray Smith	Albert Page	Peter Farrar (FFP); David Howse (Ind)
Whitsunday	Labor	**Jan Jarratt**	Jason Costigan	Jonathon Dykyj	Amanda Camm	
Woodridge	Labor	**Desley Scott**	Simon Dorries	John Reddington		Justin Geange (FFP)
Yeerongpilly	Labor	**Simon Finn**	Carl Judge	Libby Connors	Kathleen Hewlett	Alexandra Todd (FFP)

== Unregistered parties and groups ==
Some parties and groups that did not qualify for registration with the Electoral Commission of Queensland nevertheless endorsed candidates, who appeared on the ballot papers as independent or unaffiliated candidates.

- The Queensland Party endorsed Ruth Bonnett in Brisbane Central and David Thomson in Nanango.
- The Democratic Labor Party endorsed Rowan Harrip in Coomera.
- The Socialist Alliance endorsed Jason Briskey in Dalrymple, Mike Crook in Sandgate and Liam Flenady in South Brisbane.
- The North Queensland Party endorsed Mike Squire in Barron River, John Piva in Cairns and Des Connors in Hinchinbrook.
- The Middle Australian Party endorsed Russell McVey in Lytton.

== See also ==
- Members of the Queensland Legislative Assembly, 2009–2012
- Members of the Queensland Legislative Assembly, 2012–2015
- 2012 Queensland state election
