= Pre-election pendulum for the 2015 Queensland state election =

The following is a Mackerras pendulum prior to the 2015 Queensland state election.

"Very safe" seats require a swing of more than 20 points to change, "safe" seats 10–20 points to change, "fairly safe" seats 6–10 points, and "marginal" seats less than 6 points.

The following Mackerras pendulum worked by lining up all of the seats according to the percentage point margin post-election on a two-candidate-preferred basis. Following the 2012 election, Ray Hopper left the LNP to lead Katter's Australian Party while two further LNP MPs became independents (Carl Judge in the electorate of Yeerongpilly and Dr Alex Douglas in the electorate of Gaven), resulting in a total of 75 LNP seats, seven Labor seats, three Katter seats and four independent seats. By-elections in Redcliffe and Stafford saw Labor defeat the LNP, reducing the LNP to 73 seats with Labor on 9 seats.

Liberal National seats
Marginal
Bulimba	Aaron Dillaway	LNP	0.1 points
Maryborough	Anne Maddern	LNP	0.3 points v IND
Waterford	Mike Latter	LNP	1.0 point
Lytton	Neil Symes	LNP	1.6 points
Greenslopes	Ian Kaye	LNP	2.5 points
Sandgate	Kerry Millard	LNP	2.9 points
Nudgee	Jason Woodforth	LNP	3.1 points
Cook	David Kempton	LNP	3.4 points
Capalaba	Steve Davies	LNP	3.7 points
Ipswich	Ian Berry	LNP	4.2 points
Logan	Michael Pucci	LNP	4.8 points
Townsville	Robert Cavallucci	LNP	4.8 points
Brisbane Central	John Hathaway	LNP	4.9 points
Mount Coot-tha	Saxon Rice	LNP	5.4 points
Morayfield	Darren Grimwade	LNP	5.6 points
Ashgrove	Campbell Newman	LNP	5.7 points
Fairly safe
Keppel	Bruce Young	LNP	6.4 points
Thuringowa	Sam Cox	LNP	6.7 points
Ipswich West	Sean Choat	LNP	7.2 points
Cairns	Gavin King	LNP	8.9 points
Nanango	Deb Frecklington	LNP	9.0 points v KAP
Algester	Anthony Shorten	LNP	9.1 points
Barron River	Michael Trout	LNP	9.5 points
Ferny Grove	Dale Shuttleworth	LNP	9.5 points
Murrumba	Reg Gulley	LNP	9.5 points
Stretton	Freya Ostapovitch	LNP	9.6 points
Toowoomba North	Trevor Watts	LNP	9.6 points
Safe
Mundingburra	David Crisafulli	LNP	10.2 points
Sunnybank	Mark Stewart	LNP	10.2 points
Whitsunday	Jason Costigan	LNP	10.7 points
Burleigh	Michael Hart	LNP	11.0 points
Mansfield	Ian Walker	LNP	11.1 points
~~Mirani~~	~~Ted Malone~~	LNP	~~11.2 points~~
Broadwater	Verity Barton	LNP	11.3 points
Albert	Mark Boothman	LNP	11.9 points
Pumicestone	Lisa France	LNP	12.1 points
Kallangur	Trevor Ruthenberg	LNP	12.4 points
Everton	Tim Mander	LNP	13.2 points
Callide	Jeff Seeney	LNP	13.5 points v KAP
Pine Rivers	Seath Holswich	LNP	13.7 points
Chatsworth	Steve Minnikin	LNP	14.1 points
Southport	Rob Molhoek	LNP	14.7 points
Springwod	John Grant	LNP	15.4 points
Mount Ommaney	Tarnya Smith	LNP	16.5 points
~~Gympie~~	~~David Gibson~~	LNP	~~16.5 points v KAP~~
~~Burdekin~~	~~Rosemary Menkens~~	LNP	~~17.4 points~~
Burnett	Stephen Bennett	LNP	17.4 points
Cleveland	Mark Robinson	LNP	18.1 points
Bundaberg	Jack Dempsey	LNP	18.2 points
Lockyer	Ian Rickuss	LNP	18.8 points
Indooroopilly	Scott Emerson	LNP	19.5 points
Hinchinbrook	Andrew Cripps	LNP	18.9 points
Very safe
Condamine	Vacant	LNP	20.1 points v KAP
Currumbin	Jann Stuckey	LNP	20.2 points
Glass House	Andrew Poweell	LNP	20.4 points
Clayfield	Tim Nicholls	LNP	20.6 points
Maroochydore	Fiona Simpson	LNP	20.9 points
~~Redlands~~	~~Peter Dowling~~	LNP	~~21.1 points~~
Caloundra	Mark McArdle	LNP	21.2 points
Toowoomba South	John McVeigh	LNP	21.6 points
Aspley	Tracy Davis	LNP	21.7 points
Hervey Bay	Ted Sorensen	LNP	21.7 points
Beaudesert	Jon Krause	LNP	22.3 points
Coomera	Michael Crandon	LNP	23.3 points
~~Moggill~~	~~Bruce Flegg~~	LNP	~~23.9 points~~
~~Gregory~~	~~Vaughan Johnson~~	LNP	~~25.5 points~~
Noosa	Glen Elmes	LNP	25.5 points v GRN
Mudgeeraba	Ros Bates	LNP	25.9 points
Buderim	Steve Dickson	LNP	26.0 points
Mermaid Beach	Ray Stevens	LNP	26.0 points
Kawana	Jarrod Bleijie	LNP	26.3 points
~~Warrego~~	~~Howard Hobbs~~	LNP	~~28.1 points~~
Surfers Paradise	John-Paul Langbroek	LNP	29.5 points
Extremely safe
Southern Downs	Lawrence Springborg	LNP	30.4 points

Labor seats
Marginal
~~Mackay~~	~~Tim Mulherin~~	ALP	~~0.5 point~~
Mulgrave	Curtis Pitt	ALP	1.1 points
Bundamba	Jo-Ann Miller	ALP	1.8 points
Rockhampton	Bill Byrne	ALP	3.9 points
South Brisbane	Jackie Trad	ALP	4.7 points
~~Woodridge~~	~~Desley Scott~~	ALP	~~5.8 points~~
Fairly safe
Inala	Annastacia Palaszczuk	ALP	6.9 points
Redcliffe	Yvette D'Ath	ALP	7.1 points
Safe
Stafford	Dr Anthony Lynham	ALP	12.0 points
Crossbench seats
Yeerongpilly	Carl Judge	IND	1.4 points
Nicklin	Peter Wellington	IND	4.9 points
Mount Isa	Rob Katter	KAP	10.0 points v LNP
~~Gladstone~~	~~Liz Cunningham~~	IND	~~14.0 points v ALP~~
Dalrymple	Shane Knuth	KAP	15.2 points v LNP
Gaven	Dr Alex Douglas	IND	19.1 points v ALP
