= Electoral results for the district of Waterford =

Queensland, Australia, district election results

This is a list of electoral results for the electoral district of Waterford in Queensland state elections.

== Members for Waterford ==
| Member | Party | Term |
|---|---|---|
| Tom Barton | Labor | 1992–2006 |
| Evan Moorhead | Labor | 2006–2012 |
| Mike Latter | Liberal National | 2012–2015 |
| Shannon Fentiman | Labor | 2015–present |

== Election results ==
=== Elections in the 2020s ===
2024 Queensland state election: Waterford
| Party | Candidate | Votes | % | ±% |
|---|---|---|---|---|
| Labor | Shannon Fentiman | 14,621 | 47.13 | −7.37 |
| Liberal National | Jacob Heremaia | 8,733 | 28.15 | +2.75 |
| Greens | Kirsty Petersen | 2,784 | 8.97 | +1.97 |
| One Nation | Callum Whatmore | 2,099 | 6.77 | −2.33 |
| Legalise Cannabis | Julius Taylor | 1,509 | 4.86 | +4.86 |
| Family First | Karen Cloherty | 1,277 | 4.12 | +4.12 |
| Total formal votes | | 31,023 | 94.7 | |
| Informal votes | | 1,743 | 5.3 | |
| Turnout | | 32,766 | 82.87 | |
Two-party-preferred result
| Labor | Shannon Fentiman | 19,002 | 61.25 | −4.85 |
| Liberal National | Jacob Heremaia | 12,021 | 38.75 | +4.85 |
| Labor hold | | Swing | -4.85 | |

2020 Queensland state election: Waterford
| Party | Candidate | Votes | % | ±% |
|---|---|---|---|---|
| Labor | Shannon Fentiman | 14,759 | 54.52 | +6.81 |
| Liberal National | Andrew Caswell | 6,902 | 25.49 | +5.47 |
| One Nation | Kim Miller | 2,442 | 9.02 | −11.68 |
| Greens | Lachlan Smart | 1,882 | 6.95 | −0.37 |
| Independent | Lanai Carter | 688 | 2.54 | +2.54 |
| Civil Liberties & Motorists | Ben Olsen | 400 | 1.48 | +1.48 |
| Total formal votes | | 27,073 | 94.87 | +0.90 |
| Informal votes | | 1,463 | 5.13 | −0.90 |
| Turnout | | 28,536 | 83.54 | −0.88 |
Two-party-preferred result
| Labor | Shannon Fentiman | 17,873 | 66.02 | +4.90 |
| Liberal National | Andrew Caswell | 9,200 | 33.98 | −4.90 |
| Labor hold | | Swing | +4.90 | |

=== Elections in the 2010s ===
2017 Queensland state election: Waterford
| Party | Candidate | Votes | % | ±% |
|---|---|---|---|---|
| Labor | Shannon Fentiman | 12,501 | 47.7 | −4.5 |
| One Nation | Kim Miller | 5,423 | 20.7 | +20.7 |
| Liberal National | Felicity Westguard | 5,248 | 20.0 | −11.6 |
| Greens | Kirsty Petersen | 1,918 | 7.3 | −0.8 |
| Independent | Lee McKenzie McKinnon | 1,113 | 4.2 | +4.2 |
| Total formal votes | | 26,203 | 94.0 | −3.0 |
| Informal votes | | 1,681 | 6.0 | +3.0 |
| Turnout | | 27,884 | 84.4 | +3.4 |
Two-candidate-preferred result
| Labor | Shannon Fentiman | 15,918 | 60.7 | −2.4 |
| One Nation | Kim Miller | 10,285 | 39.3 | +39.3 |
| Labor hold | | Swing | −2.4 | |

2015 Queensland state election: Waterford
| Party | Candidate | Votes | % | ±% |
|---|---|---|---|---|
| Labor | Shannon Fentiman | 15,645 | 52.40 | +13.77 |
| Liberal National | Mike Latter | 9,347 | 31.30 | −8.31 |
| Greens | Ray Smith | 2,537 | 8.50 | +1.49 |
| Independent | Jeffrey Hodges | 1,454 | 4.87 | +3.49 |
| Independent | Jason Dickson | 876 | 2.93 | +1.55 |
| Total formal votes | | 29,859 | 96.95 | +0.37 |
| Informal votes | | 938 | 3.05 | −0.37 |
| Turnout | | 30,797 | 87.00 | −2.31 |
Two-party-preferred result
| Labor | Shannon Fentiman | 17,820 | 63.33 | +14.37 |
| Liberal National | Mike Latter | 10,319 | 36.67 | −14.37 |
| Labor gain from Liberal National | | Swing | +14.37 | |

2012 Queensland state election: Waterford
| Party | Candidate | Votes | % | ±% |
|---|---|---|---|---|
| Liberal National | Mike Latter | 11,228 | 39.62 | +9.98 |
| Labor | Evan Moorhead | 10,947 | 38.63 | −20.56 |
| Katter's Australian | Albert Page | 2,587 | 9.13 | +9.13 |
| Greens | Ray Smith | 1,986 | 7.01 | −1.30 |
| Family First | Peter Farrar | 1,201 | 4.24 | +4.24 |
| Independent | David Howse | 392 | 1.38 | −1.48 |
| Total formal votes | | 28,341 | 96.59 | −0.17 |
| Informal votes | | 1,002 | 3.41 | +0.17 |
| Turnout | | 29,343 | 89.31 | +0.18 |
Two-party-preferred result
| Liberal National | Mike Latter | 12,653 | 51.04 | +17.50 |
| Labor | Evan Moorhead | 12,135 | 48.96 | −17.50 |
| Liberal National gain from Labor | | Swing | +17.50 | |

=== Elections in the 2000s ===
2009 Queensland state election: Waterford
| Party | Candidate | Votes | % | ±% |
|---|---|---|---|---|
| Labor | Evan Moorhead | 16,273 | 59.2 | +1.1 |
| Liberal National | Freya Ostapovitch | 8,148 | 29.6 | +1.4 |
| Greens | Dale Taylor | 2,286 | 8.3 | +1.4 |
| Independent | David Howse | 787 | 2.9 | +2.9 |
| Total formal votes | | 27,494 | 96.4 | |
| Informal votes | | 920 | 3.6 | |
| Turnout | | 28,414 | 89.1 | |
Two-party-preferred result
| Labor | Evan Moorhead | 17,223 | 66.5 | +0.2 |
| Liberal National | Freya Ostapovitch | 8,693 | 33.5 | −0.2 |
| Labor hold | | Swing | +0.2 | |

2006 Queensland state election: Waterford
| Party | Candidate | Votes | % | ±% |
|---|---|---|---|---|
| Labor | Evan Moorhead | 13,624 | 57.7 | +0.4 |
| Liberal | Tracy Elson | 6,748 | 28.6 | +1.2 |
| Greens | Stan Cajdler | 1,635 | 6.9 | +0.3 |
| Independent | Sue Price | 1,594 | 6.8 | +6.8 |
| Total formal votes | | 23,601 | 96.8 | −0.4 |
| Informal votes | | 789 | 3.2 | +0.4 |
| Turnout | | 24,390 | 88.7 | −1.0 |
Two-party-preferred result
| Labor | Evan Moorhead | 14,347 | 65.8 | −0.7 |
| Liberal | Tracy Elson | 7,441 | 34.2 | +0.7 |
| Labor hold | | Swing | −0.7 | |

2004 Queensland state election: Waterford
| Party | Candidate | Votes | % | ±% |
|---|---|---|---|---|
| Labor | Tom Barton | 13,266 | 57.3 | +1.1 |
| Liberal | Andrew Harbour | 6,334 | 27.4 | +12.6 |
| One Nation | Leonce Kealy | 2,000 | 8.6 | −16.2 |
| Greens | Serge Le Royer | 1,532 | 6.6 | +6.6 |
| Total formal votes | | 23,132 | 97.2 | −0.0 |
| Informal votes | | 661 | 2.8 | +0.0 |
| Turnout | | 23,793 | 89.7 | −1.6 |
Two-party-preferred result
| Labor | Tom Barton | 14,214 | 66.5 | −1.5 |
| Liberal | Andrew Harbour | 7,153 | 33.5 | +33.5 |
| Labor hold | | Swing | −1.5 | |

2001 Queensland state election: Waterford
| Party | Candidate | Votes | % | ±% |
|---|---|---|---|---|
| Labor | Tom Barton | 12,378 | 56.2 | +9.3 |
| One Nation | June Woodward | 5,465 | 24.8 | −3.8 |
| Liberal | Richard Somers | 3,267 | 14.8 | −8.6 |
| Independent | David Howse | 910 | 4.1 | +4.1 |
| Total formal votes | | 22,020 | 97.2 | |
| Informal votes | | 625 | 2.8 | |
| Turnout | | 22,645 | 91.3 | |
Two-candidate-preferred result
| Labor | Tom Barton | 13,755 | 68.0 | +11.4 |
| One Nation | June Woodward | 6,470 | 32.0 | −11.4 |
| Labor hold | | Swing | +11.4 | |

=== Elections in the 1990s ===
1998 Queensland state election: Waterford
| Party | Candidate | Votes | % | ±% |
|---|---|---|---|---|
| Labor | Tom Barton | 10,494 | 46.2 | −12.9 |
| One Nation | Jim Hebbard | 6,643 | 29.3 | +29.3 |
| Liberal | Aidan McLindon | 5,571 | 24.5 | −16.4 |
| Total formal votes | | 22,708 | 98.3 | +1.4 |
| Informal votes | | 394 | 1.7 | −1.4 |
| Turnout | | 23,102 | 90.7 | +2.6 |
Two-candidate-preferred result
| Labor | Tom Barton | 11,892 | 55.2 | −3.9 |
| One Nation | Jim Hebbard | 9,647 | 44.8 | +44.8 |
| Labor hold | | Swing | −3.9 | |

1995 Queensland state election: Waterford
| Party | Candidate | Votes | % | ±% |
|---|---|---|---|---|
| Labor | Tom Barton | 11,891 | 59.1 | +4.2 |
| Liberal | Raymond Hamey | 8,225 | 40.9 | +18.9 |
| Total formal votes | | 20,116 | 96.8 | +0.1 |
| Informal votes | | 655 | 3.2 | −0.1 |
| Turnout | | 20,771 | 88.1 | |
| Labor hold | | Swing | −1.7 | |

1992 Queensland state election: Waterford
| Party | Candidate | Votes | % | ±% |
|---|---|---|---|---|
| Labor | Tom Barton | 10,276 | 54.9 | −8.1 |
| Liberal | Ray Hackwood | 4,123 | 22.0 | +0.3 |
| National | Neil Conway | 2,906 | 15.5 | +0.7 |
| Independent | Owen Dare | 875 | 4.7 | +4.7 |
| Independent | John Johnstone | 543 | 2.9 | +2.9 |
| Total formal votes | | 18,723 | 96.8 | |
| Informal votes | | 624 | 3.2 | |
| Turnout | | 19,347 | 89.1 | |
Two-party-preferred result
| Labor | Tom Barton | 10,879 | 60.8 | −3.4 |
| Liberal | Ray Hackwood | 7,007 | 39.2 | +3.4 |
| Labor hold | | Swing | −3.4 | |
