= 2012 Queensland state election =

- 24 March 2012

All 89 seats in the Legislative Assembly of Queensland 45 Assembly seats were needed for a majority
- Turnout: 91.00% (▲0.07 pp)
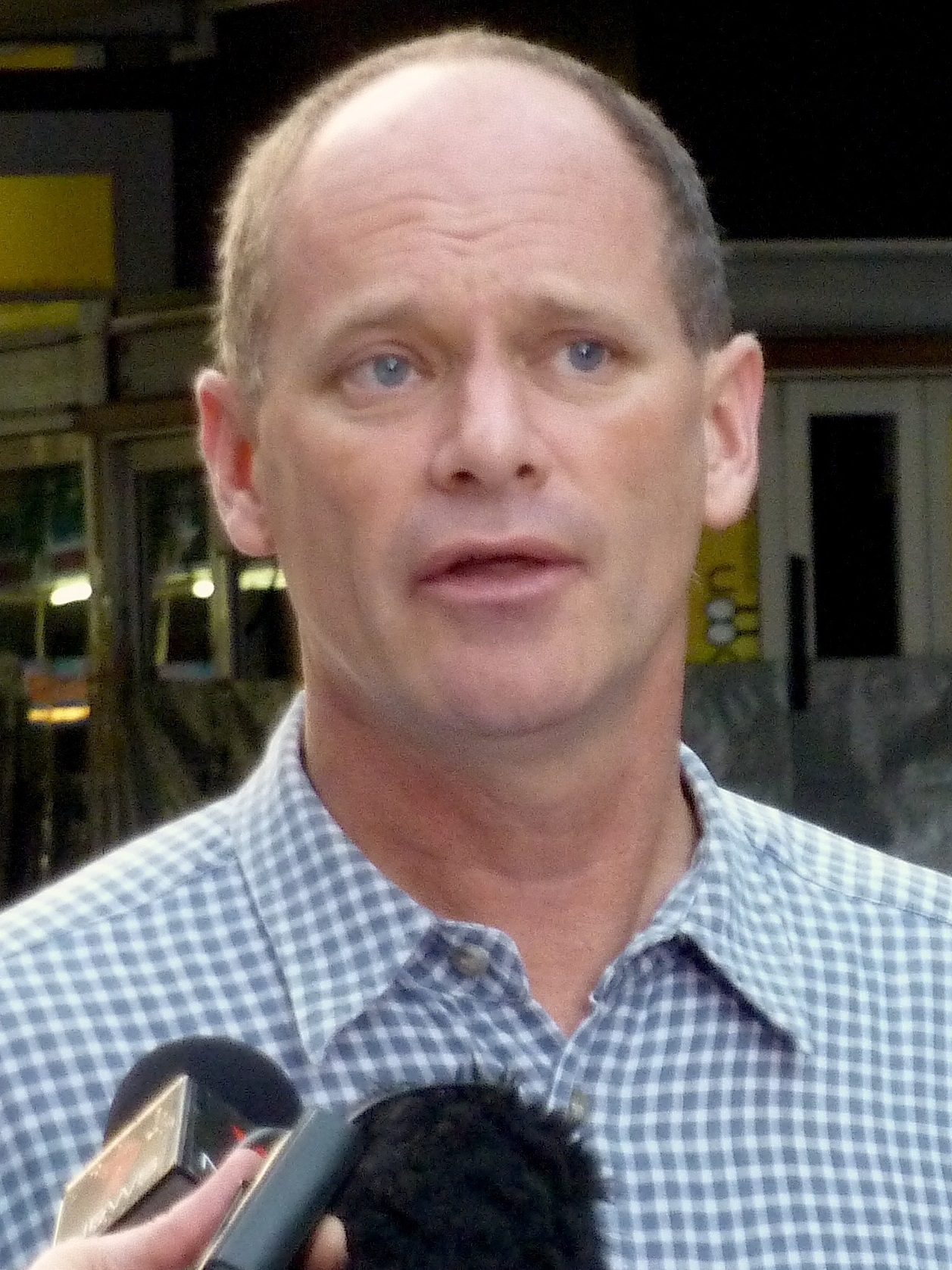

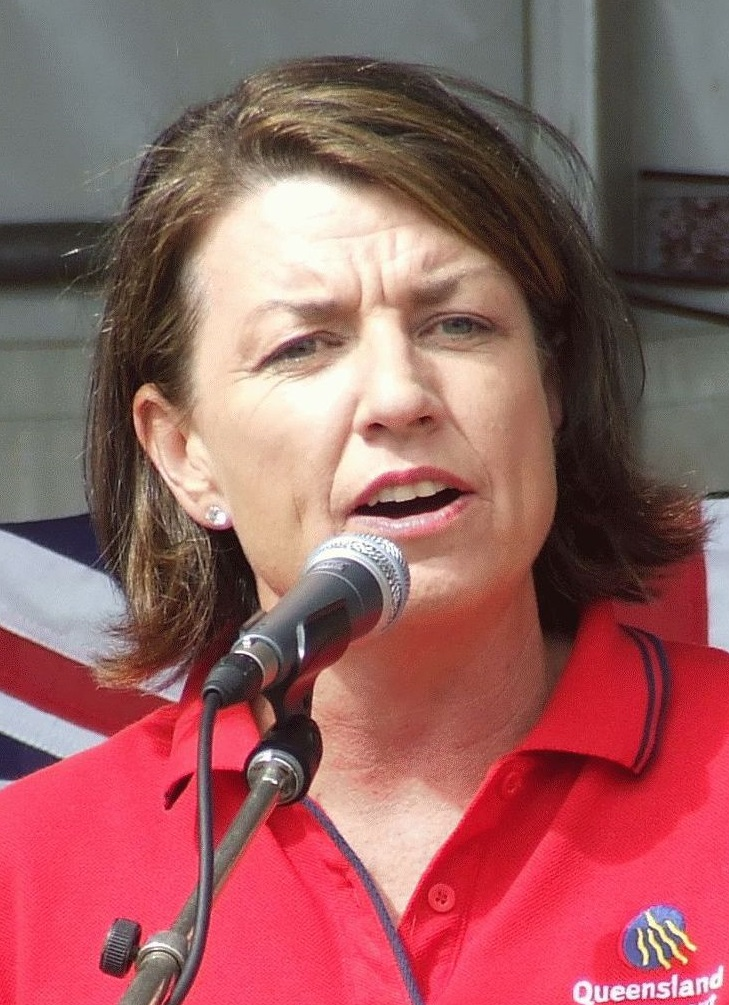

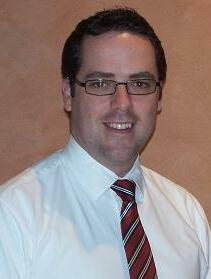
	First party	Second party	Third party
Leader	Campbell Newman	Anna Bligh	Aidan McLindon
Party	Liberal National	Labor	Katter's Australian
Leader since	22 March 2011	13 September 2007	9 August 2011
Leader's seat	Ashgrove (won seat)	South Brisbane	Beaudesert (lost seat)
Last election	34 seats, 41.60%	51 seats, 42.25%	Did not contest
Seats before	33 seats (Note: Aidan McLindon, the then-Member for Beaudesert, resigned from the LNP in 2010 and later created The Queensland Party, which merged with Katter's Australian Party in 2011, resulting in him becoming their state leader.)	51 seats	1 seat (Note: McLindon joined the KAP in 2011 and became their state leader after merging his Queensland Party into the KAP. He was elected in 2009 as a member of the LNP.)
Seats won	78	7	2
Seat change	▲45	▼44	▲1
Popular vote	1,214,553	652,092	282,098
Percentage	49.7%	26.7%	11.5%
Swing	▲8.1	▼15.6	▲11.5
TPP	62.8%	37.2%
TPP swing	▲13.7	▼13.7
- Winning margin by electorate.
Premier before election
Anna Bligh
Labor
Elected Premier
Campbell Newman
Liberal National

The 2012 Queensland state election was held on 24 March 2012 to elect all 89 members of the Legislative Assembly, a unicameral parliament.

The Labor Party (ALP), led by Premier Anna Bligh, was defeated by the opposition Liberal National Party (LNP), led by Campbell Newman in a landslide victory. The ALP was attempting to win a ninth consecutive election victory, having won every general election since 1989, despite being out of office between 1996 and 1998. Katter's Australian Party contested its first election. Before the election, it held two seats whose members had been elected as LNP candidates.

Labor suffered one of the worst defeats of a state government since Federation, and the worst defeat of a sitting government in Queensland history. From 51 seats in 2009, it was reduced to only seven seats, suffering a swing of 15.6 percentage points. The LNP won a majority for the first time in its history, jumping from 34 to 78 seats to win the largest majority government in Queensland history. It was the first outright non-Labor majority since the Queensland Nationals won their last victory in 1986. Katter's Australian Party won two seats, though leader Aidan McLindon lost his own seat. The remaining two seats were taken by independents. Newman took office two days after the election.

Historically, Queenslanders have given their governments long tenures in office. The 2012 election was only the sixth time that Queenslanders had ousted a sitting government since 1915.

== Background ==
In choosing 24 March, Bligh made the unusual step of announcing the election date two months prior. Bligh was criticised for selecting a date which required the postponement of local government elections. Bligh has said that date allowed Queenslanders to view the final report of the Commission of Inquiry into the 2010–11 Queensland floods before they vote. Normal practice in Australia is for parliament to be dissolved at the time of the election announcement. However, Bligh did not formally ask Governor Penelope Wensley to dissolve Parliament until 19 February. Wensley granted the request, formally beginning the 35-day campaign. By not asking for a dissolution in January, Bligh avoided placing the government in caretaker mode for 25 days.

=== Leadership of the Liberal National Party ===
Campbell Newman was elected leader of the LNP in early 2011 while he was the Lord Mayor of Brisbane. Standard practice calls for an MP from a safe seat to resign so that a newly elected leader can get into parliament via a by-election, though this is not universally followed. However, when Newman won the leadership in 2011, a by-election could not be arranged. For this reason, Jeff Seeney was elected as interim parliamentary leader of the LNP and Leader of the Opposition. Newman led the LNP election team from outside of parliament, often sitting at the galleries, and simultaneously contested the seat of Ashgrove as the LNP candidate.

=== Disendorsed candidates ===
The Liberal National Party disendorsed two candidates for the Gold Coast seat of Broadwater. Richard Townson was caught drink driving with a blood alcohol content of 0.07 when he was in a police random breath test. Cameron Caldwell was disendorsed when he confirmed he had attended a Gold Coast swingers' club.

The Australian Labor Party disendorsed candidate Peter Watson for the seat of Southern Downs and expelled him from the party for making racist and homophobic remarks online.

=== Katter appeal on ballot papers ===
On 2 March 2012, Katter's Australian Party sought an injunction in the Supreme Court of Queensland to have more than 2 million ballot papers shredded and reprinted. The party said the Queensland Electoral Commission used the party's abbreviated name, "The Australian Party", instead of its registered name, "Katter's Australian Party (Qld Division)", which the party claimed could confuse voters. Bligh said that her lawyers had advised her to reschedule the election if Katter's challenge succeeded.

On 7 March, Supreme Court Justice Roslyn Atkinson referred the matter to the Queensland Court of Appeal as matters of constitutional law in the case were outside her jurisdiction. The Court of Appeal rejected the constitutional arguments and dismissed the appeal the following day.

== Key dates ==
Date	Event
19 February 2012	Writ of election issued by the Governor
25 February 2012	Close of electoral rolls
27 February 2012	Close of nominations
24 March 2012	Polling day, between the hours of 8am and 6pm
26 March 2012	Interim Newman Ministry was sworn in
3 April 2012	Full Newman Ministry sworn
23 April 2012	Writ returned and results formally declared
15 May 2012	54th Parliament convened

== Retiring members ==
=== Labor ===
- Julie Attwood (Mount Ommaney) – Announced 16 January 2012
- Desley Boyle (Cairns) – Announced 17 February 2011
- Paul Lucas (Lytton) – Announced 15 September 2011
- Carolyn Male (Pine Rivers) – Announced 3 February 2012
- John Mickel (Logan) – Announced 10 August 2011
- Lindy Nelson-Carr (Mundingburra) – Announced 28 March 2011
- Neil Roberts (Nudgee) – Announced 12 December 2011
- Stephen Robertson (Stretton) – Announced 27 March 2011
- Robert Schwarten (Rockhampton) – Announced 17 February 2011
- Judy Spence (Sunnybank) – Announced 15 December 2010

=== Liberal National ===
- Mike Horan (Toowoomba South) – Announced 26 March 2011

=== Independent ===
- Dorothy Pratt (Nanango) – Announced 15 April 2011

== Results ==
The estimated two-party preferred result was 37.2% for Labor and 62.8% for the LNP, a swing of 13.7% from Labor's result of 2009.

The LNP had been unbackable favourites to win the election. By the time the writs were issued, they had led opinion polling for over a year, and had been ahead of Labor on all but one Newspoll since 2010.

The LNP swept Labor from power in a massive landslide, taking 78 seats to Labor's seven on a two-party-preferred swing of 13.7 points away from Labor. The 44-seat loss is double the 22-seat loss suffered by the Nationals in the 1989 election, the previous record for the worst defeat of a sitting government in Queensland history. The 13.7-percent swing is one of the largest against a sitting state government in Australia since World War II.

In the process, the LNP won many seats considered Labor heartland. It broke Labor's longstanding grip on Brisbane, taking all but three of the city's 40 seats, some on swings of 10 points or more. By comparison, Labor went into the election holding all but six seats in the capital, which had been its power base for over 20 years. In every election since the "one vote, one value" reforms of the Goss government, Labor had won at least 30 seats in Brisbane. The LNP also won every seat on the Gold Coast while strengthening its hold on its traditional heartlands in provincial and rural Queensland. Ten members of Bligh's cabinet were defeated. Newman won Ashgrove handily, defeating Labor's Kate Jones on a 13-point swing, almost double the 7-point swing he needed to take the seat off Labor.

ABC News called the election for the LNP at 6:48 pm Queensland time, less than an hour after counting began. Bligh conceded defeat at 8:25 pm, and Newman publicly claimed victory 20 minutes later.

The day after the election, Bligh resigned as premier and Queensland Labor leader. She also announced she was resigning from parliament on 30 March and retiring from politics, triggering a by-election in her seat of South Brisbane. An hour later, Newman, who at the time did not know that Bligh had resigned, announced that he would be sworn in as premier on 26 March, heading an interim three-man cabinet composed of himself, Seeney and Tim Nicholls. Although Newman's victory was beyond doubt, counting was still under way in some seats. Bligh handed in her resignation later on the afternoon of 25 March, but remained as caretaker until Newman was sworn in the next day.

Labor was reduced to its smallest presence in the legislature on record, outdoing its previous low in 1974, when it was cut down to a "cricket team" of only 11 members at the height of Joh Bjelke-Petersen's power. Indeed, Michael Madigan of The Courier-Mail wrote that Labor had been reduced to a "water polo squad."

Although Labor came up two seats short of official party status in the legislature, Newman promised that Labor would be "properly resourced as an opposition".

Party	Votes	%	+/–	Seats	+/–
Liberal National	1,214,553	49.66	▲8.06	78	▲44
Labor	652,092	26.66	▼15.59	7	▼44
Katter's Australian Party	282,098	11.53	New	2	New
Greens	184,147	7.53	▼0.84	0	0
Independents	77,282	3.16	▼3.42	2	▼2
Family First	33,269	1.36	▲0.54	0	0
One Nation	2,525	0.10	▼0.28	0	0
Total	2,445,966	100.00	–	89	–
Valid votes	2,445,966	97.85			
Invalid/blank votes	53,797	2.15	▲0.21		
Total votes	2,499,763	100.00	–		
Registered voters/turnout	2,746,844	91.00	▲0.07		
Two-party-preferred
Liberal National		62.8	▲13.7		
Labor		37.2	▼13.7		
Total					
Source: The two-party preferred summary is an estimate by Antony Green using a methodology by Malcolm Mackerras.

Popular vote
LNP	49.66%
Labor	26.66%
Katter's	11.53%
Greens	7.53%
Family First	1.36%
One Nation	0.10%
Independents	3.16%

Two-party preferred vote
LNP	62.80%
Labor	37.20%

Seats
LNP	87.64%
Labor	7.87%
Katter's	2.25%
Independents	2.25%

== Seats changing hands ==
Seat	2009 Election			Swing	2012 Election		
Seat	Party	Member	Margin	Swing	Margin	Member	Party
Albert	Labor	Margaret Keech	6.47	–18.36	11.89	Mark Boothman	Liberal National
Algester	Labor	Karen Struthers	9.21	–18.36	9.15	Anthony Shorten	Liberal National
Ashgrove	Labor	Kate Jones	7.10	–12.79	5.70	Campbell Newman	Liberal National
Barron River	Labor	Steve Wettenhall	2.32	–11.81	9.48	Michael Trout	Liberal National
Brisbane Central	Labor	Grace Grace	5.97	–10.85	4.88	Robert Cavallucci	Liberal National
Broadwater	Labor	Peta-Kaye Croft	2.03	–13.32	11.29	Verity Barton	Liberal National
Bulimba	Labor	Di Farmer	7.77	–7.91	0.14	Aaron Dillaway	Liberal National
Burleigh	Labor	Christine Smith	4.90	–15.95	11.05	Michael Hart	Liberal National
Cairns	Labor	Desley Boyle	4.15	–13.03	8.87	Gavin King	Liberal National
Capalaba	Labor	Michael Choi	9.67	–13.40	3.73	Steve Davies	Liberal National
Chatsworth	Labor	Steve Kilburn	0.14	–14.08	13.94	Steve Minnikin	Liberal National
Cook	Labor	Jason O'Brien	2.24	–5.68	3.43	David Kempton	Liberal National
Dalrymple	Liberal National	Shane Knuth^{1}	5.18	–20.40	15.22	Shane Knuth	Katter's Australian
Everton	Labor	Murray Watt	1.39	–14.54	13.15	Tim Mander	Liberal National
Ferny Grove	Labor	Geoff Wilson	4.49	–14.02	9.52	Dale Shuttleworth	Liberal National
Greenslopes	Labor	Cameron Dick	6.94	–9.40	2.45	Ian Kaye	Liberal National
Ipswich	Labor	Rachel Nolan	16.71	–20.90	4.19	Ian Berry	Liberal National
Ipswich West	Labor	Wayne Wendt	9.55	–16.71	7.16	Sean Choat	Liberal National
Kallangur	Labor	Mary-Anne O'Neill	4.63	–17.06	12.43	Trevor Ruthenberg	Liberal National
Keppel	Labor	Paul Hoolihan	7.62	–14.02	6.39	Bruce Young	Liberal National
Logan	Labor	John Mickel	13.93	–18.73	4.80	Michael Pucci	Liberal National
Lytton	Labor	Paul Lucas	12.21	–13.79	1.58	Neil Symes	Liberal National
Mansfield	Labor	Phil Reeves	4.39	–15.53	11.14	Ian Walker	Liberal National
Maryborough	Independent	Chris Foley	16.83	–17.14	0.31	Anne Maddern	Liberal National
Morayfield	Labor	Mark Ryan	9.13	–14.71	5.57	Darren Grimwade	Liberal National
Mount Coot-tha	Labor	Andrew Fraser	5.25	–10.60	5.36	Saxon Rice	Liberal National
Mount Isa	Labor	Betty Kiernan	5.72	15.76	10.04	Robbie Katter	Katter's Australian
Mount Ommaney	Labor	Julie Attwood	4.79	–21.27	16.48	Tarnya Smith	Liberal National
Mundingburra	Labor	Lindy Nelson-Carr	6.59	–16.78	10.19	David Crisafulli	Liberal National
Murrumba	Labor	Dean Wells	7.21	–16.74	9.52	Reg Gulley	Liberal National
Nanango	Independent	Dorothy Pratt	2.90	-11.88	8.98	Deb Frecklington	Liberal National
Nudgee	Labor	Neil Roberts	4.26	–17.37	3.11	Jason Woodforth	Liberal National
Pine Rivers	Labor	Carolyn Male	4.61	–18.27	13.66	Seath Holswich	Liberal National
Pumicestone	Labor	Carryn Sullivan	4.99	–17.06	12.07	Lisa France	Liberal National
Redcliffe	Labor	Lillian van Litsenburg	5.57	–15.67	10.10	Scott Driscoll	Liberal National
Sandgate	Labor	Vicky Darling	12.37	–15.24	2.87	Kerry Millard	Liberal National
Southport	Labor	Peter Lawlor	3.48	–18.20	14.72	Rob Molhoek	Liberal National
Springwood	Labor	Barbara Stone	4.08	–19.48	15.39	John Grant	Liberal National
Stafford	Labor	Stirling Hinchliffe	7.29	–14.35	7.06	Chris Davis	Liberal National
Stretton	Labor	Stephen Robertson	9.48	−19.04	9.55	Freya Ostapovitch	Liberal National
Sunnybank	Labor	Judy Spence	10.79	−21.02	10.23	Mark Stewart	Liberal National
Thuringowa	Labor	Craig Wallace	8.47	−9.85	1.38	Sam Cox	Liberal National
Toowoomba North	Labor	Kerry Shine	3.22	–12.80	9.58	Trevor Watts	Liberal National
Townsville	Labor	Mandy Johnstone	4.02	−8.84	4.83	John Hathaway	Liberal National
Waterford	Labor	Evan Moorhead	16.46	−17.50	1.04	Mike Latter	Liberal National
Whitsunday	Labor	Jan Jarratt	3.24	−13.91	10.67	Jason Costigan	Liberal National
Yeerongpilly	Labor	Simon Finn	8.73	−10.17	1.44	Carl Judge	Liberal National

- Members listed in italics did not contest their seat at this election.
- ^{1} Shane Knuth was elected as a member of the Liberal National Party, but resigned and joined Katter's Australian Party in 2011.
- The Liberal National Party also retained the seats of Beaudesert, where the sitting Liberal National member had resigned and contested the election as a member of Katter's Australian Party. The Liberal National Party also retained the seat of Burnett, where the sitting Liberal National member had resigned and contested the election as an independent.

== Post-election pendulum ==
Government seats
Marginal
Bulimba	Aaron Dillaway	LNP	0.14%
Maryborough	Anne Maddern	LNP	0.31% v IND
Waterford	Mike Latter	LNP	1.04%
Thuringowa	Sam Cox	LNP	1.38% v KAP
Yeerongpilly	Carl Judge	LNP	1.44%
Lytton	Neil Symes	LNP	1.58%
Greenslopes	Ian Kaye	LNP	2.45%
Sandgate	Kerry Millard	LNP	2.87%
Nudgee	Jason Woodforth	LNP	3.11%
Cook	David Kempton	LNP	3.43%
Hinchinbrook	Andrew Cripps	LNP	3.63% v KAP
Capalaba	Steve Davies	LNP	3.73%
Ipswich	Ian Berry	LNP	4.19%
Logan	Michael Pucci	LNP	4.80%
Townsville	John Hathaway	LNP	4.83%
Brisbane Central	Robert Cavallucci	LNP	4.88%
Mount Coot-tha	Saxon Rice	LNP	5.36%
Morayfield	Darren Grimwade	LNP	5.57%
Ashgrove	Campbell Newman	LNP	5.70%
Fairly safe
Keppel	Bruce Young	LNP	6.39%
Stafford	Chris Davis	LNP	7.06%
Ipswich West	Sean Choat	LNP	7.16%
Burnett	Stephen Bennett	LNP	8.50% v IND
Cairns	Gavin King	LNP	8.87%
Nanango	Deb Frecklington	LNP	8.98% v KAP
Algester	Anthony Shorten	LNP	9.15%
Barron River	Michael Trout	LNP	9.48%
Ferny Grove	Dale Shuttleworth	LNP	9.52%
Murrumba	Reg Gulley	LNP	9.52%
Stretton	Freya Ostapovitch	LNP	9.55%
Toowoomba North	Trevor Watts	LNP	9.58%
Safe
Redcliffe	Scott Driscoll	LNP	10.10%
Mundingburra	David Crisafulli	LNP	10.19%
Sunnybank	Mark Stewart	LNP	10.23%
Beaudesert	Jon Krause	LNP	10.56% v KAP
Whitsunday	Jason Costigan	LNP	10.67%
Burleigh	Michael Hart	LNP	11.05%
Mansfield	Ian Walker	LNP	11.14%
Mirani	Ted Malone	LNP	11.19%
Broadwater	Verity Barton	LNP	11.29%
Albert	Mark Boothman	LNP	11.89%
Pumicestone	Lisa France	LNP	12.07%
Kallangur	Trevor Ruthenberg	LNP	12.43%
Burdekin	Rosemary Menkens	LNP	12.47% v KAP
Everton	Tim Mander	LNP	13.15%
Callide	Jeff Seeney	LNP	13.51% v KAP
Pine Rivers	Seath Holswich	LNP	13.66%
Chatsworth	Steve Minnikin	LNP	13.94%
Southport	Rob Molhoek	LNP	14.72%
Lockyer	Ian Rickuss	LNP	14.87% v KAP
Springwood	John Grant	LNP	15.39%
Mount Ommaney	Tarnya Smith	LNP	16.48%
Gympie	David Gibson	LNP	17.26% v KAP
Cleveland	Mark Robinson	LNP	18.10%
Bundaberg	Jack Dempsey	LNP	18.17%
Gaven	Alex Douglas	LNP	19.10%
Indooroopilly	Scott Emerson	LNP	19.55%
Very safe
Condamine	Ray Hopper	LNP	20.10% v KAP
Currumbin	Jann Stuckey	LNP	20.18%
Glass House	Andrew Powell	LNP	20.39%
Clayfield	Tim Nicholls	LNP	20.56%
Maroochydore	Fiona Simpson	LNP	20.93%
Redlands	Peter Dowling	LNP	21.10%
Caloundra	Mark McArdle	LNP	21.23%
Toowoomba South	John McVeigh	LNP	21.62%
Hervey Bay	Ted Sorensen	LNP	21.72%
Aspley	Tracy Davis	LNP	21.75%
Coomera	Michael Crandon	LNP	23.26%
Moggill	Bruce Flegg	LNP	23.91%
Warrego	Howard Hobbs	LNP	25.06%
Noosa	Glen Elmes	LNP	25.46% v GRN
Gregory	Vaughan Johnson	LNP	25.48%
Mudgeeraba	Ros Bates	LNP	25.93%
Buderim	Steve Dickson	LNP	26.01%
Mermaid Beach	Ray Stevens	LNP	26.05%
Kawana	Jarrod Bleijie	LNP	26.26%
Surfers Paradise	John-Paul Langbroek	LNP	29.50%
Southern Downs	Lawrence Springborg	LNP	29.77% v KAP

Non-government seats
Marginal
Mackay	Tim Mulherin	ALP	0.53%
Mulgrave	Curtis Pitt	ALP	1.15%
Bundamba	Jo-Ann Miller	ALP	1.82%
Rockhampton	William Byrne	ALP	3.95%
South Brisbane	Anna Bligh	ALP	4.66%
Woodridge	Desley Scott	ALP	5.80%
Fairly safe
Inala	Annastacia Palaszczuk	ALP	6.90%
Crossbench seats
Nicklin	Peter Wellington	IND	4.55% v LNP
Mount Isa	Robbie Katter	KAP	10.04% v LNP
Gladstone	Liz Cunningham	IND	14.03% v ALP
Dalrymple	Shane Knuth	KAP	15.22% v LNP

== Subsequent changes ==
- On 30 March 2012, former Premier Anna Bligh (South Brisbane) resigned. At the by-election on 28 April 2012, Jackie Trad retained the electorate for the Labor Party.
- On 28 November 2012, Ray Hopper (Condamine) resigned from the Liberal National Party and joined Katter's Australian Party.
- On 30 November 2012, Carl Judge (Yeerongpilly) resigned from the Liberal National Party and sat as an independent. He then joined the Palmer United Party on 7 June 2013, but resigned on 8 October 2014 and again sat as an independent.
- On 1 December 2012, Alex Douglas (Gaven) resigned from the Liberal National Party and sat as an independent. He then joined the Palmer United Party on 7 Jun 2013, but resigned on 18 August 2014 and again sat as an independent.
- On 19 April 2013, Scott Driscoll (Redcliffe) resigned from the Liberal National Party and sat as an independent. On 19 November 2013 he resigned. At the by-election on 22 February 2014, Yvette D'Ath gained the seat for the Labor Party.
- On 23 May 2014, Chris Davis (Stafford) resigned. At the by-election on 19 July 2014, Anthony Lynham gained the seat for the Labor Party.

== Retiring MPs ==
The following Members of Parliament stood down at the election:

=== Labor ===
- Julie Attwood (Mount Ommaney) – announced 16 January 2012
- Desley Boyle (Cairns) – announced 17 February 2011
- Paul Lucas (Lytton) – announced 15 September 2011
- Carolyn Male (Pine Rivers) – announced 3 February 2012
- John Mickel (Logan) – announced 10 August 2011
- Lindy Nelson-Carr (Mundingburra) – announced 28 March 2011
- Neil Roberts (Nudgee) – announced 12 December 2011
- Stephen Robertson (Stretton) – announced 27 March 2011
- Robert Schwarten (Rockhampton) – announced 17 February 2011
- Judy Spence (Sunnybank) – announced 15 December 2010

=== LNP ===
- Mike Horan (Toowoomba South) – announced 26 March 2011

=== Independent ===
- Dorothy Pratt (Nanango) – announced 15 April 2011

== Polling ==
Newspoll and Galaxy polling was conducted via random telephone number selection in city and country areas. Sampling sizes usually consist of around 800-1000 electors, with the declared margin of error at around ±3 percent.

=== Graphical summary ===
View source data.
Graphical summary of primary voting opinion polls for the 2012 Queensland state election.
View source data.
Graphical summary of two-party preferred voting opinion polls for the 2012 Queensland state election.

Legislative Assembly polling
	Primary vote				TPP vote
	ALP	LNP	GRN	OTH	ALP	LNP
2012 election	26.7%	49.7%	7.5%	16.1%	37.2%	62.8%
20–22 March 2012	28%	50%	6%	16%	39.2%	60.8%
3–15 February 2012	30%	47%	9%	14%	42%	58%
Oct–Dec 2011	31%	44%	10%	15%	44%	56%
Jul–Sep 2011	27%	50%	8%	15%	39%	61%
Apr–May 2011	31%	51%	7%	11%	40%	60%
Jan–Mar 2011	38%	37%	10%	15%	52%	48%
Oct–Dec 2010	26%	45%	13%	16%	41%	59%
Jul–Sep 2010	29%	44%	14%	13%	43%	57%
2009 election	42.3%	41.6%	8.4%	7.8%	50.9%	49.1%
18–19 March 2009	42%	42%	7%	9%	49.9%	50.1%
Polling conducted by Newspoll and published in The Australian.

==== Better Premier and leadership approval graphical summary ====
View source data.
Graphical summary of Better Premier opinion polling for the 2012 Queensland state election.
View source data.
Graphical summary of Anna Bligh's approval ratings as Premier.

Better Premier polling^
	Bligh	Newman
	ALP	LNP
20–22 March 2012	36%	51%
3–15 February 2012	40%	44%
Oct–Dec 2011	39%	43%
Jul–Sep 2011	34%	48%
Apr–May 2011	35%	49%
Jan–Mar 2011	53%	26%^{2}
Oct–Dec 2010	31%	41%^{2}
Jul–Sep 2010	34%	42%^{2}
2009 election	–	–
18–19 March 2009	53%	33%^{1}
Polling conducted by Newspoll and published in The Australian.^ Remainder were "uncommitted" to either leader.^{1} Lawrence Springborg.^{2} John-Paul Langbroek.

Satisfaction polling^
	Bligh		Newman
	ALP		LNP
	Satisfied	Dissatisfied	Satisfied	Dissatisfied
20–22 March 2012	36%	58%	47%	40%
3–15 February 2012	41%	50%	45%	37%
Oct–Dec 2011	39%	50%	45%	33%
Jul–Sep 2011	38%	52%	51%	27%
Apr–May 2011	40%	50%	50%	22%
Jan–Mar 2011	49%	43%	33%^{2}	40%^{2}
Oct–Dec 2010	24%	67%	38%^{2}	38%^{2}
Jul–Sep 2010	26%	65%	32%^{2}	42%^{2}
2009 election	–	–	–	–
18–19 March 2009	46%	44%	39%^{1}	49%^{1}
Polling conducted by Newspoll and published in The Australian.^Remainder were "uncommitted" to either leader.^{1} Lawrence Springborg.^{2} John-Paul Langbroek.

== Newspaper endorsements ==
Newspaper	Endorsement
The Australian	Liberal National
The Courier-Mail	Liberal National

== See also ==
- Candidates of the 2012 Queensland state election
- Politics of Queensland
