= Opposition (Queensland) =

Parties not supporting the government in the Queensland legislature

The Opposition in the Australian state of Queensland comprises the largest party or coalition of parties not in Government. The Opposition's purpose is to hold the Government to account and constitute a "Government-in-waiting" should the existing Government fall. To that end, a Leader of the Opposition and Shadow Ministers for the various government departments question the Premier and Ministers on Government policy and administration, and formulate the policy the Opposition would pursue in Government. It is sometimes styled "His Majesty's Loyal Opposition" to demonstrate that although it opposes the Government, it remains loyal to the King.

At times, the Opposition consisted of more than one party, notably when the Coalition parties (the state Nationals and Liberals) were in Opposition. Those state parties entered Opposition in 1998 and merged to form the Liberal National Party of Queensland (LNP) in 2008, National Leader Lawrence Springborg becoming Leader of the LNP and remaining Leader of the Opposition.

== Current arrangement ==
Since 8 November 2024, the opposition is currently led by Steven Miles of the Queensland Labor Party following the 2024 Queensland state election.

Portrait	Minister	Portfolio	Took office	Left office	Duration of tenure	Party	Electorate
Shadow Cabinet Members
	Steven Miles	Leader of the Opposition; Leader of the Queensland Labor Party	28 October 2024	incumbent	205 days	Labor	Murrumba
	Cameron Dick	Deputy Leader of the Opposition; Shadow Minister for State Development, Infrastructure, Planning and Regional Development; Deputy Leader of the Queensland Labor Party	28 October 2024	incumbent	205 days	Labor	Woodridge
	Shannon Fentiman	Shadow Treasurer; Shadow Minister for Women	8 November 2024	incumbent	194 days	Labor	Waterford
	Grace Grace	Shadow Minister for Trade; Shadow Minister for Industrial Relations; Shadow Minister for Olympic and Paralympic Games; Shadow Minister for Racing	8 November 2024	incumbent	194 days	Labor	McConnel
	Meaghan Scanlon	Shadow Attorney-General; Shadow Minister for Justice; Shadow Minister for Housing, Homelessness and Home Ownership	8 November 2024	incumbent	194 days	Labor	Gaven
	Charis Mullen	Shadow Minister for Public Works; Shadow Minister for Multicultural Affairs	8 November 2024	incumbent	194 days	Labor	Jordan
	Di Farmer	Shadow Minister for Education and the Early Years; Shadow Minister for Youth Justice	8 November 2024	incumbent	194 days	Labor	Bulimba
	Mark Bailey	Shadow Minister for Health and Ambulance Services; Shadow Minister for Mental Health	8 November 2024	incumbent	194 days	Labor	Miller
	Glenn Butcher	Shadow Minister for Police and Crime Prevention; Shadow Minister for Corrective Services; Shadow Minister for Sport	8 November 2024	incumbent	194 days	Labor	Gladstone
	Bart Mellish	Shadow Minister for Transport and Main Roads; Shadow Minister for Veterans	8 November 2024	incumbent	194 days	Labor	Aspley
	Leeanne Enoch	Shadow Minister for Closing the Gap; Shadow Minister for Reconciliation; Shadow Minister for Seniors and Disability Services; Shadow Minister for Integrity; Shadow Minister for the Arts	8 November 2024	incumbent	194 days	Labor	Algester
	Leanne Linard	Shadow Minister for Environment, Science, Innovation and Climate Change; Shadow Minister for Youth	8 November 2024	incumbent	194 days	Labor	Nudgee
	Nikki Boyd	Shadow Minister for Local Government and Water; Shadow Minister for Fire, Disaster Recovery, Emergency Services and Volunteers	8 November 2024	incumbent	194 days	Labor	Pine Rivers
	Lance McCallum	Shadow Minister for Energy	8 November 2024	incumbent	194 days	Labor	Bundamba
	Michael Healy	Shadow Minister for Tourism; Shadow Minister for Jobs and Training	8 November 2024	incumbent	194 days	Labor	Cairns
	Tom Smith	Shadow Minister for Primary Industries and Rural Development; Shadow Minister for Manufacturing	8 November 2024	incumbent	194 days	Labor	Bundaberg
	Linus Power	Shadow Minister for Natural Resources and Mines	8 November 2024	incumbent	194 days	Labor	Logan
	Corrine McMillan	Shadow Minister for Child Safety, Communities and the Prevention of Domestic and Family Violence	8 November 2024	incumbent	194 days	Labor	Mansfield
	Joan Pease	Shadow Minister for Small Business; Shadow Minister for Customer Service and Open Data	8 November 2024	incumbent	194 days	Labor	Lytton
	Mick de Brenni	Manager of Opposition Business; Shadow Cabinet Secretary	8 November 2024	incumbent	194 days	Labor	Springwood

== See also ==
- Opposition (Australia)
- Deputy Leader of the Opposition
