= Carolyn Male =

Australian politician

Queensland Government Chief Whip
- In office 11 September 2006 – 3 April 2009
- Premier: Peter Beattie; Anna Bligh
- Preceded by: Terry Sullivan
- Succeeded by: Margaret Keech

Member of the Queensland Legislative Assembly for Pine Rivers
- In office 21 March 2009 – 24 March 2012
- Preceded by: Seat created
- Succeeded by: Seath Holswich

Member of the Queensland Legislative Assembly for Glass House
- In office 17 February 2001 – 21 March 2009
- Preceded by: Seat created
- Succeeded by: Andrew Powell

Personal details
- Born: 7 May 1966 (age 59) Nambour, Queensland, Australia
- Party: Labor
- Spouse: Bill Ferguson
- Occupation: School teacher, Assistant accountant

Carolyn Therese Male (born 7 May 1966) is an Australian politician who was a Labor member of the Legislative Assembly of Queensland from 2001 to 2012.

Male was first elected to parliament as the Labor member for Glass House at the 2001 state election. She served three terms as the member for Glass House, but a redistribution ahead of the 2009 state election made the district much less favourable for Labor. Consequently, she successfully contested the seat of Pine Rivers to win a fourth term.

She was Government Whip from 11 September 2006 to 8 April 2009. Male was the Parliamentary Secretary for Education from March 2009 until she was made a Deputy Government Whip in February 2012. Male retired before the 2012 election. Male was born in Nambour. She is married and has two children, Jordan and Jetta.

Parliament of Queensland
New seat	Member for Glass House; 2001–2009	Succeeded by Andrew Powell
New seat	Member for Pine Rivers; 2009–2012	Succeeded by Seath Holswich
