= Tom Barton (politician) =

Australian politician (1949–2023)

Member of the Queensland Legislative Assembly for Waterford
- In office 19 September 1992 – 9 September 2006
- Preceded by: New seat
- Succeeded by: Evan Moorhead

Personal details
- Born: Thomas Alfred Barton; 11 August 1949 Ayr, Queensland, Australia
- Died: 24 August 2023 (aged 74)
- Party: Labor
- Occupation: General Secretary, Trades and Labor Council of Queensland, Fitter

Thomas Alfred Barton (11 August 1949 – 24 August 2023) was an Australian politician who served in the Legislative Assembly of Queensland from 1992 to 2006, representing the electorate of Waterford.

== Life and career ==
Thomas Alfred Barton was born in Ayr, Queensland on 11 August 1949. He was a qualified tradesman who enjoyed motor racing and rugby league.

Barton served as |Minister for Environment & Heritage under the Goss government from 1995 to 1996. He also held various roles in the Beattie government, including Minister for Police and Corrective Services (1998–2001), Minister for State Development (2001–2004) and Minister for Employment, Training and Industrial Relations (2004–2006).

Additionally, Barton was a member of the ACTU Wages Committee from 1984 to 1992 and a founding director of Sunsuper, Queensland largest superannuation fund.

Barton died on 24 August 2023, at the age of 74.

Parliament of Queensland
New seat	Member for Waterford; 1992–2006	Succeeded by Evan Moorhead
