= Paul Hoolihan =

Australian politician

Member of the Queensland Legislative Assembly for Keppel
- In office 7 February 2004 – 23 March 2012
- Preceded by: Vince Lester
- Succeeded by: Bruce Young

Personal details
- Born: Paul Anthony Hoolihan; 8 May 1947 (age 78) Longreach, Queensland, Australia
- Party: Labor
- Occupation: Solicitor

Paul Anthony Hoolihan (born 8 May 1947) is an Australian former politician who represented the seat of Keppel in the Legislative Assembly of Queensland as a member of the Labor Party from 2004 to 2012. He was an unsuccessful candidate at the 1997 Australian Constitutional Convention election, running as an ungrouped candidate on the "Australian Republican Movement (Central Queensland)" ticket.

Parliament of Queensland
Preceded by Vince Lester	Member for Keppel; 2004–2012	Succeeded by Bruce Young
