= Linus Power =

Australian politician in Queensland

Linus Power MP

Member of the Legislative Assembly for Logan
- Incumbent
- Assumed office 31 January 2015
- Preceded by: Michael Pucci

Shadow Minister for Natural Resources and Mines
- Incumbent
- Assumed office 8 November 2024
- Preceded by: Dale Last

Personal details
- Born: 11 October 1972 (age 53) Brisbane, Queensland, Australia
- Party: Labor (since 1992)
- Spouse: Jacki Power
- Children: 3
- Education: Griffith University (BA); Harvard University (MPA)
- Occupation: Teacher; Politician
- Website: www.linuspowermp.com

Linus Patrick Power (born 11 October 1972) is an Australian politician currently serving as the member for Logan in the Legislative Assembly of Queensland.

== Early life and education ==
Power went to school at Clairvaux MacKillop College, then pursued higher education at Griffith University where he obtained a Bachelor Degree and later a Grad Dip in Education. He also holds a master's degree in Public Administration from Harvard University. Prior to entering politics, Power was a high school teacher of History, English and Japanese.

== Political career ==
Being an MP for Logan, the former seat of Queensland Labor Premier Wayne Goss, Power cited Goss' 1992 re-election campaign for prompting him to join the party. Power was elected to the Queensland Parliament at the 2015 state election. He was re-elected in 2017, 2020 and 2024. Power has served on various parliamentary committees since being elected.

Parliament of Queensland
Preceded by Michael Pucci	Member for Logan; 2015–present	Incumbent
