= Michael Pucci =

American-Australian politician

Member of the Legislative Assembly of Queensland for Logan
- In office 24 March 2012 – 31 January 2015
- Preceded by: John Mickel
- Succeeded by: Linus Power

Personal details
- Born: 1 June 1963 (age 63) Kenosha, Wisconsin, United States
- Party: One Nation (2017–2019); Liberal National (2012–2017)
- Education: Coastal Carolina Community College
- Alma mater: Saint Leo University

Military service
- Allegiance: United States
- Branch/service: United States Marine Corps
- Years of service: 1981–2001
- Rank: Gunnery Sergeant

Michael Joseph Pucci (born 1 June 1963) is a former American–Australian politician who served in the Legislative Assembly of Queensland from 2012 to 2015, representing the seat of Logan. He was born in the United States, and served in the United States Marine Corps for 20 years before immigrating to Australia. Pucci represented the Liberal National Party while in parliament, but in 2017 began working for One Nation as its campaign director for the next state election.

== Early life and education ==
Michael Joseph Pucci was born on 1 June 1963 in Kenosha, Wisconsin, United States.

Pucci studied at Coastal Carolina Community College in North Carolina and St. Leo's College of Florida and also graduated from various college courses in the Marine Corps.

== Military service ==
Pucci served twenty years' active service in the United States Marine Corps and is a veteran of the Gulf War. Whilst in the USMC, Michael achieved the rank of Gunnery Sergeant.

His Decorations include three Navy and Marine Corps Commendation Medals, three Navy and Marine Corps Achievement Medals, six Good Conduct Medals, National Defense Service Medal, and the Southwest Asia Service Medal. He achieved three stars for service in three campaigns and the Kuwait Liberation Medal from Saudi Arabia, Kuwait Liberation Medal from the Emirate of Kuwait.

== Politics ==
After moving to Australia some years prior, Pucci was elected to the seat of Logan at the 2012 Queensland state election. He was appointed to the Parliamentary Education and Innovation Committee on entering parliament, and then in February 2013 was promoted to sit on the Parliamentary Ethics Committee. On 27 November 2013 Pucci was further appointed to the Parliamentary Crime and Misconduct Committee.

He lost his seat to Labor's Linus Power at the 2015 election.

On 30 January 2017 Pucci was head-hunted and hired by One Nation as state campaign director. Pucci told The Courier-Mail he believed One Nation wanted to look after the best interests of Queenslanders.

== Personal life ==
Pucci met his wife during a posting to Brisbane, Queensland. He emigrated to Australia after retiring from the US Marine Corps and became an Australian citizen. He has four children.

Prior to entering politics, Pucci worked as an executive manager in the facilities maintenance industry, loss prevention/assets protection officer, bartender, janitor, dealership lot attendant, and paperboy.

Pucci has been an active member of the Greenbank RSL, Australian American Association and the Building Services Contractors Association.

Parliament of Queensland
Preceded by John Mickel	Member for Logan; 2012–2015	Succeeded by Linus Power
