= Seath Holswich =

Australian politician

Assistant Minister for Natural Resources and Mines
- In office 28 May 2014 – 30 January 2015
- Minister: Andrew Cripps
- Premier: Campbell Newman
- Preceded by: Lisa France

Member of the Queensland Legislative Assembly for Pine Rivers
- In office 24 March 2012 – 31 January 2015
- Preceded by: Carolyn Male
- Succeeded by: Nikki Boyd

Personal details
- Born: 6 June 1977 (age 49) South Brisbane, Queensland
- Party: Liberal National (until 2016); Family First (2016); Independent (since 2017)

Seath Andrew Holswich (born 6 June 1977) is a former Australian politician. He was a Liberal National Party member of the Legislative Assembly of Queensland for Pine Rivers from 2012 to 2015. He served as Assistant Minister for Natural Resources and Mines from May 2014 to January 2015.

Following his parliamentary defeat after one term, he joined the Family First Party where he undertook the role of Queensland Campaign Manager for the 2016 federal election. He resigned his membership of Family First shortly after the election.

In 2017 he ran as an independent candidate for Pine Rivers at the Queensland state election.

== Electoral History ==
Queensland Legislative Assembly
| Election year | Electorate | Party | Votes | FP% | +/- | 2PP% | +/- | Result |
|---|---|---|---|---|---|---|---|---|
| 2012 | Pine Rivers | LNP | 14,590 | 52.93 | ▲13.41 | 63.66 | ▲18.27 | First |
| 2015 | Pine Rivers | LNP | 11,820 | 38.84 | ▼14.10 | 42.32 | ▼21.34 | Second |
| 2017 | Pine Rivers | Ind | 2,545 | 7.80 | ▲7.80 | N/A | N/A | Fifth |

Parliament of Queensland
| Preceded by Carolyn Male | Member for Pine Rivers; 2012–2015 | Succeeded by Nikki Boyd |
