= Kerry Millard =

Australian politician (born 1972)

Kerry Millard MP
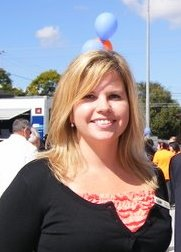
- Millard with Campbell Newman in 2010.

Member of the Legislative Assembly of Queensland for Sandgate
- In office 24 March 2012 – 30 January 2015
- Preceded by: Vicky Darling
- Succeeded by: Stirling Hinchliffe

Personal details
- Born: Kerry Natasha Millard; 26 October 1972 (age 53)
- Party: Liberal National
- Parents: Brian Edward Millard; Jose Monica Kent
- Education: Camira State School; Texas State School; Wavell State High school

Kerry Natasha Millard (born 26 October 1972) is an Australian former Liberal National politician who was the member of the Legislative Assembly of Queensland for Sandgate from 2012 to 2015.

Millard worked in the metals industry for nearly 20 years before entering politics. Having worked for a number of merchants who specialised in Stainless Steel, High Nickel Alloys, and Aluminium, Millard held positions such as Account Manager, Brisbane Manager, and Assistant State Manager – a rare achievement for a woman at that time.

During Millard's time in politics, she was on the sought-after committee of the Deputy Premier – State Development, Industry, and Infrastructure. Other committees Millard was hand picked to be part of were: The Malone Review; and, the DV Taskforce.

After politics, Millard studied and completed a Bachelor of Science, majoring in ecology, and also completed an Honours degree in the Genetic sciences.

Parliament of Queensland
Preceded by Vicky Darling	Member for Sandgate; 2012–2015	Succeeded by Stirling Hinchliffe
