= Bruce Young (politician) =

Australian politician

Member of the Queensland Legislative Assembly for Keppel
- In office 24 March 2012 – 31 January 2015
- Preceded by: Paul Hoolihan
- Succeeded by: Brittany Lauga

Personal details
- Party: Liberal National Party of Queensland
- Profession: Grazier, diesel fitter, manager

Bruce Cameron Young is an Australian Liberal National politician who was the member of the Legislative Assembly of Queensland for Keppel from 2012 to 2015.

Parliament of Queensland
Preceded by Paul Hoolihan	Member for Keppel; 2012–2015	Succeeded by Brittany Lauga
