= Evan Moorhead =

Australian politician

Secretary of the Queensland Labor Party
- In office 12 November 2014 – 29 January 2018
- Leader: Annastacia Palaszczuk
- Preceded by: Anthony Chisholm
- Succeeded by: Julie-Ann Campbell

Member of the Queensland Legislative Assembly for Waterford
- In office 9 September 2006 – 24 March 2012
- Preceded by: Tom Barton
- Succeeded by: Mike Latter

Personal details
- Born: Evan Robert Moorhead; 19 April 1978 (age 48) Redcliffe, Queensland, Australia
- Party: Labor
- Education: University of Queensland
- Occupation: Research officer

Evan Robert Moorhead (born 19 April 1978) is an Australian political strategist and former politician who served as a member of Queensland Parliament and subsequently as the Secretary of the Labor Party in Queensland.

Born in Redcliffe, he received a Bachelor of Arts and a Bachelor of Laws at the University of Queensland before becoming a research officer for the Australian Manufacturing Workers Union. A long-time member of the Australian Labor Party, he has been a delegate to the Young Labor State Conference and the National Conference.

On 9 September 2006, he was elected to the Legislative Assembly of Queensland as the member for the seat of Waterford, succeeding Tom Barton, the first Member for Waterford. Moorhead was re-elected on 21 March 2009, but lost his seat on 24 March 2012.

Moorhead held the position of ALP Assistant State Secretary from 2012 when former office holder Jackie Trad entered Parliament.

He became the ALP State Secretary in 2014 following the resignation of Anthony Chisholm.

Parliament of Queensland
Preceded by Tom Barton	Member for Waterford; 2006–2012	Succeeded by Mike Latter
