= Mike Latter =

Australian politician

Member of the Queensland Legislative Assembly for Waterford
- In office 24 March 2012 – 31 January 2015
- Preceded by: Evan Moorhead
- Succeeded by: Shannon Fentiman

Personal details
- Born: Michael Ross Latter; 5 June 1982 (age 43) Brisbane, Queensland, Australia
- Party: Liberal National Party (2012-2015); Independent (2015-present)
- Occupation: Project Manager, Paralegal

Michael Ross Latter (born 5 June 1982) is an Australian politician who was the Liberal National Party of Queensland member for Waterford from 2012 to 2015.

Parliament of Queensland
Preceded by Evan Moorhead	Member for Waterford; 2012–2015	Succeeded by Shannon Fentiman
