= Electoral district of Waterford =

State electoral district of Queensland, Australia

Waterford Queensland—Legislative Assembly
- Electoral map of Waterford 2017
- State: Queensland
- MP: Shannon Fentiman
- Party: Labor
- Namesake: Waterford
- Electors: 34,157 (2020)
- Area: 56 km^{2} (21.6 sq mi)
- Demographic: Outer-metropolitan
- Coordinates: 27°41′S 153°9′E
Electorates around Waterford:
Stretton	Toohey	Mansfield
Woodridge	Waterford	Springwood
Logan	Logan	Macalister

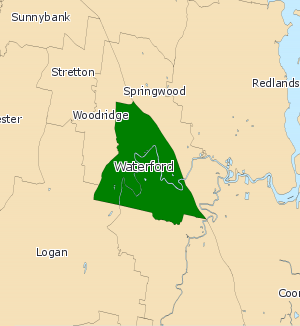
Electoral map of Waterford 2008

Waterford is an electoral district of the Legislative Assembly in the Australian state of Queensland.

The district is based in the central urban suburbs of Logan City. It is named for the suburb of Waterford and also includes the suburbs of Bethania, Edens Landing, Kingston, Holmview, Loganholme, Loganlea, Meadowbrook, Slacks Creek, Tanah Merah and Waterford West. The electorate was first created for the 1992 election.

== Members for Waterford ==
Member	Party	Term
Tom Barton	Labor	1992–2006
Evan Moorhead	Labor	2006–2012
Mike Latter	Liberal National	2012–2015
Shannon Fentiman	Labor	2015–present

== Election results ==
2024 Queensland state election: Waterford
Party	Candidate	Votes	%	±%
Labor	Shannon Fentiman	14,621	47.1	−7.4
Liberal National	Jacob Heremaia	8,733	28.1	+2.7
Greens	Kirsty Petersen	2,784	9.0	+2.0
One Nation	Callum Whatmore	2,099	6.8	−2.3
Legalise Cannabis	Julius Taylor	1,509	4.9	+4.9
Family First	Karen Cloherty	1,277	4.1	+4.1
Total formal votes		31,023	94.7	
Informal votes		1,743	5.3	
Turnout		32,766		
Two-party-preferred result
Labor	Shannon Fentiman	19,002	61.3	−4.8
Liberal National	Jacob Heremaia	12,021	38.7	+4.8
Labor hold		Swing	-4.8	
