= Results of the 2020 Queensland state election =

This is a list of election results for the 2020 Queensland state election.

== Results summary ==
Legislative Assembly (IRV) – Turnout 87.9% (CV) Result of the 2020 state general election
Party	Votes	%	Swing	Seats	+/–
Labor	1,134,969	39.57	+4.14	52	▲4
Liberal National	1,029,442	35.89	+2.20	34	▼5
Greens	271,514	9.47	−0.53	2	▲1
One Nation	204,316	7.12	−6.60	1	Steady
Katter's Australian	72,168	2.52	+0.20	3	Steady
Legalise Cannabis	26,146	0.91	+0.91	0	Steady
United Australia	17,904	0.62	+0.62	0	Steady
Informed Medical Options	17,546	0.61	+0.61	0	Steady
Animal Justice	9,703	0.34	+0.34	0	Steady
North Queensland First	5,616	0.20	+0.20	0	Steady
Civil Liberties and Motorists	5,207	0.18	−0.08 (Note: Compared to 2017 election total of Consumer Rights, which was renamed to Civil Liberties and Motorists at the 2020 election.)	0	Steady
Shooters, Fishers, Farmers	2,801	0.10	+0.10	0	Steady
Independents	70,992	2.48	−2.10	1	Steady
Formal votes	2,868,324	96.60	+0.94		
Informal votes	101,023	3.40	−0.94		
Total	2,969,347				
Registered voters / turnout	3,377,476	87.92	+0.39		
Two-party-preferred vote
Labor	1,524,766	53.2	▲1.9		
Liberal National	1,343,558	46.8	▼1.9		

== Results by electoral district ==
=== Algester ===
2020 Queensland state election: Algester
Party	Candidate	Votes	%	±%
Labor	Leeanne Enoch	17,452	58.92	+7.00
Liberal National	Nerissa Aitken	7,505	25.34	+3.65
Greens	Josie Mira	2,514	8.49	+0.29
One Nation	Wayne Stacey	2,147	7.25	−10.95
Total formal votes		29,618	96.29	+1.53
Informal votes		1,142	3.71	−1.53
Turnout		30,760	87.62	+0.47
Two-party-preferred result
Labor	Leeanne Enoch	20,073	67.77	+3.35
Liberal National	Nerissa Aitken	9,545	32.23	−3.35
Labor hold		Swing	+3.35	

=== Aspley ===
2020 Queensland state election: Aspley
Party	Candidate	Votes	%	±%
Labor	Bart Mellish	15,261	45.51	+8.00
Liberal National	Amanda Cooper	13,579	40.50	+0.77
Greens	James Hansen	2,997	8.94	−0.52
One Nation	Walter Hardy	1,141	3.40	−6.19
Civil Liberties & Motorists	Neil Skilbeck	305	0.91	−0.52
United Australia	Joshua Morrison	247	0.74	+0.74
Total formal votes		33,530	97.92	+1.75
Informal votes		711	2.08	−1.75
Turnout		34,241	90.60	+0.06
Two-party-preferred result
Labor	Bart Mellish	18,494	55.16	+3.99
Liberal National	Amanda Cooper	15,036	44.84	−3.99
Labor hold		Swing	+3.99	

=== Bancroft ===
2020 Queensland state election: Bancroft
Party	Candidate	Votes	%	±%
Labor	Chris Whiting	16,301	53.60	+10.63
Liberal National	Phil Carlson	8,626	28.36	+1.60
One Nation	Nik Aai Reddy	2,666	8.77	−10.30
Greens	Ell-Leigh Ackerman	1,820	5.98	−0.23
Independent	Barry Grant	1,001	3.29	−1.71
Total formal votes		30,414	96.76	+1.03
Informal votes		1,017	3.24	−1.03
Turnout		31,431	86.20	−1.27
Two-party-preferred result
Labor	Chris Whiting	19,100	62.80	+6.59
Liberal National	Phil Carlson	11,314	37.20	−6.59
Labor hold		Swing	+6.59	

=== Barron River ===
2020 Queensland state election: Barron River
Party	Candidate	Votes	%	±%
Labor	Craig Crawford	12,385	39.46	+5.98
Liberal National	Linda Cooper	12,092	38.53	+7.90
Greens	Aaron McDonald	4,134	13.17	+0.65
One Nation	Susan Andrews	1,852	5.90	−10.88
Informed Medical Options	Adam Rowe	575	1.83	+1.83
United Australia	Jenny Brown	345	1.10	+1.10
Total formal votes		31,383	96.74	+1.38
Informal votes		1,059	3.26	−1.38
Turnout		32,442	86.53	+2.58
Two-party-preferred result
Labor	Craig Crawford	16,653	53.06	+1.20
Liberal National	Linda Cooper	14,730	46.94	−1.20
Labor hold		Swing	+1.20	

=== Bonney ===
2020 Queensland state election: Bonney
Party	Candidate	Votes	%	±%
Liberal National	Sam O'Connor	15,323	53.26	+9.39
Labor	Ash Borg	9,226	32.07	−3.62
Greens	Amin Javanmard	2,229	7.75	−2.02
One Nation	Michael Rix	1,113	3.87	+3.87
Independent	Leana Marquet	498	1.73	+1.73
United Australia	David Bark	381	1.32	+1.32
Total formal votes		28,770	96.27	+2.18
Informal votes		1,115	3.73	−2.18
Turnout		29,885	84.10	+0.95
Two-party-preferred result
Liberal National	Sam O'Connor	17,283	60.07	+8.38
Labor	Ash Borg	11,487	39.93	−8.38
Liberal National hold		Swing	+8.38	

=== Broadwater ===
2020 Queensland state election: Broadwater
Party	Candidate	Votes	%	±%
Liberal National	David Crisafulli	18,059	59.59	+11.11
Labor	Maureen Simpson	8,041	26.53	+3.27
One Nation	Jesse Schneider	1,796	5.93	−15.48
Greens	April Broadbent	1,583	5.22	−1.63
United Australia	Mara Krischker	441	1.46	+1.46
Informed Medical Options	Natalie O'Donnell	386	1.27	+1.27
Total formal votes		30,306	96.79	+0.59
Informal votes		1,004	3.21	−0.59
Turnout		31,310	89.15	+2.78
Two-party-preferred result
Liberal National	David Crisafulli	20,174	66.57	−1.41
Labor	Maureen Simpson	10,132	33.43	+1.41
Liberal National hold		Swing	−1.41	

=== Buderim ===
2020 Queensland state election: Buderim
Party	Candidate	Votes	%	±%
Liberal National	Brent Mickelberg	13,443	42.52	+5.65
Labor	Ken Mackenzie	8,932	28.25	+5.82
Greens	Deborah Moseley	3,422	10.82	−1.30
Independent	Steve Dickson	2,234	7.07	+7.07
One Nation	Joyce Hosking	1,477	4.67	−23.89
Independent	Michael Andrews	741	2.34	+2.34
Informed Medical Options	Alina Lee	601	1.90	+1.90
Independent	Alison Barry-Jones	572	1.81	+1.81
United Australia	Daniel Philp	191	0.60	+0.60
Total formal votes		31,613	96.07	−0.37
Informal votes		1,293	3.93	+0.37
Turnout		32,906	89.13	+1.03
Two-party-preferred result
Liberal National	Brent Mickelberg	17,478	55.29	−6.12
Labor	Ken Mackenzie	14,135	44.71	+6.12
Liberal National hold		Swing	−6.12	

=== Bulimba ===
2020 Queensland state election: Bulimba
Party	Candidate	Votes	%	±%
Labor	Di Farmer	16,764	48.23	−0.64
Liberal National	Anthony Bishop	11,883	34.19	−0.35
Greens	Rolf Kuelsen	4,665	13.42	+0.30
One Nation	Doug Conway	785	2.26	+2.26
Independent	Finn Armstrong-Schmakeit	659	1.90	+1.90
Total formal votes		34,756	98.10	+1.53
Informal votes		673	1.90	−1.53
Turnout		35,429	89.53	+1.70
Two-party-preferred result
Labor	Di Farmer	21,336	61.39	+0.61
Liberal National	Anthony Bishop	13,420	38.61	−0.61
Labor hold		Swing	+0.61	

=== Bundaberg ===
2020 Queensland state election: Bundaberg
Party	Candidate	Votes	%	±%
Labor	Tom Smith	13,053	43.12	+8.76
Liberal National	David Batt	12,577	41.55	+6.03
One Nation	Stewart Jones	1,766	5.83	−16.60
Legalise Cannabis	Ian Zunker	1,669	5.51	+5.51
Greens	Claire Ogden	964	3.18	−0.34
United Australia	Shane Smeltz	244	0.81	+0.81
Total formal votes		30,273	96.48	+1.20
Informal votes		1,105	3.52	−1.20
Turnout		31,378	88.90	−1.04
Two-party-preferred result
Labor	Tom Smith	15,141	50.01	+4.21
Liberal National	David Batt	15,132	49.99	−4.21
Labor gain from Liberal National		Swing	+4.21	

=== Bundamba ===
2020 Queensland state election: Bundamba
Party	Candidate	Votes	%	±%
Labor	Lance McCallum	17,015	55.92	+2.57
Liberal National	Rob Shearman	4,635	15.23	+0.06
One Nation	Sharon Bell	4,553	14.96	+14.96
Greens	Danielle Mutton	3,127	10.28	−0.64
Animal Justice	Angela Lowery	1,099	3.61	+3.61
Total formal votes		30,429	95.77	+4.01
Informal votes		1,344	4.23	−4.01
Turnout		31,773	83.54	−0.77
Notional two-party-preferred count (Note: Estimate two-party preferred count by Antony Green.)
Labor	Lance McCallum		71.20	−0.40
Liberal National	Rob Shearman		28.80	+0.40
Two-candidate-preferred result
Labor	Lance McCallum	21,507	70.68	−0.87
One Nation	Sharon Bell	8,922	29.32	+29.32
Labor hold				

=== Burdekin ===
2020 Queensland state election: Burdekin
Party	Candidate	Votes	%	±%
Liberal National	Dale Last	11,792	39.70	+8.01
Labor	Michael Brunker	9,425	31.73	−4.23
Katter's Australian	Sam Cox	4,212	14.18	+14.18
One Nation	Clive Remmer	2,080	7.00	−22.34
NQ First	Carolyn Moriarty	900	3.03	+3.03
Greens	Jack Smith	600	2.02	−0.99
Animal Justice	Dominique Thiriet	419	1.41	+1.41
United Australia	Benjamin Wood	274	0.92	+0.92
Total formal votes		29,702	96.71	0.00
Informal votes		1,012	3.29	+0.00
Turnout		30,714	87.96	−0.28
Two-party-preferred result
Liberal National	Dale Last	16,944	57.05	+6.25
Labor	Michael Brunker	12,758	42.95	−6.25
Liberal National hold		Swing	+6.25	

=== Burleigh ===
2020 Queensland state election: Burleigh
Party	Candidate	Votes	%	±%
Liberal National	Michael Hart	11,743	39.71	−10.02
Labor	Wayne (Rabbit) Bartholomew	10,609	35.87	+1.67
Greens	Rachel Mebberson	2,753	9.31	−6.76
One Nation	Georgie Batty	2,114	7.15	+7.15
Legalise Cannabis	Ingrid Weber	1,085	3.67	+3.67
Animal Justice	Scott Wallace	948	3.21	+3.21
United Australia	Carlo Filingeri	321	1.09	+1.09
Total formal votes		29,573	95.80	+1.36
Informal votes		1,297	4.20	−1.36
Turnout		30,870	85.50	+1.59
Two-party-preferred result
Liberal National	Michael Hart	15,143	51.21	−3.65
Labor	Wayne (Rabbit) Bartholomew	14,430	48.79	+3.65
Liberal National hold		Swing	−3.65	

=== Burnett ===
2020 Queensland state election: Burnett
Party	Candidate	Votes	%	±%
Liberal National	Stephen Bennett	15,330	48.61	+6.16
Labor	Kerri Morgan	9,686	30.71	+5.42
One Nation	Geoffrey Mansell	2,832	8.98	−17.72
Greens	Liam Johns	1,436	4.55	−1.00
Katter's Australian	Paul Hudson	1,336	4.24	+4.24
Informed Medical Options	Elizabeth Case	682	2.16	+2.16
Independent	Ric Glass	235	0.75	+0.75
Total formal votes		31,537	96.01	−0.08
Informal votes		1,311	3.99	+0.08
Turnout		32,848	91.43	+0.82
Two-party-preferred result
Liberal National	Stephen Bennett	19,172	60.79	+0.14
Labor	Kerri Morgan	12,365	39.21	−0.14
Liberal National hold		Swing	+0.14	

=== Cairns ===
2020 Queensland state election: Cairns
Party	Candidate	Votes	%	±%
Labor	Michael Healy	12,727	44.20	+13.75
Liberal National	Sam Marino	10,505	36.48	+8.78
Greens	Daniel Dench	2,829	9.82	+1.76
One Nation	Darrin Griffith	1,707	5.93	−8.71
Informed Medical Options	Sarah Baxter	724	2.51	+2.51
United Australia	David Wright	302	1.05	+1.05
Total formal votes		28,794	96.46	+0.53
Informal votes		1,056	3.54	−0.53
Turnout		29,850	81.14	+0.16
Two-party-preferred result
Labor	Michael Healy	16,006	55.59	+2.20
Liberal National	Sam Marino	12,788	44.41	−2.20
Labor hold		Swing	+2.20	

=== Callide ===
2020 Queensland state election: Callide
Party	Candidate	Votes	%	±%
Liberal National	Colin Boyce	16,608	57.20	+23.77
Labor	Gordon Earnshaw	7,463	25.71	+3.55
Independent	Adam Burling	2,444	8.42	+8.42
Independent	Loris Doessel	1,371	4.72	+4.72
Greens	Anthony Walsh	1,147	3.95	+0.54
Total formal votes		29,033	97.04	+0.67
Informal votes		887	2.96	−0.67
Turnout		29,920	88.24	−1.19
Two-party-preferred result
Liberal National	Colin Boyce	19,112	65.83	+9.71
Labor	Gordon Earnshaw	9,921	34.17	+34.17
Liberal National hold				

=== Caloundra ===
2020 Queensland state election: Caloundra
Party	Candidate	Votes	%	±%
Labor	Jason Hunt	13,406	41.31	+12.62
Liberal National	Stuart Coward	12,234	37.70	−0.35
Greens	Raelene Ellis	3,281	10.11	−0.54
One Nation	Luke Poland	2,007	6.19	−16.42
Informed Medical Options	Belinda Hart	783	2.41	+2.41
United Australia	Trevor Gray	255	0.79	+0.79
Independent	Mike Jessop	245	0.76	+0.76
Independent	Mathew Hill	238	0.73	+0.73
Total formal votes		32,449	95.59	−0.34
Informal votes		1,497	4.41	+0.34
Turnout		33,946	88.16	−0.33
Two-party-preferred result
Labor	Jason Hunt	17,040	52.51	+5.92
Liberal National	Stuart Coward	15,409	47.49	−5.92
Labor gain from Liberal National		Swing	+5.92	

=== Capalaba ===
2020 Queensland state election: Capalaba
Party	Candidate	Votes	%	±%
Labor	Don Brown	15,160	48.21	+5.36
Liberal National	Bev Walters	9,719	30.91	+5.56
Greens	Michael Metzen	2,500	7.95	−0.49
Independent	Paul Branagan	1,655	5.26	+5.26
One Nation	Neal Gilmore	1,631	5.19	−14.31
Informed Medical Options	Marilyn Winters	530	1.69	+1.69
Civil Liberties & Motorists	Peter Callil	252	0.80	+0.80
Total formal votes		31,447	96.19	+0.51
Informal votes		1,246	3.81	−0.51
Turnout		32,693	90.37	+0.10
Two-party-preferred result
Labor	Don Brown	18,807	59.81	+1.95
Liberal National	Bev Walters	12,640	40.19	−1.95
Labor hold		Swing	+1.95	

=== Chatsworth ===
2020 Queensland state election: Chatsworth
Party	Candidate	Votes	%	±%
Liberal National	Steve Minnikin	14,614	46.29	−3.54
Labor	Lisa O'Donnell	12,497	39.59	+1.56
Greens	Kathryn Fry	2,941	9.32	−2.83
One Nation	Aaron Clarke	965	3.06	+3.06
Informed Medical Options	Madonna Guy	362	1.15	+1.15
United Australia	Andrew Crook	191	0.61	+0.61
Total formal votes		31,570	97.53	+1.61
Informal votes		800	2.47	−1.61
Turnout		32,370	90.75	+0.65
Two-party-preferred result
Liberal National	Steve Minnikin	16,191	51.29	−1.62
Labor	Lisa O'Donnell	15,379	48.71	+1.62
Liberal National hold		Swing	−1.62	

=== Clayfield ===
2020 Queensland state election: Clayfield
Party	Candidate	Votes	%	±%
Liberal National	Tim Nicholls	15,979	45.89	−1.94
Labor	Philip Anthony	11,157	32.04	−0.84
Greens	Andrew Bartlett	6,132	17.61	−1.67
One Nation	Abby Douglas	817	2.35	+2.35
Independent Liberal Democrat	Robert King	478	1.37	+1.37
Civil Liberties & Motorists	Kathy Moloney	254	0.73	+0.73
Total formal votes		34,817	97.98	+1.74
Informal votes		719	2.02	−1.74
Turnout		35,536	88.36	+1.60
Two-party-preferred result
Liberal National	Tim Nicholls	17,949	51.55	−0.86
Labor	Philip Anthony	16,868	48.45	+0.86
Liberal National hold		Swing	−0.86	

=== Condamine ===
2020 Queensland state election: Condamine
Party	Candidate	Votes	%	±%
Liberal National	Pat Weir	18,466	54.66	+12.86
Labor	Brendon Huybregts	7,775	23.02	+4.98
One Nation	Greg Priebe	5,286	15.65	−8.13
Greens	Sean Womersley	1,659	4.91	−0.07
United Australia	Nui Harris	595	1.76	+1.76
Total formal votes		33,781	97.14	+0.47
Informal votes		993	2.86	−0.47
Turnout		34,774	91.79	−0.03
Two-party-preferred result
Liberal National	Pat Weir	23,376	69.20	+5.00
Labor	Brendon Huybregts	10,405	30.80	−5.00
Liberal National hold		Swing	+5.00	

=== Cook ===
2020 Queensland state election: Cook
Party	Candidate	Votes	%	±%
Labor	Cynthia Lui	10,363	40.02	−0.08
Liberal National	Ed (Nipper) Brown	6,241	24.10	+6.35
Katter's Australian	Tanika Parker	4,458	17.22	+0.24
One Nation	Brett (Beaver) Neal	1,717	6.63	−11.78
Greens	Deby Ruddell	1,306	5.04	−1.71
Independent	Yodie Batzke	1,000	3.86	+3.86
NQ First	Desmond Tayley	624	2.41	+2.41
United Australia	Stephen Goulmy	184	0.71	+0.71
Total formal votes		25,893	95.69	−0.04
Informal votes		1,167	4.31	+0.04
Turnout		27,060	79.79	−1.47
Two-party-preferred result
Labor	Cynthia Lui	14,567	56.26	−1.90
Liberal National	Ed (Nipper) Brown	11,326	43.74	+1.90
Labor hold		Swing	−1.90	

=== Coomera ===
2020 Queensland state election: Coomera
Party	Candidate	Votes	%	±%
Liberal National	Michael Crandon	14,655	39.97	+0.62
Labor	Chris Johnson	13,310	36.30	+5.06
One Nation	Tabita Wilkinson	3,051	8.32	−12.14
Greens	Lissy Gavranich	3,015	8.22	−0.72
Animal Justice	Darryl Prout	977	2.66	+2.66
United Australia	Heath Gallagher	618	1.69	+1.69
Independent	Kris Bourbon	558	1.52	+1.52
Informed Medical Options	She D'Montford	481	1.31	+1.31
Total formal votes		36,665	95.10	+0.91
Informal votes		1,888	4.90	−0.91
Turnout		38,553	84.33	+0.25
Two-party-preferred result
Liberal National	Michael Crandon	18,727	51.08	−2.40
Labor	Chris Johnson	17,938	48.92	+2.40
Liberal National hold		Swing	−2.40	

=== Cooper ===
2020 Queensland state election: Cooper
Party	Candidate	Votes	%	±%
Labor	Jonty Bush	11,509	34.10	−6.73
Liberal National	Trent Wiseman	11,285	33.44	−2.15
Greens	Katinka Winston-Allom	10,000	29.63	+9.02
One Nation	Susan Ventnor	587	1.74	+1.74
Independent	Robert Wiltshire	366	1.08	−1.88
Total formal votes		33,747	98.70	+1.14
Informal votes		443	1.30	−1.14
Turnout		34,190	91.45	+1.49
Two-party-preferred result
Labor	Jonty Bush	20,414	60.49	−0.16
Liberal National	Trent Wiseman	13,333	39.51	+0.16
Labor hold		Swing	−0.16	

=== Currumbin ===
2020 Queensland state election: Currumbin
Party	Candidate	Votes	%	±%
Liberal National	Laura Gerber	11,957	40.24	−7.45
Labor	Kaylee Campradt	10,317	34.72	−0.91
Greens	Peter Burgoyne	2,933	9.87	−1.85
Independent	Richard Stuckey	1,681	5.66	+5.66
One Nation	Glen Wadsworth	1,193	4.01	+4.01
Independent	Tracy Takacs-Thorne	1,048	3.53	+3.53
United Australia	Anna Palmer	460	1.55	+1.55
Independent	Ian Logan	127	0.43	+0.43
Total formal votes		29,716	95.34	−0.01
Informal votes		1,454	4.66	+0.01
Turnout		31,170	86.44	+1.97
Two-party-preferred result
Liberal National	Laura Gerber	15,013	50.52	−2.79
Labor	Kaylee Campradt	14,703	49.48	+2.79
Liberal National hold		Swing	−2.79	

=== Everton ===
2020 Queensland state election: Everton
Party	Candidate	Votes	%	±%
Liberal National	Tim Mander	15,455	45.79	−5.97
Labor	Danielle Shankey	12,755	37.79	+1.91
Greens	Helen Rath	3,098	9.18	−3.17
One Nation	Mal Johnson	1,051	3.11	+3.11
Legalise Cannabis	Frank Jordan	871	2.58	+2.58
Informed Medical Options	Joanne Dissanayake	264	0.78	+0.78
United Australia	Simon Russ	152	0.45	+0.45
Independent	Jabez Wells	105	0.31	+0.31
Total formal votes		33,751	97.74	+1.52
Informal votes		782	2.26	−1.52
Turnout		34,533	92.04	+0.70
Two-party-preferred result
Liberal National	Tim Mander	17,630	52.24	−2.71
Labor	Danielle Shankey	16,121	47.76	+2.71
Liberal National hold		Swing	−2.71	

=== Ferny Grove ===
2020 Queensland state election: Ferny Grove
Party	Candidate	Votes	%	±%
Labor	Mark Furner	14,577	45.10	+4.57
Liberal National	Chris Lehmann	10,714	33.14	−6.92
Greens	Joel Colls	4,910	15.19	−0.33
One Nation	Elton Williams	956	2.96	+2.96
Informed Medical Options	Susan Pini	510	1.58	+1.58
Independent	Mark Scofield	467	1.44	+1.44
United Australia	John McCabe	191	0.59	+0.59
Total formal votes		32,325	97.38	+0.43
Informal votes		870	2.62	−0.43
Turnout		33,195	91.64	+1.28
Two-party-preferred result
Labor	Mark Furner	19,710	60.97	+6.34
Liberal National	Chris Lehmann	12,615	39.03	−6.34
Labor hold		Swing	+6.34	

=== Gaven ===
2020 Queensland state election: Gaven
Party	Candidate	Votes	%	±%
Labor	Meaghan Scanlon	12,932	47.47	+4.40
Liberal National	Kirsten Jackson	9,021	33.11	−12.99
One Nation	Sharon Sewell	2,239	8.22	+8.22
Greens	Sally Spain	1,503	5.52	−5.31
Legalise Cannabis	Suzette Luyken	1,065	3.91	+3.91
United Australia	Garry Beck	292	1.07	+1.07
Civil Liberties & Motorists	Reyna Drake	192	0.70	+0.70
Total formal votes		27,244	95.05	+1.57
Informal votes		1,419	4.95	−1.57
Turnout		28,663	86.72	+0.31
Two-party-preferred result
Labor	Meaghan Scanlon	15,734	57.75	+7.04
Liberal National	Kirsten Jackson	11,510	42.25	−7.04
Labor hold		Swing	+7.04	

=== Gladstone ===
2020 Queensland state election: Gladstone
Party	Candidate	Votes	%	±%
Labor	Glenn Butcher	18,429	64.40	+0.09
Liberal National	Ron Harding	4,339	15.16	+3.60
One Nation	Kevin Jorgensen	3,677	12.85	−7.57
Independent	Murray Peterson	1,162	4.06	+4.06
Greens	Emma Eastaughffe	1,011	3.53	−0.18
Total formal votes		28,618	96.87	+0.21
Informal votes		924	3.13	−0.21
Turnout		29,542	87.95	+1.52
Two-party-preferred result
Labor	Glenn Butcher	21,030	73.49	+0.20
Liberal National	Ron Harding	7,588	26.51	−0.20
Labor hold		Swing	+0.20	

=== Glass House ===
2020 Queensland state election: Glass House
Party	Candidate	Votes	%	±%
Liberal National	Andrew Powell	12,265	40.28	+4.76
Labor	Brent Hampstead	9,753	32.03	+5.77
Greens	Andrew McLean	3,937	12.93	+0.05
One Nation	Graeme Campbell	3,134	10.29	−12.38
Informed Medical Options	Laressa McCoy	1,015	3.33	+3.33
United Australia	James McDonald	343	1.13	+1.13
Total formal votes		30,447	96.57	+0.14
Informal votes		1,083	3.43	−0.14
Turnout		31,530	90.74	+1.30
Two-party-preferred result
Liberal National	Andrew Powell	15,706	51.58	−1.84
Labor	Brent Hampstead	14,741	48.42	+1.84
Liberal National hold		Swing	−1.84	

=== Greenslopes ===
2020 Queensland state election: Greenslopes
Party	Candidate	Votes	%	±%
Labor	Joe Kelly	13,426	41.33	−1.01
Liberal National	Andrew Newbold	10,238	31.52	−4.86
Greens	Victor Huml	7,609	23.43	+2.15
One Nation	John Booker	805	2.48	+2.48
Informed Medical Options	Jasmine (Jazzy) Melhop	403	1.24	+1.24
Total formal votes		32,481	98.07	+1.59
Informal votes		640	1.93	−1.59
Turnout		33,121	88.63	+0.15
Two-party-preferred result
Labor	Joe Kelly	20,529	63.20	+3.07
Liberal National	Andrew Newbold	11,952	36.80	−3.07
Labor hold		Swing	+3.07	

=== Gregory ===
2020 Queensland state election: Gregory
Party	Candidate	Votes	%	±%
Liberal National	Lachlan Millar	11,197	54.16	+8.90
Labor	Dave Kerrigan	5,121	24.77	+3.83
One Nation	Clint Rothery	2,861	13.84	−10.38
Greens	Paul Bambrick	580	2.81	−0.25
Civil Liberties & Motorists	Bruce Currie	370	1.79	+1.79
United Australia	Thomas Turner	288	1.39	+1.39
Informed Medical Options	Tania Kiara	256	1.24	+1.24
Total formal votes		20,673	97.28	+0.51
Informal votes		577	2.72	−0.51
Turnout		21,250	85.74	−2.01
Two-party-preferred result
Liberal National	Lachlan Millar	13,902	67.25	+3.00
Labor	Dave Kerrigan	6,771	32.75	−3.00
Liberal National hold		Swing	+3.00	

=== Gympie ===
2020 Queensland state election: Gympie
Party	Candidate	Votes	%	±%
Liberal National	Tony Perrett	14,071	42.42	+5.18
Labor	Geoff Williams	9,501	28.64	+6.26
One Nation	Michael Blaxland	4,172	12.58	−17.15
Greens	Lauren Granger-Brown	2,060	6.21	+0.52
Independent	Tim Jerome	1,709	5.15	+5.15
Independent	Donna Reardon	636	1.92	−3.04
Informed Medical Options	Nicholas Fairbairn	566	1.71	+1.71
Independent	Roland Maertens	457	1.38	+1.38
Total formal votes		33,172	95.19	−0.61
Informal votes		1,676	4.81	+0.61
Turnout		34,848	89.03	−0.69
Two-party-preferred result
Liberal National	Tony Perrett	19,402	58.49	−0.20
Labor	Geoff Williams	13,770	41.51	+0.20
Liberal National hold		Swing	−0.20	

=== Hervey Bay ===
2020 Queensland state election: Hervey Bay
Party	Candidate	Votes	%	±%
Labor	Adrian Tantari	13,382	39.50	+10.45
Liberal National	Steve Coleman	11,637	34.35	−3.37
One Nation	Damian Huxham	3,773	11.14	−14.09
Independent	Stuart Taylor	3,001	8.86	+8.86
Greens	Sonja Gerdsen	1,061	3.13	−1.94
Animal Justice	Amy Byrnes	1,024	3.02	+3.02
Total formal votes		33,878	96.45	+0.49
Informal votes		1,247	3.55	−0.49
Turnout		35,125	88.64	+0.15
Two-party-preferred result
Labor	Adrian Tantari	17,625	52.02	+11.12
Liberal National	Steve Coleman	16,253	47.98	−11.12
Labor gain from Liberal National		Swing	+11.12	

=== Hill ===
2020 Queensland state election: Hill
Party	Candidate	Votes	%	±%
Katter's Australian	Shane Knuth	16,970	52.62	+4.45
Labor	Michael Hodgkins	6,354	19.70	+0.76
Liberal National	Nick Cuda	5,466	16.95	−5.87
Greens	Jennifer Cox	2,083	6.46	−0.10
Informed Medical Options	Tara Garozzo	850	2.64	+2.64
Independent	Peter Campion	414	1.28	+1.28
Independent	Chester Tuxford	114	0.35	−0.42
Total formal votes		32,251	96.47	+0.03
Informal votes		1,179	3.53	−0.03
Turnout		33,430	88.00	+0.10
Notional two-party-preferred count (Note: Estimate two-party preferred count by Antony Green.)
Liberal National	Nick Cuda		59.70	
Labor	Michael Hodgkins		40.30	
Two-candidate-preferred result
Katter's Australian	Shane Knuth	23,398	72.55	+2.80
Labor	Michael Hodgkins	8,853	27.45	+27.45
Katter's Australian hold				

=== Hinchinbrook ===
2020 Queensland state election: Hinchinbrook
Party	Candidate	Votes	%	±%
Katter's Australian	Nick Dametto	12,522	42.54	+21.59
Liberal National	Scott Piper	7,342	24.94	−5.17
Labor	Paul Jacob	5,723	19.44	+0.42
One Nation	Michael Sullivan	2,097	7.12	−14.90
Greens	Carolyn Mewing	1,010	3.43	+0.19
United Australia	Aurelio Mason	393	1.34	+1.34
Independent	Jen Sackley	351	1.19	+1.19
Total formal votes		29,438	96.55	+0.64
Informal votes		1,053	3.45	−0.64
Turnout		30,491	86.99	−1.13
Notional two-party-preferred count
Liberal National	Scott Piper		57.40	
Labor	Paul Jacob		44.10	
Two-candidate-preferred result
Katter's Australian	Nick Dametto	19,064	64.76	+7.21
Liberal National	Scott Piper	10,374	35.24	−7.21
Katter's Australian hold		Swing	+7.21	

=== Inala ===
2020 Queensland state election: Inala
Party	Candidate	Votes	%	±%
Labor	Annastacia Palaszczuk	19,888	67.42	−0.54
Liberal National	Miljenka Perovic	4,879	16.54	−4.15
Greens	Peter Murphy	2,275	7.71	−3.63
One Nation	Scott Reid	1,341	4.55	+4.55
Legalise Cannabis	Nigel Quinlan	734	2.49	+2.49
Independent	Terry Jones	197	0.67	+0.67
Civil Liberties & Motorists	Michael Vidal	183	0.62	+0.62
Total formal votes		29,497	95.10	+2.25
Informal votes		1,521	4.90	−2.25
Turnout		31,018	86.85	+0.27
Two-party-preferred result
Labor	Annastacia Palaszczuk	23,057	78.17	+2.07
Liberal National	Miljenka Perovic	6,440	21.83	−2.07
Labor hold		Swing	+2.07	

=== Ipswich ===
2020 Queensland state election: Ipswich
Party	Candidate	Votes	%	±%
Labor	Jennifer Howard	14,699	51.80	+3.82
Liberal National	Scott O'Connell	5,769	20.33	+6.43
One Nation	Suzie Holmes	3,947	13.91	−12.70
Greens	Pat Walsh	2,396	8.44	−0.24
Legalise Cannabis	Shelly Morton	1,565	5.52	+5.52
Total formal votes		28,376	96.92	+2.14
Informal votes		903	3.08	−2.14
Turnout		29,279	86.96	−1.73
Two-party-preferred result
Labor	Jennifer Howard	18,876	66.52	+2.20
Liberal National	Scott O'Connell	9,500	33.48	−2.20
Labor hold		Swing	+2.20	

=== Ipswich West ===
2020 Queensland state election: Ipswich West
Party	Candidate	Votes	%	±%
Labor	Jim Madden	15,033	50.15	+2.88
Liberal National	Chris Green	6,328	21.11	+4.57
One Nation	Gary Duffy	4,412	14.72	−13.44
Greens	Raven Wolf	1,957	6.53	−1.50
Legalise Cannabis	Anthony Hopkins	1,361	4.54	+4.54
Civil Liberties & Motorists	Clem Grieger	565	1.88	+1.88
Independent	Karakan Kochardy	321	1.07	+1.07
Total formal votes		29,977	95.99	+0.73
Informal votes		1,252	4.01	−0.73
Turnout		31,229	86.76	−2.08
Two-party-preferred result
Labor	Jim Madden	19,289	64.35	+2.70
Liberal National	Chris Green	10,688	35.65	−2.70
Labor hold		Swing	+2.70	

=== Jordan ===
2020 Queensland state election: Jordan
Party	Candidate	Votes	%	±%
Labor	Charis Mullen	18,471	55.44	+15.82
Liberal National	Andrew Mooney	7,560	22.69	+8.27
One Nation	Neil Symes	3,705	11.12	−7.76
Greens	Navdeep Singh Sidhu	3,579	10.74	+3.31
Total formal votes		33,315	96.53	+2.79
Informal votes		1,197	3.47	−2.79
Turnout		34,512	88.40	−0.64
Two-party-preferred result
Labor	Charis Mullen	22,356	67.10	+7.10
Liberal National	Andrew Mooney	10,959	32.90	−7.10
Labor hold		Swing	+7.10	

=== Kawana ===
2020 Queensland state election: Kawana
Party	Candidate	Votes	%	±%
Liberal National	Jarrod Bleijie	16,148	50.84	−5.07
Labor	Bill Redpath	9,835	30.96	+5.48
Greens	Anna Sri	2,965	9.33	−1.17
One Nation	Lynette Moussalli	1,924	6.06	+6.06
Animal Justice	Pamela Mariko	569	1.79	+1.79
United Australia	Afrikah McGladrigan	324	1.02	+1.02
Total formal votes		31,765	96.84	+1.73
Informal votes		1,038	3.16	−1.73
Turnout		32,803	89.21	+1.39
Two-party-preferred result
Liberal National	Jarrod Bleijie	18,840	59.31	−3.76
Labor	Bill Redpath	12,925	40.69	+3.76
Liberal National hold		Swing	−3.76	

=== Keppel ===
2020 Queensland state election: Keppel
Party	Candidate	Votes	%	±%
Labor	Brittany Lauga	14,969	46.22	+3.16
Liberal National	Adrian de Groot	9,576	29.57	+4.67
One Nation	Wade Rothery	5,069	15.65	−9.80
Greens	Clancy Mullbrick	1,291	3.99	−2.61
Legalise Cannabis	Jimmy Dockery	862	2.66	+2.66
Informed Medical Options	Paula Ganfield	430	1.33	+1.33
United Australia	Nikki Smeltz	192	0.59	+0.59
Total formal votes		32,389	97.08	+0.52
Informal votes		973	2.92	−0.52
Turnout		33,362	90.04	−0.58
Two-party-preferred result
Labor	Brittany Lauga	18,018	55.63	−0.10
Liberal National	Adrian de Groot	14,371	44.37	+0.10
Labor hold		Swing	−0.10	

=== Kurwongbah ===
2020 Queensland state election: Kurwongbah
Party	Candidate	Votes	%	±%
Labor	Shane King	16,243	51.79	+10.40
Liberal National	Kerry Petrus	8,460	26.98	+2.50
One Nation	Kim Attrill	2,834	9.04	−12.76
Greens	Earl Snijders	2,317	7.39	−1.12
Animal Justice	Heather Dwane	787	2.51	+2.51
Independent	Thor Prohaska	721	2.30	−1.53
Total formal votes		31,362	96.34	+0.77
Informal votes		1,192	3.66	−0.77
Turnout		32,554	88.72	−0.36
Two-party-preferred result
Labor	Shane King	19,804	63.15	+6.15
Liberal National	Kerry Petrus	11,558	36.85	−6.15
Labor hold		Swing	+6.15	

=== Lockyer ===
2020 Queensland state election: Lockyer
Party	Candidate	Votes	%	±%
Liberal National	Jim McDonald	13,662	45.15	+9.33
Labor	Janet Butler	7,477	24.71	+1.81
One Nation	Corey West	4,010	13.25	−21.13
Independent	Jim Savage	3,057	10.10	+10.10
Greens	Rebecca Haley	1,489	4.92	+0.38
United Australia	Andrew Rockliff	563	1.86	+1.86
Total formal votes		30,258	96.52	+0.42
Informal votes		1,091	3.48	−0.42
Turnout		31,349	89.73	−0.11
Two-party-preferred result
Liberal National	Jim McDonald	18,616	61.52	−0.30
Labor	Janet Butler	11,642	38.48	+0.30
Liberal National hold		Swing	−0.30	

=== Logan ===
2020 Queensland state election: Logan
Party	Candidate	Votes	%	±%
Labor	Linus Power	16,587	53.47	+11.15
Liberal National	Clinton Pattison	7,725	24.90	+6.60
One Nation	Peter Weber	4,283	13.81	−17.09
Greens	Liam Jenkinson	1,900	6.13	+1.24
United Australia	Sam Iskander	524	1.69	+1.69
Total formal votes		31,019	96.26	+1.95
Informal votes		1,205	3.74	−1.95
Turnout		32,224	85.49	−1.73
Two-party-preferred result
Labor	Linus Power	19,663	63.39	+6.10
Liberal National	Clinton Pattison	11,356	36.61	−6.10
Labor hold		Swing	+6.10	

=== Lytton ===
2020 Queensland state election: Lytton
Party	Candidate	Votes	%	±%
Labor	Joan Pease	17,067	52.21	+3.28
Liberal National	Gordon Walters	9,955	30.45	+6.13
Greens	Ken Austin	3,450	10.55	−0.79
One Nation	Debra Smith	1,289	3.94	−11.46
Informed Medical Options	Georgia Phillips	606	1.85	+1.85
United Australia	Jonathan Spaits	321	0.98	+0.98
Total formal votes		32,688	97.45	+0.69
Informal votes		856	2.55	−0.69
Turnout		33,544	89.76	−0.10
Two-party-preferred result
Labor	Joan Pease	20,708	63.35	+1.33
Liberal National	Gordon Walters	11,980	36.65	−1.33
Labor hold		Swing	+1.33	

=== Macalister ===
2020 Queensland state election: Macalister
Party	Candidate	Votes	%	±%
Labor	Melissa McMahon	12,896	44.18	+7.52
Liberal National	Judi van Manen	7,921	27.14	+0.49
Independent	Margaret Keech	3,020	10.35	+10.35
One Nation	Bronwyn Bye	2,178	7.46	+7.46
Greens	Kirsty Petersen	1,810	6.20	−0.45
Independent	Paul Taylor	714	2.45	+2.45
United Australia	David McClaer	348	1.19	+1.19
Civil Liberties & Motorists	Ben Musgrave	304	1.04	−2.25
Total formal votes		29,191	94.60	+1.21
Informal votes		1,667	5.40	−1.21
Turnout		30,858	83.60	−1.86
Two-party-preferred result
Labor	Melissa McMahon	17,381	59.54	+2.09
Liberal National	Judi van Manen	11,810	40.46	−2.09
Labor hold		Swing	+2.09	

=== McConnel ===
2020 Queensland state election: McConnel
Party	Candidate	Votes	%	±%
Labor	Grace Grace	11,616	35.30	+1.62
Liberal National	Pinky Singh	10,192	30.97	−5.55
Greens	Kirsten Lovejoy	9,263	28.15	+1.04
Legalise Cannabis	Paul Swan	721	2.19	+2.19
One Nation	Anne Perry	474	1.44	+1.44
Independent	Miranda Bertram	236	0.72	+0.72
United Australia	Malcolm Wood	164	0.50	+0.50
Informed Medical Options	Alan Hamilton	152	0.46	+0.46
Independent	John Dobinson	93	0.28	−0.75
Total formal votes		32,911	97.38	+1.33
Informal votes		885	2.62	−1.33
Turnout		33,796	85.67	+4.10
Two-party-preferred result
Labor	Grace Grace	20,096	61.06	+3.20
Liberal National	Pinky Singh	12,815	38.94	−3.20
Labor hold		Swing	+3.20	

=== Mackay ===
2020 Queensland state election: Mackay
Party	Candidate	Votes	%	±%
Labor	Julieanne Gilbert	14,632	46.47	+3.55
Liberal National	Chris Bonanno	10,061	31.95	+7.21
One Nation	Christine Keys	3,965	12.59	−10.06
Legalise Cannabis	Shaun Krstic	1,378	4.38	+4.38
Greens	Imogen Lindenberg	1,071	3.40	−1.58
Informed Medical Options	Julie Saunders	382	1.21	+1.21
Total formal votes		31,489	95.99	+0.46
Informal votes		1,314	4.01	−0.46
Turnout		32,803	85.87	−1.07
Two-party-preferred result
Labor	Julieanne Gilbert	17,862	56.72	−1.61
Liberal National	Chris Bonanno	13,627	43.28	+1.61
Labor hold		Swing	−1.61	

=== Maiwar ===
2020 Queensland state election: Maiwar
Party	Candidate	Votes	%	±%
Greens	Michael Berkman	14,254	41.32	+13.55
Liberal National	Lauren Day	12,832	37.20	−4.70
Labor	Palani Thevar	6,413	18.59	−8.94
One Nation	Boyd Shannon	476	1.38	+1.38
Independent	Michael Johnson	348	1.01	+1.01
United Australia	Jacob Rush	170	0.49	+0.49
Total formal votes		34,493	98.63	+1.04
Informal votes		478	1.37	−1.04
Turnout		34,971	90.45	+3.64
Notional two-party-preferred count (Note: Estimate two-party preferred count by Antony Green.)
Labor	Palani Thevar		54.20	
Liberal National	Lauren Day		45.80	
Two-candidate-preferred result
Greens	Michael Berkman	19,427	56.32	+4.70
Liberal National	Lauren Day	15,066	43.68	−4.70
Greens hold		Swing	+4.70	

=== Mansfield ===
2020 Queensland state election: Mansfield
Party	Candidate	Votes	%	±%
Labor	Corrine McMillan	14,256	46.14	+6.75
Liberal National	Janet Wishart	11,874	38.43	−1.77
Greens	Rob Walter	2,967	9.60	−1.70
One Nation	Christopher O'Callaghan	715	2.31	−6.80
Legalise Cannabis	Brendan Taylor	708	2.29	+2.29
Independent	Jarrod Wirth	233	0.75	+0.75
United Australia	Maria Todorova	145	0.47	+0.47
Total formal votes		30,898	97.40	+1.52
Informal votes		826	2.60	−1.52
Turnout		31,724	90.47	+1.51
Two-party-preferred result
Labor	Corrine McMillan	17,551	56.80	+5.18
Liberal National	Janet Wishart	13,347	43.20	−5.18
Labor hold		Swing	+5.18	

=== Maroochydore ===
2020 Queensland state election: Maroochydore
Party	Candidate	Votes	%	±%
Liberal National	Fiona Simpson	14,426	47.88	+3.21
Labor	Alison Smith	7,737	25.68	+0.43
Greens	Gabrielle Unverzagt	3,336	11.07	−2.81
Independent	John Connolly	1,916	6.36	+6.36
One Nation	Rod McCormack	1,247	4.14	−12.06
Animal Justice	Tash Poole	926	3.07	+3.07
United Australia	Greg Searle	248	0.82	+0.82
Independent	Janet Creevey	149	0.49	+0.49
Independent	Mark Wadeson	147	0.49	+0.49
Total formal votes		30,132	95.78	−0.48
Informal votes		1,327	4.22	+0.48
Turnout		31,459	87.34	+1.60
Two-party-preferred result
Liberal National	Fiona Simpson	17,814	59.12	+0.60
Labor	Alison Smith	12,318	40.88	−0.60
Liberal National hold		Swing	+0.60	

=== Maryborough ===
2020 Queensland state election: Maryborough
Party	Candidate	Votes	%	±%
Labor	Bruce Saunders	17,751	53.27	+8.08
Liberal National	Denis Chapman	8,763	26.30	+8.26
One Nation	Sharon Lohse	4,392	13.18	−17.18
Greens	Craig Armstrong	888	2.66	−0.84
Legalise Cannabis	River Body	885	2.66	+2.66
Informed Medical Options	Samantha Packer	452	1.36	+1.36
United Australia	Alex Sokolov	194	0.58	+0.58
Total formal votes		33,325	96.26	+0.05
Informal votes		1,293	3.74	−0.05
Turnout		34,618	90.46	+0.00
Two-party-preferred result
Labor	Bruce Saunders	20,624	61.89	+9.43
Liberal National	Denis Chapman	12,701	38.11	+38.11
Labor hold		Swing	+9.43	

=== Mermaid Beach ===
2020 Queensland state election: Mermaid Beach
Party	Candidate	Votes	%	±%
Liberal National	Ray Stevens	12,604	44.07	−1.48
Labor	Carl Ungerer	8,721	30.49	+5.74
Greens	Zai Harris	3,090	10.80	+1.13
One Nation	Stephen James	1,434	5.01	+5.01
Legalise Cannabis	Deb Lynch	1,142	3.99	+3.99
Independent	Tory Jones	506	1.77	+1.77
United Australia	Hristo Avdjiev	375	1.31	+1.31
Independent	Rhett Holt	302	1.06	+1.06
Independent	Nicholas McArthur-Williams	254	0.89	+0.89
Civil Liberties & Motorists	Suphakan (Mod) Somsriruen	174	0.61	+0.61
Total formal votes		28,602	93.86	+0.50
Informal votes		1,870	6.14	−0.50
Turnout		30,472	85.06	+1.63
Two-party-preferred result
Liberal National	Ray Stevens	15,558	54.39	−1.87
Labor	Carl Ungerer	13,044	45.61	+1.87
Liberal National hold		Swing	−1.87	

=== Miller ===
2020 Queensland state election: Miller
Party	Candidate	Votes	%	±%
Labor	Mark Bailey	13,407	41.99	+3.95
Liberal National	Paul Darwen	9,759	30.57	−6.03
Greens	Patsy O'Brien	6,590	20.64	−1.27
Legalise Cannabis	Josip Zirdum	1,004	3.14	+3.14
One Nation	Maria Packer	613	1.92	+1.92
Independent Progressives	Edward Carroll	380	1.19	+1.19
United Australia	Christian Julius	174	0.54	+0.54
Total formal votes		31,927	98.10	+0.75
Informal votes		620	1.90	−0.75
Turnout		32,547	91.41	+2.34
Two-party-preferred result
Labor	Mark Bailey	20,376	63.82	+5.64
Liberal National	Paul Darwen	11,551	36.18	−5.64
Labor hold		Swing	+5.64	

=== Mirani ===
2020 Queensland state election: Mirani
Party	Candidate	Votes	%	±%
Labor	Shane Hamilton	9,412	31.97	−4.78
One Nation	Stephen Andrew	9,320	31.66	−0.38
Liberal National	Tracie Newitt	8,123	27.59	+0.69
NQ First	Jason Borg	1,200	4.08	+4.08
Greens	Ben Watkin	715	2.43	−1.90
Civil Liberties & Motorists	Nick Byram	342	1.16	+1.16
United Australia	Tepepe Borg	329	1.12	+1.12
Total formal votes		29,441	96.25	−0.29
Informal votes		1,146	3.75	+0.29
Turnout		30,587	89.59	−1.54
Notional two-party-preferred count (Note: Estimate two-party preferred count by Antony Green.)
Liberal National	Tracie Newitt		53.20	
Labor	Shane Hamilton		46.80	
Two-candidate-preferred result
One Nation	Stephen Andrew	17,363	58.98	+4.16
Labor	Shane Hamilton	12,078	41.02	−4.16
One Nation hold		Swing	+4.16	

=== Moggill ===
2020 Queensland state election: Moggill
Party	Candidate	Votes	%	±%
Liberal National	Christian Rowan	14,888	46.89	−1.79
Labor	Roberta Albrecht	9,012	28.38	+1.88
Greens	Lawson McCane	6,536	20.58	−0.32
One Nation	Bruce Mitchell	922	2.90	+2.90
Civil Liberties & Motorists	Amy Rayward	395	1.24	−2.68
Total formal votes		31,753	98.31	+1.05
Informal votes		546	1.69	−1.05
Turnout		32,299	92.45	+1.16
Two-party-preferred result
Liberal National	Christian Rowan	17,016	53.59	−1.44
Labor	Roberta Albrecht	14,737	46.41	+1.44
Liberal National hold		Swing	−1.44	

=== Morayfield ===
2020 Queensland state election: Morayfield
Party	Candidate	Votes	%	±%
Labor	Mark Ryan	16,386	54.38	+8.62
Liberal National	Theresa Craig	6,549	21.73	+1.67
One Nation	Rodney Hansen	3,582	11.89	−13.34
Greens	Amy Smith	2,393	7.94	+1.91
Independent	Jason Snow	631	2.09	+2.09
Informed Medical Options	Grant Matthews	594	1.97	+1.97
Total formal votes		30,135	95.47	−0.07
Informal votes		1,429	4.53	+0.07
Turnout		31,564	85.33	−1.24
Two-party-preferred result
Labor	Mark Ryan	20,109	66.73	+7.40
Liberal National	Theresa Craig	10,026	33.27	−7.40
Labor hold		Swing	+7.40	

=== Mount Ommaney ===
2020 Queensland state election: Mount Ommaney
Party	Candidate	Votes	%	±%
Labor	Jess Pugh	16,148	50.52	+7.82
Liberal National	Roger Hooper	10,252	32.07	−4.34
Greens	Asha Worsteling	3,526	11.03	−2.58
Legalise Cannabis	Clive Brazier	1,034	3.23	+3.23
One Nation	Michael Powell	819	2.56	−4.71
Independent	Ian Eugarde	184	0.58	+0.58
Total formal votes		31,963	97.25	+0.64
Informal votes		905	2.75	−0.64
Turnout		32,868	92.39	+1.65
Two-party-preferred result
Labor	Jess Pugh	20,012	62.61	+6.85
Liberal National	Roger Hooper	11,951	37.39	−6.85
Labor hold		Swing	+6.85	

=== Mudgeeraba ===
2020 Queensland state election: Mudgeeraba
Party	Candidate	Votes	%	±%
Liberal National	Ros Bates	15,640	48.96	+2.90
Labor	Maxim Otten-Kamp	8,472	26.52	+3.05
Greens	Scott Turner	2,857	8.94	−0.35
One Nation	Andrew Liddell	2,464	7.71	−10.07
Animal Justice	Lindon Cox	624	1.95	+1.95
United Australia	Brandon McMahon	565	1.77	+1.77
Independent	Gary Pead	528	1.65	+1.65
Civil Liberties & Motorists	Mark Pytellek	299	0.94	+0.94
Independent	Bill Sherwood	273	0.85	−1.25
Independent	Leith Erikson	224	0.70	+0.70
Total formal votes		31,946	95.04	+0.16
Informal votes		1,667	4.96	−0.16
Turnout		33,613	87.72	+1.31
Two-party-preferred result
Liberal National	Ros Bates	19,196	60.09	+0.24
Labor	Maxim Otten-Kamp	12,750	39.91	−0.24
Liberal National hold		Swing	+0.24	

=== Mulgrave ===
2020 Queensland state election: Mulgrave
Party	Candidate	Votes	%	±%
Labor	Curtis Pitt	14,254	49.86	+1.76
Liberal National	Gerry Vallianos	7,341	25.68	+2.87
Katter's Australian	Attila Feher-Holan	3,395	11.88	+11.88
One Nation	Francis Bartorillo	1,825	6.38	−15.96
Greens	Sue Cory	1,772	6.20	−0.54
Total formal votes		28,587	95.79	+0.68
Informal votes		1,256	4.21	−0.68
Turnout		29,843	83.75	−1.00
Two-party-preferred result
Labor	Curtis Pitt	17,793	62.24	+1.32
Liberal National	Gerry Vallianos	10,794	37.76	−1.32
Labor hold		Swing	+1.32	

=== Mundingburra ===
2020 Queensland state election: Mundingburra
Party	Candidate	Votes	%	±%
Labor	Les Walker	10,839	38.22	+6.80
Liberal National	Glenn Doyle	9,170	32.33	+6.21
Katter's Australian	Alannah Tomlinson	3,448	12.16	−1.72
Greens	Jenny Brown	1,953	6.89	−0.75
One Nation	Ian Bowron	1,323	4.67	−12.00
Legalise Cannabis	Susan Jackson	1,307	4.61	+4.61
United Australia	Martin Brewster	320	1.13	+1.13
Total formal votes		28,360	96.78	+1.63
Informal votes		945	3.22	−1.63
Turnout		29,305	87.73	+0.95
Two-party-preferred result
Labor	Les Walker	15,295	53.93	+2.80
Liberal National	Glenn Doyle	13,065	46.07	−2.80
Labor hold		Swing	+2.80	

=== Murrumba ===
2020 Queensland state election: Murrumba
Party	Candidate	Votes	%	±%
Labor	Steven Miles	17,433	50.55	+4.89
Liberal National	Yvonne Barlow	10,016	29.04	+3.31
Greens	Jason Kennedy	2,840	8.23	−0.96
One Nation	Karen Haddock	2,571	7.45	−11.96
Shooters, Fishers, Farmers	Leichelle McMahon	961	2.79	+2.79
Independent	Stewart Clark	667	1.93	+1.93
Total formal votes		34,488	96.45	+0.89
Informal votes		1,269	3.55	−0.89
Turnout		35,757	87.06	−0.24
Two-party-preferred result
Labor	Steven Miles	21,153	61.33	+1.81
Liberal National	Yvonne Barlow	13,335	38.67	−1.81
Labor hold		Swing	+1.81	

=== Nanango ===
2020 Queensland state election: Nanango
Party	Candidate	Votes	%	±%
Liberal National	Deb Frecklington	16,085	49.91	+1.91
Labor	Mark Stapleton	8,908	27.64	+8.37
One Nation	Tony Scrimshaw	4,737	14.70	−12.74
Legalise Cannabis	Maggie O'Rance	1,342	4.16	+4.16
Greens	John Harbison	1,154	3.58	−1.71
Total formal votes		32,226	97.40	+0.77
Informal votes		859	2.60	−0.77
Turnout		33,085	89.01	−0.59
Two-party-preferred result
Liberal National	Deb Frecklington	20,049	62.21	−3.70
Labor	Mark Stapleton	12,177	37.79	+3.70
Liberal National hold		Swing	−3.70	

=== Nicklin ===
2020 Queensland state election: Nicklin
Party	Candidate	Votes	%	±%
Liberal National	Marty Hunt	11,255	37.96	+6.26
Labor	Robert Skelton	10,214	34.45	+9.29
Greens	Sue Etheridge	3,702	12.49	+0.10
One Nation	Michael Cardinal	1,900	6.41	−14.61
Independent	Riccardo Bosi	1,387	4.68	+4.68
Informed Medical Options	Allona Lahn	1,190	4.01	+4.01
Total formal votes		29,648	96.30	+0.74
Informal votes		1,138	3.70	−0.74
Turnout		30,786	87.94	+0.10
Two-party-preferred result
Labor	Robert Skelton	14,866	50.14	+5.42
Liberal National	Marty Hunt	14,782	49.86	−5.42
Labor gain from Liberal National		Swing	+5.42	

=== Ninderry ===
2020 Queensland state election: Ninderry
Party	Candidate	Votes	%	±%
Liberal National	Dan Purdie	14,582	44.01	+7.90
Labor	Melinda Dodds	10,714	32.34	+9.58
Greens	Dan Bryar	4,149	12.52	−1.77
One Nation	Frank Weijers	2,072	6.25	−12.40
Informed Medical Options	Andrea Newland-Blackmore	1,344	4.06	+4.06
United Australia	Jay Giles	272	0.82	+0.82
Total formal votes		33,133	96.30	+1.26
Informal votes		1,274	3.70	−1.26
Turnout		34,407	88.60	+1.27
Two-party-preferred result
Liberal National	Dan Purdie	17,927	54.11	−4.27
Labor	Melinda Dodds	15,206	45.89	+4.27
Liberal National hold		Swing	−4.27	

=== Noosa ===
2020 Queensland state election: Noosa
Party	Candidate	Votes	%	±%
Independent	Sandy Bolton	14,051	43.92	+12.53
Liberal National	James Blevin	9,344	29.21	−0.24
Labor	Mark Denham	4,607	14.40	+1.59
Greens	Rhonda Prescott	2,300	7.19	−4.38
One Nation	Tracey Bell-Henselin	1,147	3.59	−8.18
Animal Justice	Darrell Redford	541	1.69	+1.69
Total formal votes		31,990	97.45	+1.18
Informal votes		837	2.55	−1.18
Turnout		32,827	89.21	+1.50
Notional two-party-preferred count (Note: Estimate two-party preferred count by Antony Green.)
Liberal National	James Blevin		51.60	
Labor	Mark Denham		48.40	
Two-candidate-preferred result
Independent	Sandy Bolton	21,065	65.85	+4.32
Liberal National	James Blevin	10,925	34.15	−4.32
Independent hold		Swing	+4.32	

=== Nudgee ===
2020 Queensland state election: Nudgee
Party	Candidate	Votes	%	±%
Labor	Leanne Linard	16,836	51.46	−0.39
Liberal National	Ryan Shaw	9,818	30.01	+1.31
Greens	Jim Davies	4,327	13.23	−0.10
One Nation	Carrol Halliwell	1,149	3.51	+3.51
Informed Medical Options	Dane Pritchard	584	1.79	+1.79
Total formal votes		32,714	97.50	+1.46
Informal votes		839	2.50	−1.46
Turnout		33,553	88.66	+0.49
Two-party-preferred result
Labor	Leanne Linard	21,292	65.09	+0.76
Liberal National	Ryan Shaw	11,422	34.91	−0.76
Labor hold		Swing	+0.76	

=== Oodgeroo ===
2020 Queensland state election: Oodgeroo
Party	Candidate	Votes	%	±%
Liberal National	Mark Robinson	12,083	40.87	−11.56
Labor	Irene Henley	8,231	27.84	−5.99
Independent	Claire Richardson	6,349	21.48	+21.48
Greens	Ian Mazlin	1,575	5.33	−8.41
One Nation	Douglas Chapman	984	3.33	+3.33
Informed Medical Options	Kirstyn Marriott	341	1.15	+1.15
Total formal votes		29,563	97.06	+1.48
Informal votes		894	2.94	−1.48
Turnout		30,457	92.20	+1.80
Two-party-preferred result
Liberal National	Mark Robinson	16,105	54.48	−2.76
Labor	Irene Henley	13,458	45.52	+2.76
Liberal National hold		Swing	−2.76	

=== Pine Rivers ===
2020 Queensland state election: Pine Rivers
Party	Candidate	Votes	%	±%
Labor	Nikki Boyd	14,953	44.48	+7.54
Liberal National	Kara Thomas	12,263	36.48	+9.62
Greens	Tara Seiffert-Smith	3,148	9.36	+0.59
One Nation	Christopher Leech	1,702	5.06	−7.11
Animal Justice	Maureen Brohman	549	1.63	+1.63
Informed Medical Options	Alissa Pattrick	427	1.27	+1.27
Independent	Bruce Vaschina	326	0.97	+0.97
United Australia	Steve Austin	250	0.74	+0.74
Total formal votes		33,618	96.79	+0.68
Informal votes		1,115	3.21	−0.68
Turnout		34,733	91.54	+0.26
Two-party-preferred result
Labor	Nikki Boyd	19,063	56.70	+0.52
Liberal National	Kara Thomas	14,555	43.30	−0.52
Labor hold		Swing	+0.52	

=== Pumicestone ===
2020 Queensland state election: Pumicestone
Party	Candidate	Votes	%	±%
Labor	Ali King	15,423	46.13	+10.56
Liberal National	Fiona Gaske	12,150	36.34	+6.46
One Nation	Ross Konowalenko	2,617	7.83	−15.51
Greens	Richard Ogden	1,460	4.37	−0.59
Legalise Cannabis	Ryan Dryden	1,414	4.23	+4.23
United Australia	Steven Newbery	372	1.11	+1.11
Total formal votes		33,436	96.94	+1.11
Informal votes		1,057	3.06	−1.11
Turnout		34,493	90.09	+2.04
Two-party-preferred result
Labor	Ali King	18,480	55.27	+6.11
Liberal National	Fiona Gaske	14,956	44.73	−6.11
Labor gain from Liberal National		Swing	+6.11	

=== Redcliffe ===
2020 Queensland state election: Redcliffe
Party	Candidate	Votes	%	±%
Labor	Yvette D'Ath	15,371	46.93	+1.73
Liberal National	Kerri-Anne Dooley	12,231	37.34	+0.10
Greens	Will Simon	2,364	7.22	−0.76
One Nation	Virginia Davy	1,427	4.36	+4.36
Independent	Ian Philp	694	2.12	−1.43
Independent	Carolyn Kerr	352	1.07	+1.07
United Australia	Bob Blohberger	314	0.96	+0.96
Total formal votes		32,753	96.91	+1.57
Informal votes		1,044	3.09	−1.57
Turnout		33,797	87.58	−0.04
Two-party-preferred result
Labor	Yvette D'Ath	18,377	56.11	+1.25
Liberal National	Kerri-Anne Dooley	14,376	43.89	−1.25
Labor hold		Swing	+1.25	

=== Redlands ===
2020 Queensland state election: Redlands
Party	Candidate	Votes	%	±%
Labor	Kim Richards	14,211	43.51	+11.22
Liberal National	Henry Pike	12,457	38.14	+6.37
Greens	Carmen McNaught	2,360	7.22	−1.28
One Nation	Peter Williams	1,356	4.15	−13.56
Legalise Cannabis	Frank Brady	1,132	3.47	+3.47
Informed Medical Options	Michelle Maher	494	1.51	+1.51
Shooters, Fishers, Farmers	Andrew Pope	442	1.35	+1.35
United Australia	Craig Gunnis	213	0.65	+0.65
Total formal votes		32,665	96.55	+0.57
Informal votes		1,167	3.45	−0.57
Turnout		33,832	89.89	+0.53
Two-party-preferred result
Labor	Kim Richards	17,606	53.90	+0.84
Liberal National	Henry Pike	15,059	46.10	−0.84
Labor hold		Swing	+0.84	

=== Rockhampton ===
2020 Queensland state election: Rockhampton
Party	Candidate	Votes	%	±%
Labor	Barry O'Rourke	13,289	44.32	+12.58
Liberal National	Tony Hopkins	7,118	23.74	+5.89
One Nation	Torin O'Brien	3,714	12.39	−9.00
Independent	Dominic Doblo	2,042	6.81	+6.81
Legalise Cannabis	Laura Barnard	1,189	3.97	+3.97
Katter's Australian	Christian Shepherd	1,151	3.84	+3.84
Greens	Mick Jones	1,025	3.42	−2.07
Informed Medical Options	Yvette Saxon	328	1.09	+1.09
United Australia	Paul Crangle	130	0.43	+0.43
Total formal votes		29,986	95.27	−0.45
Informal votes		1,489	4.73	+0.45
Turnout		31,475	86.18	−2.78
Two-party-preferred result
Labor	Barry O'Rourke	17,579	58.62	+0.60
Liberal National	Tony Hopkins	12,407	41.38	−0.60
Labor hold		Swing	+0.60	

=== Sandgate ===
2020 Queensland state election: Sandgate
Party	Candidate	Votes	%	±%
Labor	Stirling Hinchliffe	17,777	54.59	+5.44
Liberal National	Clark Siemsen	8,712	26.75	+3.52
Greens	Miree Le Roy	3,825	11.75	−0.92
One Nation	Rodney Miles	1,693	5.20	−9.75
Independent	Todd Milham	558	1.71	+1.71
Total formal votes		32,565	97.29	+0.81
Informal votes		908	2.71	−0.81
Turnout		33,473	90.82	+0.55
Two-party-preferred result
Labor	Stirling Hinchliffe	21,916	67.30	+3.82
Liberal National	Clark Siemsen	10,649	32.70	−3.82
Labor hold		Swing	+3.82	

=== Scenic Rim ===
2020 Queensland state election: Scenic Rim
Party	Candidate	Votes	%	±%
Liberal National	Jon Krause	15,592	47.47	+6.46
Labor	Luz Stanton	8,699	26.49	+4.99
One Nation	Paul Henselin	4,934	15.02	−12.57
Greens	Pietro Agnoletto	2,606	7.93	−1.97
Informed Medical Options	Deborah Husbands	700	2.13	+2.13
United Australia	Bradley Fowler	313	0.95	+0.95
Total formal votes		32,844	96.87	+0.75
Informal votes		1,061	3.13	−0.75
Turnout		33,905	89.51	−0.61
Two-party-preferred result
Liberal National	Jon Krause	20,182	61.45	+2.20
Labor	Luz Stanton	12,662	38.55	−2.20
Liberal National hold		Swing	+2.20	

=== South Brisbane ===
2020 Queensland state election: South Brisbane
Party	Candidate	Votes	%	±%
Greens	Amy MacMahon	12,631	37.89	+3.54
Labor	Jackie Trad	11,471	34.41	−1.59
Liberal National	Clem Grehan	7,616	22.85	−1.49
One Nation	Rosalie Taxis	573	1.72	+1.72
Independent	John Meyer	441	1.32	+1.32
Independent	John Jiggens	398	1.19	+1.19
United Australia	Marcus Thorne	206	0.62	+0.62
Total formal votes		33,336	97.42	+1.07
Informal votes		882	2.58	−1.07
Turnout		34,218	87.98	+4.26
Notional two-party-preferred count (Note: Estimate two-party preferred count by Antony Green.)
Labor	Jackie Trad		68.60	
Liberal National	Clem Grehan		31.40	
Two-candidate-preferred result
Greens	Amy MacMahon	18,450	55.35	+8.90
Labor	Jackie Trad	14,886	44.65	−8.90
Greens gain from Labor		Swing	+8.90	

=== Southern Downs ===
2020 Queensland state election: Southern Downs
Party	Candidate	Votes	%	±%
Liberal National	James Lister	16,285	51.60	+10.39
Labor	Joel Richters	8,198	25.98	+9.09
One Nation	Rosemary Moulden	3,182	10.08	−10.30
Shooters, Fishers, Farmers	Malcolm Richardson	1,398	4.43	+4.43
Greens	Tom Henderson	1,309	4.15	−0.17
Legalise Cannabis	Deborah Waldron	1,189	3.77	+3.77
Total formal votes		31,561	97.66	+1.32
Informal votes		756	2.34	−1.32
Turnout		32,317	89.70	−0.80
Two-party-preferred result
Liberal National	James Lister	20,229	64.09	−4.00
Labor	Joel Richters	11,332	35.91	+4.00
Liberal National hold		Swing	−4.00	

=== Southport ===
2020 Queensland state election: Southport
Party	Candidate	Votes	%	±%
Liberal National	Rob Molhoek	12,734	45.58	−1.50
Labor	Susie Gallagher	9,650	34.54	+4.87
Greens	Alan Quinn	2,532	9.06	−1.51
One Nation	Raphael Felix	1,631	5.84	+5.84
Independent	Brett Lambert	669	2.39	+2.39
United Australia	Maria Avdjieva	456	1.63	+1.63
Civil Liberties & Motorists	Jack Drake	267	0.96	−1.94
Total formal votes		27,939	95.66	+0.86
Informal votes		1,269	4.34	−0.86
Turnout		29,208	83.69	+1.33
Two-party-preferred result
Liberal National	Rob Molhoek	15,482	55.41	−1.83
Labor	Susie Gallagher	12,457	44.59	+1.83
Liberal National hold		Swing	−1.83	

=== Springwood ===
2020 Queensland state election: Springwood
Party	Candidate	Votes	%	±%
Labor	Mick de Brenni	15,066	48.79	+4.62
Liberal National	Kirrily Boulton	10,646	34.47	−5.80
Greens	Janina Leo	2,331	7.55	−1.50
One Nation	Glen Cookson	1,658	5.37	+5.37
Animal Justice	Judy Rush	686	2.22	+2.22
Civil Liberties & Motorists	Ian Sganzerla	261	0.85	−5.67
United Australia	George Sokolov	234	0.76	+0.76
Total formal votes		30,882	96.61	+1.33
Informal votes		1,083	3.39	−1.33
Turnout		31,965	90.36	+0.95
Two-party-preferred result
Labor	Mick de Brenni	18,005	58.30	+4.71
Liberal National	Kirrily Boulton	12,877	41.70	−4.71
Labor hold		Swing	+4.71	

=== Stafford ===
2020 Queensland state election: Stafford
Party	Candidate	Votes	%	±%
Labor	Jimmy Sullivan	15,472	45.57	−2.53
Liberal National	Ed Sangjitphun	10,837	31.92	−1.72
Greens	Stephen Bates	5,578	16.43	−1.85
One Nation	Kerrie Dwyer	1,006	2.96	+2.96
Civil Liberties & Motorists	Jeff Hodges	644	1.90	+1.90
Independent	Anthony Conciatore	417	1.23	+1.23
Total formal votes		33,954	97.62	+1.52
Informal votes		827	2.38	−1.52
Turnout		34,781	89.35	+1.07
Two-party-preferred result
Labor	Jimmy Sullivan	21,012	61.88	−0.22
Liberal National	Ed Sangjitphun	12,942	38.12	+0.22
Labor hold		Swing	−0.22	

=== Stretton ===
2020 Queensland state election: Stretton
Party	Candidate	Votes	%	±%
Labor	Duncan Pegg	16,128	56.59	+5.98
Liberal National	Peter Zhuang	8,609	30.21	+1.83
Greens	Andrea Wildin	2,483	8.71	+1.30
One Nation	Alexey Chekhunov	1,280	4.49	−7.38
Total formal votes		28,500	96.58	+1.55
Informal votes		1,010	3.42	−1.55
Turnout		29,510	87.80	+0.64
Two-party-preferred result
Labor	Duncan Pegg	18,473	64.82	+4.93
Liberal National	Peter Zhuang	10,027	35.18	−4.93
Labor hold		Swing	+4.93	

=== Surfers Paradise ===
2020 Queensland state election: Surfers Paradise
Party	Candidate	Votes	%	±%
Liberal National	John-Paul Langbroek	16,470	57.73	−5.50
Labor	Brianna Bailey	7,265	25.47	+3.06
Greens	Nelson Quinn	2,324	8.15	−0.96
One Nation	Leeanne Schultz	1,785	6.26	+6.26
United Australia	Roger McKay	684	2.40	+2.40
Total formal votes		28,528	96.51	+2.06
Informal votes		1,031	3.49	−2.06
Turnout		29,559	84.30	+3.34
Two-party-preferred result
Liberal National	John-Paul Langbroek	18,890	66.22	−3.57
Labor	Brianna Bailey	9,638	33.78	+3.57
Liberal National hold		Swing	−3.57	

=== Theodore ===
2020 Queensland state election: Theodore
Party	Candidate	Votes	%	±%
Liberal National	Mark Boothman	13,320	44.21	+4.50
Labor	Tracey Bell	11,516	38.22	+6.75
One Nation	Anita Holland	2,152	7.14	−11.88
Greens	John Woodlock	2,083	6.91	−2.88
Independent	Gale Oxenford	618	2.05	+2.05
United Australia	Robert Marks	438	1.45	+1.45
Total formal votes		30,127	95.68	+1.05
Informal votes		1,360	4.32	−1.05
Turnout		31,487	88.34	+2.87
Two-party-preferred result
Liberal National	Mark Boothman	16,066	53.33	−0.40
Labor	Tracey Bell	14,061	46.67	+0.40
Liberal National hold		Swing	−0.40	

=== Thuringowa ===
2020 Queensland state election: Thuringowa
Party	Candidate	Votes	%	±%
Labor	Aaron Harper	10,922	36.83	+4.63
Liberal National	Natalie Marr	9,022	30.42	+9.20
Katter's Australian	Julianne Wood	4,780	16.12	+0.53
One Nation	Jeni Alexander	2,907	9.80	−10.35
Greens	Heidi Hardisty	1,476	4.98	−0.62
United Australia	Michael (Blu) Turner	547	1.84	+1.84
Total formal votes		29,654	96.17	+1.28
Informal votes		1,182	3.83	−1.28
Turnout		30,836	85.57	−1.22
Two-party-preferred result
Labor	Aaron Harper	15,790	53.25	+2.10
Liberal National	Natalie Marr	13,864	46.75	−2.10
Labor hold		Swing	+2.10	

=== Toohey ===
2020 Queensland state election: Toohey
Party	Candidate	Votes	%	±%
Labor	Peter Russo	14,591	50.41	+5.80
Liberal National	Warren Craze	8,706	30.08	−0.19
Greens	Claire Garton	3,636	12.56	−2.06
Legalise Cannabis	Nikolas Peterson	1,072	3.70	+3.70
One Nation	Claudia Roel	939	3.24	−7.25
Total formal votes		28,944	96.69	+1.52
Informal votes		990	3.31	−1.52
Turnout		29,934	87.98	+1.84
Two-party-preferred result
Labor	Peter Russo	18,674	64.52	+4.50
Liberal National	Warren Craze	10,270	35.48	−4.50
Labor hold		Swing	+4.50	

=== Toowoomba North ===
2020 Queensland state election: Toowoomba North
Party	Candidate	Votes	%	±%
Liberal National	Trevor Watts	16,115	49.99	+7.80
Labor	Megan O'Hara Sullivan	11,297	35.04	+2.02
One Nation	Ron Humphrey	2,380	7.38	−7.28
Greens	Alyce Nelligan	2,080	6.45	−0.08
United Australia	Stella Sokolova	364	1.13	+1.13
Total formal votes		32,236	97.52	+1.13
Informal votes		819	2.48	−1.13
Turnout		33,055	88.33	+0.14
Two-party-preferred result
Liberal National	Trevor Watts	18,479	57.32	+1.60
Labor	Megan O'Hara Sullivan	13,757	42.68	−1.60
Liberal National hold		Swing	+1.60	

=== Toowoomba South ===
2020 Queensland state election: Toowoomba South
Party	Candidate	Votes	%	±%
Liberal National	David Janetzki	16,689	51.33	+4.83
Labor	Susan Krause	10,028	30.84	+3.91
One Nation	Dylan Kozlowski	2,502	7.70	−8.77
Greens	Thomas Coyne	2,232	6.87	−0.34
Independent	Rob Berry	570	1.75	−1.13
United Australia	Allan Turner	490	1.51	+1.51
Total formal votes		32,511	97.22	+0.96
Informal votes		929	2.78	−0.96
Turnout		33,440	88.58	−0.33
Two-party-preferred result
Liberal National	David Janetzki	19,579	60.22	+0.24
Labor	Susan Krause	12,932	39.78	−0.24
Liberal National hold		Swing	+0.24	

=== Townsville ===
2020 Queensland state election: Townsville
Party	Candidate	Votes	%	±%
Labor	Scott Stewart	10,289	36.20	+2.62
Liberal National	John Hathaway	9,508	33.45	+2.53
Katter's Australian	Joshua Schwarz	3,204	11.27	+11.27
Greens	Tom O'Grady	2,366	8.32	−2.53
One Nation	Clive Clarkson	1,293	4.55	−15.37
Animal Justice	Samara Grumberg	554	1.95	+1.95
Informed Medical Options	Toni McMahon	534	1.88	+1.88
United Australia	Greg Dowling	520	1.83	+1.83
NQ First	Clynton Hawks	157	0.55	+0.55
Total formal votes		28,425	95.04	−1.03
Informal votes		1,484	4.96	+1.03
Turnout		29,909	84.64	+0.70
Two-party-preferred result
Labor	Scott Stewart	15,099	53.12	+2.74
Liberal National	John Hathaway	13,326	46.88	−2.74
Labor hold		Swing	+2.74	

=== Traeger ===
2020 Queensland state election: Traeger
Party	Candidate	Votes	%	±%
Katter's Australian	Robbie Katter	12,047	58.85	−7.37
Labor	James Bambrick	4,219	20.61	+4.02
Liberal National	Marnie Smith	3,284	16.04	+5.99
Greens	Kristian Horvath	460	2.25	+0.10
Independent	Craig Scriven	277	1.35	−0.31
United Australia	Phillip Collins	182	0.89	+0.89
Total formal votes		20,469	97.00	+0.95
Informal votes		633	3.00	−0.95
Turnout		21,102	79.97	−2.07
Notional two-party-preferred count (Note: Estimate two-party preferred count by Antony Green.)
Liberal National	Marnie Smith		51.20	
Labor	James Bambrick		48.80	
Two-candidate-preferred result
Katter's Australian	Robbie Katter	15,295	74.72	−3.77
Labor	James Bambrick	5,174	25.28	+3.77
Katter's Australian hold		Swing	−3.77	

=== Warrego ===
2020 Queensland state election: Warrego
Party	Candidate	Votes	%	±%
Liberal National	Ann Leahy	14,100	55.98	+8.35
Labor	Mark O'Brien	4,966	19.72	−1.97
Katter's Australian	Rick Gurnett	2,842	11.28	−9.96
One Nation	Joshua Coyne	2,224	8.83	+8.83
Greens	Joshua Sanderson	569	2.26	−0.83
Independent	Mark Stone	487	1.93	−1.51
Total formal votes		25,188	97.97	+2.17
Informal votes		521	2.03	−2.17
Turnout		25,709	87.72	−0.71
Two-party-preferred result
Liberal National	Ann Leahy	18,424	73.15	+8.80
Labor	Mark O'Brien	6,764	26.85	−8.80
Liberal National hold		Swing	+8.80	

=== Waterford ===
2020 Queensland state election: Waterford
Party	Candidate	Votes	%	±%
Labor	Shannon Fentiman	14,759	54.52	+6.81
Liberal National	Andrew Caswell	6,902	25.49	+5.47
One Nation	Kim Miller	2,442	9.02	−11.68
Greens	Lachlan Smart	1,882	6.95	−0.37
Independent	Lanai Carter	688	2.54	+2.54
Civil Liberties & Motorists	Ben Olsen	400	1.48	+1.48
Total formal votes		27,073	94.87	+0.90
Informal votes		1,463	5.13	−0.90
Turnout		28,536	83.54	−0.88
Two-party-preferred result
Labor	Shannon Fentiman	17,873	66.02	+4.90
Liberal National	Andrew Caswell	9,200	33.98	−4.90
Labor hold		Swing	+4.90	

=== Whitsunday ===
2020 Queensland state election: Whitsunday
Party	Candidate	Votes	%	±%
Liberal National	Amanda Camm	9,592	32.85	+0.69
Labor	Angie Kelly	9,523	32.61	+1.45
One Nation	Deb Lawson	2,742	9.39	−10.66
NQ First	Jason Costigan	2,735	9.37	+9.37
Katter's Australian	Ciaron Paterson	1,803	6.17	−2.98
Legalise Cannabis	Paul Hilder	1,417	4.85	+4.85
Greens	Emma Barrett	1,134	3.88	−1.84
United Australia	Greg Armstrong	255	0.87	+0.87
Total formal votes		29,201	96.33	+0.36
Informal votes		1,114	3.67	−0.36
Turnout		30,315	87.05	+0.73
Two-party-preferred result
Liberal National	Amanda Camm	15,552	53.26	+2.58
Labor	Angie Kelly	13,649	46.74	−2.58
Liberal National hold		Swing	+2.58	

=== Woodridge ===
2020 Queensland state election: Woodridge
Party	Candidate	Votes	%	±%
Labor	Cameron Dick	18,935	66.97	+1.91
Liberal National	Russell Bauer	4,249	15.03	−0.01
One Nation	Lann Valentine	3,006	10.63	+10.63
Greens	Valerie Bennett	2,084	7.37	−0.19
Total formal votes		28,274	94.54	+2.40
Informal votes		1,634	5.46	−2.40
Turnout		29,908	81.30	−0.70
Two-party-preferred result
Labor	Cameron Dick	21,558	76.25	−0.12
Liberal National	Russell Bauer	6,716	23.75	+0.12
Labor hold		Swing	−0.12	

== Results by region ==
=== Brisbane ===
Results of the 2020 Queensland state election in Brisbane
Party	Votes	%	Swing	Seats	+/–
Labor					Steady
Liberal National				5	▼1
Greens				2	▲1
One Nation				0	Steady
Independents				0	Steady
Formal votes					
Informal votes					
Registered voters / turnout					
Two-party-preferred vote
Labor					
Liberal National					

=== Gold Coast ===
Results of the 2020 Queensland state election on the Gold Coast
Party	Votes	%	Swing	Seats	+/–
Liberal National				10	Steady
Labor				1	Steady
Greens				0	Steady
One Nation				0	Steady
Katter's Australian				0	Steady
Independents				0	Steady
Formal votes					
Informal votes					
Registered voters / turnout					
Two-party-preferred vote
Liberal National					
Labor					

=== Sunshine Coast ===
Results of the 2020 Queensland state election on the Sunshine Coast
Party	Votes	%	Swing	Seats	+/–
Liberal National				4	▼2
Labor				2	▲2
Greens				0	Steady
One Nation				0	Steady
Katter's Australian				0	Steady
Independents				1	Steady
Formal votes					
Informal votes					
Registered voters / turnout					
Two-party-preferred vote
Liberal National					
Labor					

=== Ipswich ===
Results of the 2020 Queensland state election in Ipswich
Party	Votes	%	Swing	Seats	+/–
Labor				4	Steady
Liberal National				0	Steady
Greens				0	Steady
One Nation				0	Steady
Katter's Australian				0	Steady
Independents				0	Steady
Formal votes					
Informal votes					
Total					
Registered voters / turnout					
Two-party-preferred vote
Labor					
Liberal National					

=== Townsville ===
Results of the 2020 Queensland state election in Townsville
Party	Votes	%	Swing	Seats	+/–
Labor				3	Steady
Liberal National				0	Steady
Greens				0	Steady
One Nation				0	Steady
Katter's Australian				0	Steady
Independents				0	Steady
Formal votes					
Informal votes					
Registered voters / turnout					
Two-party-preferred vote
Labor					
Liberal National					

=== Cairns ===
Results of the 2020 Queensland state election in Cairns
Party	Votes	%	Swing	Seats	+/–
Labor	25,112			2	Steady
Liberal National	22,597			0	Steady
Greens	6,963			0	Steady
One Nation	3,599			0	Steady
Informed Medical Options	1,299			0	Steady
United Australia	647			0	Steady
Formal votes	60,177	96.60			
Informal votes	2,115	3.40			
Registered voters / turnout	62,292				
Two-party-preferred vote
Labor	32,659	54.27	+1.65		
Liberal National	27,518	45.73	−1.65		

=== Toowoomba ===
Results of the 2020 Queensland state election in Toowoomba
Party	Votes	%	Swing	Seats	+/–
Liberal National	32,804			2	Steady
Labor	21,325			0	Steady
One Nation	4,882			0	Steady
Greens	4,312			0	Steady
United Australia	858			0	Steady
Independents	570			0	Steady
Formal votes	64,747				
Informal votes	1,749				
Registered voters / turnout	66,496				
Two-party-preferred vote
Liberal National	38,058	58.78	+0.90		
Labor	26,689	41.22	–0.90		

=== Regional Queensland ===
Results of the 2020 Queensland state election in regional Queensland
Party	Votes	%	Swing	Seats	+/–
Liberal National					▼2
Labor					▲2
One Nation				1	Steady
Katter's Australian				3	Steady
Greens				0	Steady
Independents				0	Steady
Formal votes					
Informal votes					
Registered voters / turnout					
Two-party-preferred vote
Liberal National					
Labor					

== Two party preferred preference flow ==
Minor party preference flows
Party	Labor	LNP
Party	%	%
Greens	80.1%	19.9%
One Nation	33.8%	66.2%
Katter's Australian	42.1%	57.9%
Legalise Cannabis	58.2%	41.8%
United Australia	35.6%	64.4%
IMOP	49.8%	50.2%
Animal Justice	61.8%	38.2%
Civil Liberties & Motorists	46.5%	53.3%
Independent	49.2%	50.8%
