= Electoral results for the district of Thuringowa =

Queensland, Australia, district election results

This is a list of electoral results for the electoral district of Thuringowa in Queensland state elections.

== Members for Thuringowa ==
Member	Party	Term
Ken McElligott	Labor	1986–1998
Ken Turner	One Nation	1998–1999
Ken Turner	Independent	1999–2001
Anita Phillips	Labor	2001–2004
Craig Wallace	Labor	2004–2012
Sam Cox	Liberal National	2012–2015
Aaron Harper	Labor	2015–2024
Natalie Marr	Liberal National	2024–present

== Election results ==
=== Elections in the 2020s ===
2024 Queensland state election: Thuringowa
Party	Candidate	Votes	%	±%
Liberal National	Natalie Marr	12,970	41.8	+11.4
Labor	Aaron Harper	9,102	29.4	−7.5
Katter's Australian	Reuben Richardson	4,348	14.0	−2.1
One Nation	Steven Clare	1,996	6.4	−3.4
Greens	Roxanne Kennedy-Perriman	1,392	4.5	−0.5
Independent	Natasha Lane	1,216	3.9	+3.9
Total formal votes		31,024	95.2	
Informal votes		1,567	4.8	
Turnout		32,591		
Two-party-preferred result
Liberal National	Natalie Marr	18,592	59.9	+13.2
Labor	Aaron Harper	12,432	40.1	−13.2
Liberal National gain from Labor		Swing	+13.2	

2020 Queensland state election: Thuringowa
Party	Candidate	Votes	%	±%
Labor	Aaron Harper	10,922	36.83	+4.63
Liberal National	Natalie Marr	9,022	30.42	+9.20
Katter's Australian	Julianne Wood	4,780	16.12	+0.53
One Nation	Jeni Alexander	2,907	9.80	−10.35
Greens	Heidi Hardisty	1,476	4.98	−0.62
United Australia	Michael (Blu) Turner	547	1.84	+1.84
Total formal votes		29,654	96.17	+1.28
Informal votes		1,182	3.83	−1.28
Turnout		30,836	85.57	−1.22
Two-party-preferred result
Labor	Aaron Harper	15,790	53.25	+2.10
Liberal National	Natalie Marr	13,864	46.75	−2.10
Labor hold		Swing	+2.10	

=== Elections in the 2010s ===
2017 Queensland state election: Thuringowa
Party	Candidate	Votes	%	±%
Labor	Aaron Harper	9,394	32.2	−8.9
Liberal National	Nick Martinez	6,191	21.2	−13.0
One Nation	Mark Thornton	5,878	20.2	+14.3
Katter's Australian	Terry Fox	4,546	15.6	+15.6
Greens	Mike Rubenach	1,633	5.6	+1.3
Independent	Stephen Lane	1,527	5.2	+5.2
Total formal votes		29,169	94.9	−2.5
Informal votes		1,572	5.1	+2.5
Turnout		30,741	86.8	−1.0
Two-candidate-preferred result
Labor	Aaron Harper	15,795	54.1	−2.4
One Nation	Mark Thornton	13,374	45.9	+45.9
Labor hold		Swing	−2.4	

2015 Queensland state election: Thuringowa
Party	Candidate	Votes	%	±%
Labor	Aaron Harper	11,584	39.51	+12.15
Liberal National	Sam Cox	9,945	33.92	−2.22
Palmer United	Ian Ferguson	3,407	11.62	+11.62
One Nation	Jeff Knuth	2,161	7.37	+7.37
Greens	Karen Thompson	1,028	3.51	−0.12
Family First	Michael Waters	617	2.10	−0.65
Independent	Margaret Bell	579	1.97	+1.97
Total formal votes		29,321	97.37	+0.07
Informal votes		792	2.63	−0.07
Turnout		30,113	89.49	−0.29
Two-party-preferred result
Labor	Aaron Harper	14,312	55.54	+12.20
Liberal National	Sam Cox	11,456	44.46	−12.20
Labor gain from Liberal National		Swing	+12.20	

2012 Queensland state election: Thuringowa
Party	Candidate	Votes	%	±%
Liberal National	Sam Cox	9,837	36.14	+2.28
Katter's Australian	Steve Todeschini	8,201	30.13	+30.13
Labor	Craig Wallace	7,448	27.36	−21.78
Greens	Bernie Williams	986	3.62	−0.64
Family First	Adrian Britton	749	2.75	+2.75
Total formal votes		27,221	97.30	+0.30
Informal votes		754	2.70	−0.30
Turnout		27,975	89.78	−0.08
Two-candidate-preferred result
Liberal National	Sam Cox	10,857	51.38	+9.85
Katter's Australian	Steve Todeschini	10,274	48.62	+48.62
Liberal National gain from Labor		Swing	N/A	

=== Elections in the 2000s ===
2009 Queensland state election: Thuringowa
Party	Candidate	Votes	%	±%
Labor	Craig Wallace	12,830	49.1	−11.3
Liberal National	Tony Elms	8,841	33.9	+5.1
Independent	Ken Turner	2,793	10.7	+10.7
Greens	Frank Reilly	1,113	4.3	−2.1
Independent	Paul Lynam	534	2.0	+2.0
Total formal votes		26,111	96.5	
Informal votes		807	3.5	
Turnout		26,918	89.9	
Two-party-preferred result
Labor	Craig Wallace	13,574	58.5	−8.4
Liberal National	Tony Elms	9,641	41.5	+8.4
Labor hold		Swing	−8.4	

2006 Queensland state election: Thuringowa
Party	Candidate	Votes	%	±%
Labor	Craig Wallace	16,613	60.5	+15.7
National	Rod Hardacre	7,815	28.5	+3.0
Greens	Frank Reilly	1,698	6.2	+0.5
One Nation	Bill Hankin	1,311	4.8	−5.0
Total formal votes		27,437	96.9	−0.3
Informal votes		871	3.1	+0.3
Turnout		28,308	90.8	−1.3
Two-party-preferred result
Labor	Craig Wallace	17,255	67.0	+9.1
National	Rod Hardacre	8,493	33.0	−9.1
Labor hold		Swing	+9.1	

2004 Queensland state election: Thuringowa
Party	Candidate	Votes	%	±%
Labor	Craig Wallace	11,647	44.8	+3.8
National	Sandra Chesney	6,635	25.5	+6.8
Independent	David Moyle	3,338	12.8	+12.8
One Nation	Bill Hankin	2,550	9.8	+9.8
Greens	Meg Davis	1,491	5.7	+5.7
Independent	John Ryan	350	1.3	+1.3
Total formal votes		26,011	97.2	−0.3
Informal votes		755	2.8	+0.3
Turnout		26,766	92.1	−0.9
Two-party-preferred result
Labor	Craig Wallace	12,982	57.9	+4.3
National	Sandra Chesney	9,441	42.1	+42.1
Labor hold		Swing	+4.3	

2001 Queensland state election: Thuringowa
Party	Candidate	Votes	%	±%
Labor	Anita Phillips	9,952	41.0	+4.9
Independent	Ken Turner	6,258	25.8	+25.8
National	Neil Weekes	4,532	18.7	+9.6
Liberal	Marnie Nelson	2,447	10.1	−7.6
City Country Alliance	Adam Morton	762	3.1	+3.1
Independent	Wolfe Lindner	311	1.3	+1.3
Total formal votes		24,262	97.5	
Informal votes		633	2.5	
Turnout		24,895	93.0	
Two-candidate-preferred result
Labor	Anita Phillips	11,052	53.6	+9.2
Independent	Ken Turner	9,581	46.4	+46.4
Labor gain from One Nation		Swing	+9.2	

=== Elections in the 1990s ===
1998 Queensland state election: Thuringowa
Party	Candidate	Votes	%	±%
Labor	Ken McElligott	8,976	35.1	−11.3
One Nation	Ken Turner	8,918	34.9	+34.9
Liberal	David Moore	4,430	17.3	+17.3
National	Ross Contarino	2,434	9.5	−34.6
Democrats	Annette Reed	518	2.0	−7.4
Independent	Lilian Malcolm	278	1.1	+1.1
Total formal votes		25,554	98.4	+0.3
Informal votes		405	1.6	−0.3
Turnout		25,959	93.4	+2.8
Two-candidate-preferred result
One Nation	Ken Turner	13,720	56.6	+56.6
Labor	Ken McElligott	10,508	43.4	−8.0
One Nation gain from Labor		Swing	+56.6	

1995 Queensland state election: Thuringowa
Party	Candidate	Votes	%	±%
Labor	Ken McElligott	10,406	46.5	−5.6
National	Richard Lane	9,881	44.1	+15.7
Democrats	Annette Reed	2,111	9.4	+9.4
Total formal votes		22,398	98.2	+0.8
Informal votes		419	1.8	−0.8
Turnout		22,817	90.6	
Two-party-preferred result
Labor	Ken McElligott	11,292	51.4	−5.7
National	Richard Lane	10,673	48.6	+5.7
Labor hold		Swing	−5.7	

1992 Queensland state election: Thuringowa
Party	Candidate	Votes	%	±%
Labor	Ken McElligott	10,062	52.1	−3.4
National	Sandra Chesney	5,482	28.4	+2.4
Liberal	Harold Burch	2,980	15.4	−3.0
Independent	Daro Maroevic	795	4.1	+4.1
Total formal votes		19,319	97.4	
Informal votes		523	2.6	
Turnout		19,842	92.1	
Two-party-preferred result
Labor	Ken McElligott	10,627	57.1	−1.9
National	Sandra Chesney	7,973	42.9	+1.9
Labor hold		Swing	−1.9	

=== Elections in the 1980s ===
1989 Queensland state election: Thuringowa
Party	Candidate	Votes	%	±%
Labor	Ken McElligott	13,513	56.5	+10.9
National	Reg Fenton	6,008	25.1	−10.5
Liberal	Sandra Chesney	4,397	18.4	−0.1
Total formal votes		23,918	96.4	−1.8
Informal votes		893	3.6	+1.8
Turnout		24,811	89.0	−0.5
Two-party-preferred result
Labor	Ken McElligott	14,351	60.0	+9.3
National	Reg Fenton	9,567	40.0	−9.3
Labor hold		Swing	+9.3	

1986 Queensland state election: Thuringowa
Party	Candidate	Votes	%	±%
Labor	Ken McElligott	8,696	45.9	
National	Bronwyn Walker	6,757	35.6	
Liberal	Allan Paulsen	3,513	18.5	
Total formal votes		18,966	98.2	
Informal votes		347	1.8	
Turnout		19,313	89.5	
Two-party-preferred result
Labor	Ken McElligott	9,624	50.7	−3.5
National	Bronwyn Walker	9,342	49.3	+3.5
Labor hold		Swing	−3.5	
