= Electoral results for the district of Buderim =

Queensland, Australia, district election results

This is a list of electoral results for the electoral district of Buderim in Queensland state elections.

== Members for Buderim ==
Member	Party	Term
Steve Dickson	Liberal National	2009–2017
Steve Dickson	One Nation	2017
Brent Mickelberg	Liberal National	2017–present

== Election results ==
=== Elections in the 2020s ===
2024 Queensland state election: Buderim
Party	Candidate	Votes	%	±%
Liberal National	Brent Mickelberg	17,670	48.87	+6.37
Labor	Adrian Burke	9,778	27.04	−1.26
Greens	Deborah Moseley	4,190	11.59	+0.79
One Nation	Ryan Beall	2,493	6.89	+2.19
Legalise Cannabis	Shaun Sandow	2,027	5.61	+5.61
Total formal votes		36,158	96.60	−0.83
Informal votes		1,271	3.40	+0.83
Turnout		37,429	89.20	+0.07
Two-party-preferred result
Liberal National	Brent Mickelberg	21,436	59.28	+3.99
Labor	Adrian Burke	14,722	40.72	−3.99
Liberal National hold		Swing	+3.99	

2020 Queensland state election: Buderim
Party	Candidate	Votes	%	±%
Liberal National	Brent Mickelberg	13,443	42.52	+5.65
Labor	Ken Mackenzie	8,932	28.25	+5.82
Greens	Deborah Moseley	3,422	10.82	−1.30
Independent	Steve Dickson	2,234	7.07	+7.07
One Nation	Joyce Hosking	1,477	4.67	−23.89
Independent	Michael Andrews	741	2.34	+2.34
Informed Medical Options	Alina Lee	601	1.90	+1.90
Independent	Alison Barry-Jones	572	1.81	+1.81
United Australia	Daniel Philp	191	0.60	+0.60
Total formal votes		31,613	96.07	−0.37
Informal votes		1,293	3.93	+0.37
Turnout		32,906	89.13	+1.03
Two-party-preferred result
Liberal National	Brent Mickelberg	17,478	55.29	−6.12
Labor	Ken Mackenzie	14,135	44.71	+6.12
Liberal National hold		Swing	−6.12	

=== Elections in the 2010s ===
2017 Queensland state election: Buderim
Party	Candidate	Votes	%	±%
Liberal National	Brent Mickelberg	10,911	36.9	−15.3
One Nation	Steve Dickson	8,452	28.6	+28.6
Labor	Ken MacKenzie	6,638	22.4	−1.2
Greens	Tracy Burton	3,587	12.1	+1.2
Total formal votes		29,588	96.4	−1.5
Informal votes		1,091	3.6	+1.5
Turnout		30,679	88.1	+4.0
Two-party-preferred result
Liberal National	Brent Mickelberg	18,169	61.4	−0.4
Labor	Ken MacKenzie	11,419	38.6	+0.4
Liberal National hold		Swing	−0.4	

2015 Queensland state election: Buderim
Party	Candidate	Votes	%	±%
Liberal National	Steve Dickson	15,297	52.62	−9.55
Labor	Elaine Hughes	6,627	22.80	+6.61
Palmer United	Tess Lazarus	3,781	13.01	+13.01
Greens	Susan Etheridge	3,366	11.58	+0.93
Total formal votes		29,071	97.90	−0.15
Informal votes		625	2.10	+0.15
Turnout		29,696	89.75	−0.01
Two-party-preferred result
Liberal National	Steve Dickson	16,353	62.16	−13.85
Labor	Elaine Hughes	9,954	37.84	+13.85
Liberal National hold		Swing	−13.85	

2012 Queensland state election: Buderim
Party	Candidate	Votes	%	±%
Liberal National	Steve Dickson	16,056	62.17	+5.15
Labor	Chris Moore	4,181	16.19	−13.26
Greens	Susan Etheridge	2,749	10.64	+2.39
Katter's Australian	Lynette Bishop	2,003	7.76	+7.76
Family First	Tony Moore	838	3.24	+0.81
Total formal votes		25,827	98.04	−0.30
Informal votes		516	1.96	+0.30
Turnout		26,343	89.76	−1.10
Two-party-preferred result
Liberal National	Steve Dickson	17,329	76.01	+11.73
Labor	Chris Moore	5,469	23.99	−11.73
Liberal National hold		Swing	+11.73	

=== Elections in the 2000s ===
2009 Queensland state election: Buderim
Party	Candidate	Votes	%	±%
Liberal National	Steve Dickson	14,349	57.0	+5.3
Labor	Laura Hawkins	7,410	29.4	−4.6
Greens	Danny Stevens	2,075	8.2	−3.7
DS4SEQ	Neil Heyme	719	2.9	+2.9
Family First	Cathy Turner	611	2.4	+2.4
Total formal votes		25,164	98.1	
Informal votes		425	1.9	
Turnout		25,589	90.9	
Two-party-preferred result
Liberal National	Steve Dickson	15,120	64.3	+4.9
Labor	Laura Hawkins	8,402	35.7	−4.9
Liberal National hold		Swing	+4.9	
