= Electoral results for the district of Ninderry =

Queensland, Australia, district election results

This is a list of electoral results for the electoral district of Ninderry in Queensland state elections.

== Members for Ninderry ==
Member	Party	Term
Dan Purdie	Liberal National	2017–present

== Election results ==
=== Elections in the 2020s ===
2024 Queensland state election: Ninderry
Party	Candidate	Votes	%	±%
Liberal National	Dan Purdie	17,950	48.43	+4.43
Labor	Jo Justo	9,774	26.37	−6.03
Greens	Tom Carden	3,738	10.08	−2.42
One Nation	Michael Stewart	3,243	8.75	+2.55
Legalise Cannabis	Timothy Nixon	2,362	6.37	+6.37
Total formal votes		37,067	96.34	
Informal votes		1,407	3.66	
Turnout		38,474	88.70	
Two-party-preferred result
Liberal National	Dan Purdie	22,411	60.46	+6.36
Labor	Jo Justo	14,656	39.54	−6.36
Liberal National hold		Swing	+6.36	

2020 Queensland state election: Ninderry
Party	Candidate	Votes	%	±%
Liberal National	Dan Purdie	14,582	44.01	+7.90
Labor	Melinda Dodds	10,714	32.34	+9.58
Greens	Dan Bryar	4,149	12.52	−1.77
One Nation	Frank Weijers	2,072	6.25	−12.40
Informed Medical Options	Andrea Newland-Blackmore	1,344	4.06	+4.06
United Australia	Jay Giles	272	0.82	+0.82
Total formal votes		33,133	96.30	+1.26
Informal votes		1,274	3.70	−1.26
Turnout		34,407	88.60	+1.27
Two-party-preferred result
Liberal National	Dan Purdie	17,927	54.11	−4.27
Labor	Melinda Dodds	15,206	45.89	+4.27
Liberal National hold		Swing	−4.27	

=== Elections in the 2010s ===
2017 Queensland state election: Ninderry
Party	Candidate	Votes	%	±%
Liberal National	Dan Purdie	10,703	36.1	−7.3
Labor	Bill Gissane	6,744	22.8	+1.0
One Nation	Barry Ward	5,529	18.7	+18.7
Greens	Sue Etheridge	4,237	14.3	+0.6
Independent	Richard Bruinsma	1,479	5.0	+5.0
Independent	Jamila Riley	944	3.2	+3.2
Total formal votes		29,636	95.0	−2.8
Informal votes		1,546	5.0	+2.8
Turnout		31,182	87.3	+3.3
Two-party-preferred result
Liberal National	Dan Purdie	17,301	58.4	+1.5
Labor	Bill Gissane	12,335	41.6	−1.5
Liberal National hold		Swing	+1.5	
