= Ken Turner (Australian politician) =

Australian politician

Member of the Queensland Legislative Assembly for Thuringowa
- In office 13 June 1998 – 7 February 2001
- Preceded by: Ken McElligott
- Succeeded by: Anita Phillips

Personal details
- Born: Kenneth Turner; 6 May 1944 (age 82) Brisbane, Queensland, Australia
- Party: Independent (since 1999)
- Other political affiliations: One Nation (1997–1999)
- Occupation: Fishery director (Self–employed)
- Profession: Commercial fisherman Politician

Military service
- Allegiance: Commonwealth of Australia
- Branch/service: Australian Army Reserve
- Years of service: 1961–1965
- Rank: Second Lieutenant
- Battles/wars: Vietnam War

Kenneth Turner (born 6 May 1944) is a former Australian politician. He was born in Brisbane. Before his involvement in politics he was a commercial fisherman, and served in the Citizens Military Force 1961–1965. In 1998 he was elected to the Legislative Assembly of Queensland as a member of Pauline Hanson's One Nation, representing the seat of Thuringowa. He was appointed Spokesperson for Communication, Local Government, Planning, Regional and Rural Communities, Environment, Heritage and Natural Resources, and Primary Industries on 7 August. On 6 February 1999, together with party colleagues Dorothy Pratt and Shaun Nelson, he resigned from One Nation to sit as an independent. He was defeated by Labor's Anita Phillips in 2001. He contested Thuringowa again at the 2009 state election against sitting Labor MP Craig Wallace, but received only around 11% of the vote.

Parliament of Queensland
Preceded by Ken McElligott	Member for Thuringowa; 1998–2001	Succeeded by Anita Phillips
