= Department of Natural Resources and Water =

The Department of Natural Resources and Water is a defunct Queensland Government department. Its functions are now part of the Department of Environment and Heritage Protection. The former department's functions included Aboriginal and Torres Strait Islander matters, Climate Change Policy and Science, Commercial Forestry, Commercial Water Services, Land (including Crown Land and Freehold Titles Registration), Native Title, Natural Resource Management (including Vegetation Management), Catchment Management, Place Names, Quarry Sales, Recreation, Registration of Valuers and Surveyors and Water Recycling Strategy.

The Department's final Minister was the Honourable Craig Wallace MP (as then Minister for Natural Resources and Water and Minister assisting the Premier in North Queensland and the Member for Thuringowa). The final Director-General was Scott Spencer.

The department's former names include:

- Department of Natural Resources, Mines and Water

The Department of Natural Resources, Mines and Water is the former name of the Department of Natural Resources and Water. The department changed its name after the 9 September 2006 State election when responsibility for the Mines administrative unit was transferred to the new Department of Mines and Energy.

- Department of Natural Resources and Mines
- Department of Natural Resources, Mines and Energy
- Department of Natural Resources
