= Electoral district of Buderim =

State electoral district of Queensland, Australia

Buderim Queensland—Legislative Assembly
- Map of the electoral district of Buderim, 2017
- State: Queensland
- Dates current: 2009–present
- MP: Brent Mickelberg
- Party: Liberal National
- Namesake: Buderim
- Electors: 36,918 (2020)
- Area: 67 km^{2} (25.9 sq mi)
- Demographic: Provincial
- Coordinates: 26°40′S 153°3′E
Electorates around Buderim:
Ninderry	Ninderry	Maroochydore
Nicklin	Buderim	Kawana
Caloundra	Kawana	Kawana

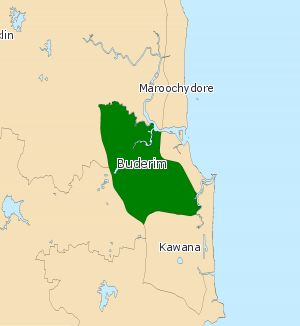
2008 map

Buderim is an electoral district of the Legislative Assembly in the Australian state of Queensland. Based on the Sunshine Coast, the district is a traditionally safe seat for the Liberal National Party.

== Geography ==
A compact urban electorate, Buderim falls between the centres of Maroochydore and Nambour, bounded by the Bruce Highway to the west, and the Sunshine Motorway to the east. It includes the Sunshine Coast suburbs of Buderim, Mountain Creek, Sippy Downs and Tanawha.

== History ==
A new district created for the 2009 state election, it was constructed mostly from the northern part of the district of Kawana and the western part of the district of Maroochydore. It also took a section of territory previously belonging to the district of Nicklin. Its inaugural member was Steve Dickson, previously the member for Kawana.

== Members for Buderim ==
Member	Party	Term
Steve Dickson	Liberal National	2009–2017
Steve Dickson	One Nation	2017
Brent Mickelberg	Liberal National	2017–present

== Election results ==
2024 Queensland state election: Buderim
Party	Candidate	Votes	%	±%
Liberal National	Brent Mickelberg	17,670	48.87	+6.37
Labor	Adrian Burke	9,778	27.04	−1.26
Greens	Deborah Moseley	4,190	11.59	+0.79
One Nation	Ryan Beall	2,493	6.89	+2.19
Legalise Cannabis	Shaun Sandow	2,027	5.61	+5.61
Total formal votes		36,158	96.60	−0.83
Informal votes		1,271	3.40	+0.83
Turnout		37,429	89.20	+0.07
Two-party-preferred result
Liberal National	Brent Mickelberg	21,436	59.28	+3.99
Labor	Adrian Burke	14,722	40.72	−3.99
Liberal National hold		Swing	+3.99	

Primary vote results in Buderim (Parties that have never gotten 5% of the vote are omitted)
Liberal National
Labor
Greens
One Nation
Palmer United/United Australia Party
Katter's Australian
Independent
View source data.
Two-party-preferred vote vote results in Buderim View source data.
