= Electoral district of Thuringowa =

State electoral district of Queensland, Australia

Thuringowa Queensland—Legislative Assembly
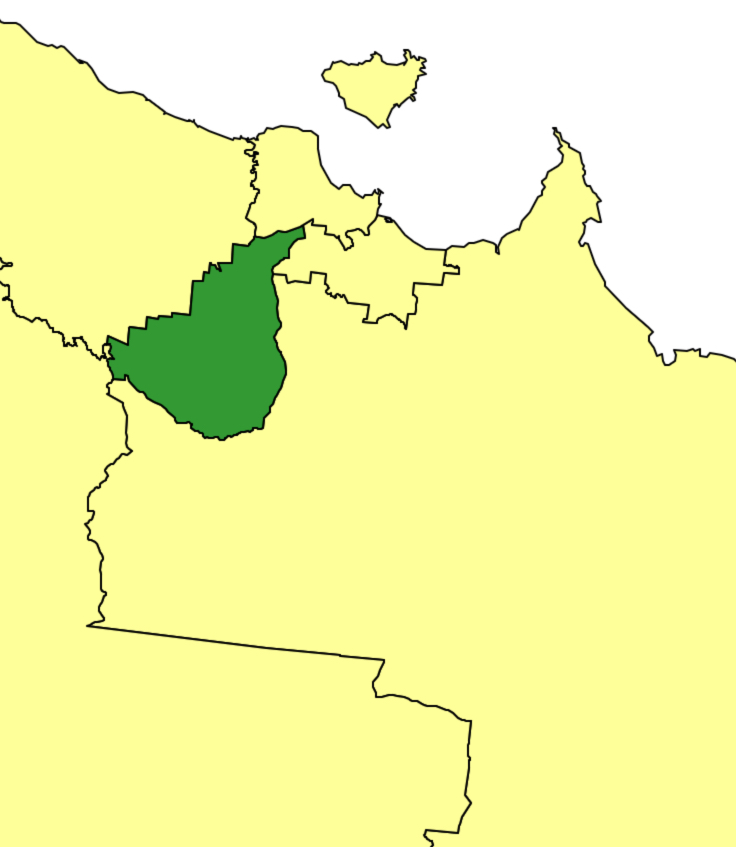
- Electoral map of Thuringowa, 2024
- State: Queensland
- MP: Natalie Marr
- Party: Liberal National
- Namesake: City of Thuringowa
- Electors: 36,034 (2020)
- Area: 261 km^{2} (100.8 sq mi)
- Demographic: Provincial
- Coordinates: 19°22′S 146°39′E
Electorates around Thuringowa:
Hinchinbrook	Hinchinbrook	Townsville
Hinchinbrook	Thuringowa	Mundingburra
Traeger	Burdekin	Burdekin

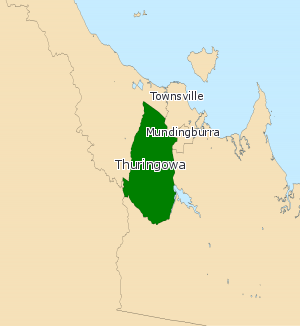
Electoral map of Thuringowa 2008

Thuringowa is an electorate in the Legislative Assembly of the state of Queensland, Australia.

The division encompasses suburbs of the former City of Thuringowa on the western edge of Townsville in North Queensland, stretching from Deeragun in the north to Kelso in the south. It includes the suburbs of Bushland Beach, Shaw, Thuringowa Central, Rasmussen, Condon and Kirwan.

The Electorate is bordered by the Hinchinbrook (North and West), Burdekin (South), Mundingburra and Townsville (both East) Electorates.

== History ==
The Electoral district of Thuringowa was created relatively recently in 1986, mostly from the western section of the Townsville Electorate.

Thuringowa Electorate was one of eleven State seats held by Pauline Hanson's One Nation Party from 1998, until it was returned to Labor in the 2001 landslide.

In 2004 the one term sitting member, Anita Phillips did not recontest, instead choosing to challenge Peter Lindsay (unsuccessfully) for the Federal Division of Herbert.

Labor's Craig Wallace held the seat from 2004. In the 2006 election Thuringowa went against the statewide trend of a slight swing against Labor, Mr. Wallace achieved a swing towards Labor of 16.2% primary vote and 9.5% two party preferred. Immediately after the election he was appointed Parliamentary Secretary for North Queensland, and two months later was promoted to Cabinet as the new Minister for Natural Resources and Water and Minister Assisting the Premier in North Queensland when a Cabinet vacancy was created by the resignation of then Attorney-General Linda Lavarch in late October 2006.

== Members for Thuringowa ==
Member	Party	Term
Ken McElligott	Labor	1986–1998
Ken Turner	One Nation	1998–1999
Ken Turner	Independent	1999–2001
Anita Phillips	Labor	2001–2004
Craig Wallace	Labor	2004–2012
Sam Cox	Liberal National	2012–2015
Aaron Harper	Labor	2015–2024
Natalie Marr	Liberal National	2024–present

== Election results ==
2024 Queensland state election: Thuringowa
Party	Candidate	Votes	%	±%
Liberal National	Natalie Marr	12,970	41.81	+11.41
Labor	Aaron Harper	9,102	29.34	−7.56
Katter's Australian	Reuben Richardson	4,348	14.01	−2.09
One Nation	Steven Clare	1,996	6.43	−3.37
Greens	Roxanne Kennedy-Perriman	1,392	4.49	−0.51
Independent	Natasha Lane	1,216	3.92	+3.92
Total formal votes		31,024	95.2	
Informal votes		1,567	4.8	
Turnout		32,591	84.41	
Two-party-preferred result
Liberal National	Natalie Marr	18,592	59.93	+13.23
Labor	Aaron Harper	12,432	40.07	−13.23
Liberal National gain from Labor		Swing	+13.23	

Primary vote results in Thuringowa (Parties that did not get 5% of the vote are omitted)
Labor
Liberal National

National
Liberal

One Nation
Katter's Australian
Greens
Australian Democrats
Palmer United/United Australia Party
Independent
View source data.
Two-candidate-preferred vote results in Thuringowa View source data.
