= Anita Phillips =

Australian politician (1945–2023)

Dr. Anita Phillips

Member of the Queensland Legislative Assembly for Thuringowa
- In office 17 February 2001 – 7 February 2004
- Preceded by: Ken Turner
- Succeeded by: Craig Wallace

Personal details
- Born: 14 March 1945 Melbourne, Australia
- Died: 4 February 2023 (aged 77) Sunshine Coast University Hospital, Australia
- Party: Labor
- Education: University of Canberra, University of Melbourne
- Occupation: Social worker

Anita Frances Phillips (14 March 1945 – 4 February 2023) was an Australian politician. She was a Member of the Queensland Legislative Assembly.

== Early life ==
Phillips was born in Melbourne on 14 March 1945, the daughter of John Phillips and Anita (née Kerridge). The family lived in a housing commission estate in the outer suburbs (at that time of Melbourne). From 1952 to 1957 she attended St Michaels Catholic Primary School in Ashburton. Later, she attended St Rochs School in Glen Iris, Our Holy Redeemer School in Ripponlea, and Presentation College, Windsor.

She studied at the University of Melbourne, receiving a Diploma of Social Studies in 1968 and a Bachelor of Arts in 1976.

In 1969, she moved to Townsville in Queensland and became a social worker.

She studied at the University of Canberra, completing a Masters of Public Administration in 1990.

== Politics ==
In 2001, Phillips was elected to the Legislative Assembly of Queensland as the Labor member for Thuringowa, defeating One Nation-turned-independent sitting member Ken Turner. After being elected, she thanked former Victorian Premier, Joan Kirner, for being a mentor. She also thanked the ALP's support through the Emily's List scheme to increase female representation in parliaments around Australia.

In 2004, she retired in order to contest the federal seat of Herbert, held by the Liberal Party's Peter Lindsay, in the 2004 federal election but was unsuccessful.

== Later life ==
Phillips served in a number of roles:

- ACT Public Advocate (circa 2005–2013)
- advisor to federal ministers
- executive roles on the Leichhardt and Queanbeyan local governments
- board member on the Sunshine Coast Health and Hospital Board (2017–2022)

In 2012, Phillips completed a Post Graduate Diploma in Legal Studies at the University of Canberra. In 2022, Phillips completed a PhD at the University of Canberra titled "The process of policy development using the NDIS as a case study".

On 4 February 2023, Phillips died after a short illness in the Sunshine Coast University Hospital.

Parliament of Queensland
Preceded by Ken Turner	Member for Thuringowa; 2001–2004	Succeeded by Craig Wallace
