= Civil Liberties & Motorists Party =

- Leader: Jeffrey Hodges
- Headquarters: Flaxton, Queensland, Australia
- Ideology: Single-issue politics State ownership
- Political position: Right-wing

Website
- www.motorists.org.au

Civil Liberties & Motorists Party, formerly the Motorists Party; Civil Liberties, Consumer Rights, No-Tolls; Consumer Rights & No-Tolls Party; No-Tolls.org; No Tolls, No Sell Offs; and Consumer Rights & No-Tolls is a Queensland-based political party. It has been registered in Queensland since 2015.

== History ==
Founded by Jeffrey Hodges in 2012 as no-tolls.org in order to end the tolling of the Gateway and Logan Motorways in South East Queensland. The party name was changed to the Consumer Rights & No-Tolls Party and was registered with the Electoral Commission Queensland for state and local government elections since 23 October 2015, and Jeffrey Hodges stood for Mayor of Brisbane in the 2016 Brisbane City Council Mayoral election on 19 March 2016, receiving 12,600 first preference votes (2.11%).

The Consumer Rights party which was registered with the Australian Electoral Commission on 7 March 2016 and deregistered on 9 May 2018. Hodges was the only candidate endorsed by the party for the 2016 federal election, for the House of Representatives seat of Rankin.

On 20 June 2017, the party changed its name on the Queensland party register to Civil Liberties, Consumer Rights, No-Tolls and ran eight candidates at the 2017 Queensland state election.

On 7 February 2018, the Australian Electoral Commission issued a notice that it was considering deregistering the party on the grounds that it had ceased to have at least 500 members. While the notice about deregistration was still on the Electoral Commission website, a new notice was posted on 7 May 2018 reflecting an application to enter a logo, however, the next day the AEC confirmed the party had been deregistered. The secretary of the party appealed the deregistration decision however the three person Electoral Commission affirmed the decision to deregister on 21 August 2018.

The party remains registered in Queensland. The party was renamed the Motorist Party in 2019, then Civil Liberties & Motorists Party in 2020.

The party stood 16 candidates in the 2020 Queensland state election in the seats of Stafford, Aspley, Mirani, Inala, Capalaba, Gregory, Macalister, Mermaid Beach, Gaven, Southport, Mudgeeraba, Ipswich West, Waterford, Springwood, Moggill and Clayfield.
