= Dan Purdie =

Australian politician

The Honourable Dan Purdie MP

Member of the Queensland Legislative Assembly for Ninderry
- Incumbent
- Assumed office 25 November 2017

Minister for Police and Emergency Services
- Incumbent
- Assumed office 1 November 2024
- Premier: David Crisafulli
- Preceded by: Mark Ryan

Shadow Minister for Police and Community Safety
- In office 28 April 2020 – 1 November 2024
- Leader: David Crisafulli
- Preceded by: Trevor Watts
- Succeeded by: Glenn Butcher

Personal details
- Born: 20 July 1973 (age 53) Townsville, Queensland
- Party: Liberal National Party
- Spouse: Andrea
- Children: 2 daughters
- Occupation: Police officer, politician

Daniel Gerard Purdie (born 20 July 1973) is an Australian politician, serving as the member for Ninderry since 2017.

== Early life and police career ==
Purdie was born on the 20th of July, 1973, to Rick, a cabinetmaker and musician, and Margaret, a stay-at-home parent. He was raised in Zillmere and attended Padua College. His brother, David, is a professor of epidemiology.

Purdie worked for the Queensland Police Service for 25 years. In his time with the police, he worked in the Australian Crime Commission, the Sunshine Coast Child Protection and Investigation Unit, and the State Homicide Squad.

== Political career ==
A redistribution ahead of the 2017 Queensland state election created the seat of Ninderry. Purdie was preselected by the LNP and won the seat eight points ahead of Labor candidate Bill Gissane. Following the resignation of Trevor Watts in 2020, Purdie became the Shadow Minister for Police.

After the LNP won a majority in the 2024 Queensland state election, Purdie was named the Minister for Police and Emergency Services.

== Personal life ==
Purdie is married to his wife, Andrea. The couple have two teenage daughters.

Parliament of Queensland
New seat	Member for Ninderry; 2017–present	Incumbent
