= Natalie Marr =

Australian politician

Natalie Marr MP

Assistant Minister for Finance, Trade, Employment and Training of Queensland
- Incumbent
- Assumed office 24 October 2026
- Minister: Ros Bates
- Premier: David Crisafulli
- Preceded by: Amanda Stoker

Member of the Queensland Legislative Assembly for Thuringowa
- Incumbent
- Assumed office 26 October 2024
- Preceded by: Aaron Harper

Personal details
- Party: Liberal National

Natalie Marr is an Australian politician. She was elected member of the Legislative Assembly of Queensland for Thuringowa in the 2024 Queensland state election. Marr was a councillor for the City of Townsville from 2008 to 2012.

Marr was born on 4 June 1969 in North Queensland. She attended St Joseph's Catholic School in Mundingburra.

In 2014, Marr was awarded the Volunteer of the Year for the Crime Stoppers Queensland Volunteer Service.
