= Steve Dickson =

Australian politician (born 1962)

The Honourable Steve Dickson
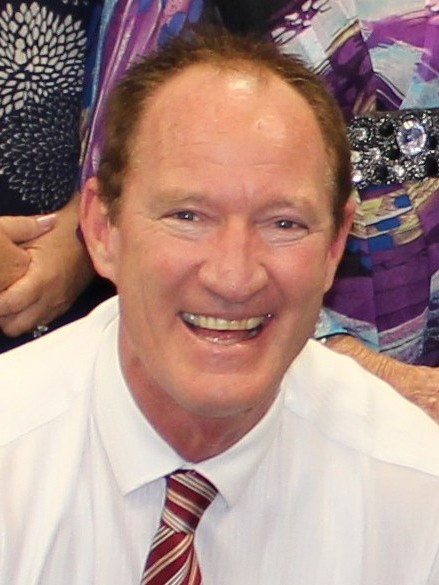
- Dickson in 2014

Leader of One Nation Queensland
- In office 23 January 2017 – 30 April 2019
- Deputy: Sam Cox
- Preceded by: Bill Flynn
- Succeeded by: James Ashby

Minister for National Parks, Recreation, Sport and Racing
- In office 3 April 2012 – 14 February 2015
- Premier: Campbell Newman
- Preceded by: Phil Reeves (Sport)
- Succeeded by: Steven Miles (National Parks); Bill Byrne (Sport and Racing)

Member of the Legislative Assembly for Buderim
- In office 21 March 2009 – 25 November 2017
- Preceded by: Electorate established
- Succeeded by: Brent Mickelberg

Member of the Legislative Assembly for Kawana
- In office 9 September 2006 – 21 March 2009
- Preceded by: Chris Cummins
- Succeeded by: Jarrod Bleijie

Local government
- 2000–2006: Member of Maroochy Shire

Personal details
- Born: Steven Lance Dickson; 24 June 1962 (age 64) Mount Morgan, Queensland Australia
- Party: Independent (since 2020); One Nation (2017–2019); Liberal National (2008–2017); Liberal (2006–2008)

Steven Lance Dickson (born 24 June 1962) is an Australian politician. He was a member of the Queensland Legislative Assembly beginning in 2006, representing the electorates of Kawana (2006–2009) and Buderim (2009–2017). First elected for the Liberal Party, he joined the Liberal National Party in the 2008 merger, but switched to Pauline Hanson's One Nation in January 2017. He subsequently lost his seat to the LNP candidate at the 2017 election. Dickson served as Minister for National Parks, Recreation, Sport and Racing in the Campbell Newman government from 2012 to 2015.

== Political career ==
Dickson was a small business owner until his election as a divisional councillor for Maroochy Shire in 2000. He acted as a chair for town planning and a board member of the combined Maroochy/Caloundra Water Board. In 2006 he entered state politics, taking the seat of Kawana and defeating sitting ALP member Chris Cummins with a 7% swing. He was a vocal supporter of a merger between the Liberal and National Parties. He was a member of the Liberal Party until the merger of the Liberal and National parties, whereupon he became a member of the Liberal National Party of Queensland. On 12 August 2008, he became Shadow Minister for Workplace and Job Security. In the 2009 state election, he transferred to the seat of Buderim. In 2011 he was appointed Shadow Minister for Energy and Water Utilities.

On 13 January 2017, Dickson announced that he had resigned from the Liberal National Party due to his conflict with the party over medical cannabis. He announced he would be joining Pauline Hanson's One Nation.

Following his announcement, the LNP advised it was investigating an allegation that Dickson had downloaded 52 internal documents from the party's secure site hours before his resignation from the party.

In the run up to the 2017 Queensland State elections, and in the presence of Pauline Hanson, Dickson erroneously stated about the Safe Schools program: "We are having little kids in grade four at school, young girls being taught by teachers how to masturbate, how to strap on dildos, how to do this sort of stuff — that is the real problem in this country." Queensland Premier Annastacia Palaszczuk immediately called those claims "absolutely atrocious" and "complete nonsense". Dickson went on to liken an adult sex shop (Cupids Cabin) to a "newsagency which can sell Playboy-style magazines".

He lost his seat to LNP candidate Brent Mickelberg at the 2017 election. Despite losing his seat, he remained the state leader of the party.

In August 2020, Dickson announced that he would run for his previous seat of Buderim in the upcoming 2020 Queensland election as an independent. He lost, coming in 4th place.

=== Electoral history ===
Queensland Legislative Assembly
Election year	Electorate	Party	Votes	FP%	+/-	2PP%	+/-	Result
2006	Kawana	Liberal	15,184	49.90	▲7.90	55.70	▲7.20	First
2009	Buderim	LNP	14,349	57.00	▲5.30	64.30	▲4.90	First
2012	Buderim	LNP	16,056	62.17	▲5.15	76.01	▲11.73	First
2015	Buderim	LNP	15,297	52.62	▼9.55	62.16	▼13.85	First
2017	Buderim	One Nation	8,452	28.60	▲28.60	N/A	N/A	Third
2020	Buderim	Independent	2,234	7.07	▲7.07	N/A	N/A	Fourth
2024	Nicklin	Independent	875	2.67	▲2.67	N/A	N/A	Seventh

== One Nation/National Rifle Association scandal ==
In March 2019, it was revealed that Dickson had been secretly captured on video with James Ashby (One Nation's Media Advisor) courting the National Rifle Association of America (NRA) seeking funds for Pauline Hanson's One Nation, with the promise to weaken Australia's gun laws if they gained the balance of power in the Australian parliament. Al Jazeera conducted a 3-year long operation to uncover this activity, by having a person called Rodger Muller pose as the head of a fake gun lobby group 'Gun Rights Australia', then having Muller record meetings he attended with Dickson and James Ashby, where strategies to seek support from the National Rifle Association and at least one of their large corporate benefactor were discussed. The footage from these meetings were used to produce an episode for Al Jazeera English, titled How to Sell a Massacre (part 1).

During Ashby and Dickson's meeting with NRA's Public Relations team, Lars Dalseide (NRA Media Liaison), suggests to Dickson tactics to use in the wake of any mass shootings in Australia. In reply to Dalseide's suggested line, "How dare you stand on the graves of those children and put forth your political agenda?" Dickson replies, "I love that." Dalseide; "If your policy isn’t good enough to stand on its own, how dare you use their deaths to push that forward?" Ashby; "That’s really good. That’s really strong." While meeting with the NRA, Dickson made derogatory remarks about Muslim immigrants to Australia, claiming they are criminals and killers; he called members of the Greens "fucktards".

Though both Ashby and Dickson declined Al Jazeera's invitation to comment on the footage, ABC news reported that, 'In a statement, Mr Ashby has accused Al Jazeera of being "a state-owned propaganda arm of the Qatari Government that supports Islamic extremist groups and are not a legitimate media organisation". "The matter has been referred to ASIO and the Australian Federal Police due to concerns of foreign interference into Australian politics in the lead-up to the imminent federal election." "It is understood One Nation was targeted because of its strong approach to reducing immigration numbers and a travel ban on countries with terrorism links." "One Nation strongly supports the rights of lawful gun ownership within Australia and have clearly outlined our policy on our website." "One Nation members have always complied with the law."

A further public statement was made by Ashby and Dickson on 26 March 2019, in which the pair excused themselves on the grounds of being drunk at the time.

Further footage was leaked of Dickson at a Washington, D.C. strip club attempting to solicit sexual favours, groping a dancer's breasts and making derogatory comments towards dancers and other women. In the video, from which excerpts were aired on Channel Nine's A Current Affair on 29 April 2019, Dickson is heard saying "I've done more Asian than I know what to do with."

In a statement the day after the broadcast, Dickson apologised for his behaviour and announced his resignation from One Nation.

== Personal life ==
Dickson's son Christian was also a politician.

Parliament of Queensland
Preceded by Chris Cummins	Member for Kawana; 2006–2009	Succeeded by Jarrod Bleijie
New seat	Member for Buderim; 2009–2017	Succeeded by Brent Mickelberg
