= Sam Cox (Australian politician) =

Australian politician (born 1964)

Member of the Queensland Parliament for Thuringowa
- In office 24 March 2012 – 31 January 2015
- Preceded by: Craig Wallace
- Succeeded by: Aaron Harper

Deputy Leader of One Nation Queensland
- In office 24 August 2017 – 30 April 2019
- Leader: Steve Dickson
- Succeeded by: Steve Andrew

Personal details
- Born: Samuel Victor Cox; 22 December 1964 (age 61) Home Hill, Queensland, Australia
- Party: Katter's Australian (2020–present)
- Other political affiliations: Independent (2019–2020); One Nation (2017–2019); Liberal National (2012–2017)
- Spouse: Janine Cox (m. 1992)
- Children: 3
- Education: Anglican Church Grammar School, Brisbane
- Alma mater: University of Queensland, Gatton Campus
- Occupation: Cane farmer (Self-employed)
- Profession: Grazier businessman

Samuel Victor Cox (born 22 December 1964) is an Australian former politician who was the member of the Legislative Assembly of Queensland for Thuringowa from 2012 to 2015.

Cox was educated at Anglican Church Grammar School.

He defected to Pauline Hanson's One Nation in January 2017, and announced that he would contest the next Queensland state election for One Nation in the seat of Burdekin, but was unsuccessful. Cox later unsuccessfully ran for mayor of Townsville in the 2020 local government elections. He contested the seat of Burdekin in the 2020 Queensland state election as a Katter's Australian Party candidate, and was again unsuccessful.

Parliament of Queensland
Preceded by Craig Wallace	Member for Thuringowa; 2012–2015	Succeeded by Aaron Harper
