= Brent Mickelberg =

Australian politician

The Honourable Brent Mickelberg MP
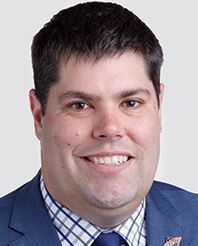

Minister for Transport and Main Roads of Queensland
- Incumbent
- Assumed office 1 November 2024
- Premier: David Crisafulli
- Preceded by: Bart Mellish

Member of the Queensland Legislative Assembly for Buderim
- Incumbent
- Assumed office 25 November 2017
- Preceded by: Steve Dickson

Personal details
- Born: 3 October 1981 (age 44) Brisbane, Queensland
- Party: Liberal National Party
- Spouse: Anneliese Mickelberg
- Children: Four

Brent Andrew Mickelberg (born 3 October 1981) is an Australian politician. He has been the Liberal National Party member for Buderim in the Queensland Legislative Assembly since 2017.

Mickelberg served in the Australian Army as an infantry officer. During that time, he deployed to East Timor, Afghanistan and worked on border protection operations.

Parliament of Queensland
Preceded by Steve Dickson	Member for Buderim; 2017–present	Incumbent
