= Aaron Harper (politician) =

Australian politician

Aaron Harper MP

Member of the Queensland Legislative Assembly for Thuringowa
- In office 31 January 2015 – 26 October 2024
- Preceded by: Sam Cox
- Succeeded by: Natalie Marr

Personal details
- Born: 20 May 1967 (age 59) Auckland, New Zealand
- Party: Labor
- Website: www.aaronharper.com.au

Aaron David Harper (born 20 May 1967) is an Australian politician. He served as the Labor member for Thuringowa in the Queensland Legislative Assembly from 2015 until his defeat at the 2024 state election.

Parliament of Queensland
| Preceded by Sam Cox | Member for Thuringowa; 2015–2024 | Succeeded by Natalie Marr |
