= Legalise Cannabis Queensland =

Political party in Queensland, Australia

Legalise Cannabis Queensland Party
- Abbreviation: LCQ
- President: Melody Lindsay
- Secretary: Suzette Luyken
- Founded: 1 September 2020
- Headquarters: Nambour Qld
- Ideology: Legalisation of cannabis
- National affiliation: Legalise Cannabis Australia
- Queensland Parliament: 0 / 93

Website
- https://lcqparty.org/

Legalise Cannabis Queensland, registered with the Electoral Commission Queensland as Legalise Cannabis Queensland (Party), is a single-issue political party based in Queensland, Australia. The party has a number of policies that centre around the adult legalisation and regulation of cannabis for personal, medical and industrial uses.

The party was formed in 2020, and ran 23 candidates in the Queensland state election in that year. They received over 26,000 votes and 0.91% of the total first preference votes statwide, gaining over 5% of the vote in some areas and 3 to 4% in others, Ian Zunker received the party's biggest share of first preference votes in the state, with 5.51% in the electorate of Bundaberg. The party finished as the sixth largest party by number of votes out of the twelve parties that contested the election.

== Formation ==
The Legalise Cannabis Queensland Party was established when a group of like minded people containing members from the H.E.M.P. Party, Medical Cannabis Users Association of Australia (MCUA) and their associated networks formed a Facebook group with the intention of standing as independents in the October 2020 Queensland state election with the view of working loosely together to push for cannabis law reform in Queensland and share resources. They met in person on several occasions to discuss issues and policy. Then one person suggested maybe a political party would be a better way. The party met the membership requirements for registration within a fortnight and on 1 July 2020 they submitted registration paperwork to the Electoral Commission of Queensland to run candidates at the October Queensland state election. The party was registered as a political party by ECQ on 9 September 2020.

== Election results ==
=== Queensland ===
Election	Legislative Assembly of Queensland				
Election	Votes	%	+/–	Seats	+/–
2020	26,146	0.91%	New	0 / 89	New
2024	49,552	1.6%	+0.7	0 / 89	Steady

=== Federal ===
Election	Queensland House seats				Queensland Senate seats				
Election	Votes	%	Seats	+/–	Votes	%	Seats won	Total seats	+/–
2022	6,025	0.20%	0 / 25	New	161,899	5.37%	0 / 6	0 / 12	New

== See also ==
- Cannabis in Australia
- Drug policy reform
- Legalise Cannabis Australia
- Legalise Cannabis Western Australia Party
