= Craig Wallace (politician) =

Australian politician

The Hon Craig Wallace
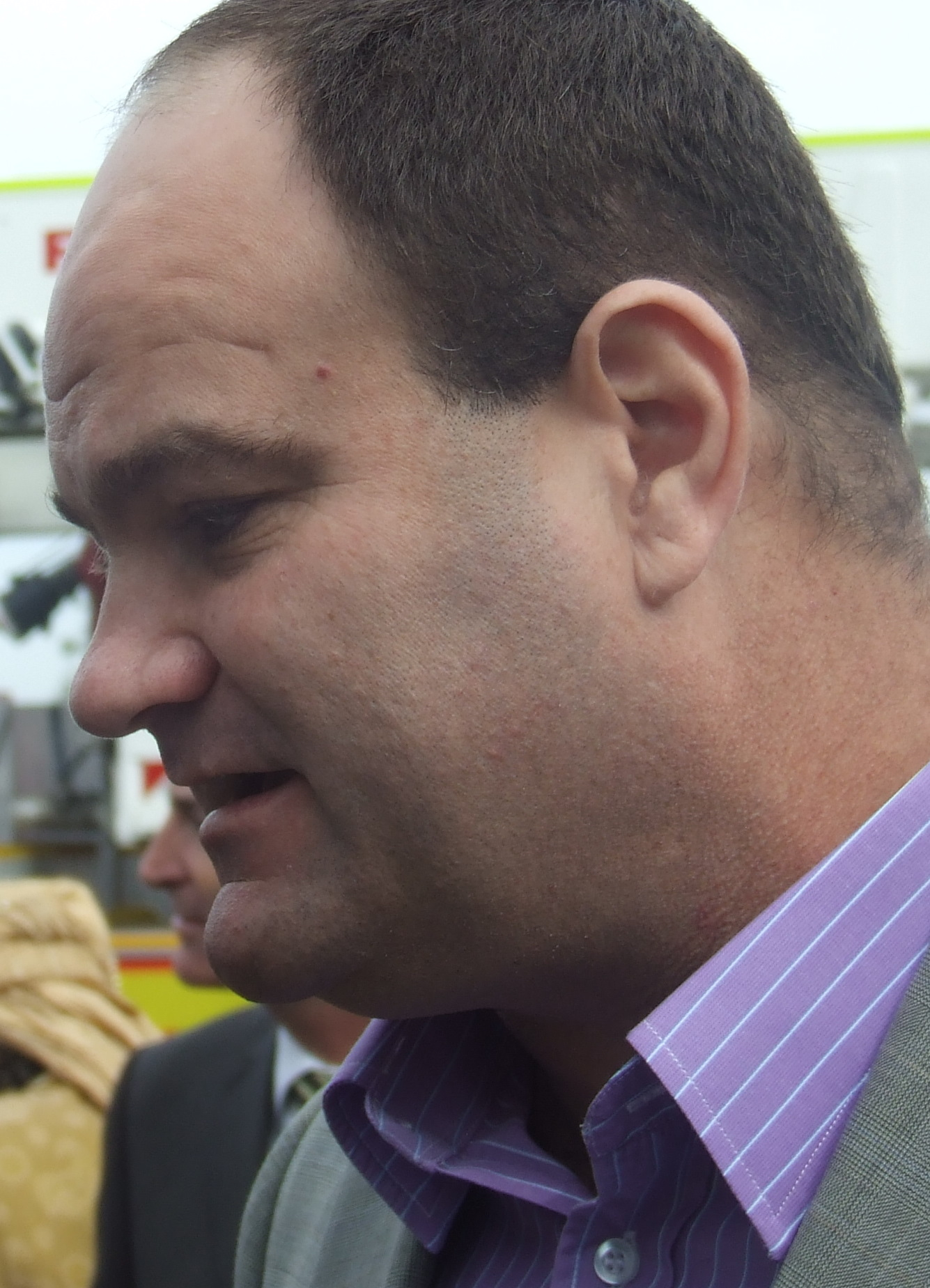

Minister for Fisheries and Marine Infrastructure of Queensland
- In office 21 February 2011 – 26 March 2012
- Preceded by: Robert Schwarten (as Fisheries)
- Succeeded by: John McVeigh (as Fisheries)
- Constituency: Thuringowa

Minister for Main Roads of Queensland
- In office 26 March 2009 – 26 March 2012
- Preceded by: Warren Pitt
- Succeeded by: Scott Emerson
- Constituency: Thuringowa

Minister for Natural Resources and Water of Queensland
- In office 1 November 2006 – 26 March 2009
- Preceded by: Kerry Shine
- Succeeded by: Stephen Robertson (as Natural Resources)
- Constituency: Thuringowa

Member of the Queensland Legislative Assembly for Thuringowa
- In office 7 February 2004 – 24 March 2012
- Preceded by: Anita Phillips
- Succeeded by: Sam Cox

Personal details
- Born: Craig Andrew Wallace; 12 June 1969 (age 57) Home Hill, Queensland, Australia
- Party: Labor
- Spouse: Jennifer Teo-Wallace
- Children: Gigi Wallace, Lolo Wallace
- Education: James Cook University
- Occupation: Executive Officer

Craig Andrew Wallace (born 12 June 1969) is an Australian politician. He was the member for Thuringowa in the Queensland State Parliament from 7 February 2004 to 24 March 2012.

He was the Minister for Main Roads and Fisheries and Marine Infrastructure until Labor lost the 2012 state election. He was defeated after falling into third place behind Katter's Australian Party nominee Steve Todeschini.

He previously served as Minister for Natural Resources and Water and Minister Assisting the Premier in North Queensland.

Parliament of Queensland
Preceded by Anita Phillips	Member for Thuringowa; 2004–2012	Succeeded by Sam Cox
