= Results of the 2009 Queensland state election =

Parliament of Queensland, Assembly election, 21 March 2009 Legislative Assembly << 2006–2012 >>
Enrolled voters	2,660,940				
Votes cast	2,419,559		Turnout	90.93	+0.46
Informal votes	46,908		Informal	1.94	–0.14
Summary of votes by party
Party	Primary votes	%	Swing	Seats	Change
Labor	1,002,415	42.25	–4.67	51	–8
Liberal National	987,018	41.60	+3.68	34	+9
Greens	198,475	8.37	+0.38	0	±0
Daylight Saving for South East Queensland	22,170	0.93	+0.93	0	±0
Family First	19,379	0.82	–1.07	0	±0
One Nation	9,038	0.38	–0.22	0	–1
Socialist Alliance	705	0.03	+0.03	0	±0
Independent	133,451	5.62	+0.97	4	±0
Total	2,372,651			89	

This is a list of electoral district results for the Queensland 2009 election.

== Results by electoral district ==
=== Albert ===
2009 Queensland state election: Albert
Party	Candidate	Votes	%	±%
Labor	Margaret Keech	12,649	49.98	−7.2
Liberal National	Andrea Johanson	9,841	38.89	+7.4
Greens	Marlee Bruinsma	1,792	7.08	−0.2
Independent	Geoff Flannery	1,024	4.05	+4.0
Total formal votes		25,306	97.50	+0.4
Informal votes		648	2.50	–0.4
Turnout		25,954	90.30	
Two-party-preferred result
Labor	Margaret Keech	13,409	56.47	−7.3
Liberal National	Andrea Johanson	10,335	43.53	+7.3
Labor hold		Swing	−7.3	

=== Algester ===
2009 Queensland state election: Algester
Party	Candidate	Votes	%	±%
Labor	Karen Struthers	13,600	52.6	−8.2
Liberal National	Anthony Shorten	9,174	35.5	+7.4
Greens	Stan Cajdler	1,920	7.4	−1.9
Family First	Steve Christian	1,147	4.4	+2.7
Total formal votes		25,841	97.7	−0.1
Informal votes		606	2.3	+0.1
Turnout		26,447	91.8	
Two-party-preferred result
Labor	Karen Struthers	14,451	59.2	−8.6
Liberal National	Anthony Shorten	9,956	40.8	+8.6
Labor hold		Swing	−8.6	

=== Ashgrove ===
2009 Queensland state election: Ashgrove
Party	Candidate	Votes	%	±%
Labor	Kate Jones	12,629	45.7	−1.9
Liberal National	Scott McConnel	10,293	37.3	+1.4
Greens	Robert Hogg	3,425	12.4	−3.4
Independent	Ian Saunders	799	2.9	+2.9
DS4SEQ	Bill Grieve	355	1.3	+1.3
Independent	Ruth Spencer	127	0.5	+0.5
Total formal votes		27,628	98.7	+0.3
Informal votes		339	1.3	−0.3
Turnout		27,967	91.6	
Two-party-preferred result
Labor	Kate Jones	14,842	57.1	−1.4
Liberal National	Scott McConnel	11,153	42.9	+1.4
Labor hold		Swing	−1.4	

=== Aspley ===
2009 Queensland state election: Aspley
Party	Candidate	Votes	%	±%
Liberal National	Tracy Davis	13,400	50.0	+7.1
Labor	Bonny Barry	10,940	40.8	−7.0
Greens	Peter Jeremijenko	1,836	6.8	+0.2
Family First	Allan Vincent	633	2.4	+1.6
Total formal votes		26,809	98.4	
Informal votes		407	1.6	
Turnout		27,216	93.1	
Two-party-preferred result
Liberal National	Tracy Davis	14,083	54.5	+7.5
Labor	Bonny Barry	11,775	45.5	−7.5
Liberal National gain from Labor		Swing	+7.5	

=== Barron River ===
2009 Queensland state election: Barron River
Party	Candidate	Votes	%	±%
Liberal National	Wendy Richardson	12,025	43.8	+8.6
Labor	Steve Wettenhall	11,864	43.2	+1.9
Greens	Sarah Isaacs	3,545	12.9	−0.8
Total formal votes		27,434	97.1	
Informal votes		689	2.9	
Turnout		28,123	89.6	
Two-party-preferred result
Labor	Steve Wettenhall	13,742	52.3	−2.4
Liberal National	Wendy Richardson	12,522	47.7	+2.4
Labor hold		Swing	−2.4	

=== Beaudesert ===
2009 Queensland state election: Beaudesert
Party	Candidate	Votes	%	±%
Liberal National	Aidan McLindon	10,700	37.9	−12.6
Labor	Brett McCreadie	7,012	24.8	−13.3
Independent	Pauline Hanson	5,998	21.2	+21.2
Independent	Keith Gee	2,191	7.8	+7.8
Greens	Andy Grodecki	1,970	7.0	−4.4
DS4SEQ	Russell Pata	193	0.7	+0.7
Independent	Richard Somers	166	0.6	+0.6
Total formal votes		28,230	98.1	
Informal votes		498	1.9	
Turnout		28,728	92.2	
Two-party-preferred result
Liberal National	Aidan McLindon	12,418	58.3	+2.4
Labor	Brett McCreadie	8,879	41.7	−2.4
Liberal National hold		Swing	+2.4	

=== Brisbane Central ===
2009 Queensland state election: Brisbane Central
Party	Candidate	Votes	%	±%
Labor	Grace Grace	10,238	42.2	−7.7
Liberal National	Mark Wood	9,042	37.2	+8.1
Greens	Anne Boccabella	4,129	17.0	−1.5
DS4SEQ	Adrian Miller	873	3.6	+3.6
Total formal votes		24,282	98.3	
Informal votes		371	1.7	
Turnout		24,653	86.4	
Two-party-preferred result
Labor	Grace Grace	12,548	56.0	−8.4
Liberal National	Mark Wood	9,870	44.0	+8.4
Labor hold		Swing	−8.4	

=== Broadwater ===
2009 Queensland state election: Broadwater
Party	Candidate	Votes	%	±%
Labor	Peta-Kaye Croft	12,090	46.8	−5.5
Liberal National	Richard Towson	11,345	43.9	+3.9
Greens	Graeme Maizey	1,289	5.0	−0.3
DS4SEQ	Ben Monaghan	646	2.5	+2.5
Independent	Rohan Turnley	458	1.8	+1.8
Total formal votes		25,828	97.7	
Informal votes		562	2.3	
Turnout		26,390	88.7	
Two-party-preferred result
Labor	Peta-Kaye Croft	12,829	52.0	−4.6
Liberal National	Richard Towson	11,829	48.0	+4.6
Labor hold		Swing	−4.6	

=== Buderim ===
2009 Queensland state election: Buderim
Party	Candidate	Votes	%	±%
Liberal National	Steve Dickson	14,349	57.0	+5.3
Labor	Laura Hawkins	7,410	29.4	−4.6
Greens	Danny Stevens	2,075	8.2	−3.7
DS4SEQ	Neil Heyme	719	2.9	+2.9
Family First	Cathy Turner	611	2.4	+2.4
Total formal votes		25,164	98.1	
Informal votes		425	1.9	
Turnout		25,589	90.9	
Two-party-preferred result
Liberal National	Steve Dickson	15,120	64.3	+4.9
Labor	Laura Hawkins	8,402	35.7	−4.9
Liberal National hold		Swing	+4.9	

=== Bulimba ===
2009 Queensland state election: Bulimba
Party	Candidate	Votes	%	±%
Labor	Di Farmer	13,131	47.7	−9.6
Liberal National	Paul Walker	10,197	37.1	+7.3
Greens	Angela Dean	3,202	11.6	+0.2
DS4SEQ	Angela Wright	976	3.5	+3.5
Total formal votes		27,506	98.2	
Informal votes		436	11.6	
Turnout		27,942	90.0	
Two-party-preferred result
Labor	Di Farmer	14,968	57.8	−8.3
Liberal National	Paul Walker	10,940	42.2	+8.3
Labor hold		Swing	−8.3	

=== Bundaberg ===
2009 Queensland state election: Bundaberg
Party	Candidate	Votes	%	±%
Liberal National	Jack Dempsey	14,594	53.7	+9.0
Labor	Phil Freeman	11,297	41.6	−3.1
Greens	Erin Hall	1,281	4.7	+0.8
Total formal votes		27,172	98.0	
Informal votes		527	2.0	
Turnout		27,699	91.80	
Two-party-preferred result
Liberal National	Jack Dempsey	14,851	56.0	+5.0
Labor	Phil Freeman	11,660	44.0	−5.0
Liberal National hold		Swing	+5.0	

=== Bundamba ===
2009 Queensland state election: Bundamba
Party	Candidate	Votes	%	±%
Labor	Jo-Ann Miller	15,470	61.3	−7.5
Liberal National	Simon Ingram	5,846	23.2	+1.6
Greens	Ric Nattrass	1,808	7.2	−0.7
Independent	Patricia Petersen	1,026	4.1	+4.1
Family First	Bevan Smith	666	2.6	+2.6
DS4SEQ	Cameron Hodges	411	1.6	+1.6
Total formal votes		25,227	97.1	
Informal votes		621	2.9	
Turnout		25,848	90.5	
Two-party-preferred result
Labor	Jo-Ann Miller	16,559	71.2	−4.0
Liberal National	Simon Ingram	6,687	28.8	+4.0
Labor hold		Swing	−4.0	

=== Burdekin ===
2009 Queensland state election: Burdekin
Party	Candidate	Votes	%	±%
Liberal National	Rosemary Menkens	13,438	50.5	+5.2
Labor	Les Walker	11,648	43.8	−3.4
Greens	Maria Macdonald	1,532	5.8	+1.8
Total formal votes		26,618	98.1	
Informal votes		489	1.9	
Turnout		27,107	91.4	
Two-party-preferred result
Liberal National	Rosemary Menkens	13,705	53.1	+4.0
Labor	Les Walker	12,082	46.9	−4.0
Liberal National gain from Labor		Swing	+4.0	

=== Burleigh ===
2009 Queensland state election: Burleigh
Party	Candidate	Votes	%	±%
Labor	Christine Smith	12,637	46.8	−6.1
Liberal National	Michael Hart	10,498	38.9	+1.6
Greens	Anja Light	2,065	7.6	−2.2
DS4SEQ	Bryden Elssmann	807	3.0	+2.5
Family First	Jeremy Fredericks	516	1.9	+1.9
Independent	Ray Sperring	476	1.8	+1.8
Total formal votes		26,999	97.6	
Informal votes		603	2.4	
Turnout		27,602	88.9	
Two-party-preferred result
Labor	Christine Smith	13,733	54.9	−3.9
Liberal National	Michael Hart	11,281	45.1	+3.9
Labor hold		Swing	−3.9	

=== Burnett ===
2009 Queensland state election: Burnett
Party	Candidate	Votes	%	±%
Liberal National	Rob Messenger	15,055	56.6	−0.8
Labor	Chris Pianta	9,206	34.6	−7.9
Greens	Bernie Williams	1,324	5.0	+5.0
Independent	Peter Wyatt	760	2.9	+2.9
Independent	Robert Bromwich	232	0.9	+0.9
Total formal votes		26,577	97.9	
Informal votes		524	2.1	
Turnout		27,101	92.1	
Two-party-preferred result
Liberal National	Rob Messenger	15,432	61.1	+3.7
Labor	Chris Pianta	9,824	38.9	−3.7
Liberal National hold		Swing	+3.7	

=== Cairns ===
2009 Queensland state election: Cairns
Party	Candidate	Votes	%	±%
Labor	Desley Boyle	12,309	45.8	−3.5
Liberal National	Joel Harrop	10,689	39.8	+5.5
Greens	Steve Brech	2,947	11.0	+2.8
Family First	Janice Skipp	943	3.5	+3.5
Total formal votes		26,888	97.4	
Informal votes		663	2.6	
Turnout		27,551	86.8	
Two-party-preferred result
Labor	Desley Boyle	13,641	54.2	−3.8
Liberal National	Joel Harrop	11,548	45.8	+3.8
Labor hold		Swing	−3.8	

=== Callide ===
2009 Queensland state election: Callide
Party	Candidate	Votes	%	±%
Liberal National	Jeff Seeney	16,365	59.0	−11.2
Labor	David Pullen	6,636	23.9	−5.6
Independent	Clare Mildren	3,680	13.3	+13.3
Greens	Camilla Percy	1,064	3.8	+3.8
Total formal votes		27,745	98.5	
Informal votes		397	1.5	
Turnout		28,142	92.9	
Two-party-preferred result
Liberal National	Jeff Seeney	17,537	69.4	−1.0
Labor	David Pullen	7,746	30.6	+1.0
Liberal National hold		Swing	−1.0	

=== Caloundra ===
2009 Queensland state election: Caloundra
Party	Candidate	Votes	%	±%
Liberal National	Mark McArdle	12,697	50.1	+4.0
Labor	Jody Tunnicliffe	9,348	36.9	−4.8
Greens	Roger Callen	2,444	9.6	−0.9
DS4SEQ	John Fogarty	519	2.0	+2.0
Independent	Mike Jessop	358	1.4	+1.4
Total formal votes		25,366	97.9	
Informal votes		295	2.1	
Turnout		25,861	91.1	
Two-party-preferred result
Liberal National	Mark McArdle	13,277	56.2	+4.3
Labor	Jody Tunnicliffe	10,348	43.8	−4.3
Liberal National hold		Swing	+4.3	

=== Capalaba ===
2009 Queensland state election: Capalaba
Party	Candidate	Votes	%	±%
Labor	Michael Choi	15,286	53.3	−4.2
Liberal National	Paul Gleeson	10,591	36.9	+6.5
Greens	Chad Kirby	2,817	9.8	−1.3
Total formal votes		28,694	97.8	
Informal votes		605	2.2	
Turnout		29,299	92.69	
Two-party-preferred result
Labor	Michael Choi	16,354	59.7	−5.1
Liberal National	Paul Gleeson	11,055	40.3	+5.1
Labor hold		Swing	−5.1	

=== Chatsworth ===
2009 Queensland state election: Chatsworth
Party	Candidate	Votes	%	±%
Liberal National	Andrea Caltabiano	12,760	45.0	−1.7
Labor	Steve Kilburn	12,431	43.9	−1.0
Greens	Jason Cooney	1,996	7.0	−1.2
DS4SEQ	Jason Furze	799	2.8	+2.8
Independent	Tony Zegenhagen	347	1.2	+1.2
Total formal votes		28,333	98.0	
Informal votes		507	2.0	
Turnout		28,840	92.9	
Two-party-preferred result
Labor	Steve Kilburn	13,561	50.1	+0.0
Liberal National	Andrea Caltabiano	13,487	49.9	-0.0
Labor hold		Swing	+0.0	

=== Clayfield ===
2009 Queensland state election: Clayfield
Party	Candidate	Votes	%	±%
Liberal National	Tim Nicholls	13,784	49.2	+5.1
Labor	Joff Lelliott	10,230	36.5	−4.7
Greens	Andrew Jeremijenko	2,988	10.7	−0.1
DS4SEQ	Randle Thomas	560	2.0	+2.0
Family First	Brendan Wong	433	1.5	+1.5
Total formal votes		27,995	98.5	
Informal votes		384	1.5	
Turnout		28,379	91.2	
Two-party-preferred result
Liberal National	Tim Nicholls	14,738	55.8	+6.1
Labor	Joff Lelliott	11,656	44.2	−6.1
Liberal National hold		Swing	+6.1	

=== Cleveland ===
2009 Queensland state election: Cleveland
Party	Candidate	Votes	%	±%
Liberal National	Mark Robinson	13,199	46.0	+5.3
Labor	Phil Weightman	12,502	43.6	+0.2
Greens	Carissa Patchett	2,016	7.0	−1.3
DS4SEQ	Richard Jemison	968	3.4	+3.4
Total formal votes		28,685	98.0	
Informal votes		517	2.0	
Turnout		29,202	92.6	
Two-party-preferred result
Liberal National	Mark Robinson	13,846	50.3	+1.5
Labor	Phil Weightman	13,691	49.7	−1.5
Liberal National gain from Labor		Swing	+1.5	

=== Condamine ===
2009 Queensland state election: Condamine
Party	Candidate	Votes	%	±%
Liberal National	Ray Hopper	14,360	47.7	−11.6
Independent	Stuart Copeland	7,664	25.4	+25.4
Labor	Tracey Harris	5,917	19.6	−7.1
Greens	Craig Sheehan	1,009	3.3	+1.3
One Nation	Rod Watson	860	2.9	+2.9
Independent	Stephanie Bugg	323	1.1	+1.1
Total formal votes		30,133	98.3	
Informal votes		490	1.7	
Turnout		30,623	93.73	
Two-candidate-preferred result
Liberal National	Ray Hopper	15,200	61.6	−7.1
Independent	Stuart Copeland	9,491	38.4	+38.4
Liberal National hold		Swing	−7.1	

=== Cook ===
2009 Queensland state election: Cook
Party	Candidate	Votes	%	±%
Labor	Jason O'Brien	10,456	46.0	−4.3
Liberal National	Craig Batchelor	9,629	42.4	+12.7
Greens	Neville St John-Wood	1,510	6.7	−0.3
Independent	Michaelangelo Newie	1,111	4.9	+4.9
Total formal votes		22,706	98.1	
Informal votes		417	1.9	
Turnout		23,123	85.8	
Two-party-preferred result
Labor	Jason O'Brien	11,217	52.2	−9.2
Liberal National	Craig Batchelor	10,253	47.8	+9.2
Labor hold		Swing	−9.2	

=== Coomera ===
2009 Queensland state election: Coomera
Party	Candidate	Votes	%	±%
Liberal National	Michael Crandon	11,840	47.1	+9.5
Labor	Leeanne Enoch	10,761	42.8	−10.3
Greens	Petrina Maizey	1,545	6.1	+0.3
DS4SEQ	Russell Anderson	977	3.9	+3.9
Total formal votes		25,123	96.9	
Informal votes		650	3.1	
Turnout		25,773	89.6	
Two-party-preferred result
Liberal National	Michael Crandon	12,404	51.9	+10.2
Labor	Leeanne Enoch	11,489	48.1	−10.2
Liberal National gain from Labor		Swing	+10.2	

=== Currumbin ===
2009 Queensland state election: Currumbin
Party	Candidate	Votes	%	±%
Liberal National	Jann Stuckey	13,790	51.1	+3.2
Labor	Michael Riordan	9,876	36.6	−6.1
Greens	Inge Light	2,484	9.2	−0.2
DS4SEQ	Jason Hockings	850	3.1	+3.1
Total formal votes		27,000	98.1	
Informal votes		504	1.9	
Turnout		27,504	89.0	
Two-party-preferred result
Liberal National	Jann Stuckey	14,551	56.9	+4.7
Labor	Michael Riordan	11,025	43.1	−4.7
Liberal National hold		Swing	+4.7	

=== Dalrymple ===
2009 Queensland state election: Dalrymple
Party	Candidate	Votes	%	±%
Liberal National	Shane Knuth	10,597	41.4	+6.5
One Nation	Rosa Lee Long	8,178	32.0	−0.5
Labor	Jason Briskey	5,668	22.2	−6.7
Greens	Glenn Martin	809	3.2	+0.8
Independent	Adrienne Freeman	248	1.0	+1.0
Independent	Harrison Duncan	87	0.3	+0.3
Total formal votes		25.587	98.7	
Informal votes		314	1.3	
Turnout		25,901	91.4	
Two-candidate-preferred result
Liberal National	Shane Knuth	11,517	55.2	−2.5
One Nation	Rosa Lee Long	9,355	44.8	+44.8
Liberal National hold		Swing	−2.5	

=== Everton ===
2009 Queensland state election: Everton
Party	Candidate	Votes	%	±%
Labor	Murray Watt	12,304	44.4	−8.4
Liberal National	Troy Knox	12,229	44.1	+11.0
Greens	Bruce Hallett	2,513	9.1	+1.1
DS4SEQ	Anthony Vella	674	2.4	+2.4
Total formal votes		27,720	98.3	
Informal votes		460	1.7	
Turnout		28,180	93.3	
Two-party-preferred result
Labor	Murray Watt	13,605	51.4	−9.2
Liberal National	Troy Knox	12,870	48.6	+9.2
Labor hold		Swing	−9.2	

=== Ferny Grove ===
2009 Queensland state election: Ferny Grove
Party	Candidate	Votes	%	±%
Labor	Geoff Wilson	12,325	44.3	−7.1
Liberal National	Dale Shuttleworth	10,941	39.3	+9.4
Greens	Howard Nielsen	3,884	13.9	+2.3
Family First	Mark White	698	2.5	−4.6
Total formal votes		27,848	98.4	
Informal votes		401	1.6	
Turnout		28,249	93.1	
Two-party-preferred result
Labor	Geoff Wilson	14,309	54.5	−7.6
Liberal National	Dale Shuttleworth	11,950	45.5	+7.6
Labor hold		Swing	−7.6	

=== Gaven ===
2009 Queensland state election: Gaven
Party	Candidate	Votes	%	±%
Liberal National	Alex Douglas	11,184	41.9	−0.1
Labor	Phil Gray	10,617	39.8	−7.3
Greens	Sally Spain	1,870	7.0	−1.5
Independent	David Montgomery	1,656	6.2	+6.2
Family First	Derek Radke	700	2.6	+0.3
Independent	Ramiah Selwood	646	2.4	+2.4
Total formal votes		26,673	96.8	
Informal votes		754	3.2	
Turnout		27,427	90.2	
Two-party-preferred result
Liberal National	Alex Douglas	12,003	50.7	+3.9
Labor	Phil Gray	11,661	49.3	−3.9
Liberal National gain from Labor		Swing	+3.9	

=== Gladstone ===
2009 Queensland state election: Gladstone
Party	Candidate	Votes	%	±%
Independent	Liz Cunningham	15,255	54.6	+7.2
Labor	Peter O'Sullivan	11,903	42.6	−3.8
Greens	Kirsten Neilson	760	2.7	+2.7
Total formal votes		27,918	98.5	
Informal votes		377	1.5	
Turnout		28,295	92.1	
Two-candidate-preferred result
Independent	Liz Cunningham	15,458	56.1	+4.1
Labor	Peter O'Sullivan	12,084	43.9	−4.1
Independent hold		Swing	+4.1	

=== Glass House ===
2009 Queensland state election: Glass House
Party	Candidate	Votes	%	±%
Liberal National	Andrew Powell	13,009	48.6	+15.0
Labor	Jenny Hansen Read	9,035	33.8	−2.3
Greens	Jenny Fitzgibbon	4,713	17.6	+8.0
Total formal votes		26,757	97.7	
Informal votes		545	2.3	
Turnout		27,302	92.2	
Two-party-preferred result
Liberal National	Andrew Powell	13,860	55.8	+5.8
Labor	Jenny Hansen Read	10,975	44.2	−5.8
Liberal National gain from Labor		Swing	+5.8	

=== Greenslopes ===
2009 Queensland state election: Greenslopes
Party	Candidate	Votes	%	±%
Labor	Cameron Dick	12,450	46.3	−5.0
Liberal National	Ian Kaye	10,172	37.8	+4.5
Greens	Darryl Rosin	3,382	12.6	+0.5
DS4SEQ	Brad Armstrong	455	1.7	+1.7
Independent	Doug Russell	444	1.7	+1.7
Total formal votes		26,903	98.3	
Informal votes		442	1.7	
Turnout		27,345	91.5	
Two-party-preferred result
Labor	Cameron Dick	14,368	56.9	−4.3
Liberal National	Ian Kaye	10,864	43.1	+4.3
Labor hold		Swing	−4.3	

=== Gregory ===
2009 Queensland state election: Gregory
Party	Candidate	Votes	%	±%
Liberal National	Vaughan Johnson	14,054	61.8	+5.5
Labor	Fabian Webber	7,619	33.5	−1.2
Greens	Carla Dalton	1,063	4.7	+4.7
Total formal votes		22,736	98.6	
Informal votes		306	1.4	
Turnout		23,042	91.8	
Two-party-preferred result
Liberal National	Vaughan Johnson	14,260	64.3	+2.3
Labor	Fabian Webber	7,932	35.7	−2.3
Liberal National hold		Swing	+2.3	

=== Gympie ===
2009 Queensland state election: Gympie
Party	Candidate	Votes	%	±%
Liberal National	David Gibson	16,612	60.6	+14.7
Labor	Daniel Tabone	4,013	14.6	+2.9
Independent	Elisa Roberts	3,928	14.3	+5.3
Greens	Kent Hutton	2,847	10.4	+1.8
Total formal votes		27,400	97.6	
Informal votes		599	2.4	
Turnout		27,999	92.1	
Two-party-preferred result
Liberal National	David Gibson	18,057	77.2	+5.2
Labor	Daniel Tabone	5,331	22.8	−5.2
Liberal National hold		Swing	+5.2	

=== Hervey Bay ===
2009 Queensland state election: Hervey Bay
Party	Candidate	Votes	%	±%
Liberal National	Ted Sorensen	14,396	50.4	+13.8
Labor	Andrew McNamara	11,047	38.6	−3.0
Independent	Peter Schuback	1,353	4.7	−1.1
Greens	Paul Brown	1,278	4.5	−2.5
DS4SEQ	Jason Powning	510	1.8	+1.8
Total formal votes		28,584	98.0	
Informal votes		524	2.0	
Turnout		29,108	91.3	
Two-party-preferred result
Liberal National	Ted Sorensen	15,251	56.5	+8.6
Labor	Andrew McNamara	11,741	43.5	−8.6
Liberal National gain from Labor		Swing	+8.6	

=== Hinchinbrook ===
2009 Queensland state election: Hinchinbrook
Party	Candidate	Votes	%	±%
Liberal National	Andrew Cripps	14,551	58.0	+10.1
Labor	Mark Platt	7,433	29.6	−14.5
Independent	Raymond Thompson	1,712	6.8	+6.8
Greens	Michelle Macklin	1,409	5.6	−0.6
Total formal votes		25,105	97.5	
Informal votes		570	2.5	
Turnout		25,675	91.5	
Two-party-preferred result
Liberal National	Andrew Cripps	15,044	64.7	+12.7
Labor	Mark Platt	8,212	35.3	−12.7
Liberal National hold		Swing	+12.7	

=== Inala ===
2009 Queensland state election: Inala
Party	Candidate	Votes	%	±%
Labor	Annastacia Palaszczuk	16,746	64.0	−5.3
Liberal National	Leo Perkins	6,212	23.7	+2.8
Greens	Alan Maizey	2,104	8.0	−1.7
Family First	Felicity Ryan	1,124	4.3	+4.3
Total formal votes		26,186	97.5	
Informal votes		633	2.5	
Turnout		26,819	91.6	
Two-party-preferred result
Labor	Annastacia Palaszczuk	17,779	71.5	−4.5
Liberal National	Leo Perkins	7,077	28.5	+4.5
Labor hold		Swing	−4.5	

=== Indooroopilly ===
2009 Queensland state election: Indooroopilly
Party	Candidate	Votes	%	±%
Liberal National	Scott Emerson	11,570	44.5	+2.3
Labor	Sarah Warner	6,907	26.5	−14.4
Greens	Ronan Lee	6,749	25.9	+9.0
DS4SEQ	John Burkett	802	3.1	+3.1
Total formal votes		26,028	98.9	
Informal votes		274	1.1	
Turnout		26,302	90.6	
Two-party-preferred result
Liberal National	Scott Emerson	12,891	55.9	+8.6
Labor	Sarah Warner	10,184	44.1	−8.6
Liberal National gain from Greens		Swing	+8.6	

=== Ipswich ===
2009 Queensland state election: Ipswich
Party	Candidate	Votes	%	±%
Labor	Rachel Nolan	16,598	60.2	−5.8
Liberal National	Suzie Holmes	8,018	29.1	+3.2
Greens	Peter Luxton	1,848	6.7	−1.3
Family First	Elwyn Denman	1,125	4.1	+4.1
Total formal votes		27,589	97.9	
Informal votes		545	2.1	
Turnout		28,134	92.5	
Two-party-preferred result
Labor	Rachel Nolan	17,581	66.7	−4.7
Liberal National	Suzie Holmes	8,774	33.3	+4.7
Labor hold		Swing	−4.7	

=== Ipswich West ===
2009 Queensland state election: Ipswich West
Party	Candidate	Votes	%	±%
Labor	Wayne Wendt	14,518	54.0	−0.2
Liberal National	Sean Choat	10,047	37.4	+6.1
Greens	Di Clark	2,327	8.7	+1.7
Total formal votes		26,892	97.9	
Informal votes		516	2.1	
Turnout		27,408	93.0	
Two-party-preferred result
Labor	Wayne Wendt	15,370	59.5	−3.2
Liberal National	Sean Choat	10,442	40.5	+3.2
Labor hold		Swing	−3.2	

=== Kallangur ===
2009 Queensland state election: Kallangur
Party	Candidate	Votes	%	±%
Labor	Mary-Anne O'Neill	11,871	47.0	−6.7
Liberal National	Trevor Ruthenberg	10,717	39.4	+6.0
Greens	Craig Graham	2,193	8.7	−1.5
Family First	Alan Revie	801	3.2	+3.2
DS4SEQ	Mark McDowell	434	1.7	+1.7
Total formal votes		25,254	97.5	
Informal votes		602	2.5	
Turnout		25,856	92.3	
Two-party-preferred result
Labor	Mary-Anne O'Neill	12,904	54.6	−6.4
Liberal National	Trevor Ruthenberg	10,717	45.4	+6.4
Labor hold		Swing	−6.4	

=== Kawana ===
2009 Queensland state election: Kawana
Party	Candidate	Votes	%	±%
Liberal National	Jarrod Bleijie	14,027	52.3	+4.7
Labor	Jenny Goodwin	10,127	37.7	−4.5
Greens	Lindsay Holt	2,680	10.0	−0.2
Total formal votes		26,834	97.5	
Informal votes		584	2.5	
Turnout		27,418	91.5	
Two-party-preferred result
Liberal National	Jarrod Bleijie	14,524	56.9	+4.3
Labor	Jenny Goodwin	10,989	43.1	−4.3
Liberal National hold		Swing	+4.3	

=== Keppel ===
2009 Queensland state election: Keppel
Party	Candidate	Votes	%	±%
Labor	Paul Hoolihan	14,841	52.6	+1.1
Liberal National	Steve McKenna	11,118	39.4	+3.5
Greens	Paul Bambrick	2,267	8.0	+5.1
Total formal votes		28,226	98.0	
Informal votes		533	2.0	
Turnout		28,759	92.4	
Two-party-preferred result
Labor	Paul Hoolihan	15,674	57.6	−0.5
Liberal National	Steve McKenna	11,527	42.4	+0.5
Labor hold		Swing	−0.5	

=== Lockyer ===
2009 Queensland state election: Lockyer
Party	Candidate	Votes	%	±%
Liberal National	Ian Rickuss	13,761	53.6	+7.5
Labor	John Kelly	9,667	37.6	−2.4
Greens	Emma Hine	2,267	8.8	+2.9
Total formal votes		25,695	97.5	
Informal votes		598	2.5	
Turnout		26,293	92.9	
Two-party-preferred result
Liberal National	Ian Rickuss	14,193	57.6	+4.2
Labor	John Kelly	10,444	42.4	−4.2
Liberal National hold		Swing	+4.2	

=== Logan ===
2009 Queensland state election: Logan
Party	Candidate	Votes	%	±%
Labor	John Mickel	14,184	56.7	−4.8
Liberal National	Tristan McLindon	7,917	31.7	+8.1
Greens	James Brown	2,124	8.5	−0.8
DS4SEQ	Jenny Gear	777	3.1	+3.1
Total formal votes		25,002	96.5	
Informal votes		790	3.5	
Turnout		25,792	91.4	
Two-party-preferred result
Labor	John Mickel	14,982	63.9	−7.2
Liberal National	Tristan McLindon	8,453	36.1	+7.2
Labor hold		Swing	−7.2	

=== Lytton ===
2009 Queensland state election: Lytton
Party	Candidate	Votes	%	±%
Labor	Paul Lucas	14,594	52.5	−4.3
Liberal National	Ryan Murphy	8,960	32.2	+3.1
Greens	Daniel Crute	1,982	7.1	−5.0
Independent	Trish Kelly	1,526	5.5	+5.5
DS4SEQ	Neil Plevey	739	2.7	+2.7
Total formal votes		27,801	98.0	
Informal votes		528	2.0	
Turnout		28,329	92.7	
Two-party-preferred result
Labor	Paul Lucas	15,968	62.2	−4.0
Liberal National	Ryan Murphy	9,699	37.8	+4.0
Labor hold		Swing	−4.0	

=== Mackay ===
2009 Queensland state election: Mackay
Party	Candidate	Votes	%	±%
Labor	Tim Mulherin	16,273	61.4	−0.2
Liberal National	Bob Oakes	8,003	30.2	+1.4
Greens	Jonathon Dykyj	2,244	8.5	+2.4
Total formal votes		26,520	97.5	
Informal votes		617	2.5	
Turnout		27,137	90.8	
Two-party-preferred result
Labor	Tim Mulherin	16,892	66.7	−0.5
Liberal National	Bob Oakes	8,426	33.3	+0.5
Labor hold		Swing	−0.5	

=== Mansfield ===
2009 Queensland state election: Mansfield
Party	Candidate	Votes	%	±%
Labor	Phil Reeves	12,354	47.3	−3.4
Liberal National	Adrian Hart	10,353	39.6	+4.2
Greens	Dean Love	1,768	6.8	−1.0
Family First	Jesse Webb	903	3.5	−2.4
DS4SEQ	Wendy Fitz-Gerald	751	2.9	+2.9
Total formal votes		26,129	98.2	
Informal votes		450	1.8	
Turnout		26,579	92.4	
Two-party-preferred result
Labor	Phil Reeves	13,555	54.4	−4.0
Liberal National	Adrian Hart	11,368	45.6	+4.0
Labor hold		Swing	−4.0	

=== Maroochydore ===
2009 Queensland state election: Maroochydore
Party	Candidate	Votes	%	±%
Liberal National	Fiona Simpson	15,398	56.3	+5.9
Labor	Sue Carlos	8,475	31.0	−2.9
Greens	Brenton Clutterbuck	3,487	12.7	+2.7
Total formal votes		27,360	97.9	
Informal votes		518	2.1	
Turnout		27,878	87.8	
Two-party-preferred result
Liberal National	Fiona Simpson	16,131	62.8	+4.5
Labor	Sue Carlos	9,554	37.2	−4.5
Liberal National hold		Swing	+4.5	

=== Maryborough ===
2009 Queensland state election: Maryborough
Party	Candidate	Votes	%	±%
Independent	Chris Foley	14,119	47.7	−17.7
Liberal National	Anne Maddern	7,633	25.8	+13.6
Labor	Brad Hansen	6,744	22.8	+6.3
Greens	David Arthur	1,120	3.8	−1.7
Total formal votes		29,616	97.9	
Informal votes		590	2.1	
Turnout		30,206	93.0	
Two-candidate-preferred result
Independent	Chris Foley	16,586	66.8	−13.6
Liberal National	Anne Maddern	8,232	33.2	+33.2
Independent hold		Swing	−13.6	

=== Mermaid Beach ===
2009 Queensland state election: Mermaid Beach
Party	Candidate	Votes	%	±%
Liberal National	Ray Stevens	14,628	54.4	+5.9
Labor	Christina Landis	8,999	33.5	−9.3
Greens	Marella Pettinato	1,798	6.7	−2.1
DS4SEQ	Ibolya Monai	744	2.8	+2.8
Independent	Shannon Crane	700	2.6	+2.6
Total formal votes		26,869	97.6	
Informal votes		594	2.4	
Turnout		27,463	88.1	
Two-party-preferred result
Liberal National	Ray Stevens	15,304	60.8	+8.1
Labor	Christina Landis	9,863	39.2	−8.1
Liberal National hold		Swing	+8.1	

=== Mirani ===
2009 Queensland state election: Mirani
Party	Candidate	Votes	%	±%
Liberal National	Ted Malone	13,618	48.0	+2.8
Labor	Scott Murphy	13,215	46.5	−1.5
Greens	Christine Carlisle	1,566	5.5	+5.5
Total formal votes		28,399	98.2	
Informal votes		489	1.8	
Turnout		28,888	92.8	
Two-party-preferred result
Liberal National	Ted Malone	13,965	50.6	+1.8
Labor	Scott Murphy	13,640	49.4	−1.8
Liberal National gain from Labor		Swing	+1.8	

=== Moggill ===
2009 Queensland state election: Moggill
Party	Candidate	Votes	%	±%
Liberal National	Bruce Flegg	13,826	49.2	−1.5
Labor	Robert Colvin	6,918	24.6	−7.4
Greens	Philip Machanick	3,921	13.9	−3.3
Independent	Barry Searle	2,346	8.3	+8.3
DS4SEQ	Andrew Bradbury	1,102	3.9	+3.9
Total formal votes		28,113	98.7	
Informal votes		328	1.3	
Turnout		28,441	92.7	
Two-party-preferred result
Liberal National	Bruce Flegg	15,586	61.3	+3.3
Labor	Robert Colvin	9,847	38.7	−3.3
Liberal National hold		Swing	+3.3	

=== Morayfield ===
2009 Queensland state election: Morayfield
Party	Candidate	Votes	%	±%
Labor	Mark Ryan	12,570	48.4	−6.0
Liberal National	Fiona Brydon	8,581	33.1	−1.0
Independent	Lynette Devereaux	2,898	11.2	+11.2
Greens	Therese O'Brien	1,900	7.3	−4.1
Total formal votes		25,949	97.1	
Informal votes		681	2.9	
Turnout		26,630	92.2	
Two-party-preferred result
Labor	Mark Ryan	13,839	59.1	−1.6
Liberal National	Fiona Brydon	9,565	40.9	+1.6
Labor hold		Swing	−1.6	

=== Mount Coot-tha ===
2009 Queensland state election: Mount Coot-tha
Party	Candidate	Votes	%	±%
Labor	Andrew Fraser	9,544	37.9	−6.9
Liberal National	John Pollard	9,135	36.3	+3.1
Greens	Larissa Waters	5,815	23.1	+1.2
DS4SEQ	Suzanne Karamujic	335	1.3	+1.3
Independent	Dave Zwolenski	202	0.8	+0.8
Independent	James Sinnamon	163	0.6	+0.6
Total formal votes		25,194	98.7	
Informal votes		312	1.3	
Turnout		25,506	87.8	
Two-party-preferred result
Labor	Andrew Fraser	12,493	55.2	−5.1
Liberal National	John Pollard	10,120	44.8	+5.1
Labor hold		Swing	−5.1	

=== Mount Isa ===
2009 Queensland state election: Mount Isa
Party	Candidate	Votes	%	±%
Labor	Betty Kiernan	7,186	44.5	−9.1
Liberal National	Ted Randall	4,768	29.5	−6.9
Independent	Keith Douglas	3,590	22.2	+22.2
Greens	Paul Costin	406	2.5	+2.5
Independent	Roy Collins	216	1.3	+1.3
Total formal votes		16,166	98.2	
Informal votes		275	1.8	
Turnout		16,441	85.8	
Two-party-preferred result
Labor	Betty Kiernan	8,092	55.7	−2.8
Liberal National	Ted Randall	6,430	44.3	+2.8
Labor hold		Swing	−2.8	

=== Mount Ommaney ===
2009 Queensland state election: Mount Ommaney
Party	Candidate	Votes	%	±%
Labor	Julie Attwood	13,074	47.2	−6.4
Liberal National	Tamara Foong	11,161	40.3	+5.0
Greens	Rob Huston	2,763	10.0	−1.1
DS4SEQ	Evan O'Brien	680	2.5	+2.5
Total formal votes		27,678	98.4	
Informal votes		415	1.6	
Turnout		28,093	92.1	
Two-party-preferred result
Labor	Julie Attwood	14,476	54.8	−6.5
Liberal National	Tamara Foong	11,944	45.2	+6.5
Labor hold		Swing	−6.5	

=== Mudgeeraba ===
2009 Queensland state election: Mudgeeraba
Party	Candidate	Votes	%	±%
Liberal National	Ros Bates	11,724	46.2	+4.6
Labor	Dianne Reilly	9,850	38.8	−6.6
Greens	Julian Woolford	1,786	7.0	−0.6
DS4SEQ	Tom Hardin	1,037	4.1	+4.1
Family First	James Tayler	969	3.8	−1.5
Total formal votes		25,366	97.4	
Informal votes		581	2.6	
Turnout		25,947	90.4	
Two-party-preferred result
Liberal National	Ros Bates	12,717	53.9	+6.6
Labor	Dianne Reilly	10,868	46.1	−6.6
Liberal National gain from Labor		Swing	+6.6	

=== Mulgrave ===
2009 Queensland state election: Mulgrave
Party	Candidate	Votes	%	±%
Labor	Curtis Pitt	11,754	48.0	−11.8
Liberal National	Vic Black	8,186	33.4	−6.8
Independent	Damian Byrnes	3,168	12.9	+12.9
Greens	Hugh Whitehouse	1,373	5.6	+5.6
Total formal votes		24,481	97.3	
Informal votes		594	2.7	
Turnout		25,075	90.3	
Two-party-preferred result
Labor	Curtis Pitt	12,876	58.1	−1.7
Liberal National	Vic Black	9,293	41.9	+1.7
Labor hold		Swing	−1.7	

=== Mundingburra ===
2009 Queensland state election: Mundingburra
Party	Candidate	Votes	%	±%
Labor	Lindy Nelson-Carr	12,625	48.4	−6.8
Liberal National	Colin Dwyer	9,859	37.8	+2.7
Greens	Jenny Brown	2,259	8.7	−0.5
Family First	Amanda Nickson	925	3.5	+3.5
Independent	Francis Pauler	415	1.6	+1.6
Total formal votes		26,083	97.4	
Informal votes		652	2.6	
Turnout		26,735	89.1	
Two-party-preferred result
Labor	Lindy Nelson-Carr	13,636	56.6	−4.5
Liberal National	Colin Dwyer	10,460	43.4	+4.5
Labor hold		Swing	−4.5	

=== Murrumba ===
2009 Queensland state election: Murrumba
Party	Candidate	Votes	%	±%
Labor	Dean Wells	12,921	50.8	−4.2
Liberal National	Peter Flannery	9,428	37.1	+4.5
Greens	Rodney Blair	1,914	7.5	+1.7
Family First	Sally Vincent	1,171	4.6	+4.6
Total formal votes		25,434	97.3	
Informal votes		591	2.7	
Turnout		26,025	91.6	
Two-party-preferred result
Labor	Dean Wells	13,745	57.2	−4.9
Liberal National	Peter Flannery	10,280	42.8	+4.9
Labor hold		Swing	−4.9	

=== Nanango ===
2009 Queensland state election: Nanango
Party	Candidate	Votes	%	±%
Liberal National	John Bjelke-Petersen	11,644	40.6	−3.9
Independent	Dorothy Pratt	11,492	40.1	+6.8
Labor	Danielle Randall	4,398	15.3	−1.6
Greens	Frida Forsberg	1,124	3.9	+3.7
Total formal votes		28,658	98.4	
Informal votes		412	1.6	
Turnout		29,070	92.6	
Two-candidate-preferred result
Independent	Dorothy Pratt	13,599	52.9	+0.1
Liberal National	John Bjelke-Petersen	12,108	47.1	−0.1
Independent hold		Swing	+0.1	

=== Nicklin ===
2009 Queensland state election: Nicklin
Party	Candidate	Votes	%	±%
Independent	Peter Wellington	13,243	49.9	−1.9
Liberal National	Steve Morrison	7,503	28.3	+3.9
Labor	Peter Baulch	4,046	15.2	+1.7
Greens	Garry Claridge	1,740	6.6	−1.4
Total formal votes		26,532	98.4	
Informal votes		405	1.6	
Turnout		26,937	90.9	
Two-candidate-preferred result
Independent	Peter Wellington	15,588	66.3	−8.2
Liberal National	Steve Morrison	7,921	33.7	+8.2
Independent hold		Swing	−8.2	

=== Noosa ===
2009 Queensland state election: Noosa
Party	Candidate	Votes	%	±%
Liberal National	Glen Elmes	15,129	56.1	+16.5
Labor	Brian Stockwell	5,543	20.6	−2.1
Greens	Steve Haines	3,573	13.3	+4.3
Independent	Cate Molloy	2,192	8.1	−15.6
Family First	John Chapman	513	1.9	−2.1
Total formal votes		26,950	98.2	
Informal votes		432	1.8	
Turnout		27,382	89.8	
Two-party-preferred result
Liberal National	Glen Elmes	16,618	69.8	+12.4
Labor	Brian Stockwell	7,174	30.2	−12.4
Liberal National hold		Swing	+12.4	

=== Nudgee ===
2009 Queensland state election: Nudgee
Party	Candidate	Votes	%	±%
Labor	Neil Roberts	16,034	56.0	−5.4
Liberal National	Michael Palmer	8,864	30.9	+2.8
Greens	Noel Clothier	2,517	8.8	−1.4
Family First	Centaine Francis	700	2.4	+2.4
Independent	Douglas Crowhurst	534	1.9	+1.9
Total formal votes		28,649	98.1	
Informal votes		517	1.9	
Turnout		29,166	91.7	
Two-party-preferred result
Labor	Neil Roberts	17,318	64.3	−3.9
Liberal National	Michael Palmer	9,633	35.7	+3.9
Labor hold		Swing	−3.9	

=== Pine Rivers ===
2009 Queensland state election: Pine Rivers
Party	Candidate	Votes	%	±%
Labor	Carolyn Male	12,321	47.4	−10.1
Liberal National	Luke Mellers	10,280	39.5	+6.2
Greens	Tony Cole	2,249	8.6	−0.3
Family First	Tim Wallace	1,163	4.5	+4.5
Total formal votes		26,013	90.75	
Informal votes		570	2.14	
Turnout		26,583	92.89	
Two-party-preferred result
Labor	Carolyn Male	13,433	54.6	−8.7
Liberal National	Luke Mellers	11,163	45.4	+8.7
Labor hold		Swing	−8.7	

=== Pumicestone ===
2009 Queensland state election: Pumicestone
Party	Candidate	Votes	%	±%
Labor	Carryn Sullivan	13,811	47.9	−1.9
Liberal National	Shane Moon	11,558	40.1	+0.4
Greens	Ian Bell	2,381	8.3	−0.7
Independent	Colin Bishop	592	2.1	+2.1
Independent	Bert Bowden	247	0.9	+0.9
Independent	Paul McGrane	233	0.8	+0.8
Total formal votes		28,822	97.6	
Informal votes		643	2.4	
Turnout		29,465	91.7	
Two-party-preferred result
Labor	Carryn Sullivan	14,939	55.0	−0.5
Liberal National	Shane Moon	12,229	45.0	+0.5
Labor hold		Swing	−0.5	

=== Redcliffe ===
2009 Queensland state election: Redcliffe
Party	Candidate	Votes	%	±%
Labor	Lillian van Litsenburg	12,202	43.0	−6.5
Liberal National	Bill Gollan	9,727	34.3	−4.9
Independent	Peter Houston	3,953	13.9	+13.9
Greens	Pete Johnson	1,737	6.1	−4.3
Family First	Philip Cramer	743	2.6	+2.6
Total formal votes		28,362	97.9	
Informal votes		569	2.1	
Turnout		28,931	90.9	
Two-party-preferred result
Labor	Lillian van Litsenburg	13,943	55.6	−0.5
Liberal National	Bill Gollan	11,146	44.4	+0.5
Labor hold		Swing	−0.5	

=== Redlands ===
2009 Queensland state election: Redlands
Party	Candidate	Votes	%	±%
Liberal National	Peter Dowling	11,356	44.7	+9.9
Labor	John English	10,923	43.0	−6.7
Greens	Colin Nightingale	1,330	5.2	−1.9
Independent	Mark Edwards	1,066	4.2	+4.2
DS4SEQ	Cameron Crook	435	1.7	+1.7
Independent	Heather Steinberg	283	1.1	+1.1
Total formal votes		25,393	97.6	
Informal votes		523	2.4	
Turnout		25,916	92.1	
Two-party-preferred result
Liberal National	Peter Dowling	11,984	50.1	+6.8
Labor	John English	11,950	49.9	−6.8
Liberal National gain from Labor		Swing	+6.8	

=== Rockhampton ===
2009 Queensland state election: Rockhampton
Party	Candidate	Votes	%	±%
Labor	Robert Schwarten	16,922	61.6	−7.4
Liberal National	Don Kane	7,482	27.2	−2.2
Independent	Gavin Finch	1,962	7.1	+7.1
Greens	Sam Clifford	1,118	4.1	+4.1
Total formal votes		27,484	98.0	
Informal votes		537	2.0	
Turnout		28,021	91.8	
Two-party-preferred result
Labor	Robert Schwarten	17,672	67.9	−1.9
Liberal National	Don Kane	8,348	32.1	+1.9
Labor hold		Swing	−1.9	

=== Sandgate ===
2009 Queensland state election: Sandgate
Party	Candidate	Votes	%	±%
Labor	Vicky Darling	14,708	54.0	−2.0
Liberal National	Lenard Gaffel	8,800	32.3	+4.1
Greens	Keith Skelton	2,231	8.2	+0.8
Family First	Mark Grundy	597	2.2	−4.7
Independent	Kevin Stiller	516	1.9	+1.9
Independent	Mike Crook	361	1.3	+1.3
Total formal votes		27,213	98.0	
Informal votes		515	2.0	
Turnout		27,728	92.9	
Two-party-preferred result
Labor	Vicky Darling	15,880	62.4	−2.9
Liberal National	Lenard Gaffel	9,581	37.6	+2.9
Labor hold		Swing	−2.9	

=== South Brisbane ===
2009 Queensland state election: South Brisbane
Party	Candidate	Votes	%	±%
Labor	Anna Bligh	12,243	48.4	−3.2
Liberal National	Mary Carroll	7,058	27.9	+2.6
Greens	Gary Kane	4,402	17.4	−4.0
Independent	Merilyn Haines	409	1.6	+1.6
Independent	Sam Watson	344	1.4	+1.4
Independent	Greg Martin	330	1.3	+1.3
DS4SEQ	David Rendell	304	1.2	+1.2
Independent	Derek Rosborough	148	0.6	−1.0
Independent	Matt Coates	46	0.2	+0.2
Total formal votes		25,284	98.0	
Informal votes		467	2.0	
Turnout		25,751	86.4	
Two-party-preferred result
Labor	Anna Bligh	14,697	65.0	−3.4
Liberal National	Mary Carroll	7,911	35.0	+3.4
Labor hold		Swing	−3.4	

=== Southern Downs ===
2009 Queensland state election: Southern Downs
Party	Candidate	Votes	%	±%
Liberal National	Lawrence Springborg	20,041	68.3	−1.5
Labor	Geoffrey Keating	7,590	25.9	−3.5
Greens	Bob East	1,724	5.9	+5.6
Total formal votes		29,355	98.5	
Informal votes		417	1.5	
Turnout		29,772	93.1	
Two-party-preferred result
Liberal National	Lawrence Springborg	20,315	71.1	+0.7
Labor	Geoffrey Keating	8,266	28.9	−0.7
Liberal National hold		Swing	+0.7	

=== Southport ===
2009 Queensland state election: Southport
Party	Candidate	Votes	%	±%
Labor	Peter Lawlor	11,945	45.3	−7.1
Liberal National	Tania Wright	10,646	40.4	+2.3
Greens	Stephen Dalton	1,931	7.3	−2.2
DS4SEQ	Brian Morris	856	3.2	+3.2
Independent	Mark Tull	622	2.4	+2.4
Independent	Graeme Hill	354	1.3	+1.3
Total formal votes		26,354	97.2	
Informal votes		687	2.8	
Turnout		27,041	87.9	
Two-party-preferred result
Labor	Peter Lawlor	13,013	53.5	−4.6
Liberal National	Tania Wright	11,319	46.5	+4.6
Labor hold		Swing	−4.6	

=== Springwood ===
2009 Queensland state election: Springwood
Party	Candidate	Votes	%	±%
Labor	Barbara Stone	13,536	46.9	−2.5
Liberal National	Dave Beard	11,594	40.2	+1.7
Greens	Neil Cotter	2,088	7.2	+0.9
Independent	Allan de Brenni	1,081	3.7	+3.7
Independent	Lesley Noah	334	1.2	−3.6
Independent	Kim Limburg	199	0.7	+0.7
Total formal votes		28,832	97.8	
Informal votes		605	2.2	
Turnout		29,437	91.9	
Two-party-preferred result
Labor	Barbara Stone	14,518	54.1	−1.6
Liberal National	Dave Beard	12,326	45.9	+1.6
Labor hold		Swing	−1.6	

=== Stafford ===
2009 Queensland state election: Stafford
Party	Candidate	Votes	%	±%
Labor	Stirling Hinchliffe	12,870	48.4	−5.9
Liberal National	Brad Carswell	10,062	37.9	+7.3
Greens	Tristan Peach	3,133	11.8	−0.1
Family First	Paul Fomiatti	499	1.9	+1.8
Total formal votes		26,564	98.1	
Informal votes		484	1.9	
Turnout		27,048	91.3	
Two-party-preferred result
Labor	Stirling Hinchliffe	14,460	57.3	−6.9
Liberal National	Brad Carswell	10,778	42.7	+6.9
Labor hold		Swing	−6.9	

=== Stretton ===
2009 Queensland state election: Stretton
Party	Candidate	Votes	%	±%
Labor	Stephen Robertson	14,404	53.6	−5.5
Liberal National	Kerrie Frizzell	9,974	37.1	+5.0
Greens	Jane Cajdler	2,505	9.3	+0.5
Total formal votes		26,883	97.9	
Informal votes		509	2.1	
Turnout		27,392	90.8	
Two-party-preferred result
Labor	Stephen Robertson	15,293	59.5	−5.0
Liberal National	Kerrie Frizzell	10,418	40.5	+5.0
Labor hold		Swing	−5.0	

=== Sunnybank ===
2009 Queensland state election: Sunnybank
Party	Candidate	Votes	%	±%
Labor	Judy Spence	14,398	54.5	−3.7
Liberal National	Marie Jackson	9,358	35.4	+4.7
Greens	Matthew Ryan-Sykes	2,101	8.0	+0.1
Independent	Bruce Spiers	355	1.3	+1.3
Independent	Peter Flaws	204	0.8	+0.8
Total formal votes		26,416	97.5	
Informal votes		638	2.5	
Turnout		27,054	90.0	
Two-party-preferred result
Labor	Judy Spence	15,261	60.8	−4.4
Liberal National	Marie Jackson	9,845	39.2	+4.4
Labor hold		Swing	−4.4	

=== Surfers Paradise ===
2009 Queensland state election: Surfers Paradise
Party	Candidate	Votes	%	±%
Liberal National	John-Paul Langbroek	15,075	59.0	+1.6
Labor	Caleb Rook	7,017	27.5	−6.2
Greens	Bridget Maizey	1,671	6.5	−2.3
DS4SEQ	Wendy Coe	1,166	4.6	+4.6
Independent	Don Magin	613	2.4	+2.4
Total formal votes		25,542	97.7	
Informal votes		556	2.3	
Turnout		26,098	85.8	
Two-party-preferred result
Liberal National	John-Paul Langbroek	15,808	66.5	+4.4
Labor	Caleb Rook	7,958	33.5	−4.4
Liberal National hold		Swing	+4.4	

=== Thuringowa ===
2009 Queensland state election: Thuringowa
Party	Candidate	Votes	%	±%
Labor	Craig Wallace	12,830	49.1	−11.3
Liberal National	Tony Elms	8,841	33.9	+5.1
Independent	Ken Turner	2,793	10.7	+10.7
Greens	Frank Reilly	1,113	4.3	−2.1
Independent	Paul Lynam	534	2.0	+2.0
Total formal votes		26,111	96.5	
Informal votes		807	3.5	
Turnout		26,918	89.9	
Two-party-preferred result
Labor	Craig Wallace	13,574	58.5	−8.4
Liberal National	Tony Elms	9,641	41.5	+8.4
Labor hold		Swing	−8.4	

=== Toowoomba North ===
2009 Queensland state election: Toowoomba North
Party	Candidate	Votes	%	±%
Labor	Kerry Shine	13,911	47.7	−2.7
Liberal National	Trevor Watts	12,289	42.1	+6.0
Greens	Brett Robinson	1,515	5.2	−0.4
Family First	Archie Franz	654	2.2	−2.2
Independent	Perry Jewell	494	1.7	+1.7
Independent	Neil Riethmuller	303	1.0	+1.0
Total formal votes		29,166	98.1	
Informal votes		544	1.9	
Turnout		29,710	91.7	
Two-party-preferred result
Labor	Kerry Shine	14,651	53.2	−4.4
Liberal National	Trevor Watts	12,876	46.8	+4.4
Labor hold		Swing	−4.4	

=== Toowoomba South ===
2009 Queensland state election: Toowoomba South
Party	Candidate	Votes	%	±%
Liberal National	Mike Horan	15,708	53.5	+1.9
Labor	Dan Toombs	10,992	37.4	+4.9
Greens	Barnaby Heaton	1,357	4.6	−1.5
Independent	Peter Pyke	1,308	4.5	+4.5
Total formal votes		29,365	98.2	
Informal votes		519	1.8	
Turnout		29,884	91.9	
Two-party-preferred result
Liberal National	Mike Horan	16,300	58.2	−3.0
Labor	Dan Toombs	11,699	41.8	+3.0
Liberal National hold		Swing	−3.0	

=== Townsville ===
2009 Queensland state election: Townsville
Party	Candidate	Votes	%	±%
Labor	Mandy Johnstone	11,109	44.4	−7.7
Liberal National	Murray Hurst	9,844	39.3	+4.0
Greens	Jenny Stirling	2,630	10.5	+3.4
Independent	Delena Oui-Foster	855	3.4	+3.4
Family First	Michael Punshon	597	2.4	+2.4
Total formal votes		25,035	97.4	
Informal votes		625	2.6	
Turnout		25,660	86.8	
Two-party-preferred result
Labor	Mandy Johnstone	12,405	54.0	−5.4
Liberal National	Murray Hurst	10,560	46.0	+5.4
Labor hold		Swing	−5.4	

=== Warrego ===
2009 Queensland state election: Warrego
Party	Candidate	Votes	%	±%
Liberal National	Howard Hobbs	13,805	59.8	−5.4
Labor	Elliott Thornton	4,378	19.0	−5.1
Independent	Wally Gleeson	3,831	16.6	+16.6
Family First	Tony Kusters	548	2.4	−3.8
Greens	Kathryn Wildermuth	411	1.8	+1.8
Independent	Allen Hassall	126	0.5	+0.5
Total formal votes		23,099	98.6	
Informal votes		311	1.4	
Turnout		23,410	90.8	
Two-party-preferred result
Liberal National	Howard Hobbs	14,884	74.3	+1.7
Labor	Elliott Thornton	5,138	25.7	−1.7
Liberal National hold		Swing	+1.7	

=== Waterford ===
2009 Queensland state election: Waterford
Party	Candidate	Votes	%	±%
Labor	Evan Moorhead	16,273	59.2	+1.1
Liberal National	Freya Ostapovitch	8,148	29.6	+1.4
Greens	Dale Taylor	2,286	8.3	+1.4
Independent	David Howse	787	2.9	+2.9
Total formal votes		27,494	96.4	
Informal votes		920	3.6	
Turnout		28,414	89.1	
Two-party-preferred result
Labor	Evan Moorhead	17,223	66.5	+0.2
Liberal National	Freya Ostapovitch	8,693	33.5	−0.2
Labor hold		Swing	+0.2	

=== Whitsunday ===
2009 Queensland state election: Whitsunday
Party	Candidate	Votes	%	±%
Labor	Jan Jarratt	13,323	49.7	+3.1
Liberal National	Paul Joice	11,913	44.4	−1.4
Greens	Austin Lund	1,567	5.8	+1.7
Total formal votes		26,803	98.0	
Informal votes		486	2.0	
Turnout		27,289	90.9	
Two-party-preferred result
Labor	Jan Jarratt	13,881	53.2	+2.8
Liberal National	Paul Joice	12,192	46.8	−2.8
Labor hold		Swing	+2.8	

=== Woodridge ===
2009 Queensland state election: Woodridge
Party	Candidate	Votes	%	±%
Labor	Desley Scott	17,300	68.8	+1.1
Liberal National	Sarina Patane	5,421	21.6	+3.5
Greens	John Reddington	2,408	9.6	+2.5
Total formal votes		25,129	96.8	
Informal votes		767	3.2	
Turnout		25,896	88.1	
Two-party-preferred result
Labor	Desley Scott	18,047	75.4	−1.8
Liberal National	Sarina Patane	5,896	24.6	+1.8
Labor hold		Swing	−1.8	

=== Yeerongpilly ===
2009 Queensland state election: Yeerongpilly
Party	Candidate	Votes	%	±%
Labor	Simon Finn	12,846	46.3	–4.4
Liberal National	Julianna Kneebone	9,766	35.2	+4.0
Greens	Libby Connors	4,431	16.0	+0.3
DS4SEQ	Tom McCosker	716	2.6	+2.6
Total formal votes		27,759	98.4	+0.2
Informal votes		473	1.6	−0.2
Turnout		28,219	91.1	
Two-party-preferred result
Labor	Simon Finn	15,236	58.7	–4.1
Liberal National	Julianna Kneebone	10,705	41.3	+4.1
Labor hold		Swing	–4.1	

== See also ==
- 2009 Queensland state election
- Candidates of the Queensland state election, 2009
