= Candidates of the 2009 Queensland state election =

This article provides information on candidates standing for the 2009 Queensland state election, which was held on 21 March 2009.

== Redistribution ==
A redistribution of electoral boundaries occurred in 2008.

The electorates of Charters Towers, Cunningham, Darling Downs, Fitzroy, Kurwongbah, Mount Gravatt, Robina, and Tablelands were abolished.

The electorates of Buderim, Condamine, Coomera, Dalrymple, Mermaid Beach, Morayfield, Pine Rivers, and Sunnybank were created.

The redistribution merged Charters Towers with Tablelands to create the National-held Dalrymple, Fitzroy into Mirani, and Cunningham with Darling Downs to create the National-held Condamine, all in regional Queensland. Notionally Liberal-held Buderim was created on the Sunshine Coast, notionally Labor-held Morayfield in the corridor north of Brisbane, and notionally Labor-held Coomera was created on the Gold Coast. Kurwongbah was renamed Pine Rivers, Mount Gravatt was renamed Sunnybank, and Robina was renamed Mermaid Beach. Burdekin, Clayfield, and Mirani became notionally Labor-held, while Glass House became notionally National-held.

The changes resulted in 62 notionally Labor-held seats, 8 notionally Liberal-held seats, 15 notionally National-held seats, and 4 notionally Independent-held seats. All Liberal-held and National-held seats became Liberal National-held seats.

- The member for Charters Towers, Shane Knuth (Liberal National), contested Dalrymple.
- The member for Cunningham, Stuart Copeland (Independent), contested Condamine.
- The member for Darling Downs, Ray Hopper (Liberal National), contested Condamine.
- The member for Glass House, Carolyn Male (Labor), contested Pine Rivers.
- The member for Kawana, Steve Dickson (Liberal National), contested Buderim.
- The member for Mount Gravatt, Judy Spence (Labor), contested Sunnybank.
- The member for Robina, Ray Stevens (Liberal National), contested Mermaid Beach.
- The member for Tablelands, Rosa Lee Long (One Nation Party), contested Dalrymple.

== By-elections ==
- On 13 October 2007, Grace Grace (Labor) was elected to succeed former Premier Peter Beattie (Labor), who resigned on 13 September 2007, as the member for Brisbane Central.

== Retiring Members ==
=== Labor ===
- Chris Bombolas MP (Chatsworth) - Announced 19 February 2009.
- Gary Fenlon MP (Greenslopes) - Announced 15 February 2009.
- Ken Hayward MP (Kallangur)
- Linda Lavarch MP (Kurwongbah)
- Jim Pearce MP (Fitzroy)
- Warren Pitt MP (Mulgrave) - Announced 17 February 2009.
- Pat Purcell MP (Bulimba)
- Mike Reynolds MP (Townsville) - Announced 15 February 2009.
- Rod Welford MP (Everton)

=== Liberal National ===
- Kev Lingard MP (Beaudesert)

== Legislative Assembly ==
Sitting members are shown in bold text. Successful candidates are highlighted in the relevant colour. Where there is possible confusion, an asterisk (*) is also used.

Electorate	Held by	Labor candidate	LNP candidate	Greens candidate	Other candidates
Albert	Labor	**Margaret Keech**	Andrea Johanson	Marlee Bruinsma	Geoff Flannery (Ind)
Algester	Labor	**Karen Struthers**	Anthony Shorten	Stan Cajdler	Steve Christian (FFP)
Ashgrove	Labor	**Kate Jones**	Scott McConnel	Robert Hogg	Bill Grieve (DS4SEQ); Ian Saunders (Ind); Ruth Spencer (Ind)
Aspley	Labor	**Bonny Barry**	Tracy Davis	James White	Allan Vincent (FFP)
Barron River	Labor	**Steve Wettenhall**	Wendy Richardson	Sarah Isaacs	
Beaudesert	LNP	Brett McCreadie	Aidan McLindon	Andy Grodecki	Keith Gee (Ind); Pauline Hanson (Ind); Russell Pata (DS4SEQ); Richard Somers (Ind)
Brisbane Central	Labor	**Grace Grace**	Mark Wood	Anne Boccabella	Adrian Miller (DS4SEQ)
Broadwater	Labor	**Peta-Kaye Croft**	Richard Towson	Graeme Maizey	Ben Monaghan (DS4SEQ); Rohan Turnley (Ind)
Buderim	LNP	Laura Hawkins	**Steve Dickson**	Daniel Stevens	Neil Heyme (DS4SEQ); Cathy Turner (FFP)
Bulimba	Labor	Di Farmer	Paul Walker	Angela Dean	Angela Wright (DS4SEQ)
Bundaberg	LNP	Phil Freeman	**Jack Dempsey**	Erin Hall	
Bundamba	Labor	**Jo-Ann Miller**	Simon Ingram	Ric Nattrass	Cameron Hodges (DS4SEQ); Patricia Petersen (Ind); Bevan Smith (FFP)
Burdekin	Labor	Les Walker	**Rosemary Menkens**	Maria MacDonald	
Burleigh	Labor	**Christine Smith**	Michael Hart	Anja Light	Bryden Elssmann (DS4SEQ); Jeremy Fredericks (FFP); Ray Sperring (Ind)
Burnett	LNP	Chris Pianta	**Rob Messenger**	Bernie Williams	Robert Bromwich (Ind); Peter Wyatt (Ind)
Cairns	Labor	**Desley Boyle**	Joel Harrop	Steve Brech	Janice Skipp (FFP)
Callide	LNP	David Pullen	**Jeff Seeney**	Camilla Percy	Clare Mildren (Ind)
Caloundra	LNP	Jody Tunnicliffe	**Mark McArdle**	Roger Callen	John Fogarty (DS4SEQ); Mike Jessop (Ind)
Capalaba	Labor	**Michael Choi**	Paul Gleeson	Chad Kirby	
Chatsworth	Labor	Steve Kilburn	Andrea Caltabiano	Jason Cooney	Jason Furze (DS4SEQ); Tony Zegenhagen (Ind)
Clayfield	Labor	Joff Lelliott	**Tim Nicholls**	Andrew Jeremijenko	Randle Thomas (DS4SEQ); Brendan Wong (FFP)
Cleveland	Labor	**Phil Weightman**	Mark Robinson	Colin Nightingale	Richard Jemison (DS4SEQ)
Condamine	LNP	Tracey Harris	**Ray Hopper**	Craig Sheehan	Stephanie Bugg (Ind); **Stuart Copeland** (Ind); Rod Watson (ONP)
Cook	Labor	**Jason O'Brien**	Craig Batchelor	Neville St John-Wood	Michaelangelo Newie (Ind)
Coomera	Labor	Leeanne Enoch	Michael Crandon	Petrina Maizey	Russell Anderson (DS4SEQ)
Currumbin	LNP	Michael Riordan	**Jann Stuckey**	Inge Light	Jason Hockings (DS4SEQ)
Dalrymple	LNP	Jason Briskey	**Shane Knuth**	Glenn Martin	Harrison Duncan (Ind); Adrienne Freeman (Ind); **Rosa Lee Long** (ONP)
Everton	Labor	Murray Watt	Troy Knox	Bruce Hallett	Anthony Vella (DS4SEQ)
Ferny Grove	Labor	**Geoff Wilson**	Dale Shuttleworth	Howard Nielsen	Mark White (FFP)
Gaven	Labor	**Phil Gray**	Alex Douglas	Sally Spain	David Montgomery (Ind); Derek Radke (FFP); Ramiah Selwood (Ind)
Gladstone	Independent	Peter O'Sullivan		Kirsten Neilson	**Liz Cunningham** (Ind)
Glass House	LNP	Jennifer Hansen-Read	Andrew Powell	Jenny Fitzgibbon	
Greenslopes	Labor	Cameron Dick	Ian Kaye	Darryl Rosin	Brad Armstrong (DS4SEQ); Doug Russell (Ind)
Gregory	LNP	Fabian Webber	**Vaughan Johnson**	Carla Dalton	
Gympie	LNP	Daniel Tabone	**David Gibson**	Kent Hutton	Elisa Roberts (Ind)
Hervey Bay	Labor	**Andrew McNamara**	Ted Sorensen	Paul Brown	Jason Powning (DS4SEQ); Peter Schuback (Ind)
Hinchinbrook	LNP	Mark Platt	**Andrew Cripps**	Michelle Mackin	Raymond Thomson (Ind)
Inala	Labor	**Annastacia Palaszczuk**	Leo Perkins	Alan Maizey	Felicity Ryan (FFP)
Indooroopilly	Labor	Sarah Warner	Scott Emerson	**Ronan Lee**	John Burkett (DS4SEQ)
Ipswich	Labor	**Rachel Nolan**	Suzie Holmes	Peter Luxton	Elwyn Denman (FFP)
Ipswich West	Labor	**Wayne Wendt**	Sean Choat	Di Clark	
Kallangur	Labor	Mary-Anne O'Neill	Trevor Ruthenberg	Craig Graham	Mark McDowell (DS4SEQ); Alan Revie (FFP)
Kawana	LNP	Jenny Goodwin	Jarrod Bleijie	Lindsay Holt	
Keppel	Labor	**Paul Hoolihan**	Stephen McKenna	Paul Bambrick	
Lockyer	LNP	John Kelly	**Ian Rickuss**	Emma Hine	
Logan	Labor	**John Mickel**	Tristan McLindon	Jamie Brown	Jenny Gear (DS4SEQ)
Lytton	Labor	**Paul Lucas**	Ryan Murphy	Daniel Crute	Trish Kelly (Ind); Neil Plevey (DS4SEQ)
Mackay	Labor	**Tim Mulherin**	Robert Oakes	Jonathon Dykyj	
Mansfield	Labor	**Phil Reeves**	Adrian Hart	Dean Love	Wendy Fitz-Gerald (DS4SEQ); Jesse Webb (FFP)
Maroochydore	LNP	Sue Carlos	**Fiona Simpson**	Brenton Clutterbuck	
Maryborough	Independent	Brad Hansen	Anne Maddern	David Arthur	**Chris Foley** (Ind)
Mermaid Beach	LNP	Christina Landis	**Ray Stevens**	Marella Pettinato	Shannon Crane (Ind); Ibolya Monai (DS4SEQ)
Mirani	Labor	Scott Murphy	**Ted Malone**	Christine Carlisle	
Moggill	LNP	Robert Colvin	**Bruce Flegg**	Philip Machanick	Andrew Bradbury (DS4SEQ); Barry Searle (Ind)
Morayfield	Labor	Mark Ryan	Fiona Brydon	Therese O'Brien	Lynette Devereaux (Ind)
Mount Coot-tha	Labor	**Andrew Fraser**	John Pollard	Larissa Waters	Suzanne Karamujic (DS4SEQ); James Sinnamon (Ind); Dave Zwolenski (Ind)
Mount Isa	Labor	**Betty Kiernan**	Ted Randall	Paul Costin	Roy Collins (Ind); Keith Douglas (Ind)
Mount Ommaney	Labor	**Julie Attwood**	Tamara Foong	Robert Huston	Evan O'Brien (DS4SEQ)
Mudgeeraba	Labor	**Dianne Reilly**	Ros Bates	Julian Woolford	Tom Hardin (DS4SEQ); James Tayler (FFP)
Mulgrave	Labor	Curtis Pitt	Victor Black	Hugh Whitehouse	Damian Byrnes (Ind)
Mundingburra	Labor	**Lindy Nelson-Carr**	Colin Dwyer	Jenny Brown	Amanda Nickson (FFP); Francis Pauler (Ind)
Murrumba	Labor	**Dean Wells**	Peter Flannery	Rod Blair	Sally Vincent (FFP)
Nanango	Independent	Danielle Randall	John Bjelke-Petersen	Frida Forsberg	**Dorothy Pratt** (Ind)
Nicklin	Independent	Peter Baulch	Steven Morrison	Garry Claridge	**Peter Wellington** (Ind)
Noosa	LNP	Brian Stockwell	**Glen Elmes**	Stephen Haines	John Chapman (FFP); Cate Molloy (Ind)
Nudgee	Labor	**Neil Roberts**	Michael Palmer	Noel Clothier	Douglas Crowhurst (Ind); Catherine Francis (FFP)
Pine Rivers	Labor	**Carolyn Male**	Luke Mellers	Tony Cole	Tim Wallace (FFP)
Pumicestone	Labor	**Carryn Sullivan**	Shane Moon	Ian Bell	Colin Bishop (Ind); Bert Bowden (Ind); Paul McGrane (Ind)
Redcliffe	Labor	**Lillian van Litsenburg**	Bill Gollan	Peter Johnson	Philip Cramer (FFP); Peter Houston (Ind)
Redlands	Labor	**John English**	Peter Dowling	Rod Young	Mark Edwards (Ind); Cameron Krook (DS4SEQ); Heather Steinberg (Ind)
Rockhampton	Labor	**Robert Schwarten**	Don Kane	Sam Clifford	Gavin Finch (Ind)
Sandgate	Labor	**Vicky Darling**	Lenard Gaffel	Keith Skelton	Mike Crook (Ind); Mark Grundy (FFP); Kevin Stiller (Ind)
South Brisbane	Labor	**Anna Bligh**	Mary Carroll	Gary Kane	Matt Coates (Ind); Merilyn Haines (Ind); Greg Martin (Ind); David Rendell (DS4SEQ); Derek Rosborough (Ind); Sam Watson (Ind)
Southern Downs	LNP	Geoffrey Keating	**Lawrence Springborg**	Bob East	
Southport	Labor	**Peter Lawlor**	Tania Wright	Stephen Dalton	Graeme Hill (Ind); Brian Morris (DS4SEQ); Mark Tull (Ind)
Springwood	Labor	**Barbara Stone**	Dave Beard	Neil Cotter	Allan de Brenni (Ind); Kim Limburg (Ind); Lesley Noah (Ind)
Stafford	Labor	**Stirling Hinchliffe**	Brad Carswell	Tristan Peach	Paul Fomiatti (FFP)
Stretton	Labor	**Stephen Robertson**	Kerrie Frizzell	Jane Cajdler	
Sunnybank	Labor	**Judy Spence**	Marie Jackson	Matthew Ryan-Sykes	Peter Flaws (Ind); Bruce Spiers (Ind)
Surfers Paradise	LNP	Caleb Rook	**John-Paul Langbroek**	Bridget Maizey	Wendy Coe (DS4SEQ); Don Magin (Ind)
Thuringowa	Labor	**Craig Wallace**	Tony Elms	Frank Reilly	Paul Lynam (Ind); Ken Turner (Ind)
Toowoomba North	Labor	**Kerry Shine**	Trevor Watts	Brett Robinson	Archie Franz (FFP); Perry Jewell (Ind); Neil Riethmuller (Ind)
Toowoomba South	LNP	Daniel Toombs	**Mike Horan**	Barnaby Heaton	Peter Pyke (Ind)
Townsville	Labor	Mandy Johnstone	Murray Hurst	Jenny Stirling	Delena Oui-Foster (Ind); Michael Punshon (FFP)
Warrego	LNP	Elliott Thornton	**Howard Hobbs**	Kate East	Wally Gleeson (Ind); Allen Hassall (Ind); Tony Kusters (FFP)
Waterford	Labor	**Evan Moorhead**	Freya Ostapovitch	Dale Taylor	David Howse (Ind)
Whitsunday	Labor	**Jan Jarratt**	Paul Joice	Austin Lund	
Woodridge	Labor	**Desley Scott**	Sarina Patane	John Reddington	
Yeerongpilly	Labor	**Simon Finn**	Julianna Kneebone	Libby Connors	Tom McCosker (DS4SEQ)

== See also ==
- Members of the Queensland Legislative Assembly, 2006–2009
- Members of the Queensland Legislative Assembly, 2009–2012
- 2009 Queensland state election
