= Electoral results for the district of Kallangur =

Queensland, Australia, district election results

This is a list of electoral results for the electoral district of Kallangur in Queensland state elections.

== Members for Kallangur ==
Member	Party	Term
Ken Hayward	Labor	1992–2009
Mary-Anne O'Neill	Labor	2009–2012
Trevor Ruthenberg	Liberal National	2012–2015
Shane King	Labor	2015–2017

== Election results ==
=== Elections in the 2010s ===
2015 Queensland state election: Kallangur
Party	Candidate	Votes	%	±%
Labor	Shane King	14,285	48.12	+19.27
Liberal National	Trevor Ruthenberg	12,235	41.21	−10.84
Greens	Jason Kennedy	3,166	10.66	+2.75
Total formal votes		29,686	97.49	−0.04
Informal votes		763	2.51	+0.04
Turnout		30,449	91.18	−1.06
Two-party-preferred result
Labor	Shane King	16,196	56.13	+18.56
Liberal National	Trevor Ruthenberg	12,657	43.87	−18.56
Labor gain from Liberal National		Swing	+18.56	

2012 Queensland state election: Kallangur
Party	Candidate	Votes	%	±%
Liberal National	Trevor Ruthenberg	13,983	52.05	+12.63
Labor	Mary-Anne O'Neill	7,750	28.85	−18.16
Katter's Australian	Michael Bates	3,005	11.19	+11.19
Greens	Rachel Doherty	2,125	7.91	−0.77
Total formal votes		26,863	97.53	−0.14
Informal votes		681	2.47	+0.14
Turnout		27,544	92.24	−0.01
Two-party-preferred result
Liberal National	Trevor Ruthenberg	15,187	62.43	+17.06
Labor	Mary-Anne O'Neill	9,138	37.57	−17.06
Liberal National gain from Labor		Swing	+17.06	

=== Elections in the 2000s ===
2009 Queensland state election: Kallangur
Party	Candidate	Votes	%	±%
Labor	Mary-Anne O'Neill	11,871	47.0	−6.7
Liberal National	Trevor Ruthenberg	9,955	39.4	+6.0
Greens	Craig Graham	2,193	8.7	−1.5
Family First	Alan Revie	801	3.2	+3.2
DS4SEQ	Mark McDowell	434	1.7	+1.7
Total formal votes		25,254	97.5	
Informal votes		602	2.5	
Turnout		25,856	92.3	
Two-party-preferred result
Labor	Mary-Anne O'Neill	12,904	54.6	−6.4
Liberal National	Trevor Ruthenberg	10,717	45.4	+6.4
Labor hold		Swing	−6.4	

2006 Queensland state election: Kallangur
Party	Candidate	Votes	%	±%
Labor	Ken Hayward	14,509	53.8	+1.9
National	Fiona Brydon	9,203	34.1	+7.6
Greens	Rachel Doherty	3,266	12.1	+3.5
Total formal votes		26,978	97.2	−0.3
Informal votes		772	2.8	+0.3
Turnout		27,750	92.3	−0.5
Two-party-preferred result
Labor	Ken Hayward	15,269	60.3	−3.4
National	Fiona Brydon	10,042	39.7	+3.4
Labor hold		Swing	−3.4	

2004 Queensland state election: Kallangur
Party	Candidate	Votes	%	±%
Labor	Ken Hayward	13,099	51.9	−6.4
National	Fay Driscoll	6,688	26.5	+26.5
One Nation	Howard Shepherd	3,275	13.0	+13.0
Greens	Suzi Tooke	2,160	8.6	+1.3
Total formal votes		25,222	97.5	+0.2
Informal votes		638	2.5	−0.2
Turnout		25,860	92.8	−0.9
Two-party-preferred result
Labor	Ken Hayward	14,265	63.7	−7.7
National	Fay Driscoll	8,143	36.3	+36.3
Labor hold		Swing	−7.7	

2001 Queensland state election: Kallangur
Party	Candidate	Votes	%	±%
Labor	Ken Hayward	13,312	58.3	+15.6
Liberal	Scott Driscoll	4,366	19.1	−2.9
Independent	Neville Jones	1,750	7.7	+7.7
City Country Alliance	Ray Eldridge	1,740	7.6	+7.6
Greens	Suzi Tooke	1,656	7.3	+4.4
Total formal votes		22,824	97.3	
Informal votes		642	2.7	
Turnout		23,466	93.7	
Two-party-preferred result
Labor	Ken Hayward	14,165	71.4	+14.8
Liberal	Scott Driscoll	5,681	28.6	−14.8
Labor hold		Swing	+14.8	

=== Elections in the 1990s ===
1998 Queensland state election: Kallangur
Party	Candidate	Votes	%	±%
Labor	Ken Hayward	12,797	42.7	−5.4
One Nation	Boyd Nimmo	8,077	26.9	+26.9
Liberal	Scott Driscoll	6,583	22.0	−14.3
Christian Democrats	Howard Shepherd	1,265	4.2	+4.2
Greens	Noel Hoffman	898	3.0	−6.8
Reform	Allan Taylor	198	0.7	+0.7
Independent	Peter Birt	166	0.6	+0.6
Total formal votes		29,984	98.3	+0.5
Informal votes		528	1.7	−0.5
Turnout		30,512	93.7	+0.9
Two-candidate-preferred result
Labor	Ken Hayward	14,745	53.9	−0.1
One Nation	Boyd Nimmo	12,608	46.1	+46.1
Labor hold		Swing	−0.1	

1995 Queensland state election: Kallangur
Party	Candidate	Votes	%	±%
Labor	Ken Hayward	12,576	48.1	−14.1
Liberal	Scott Driscoll	9,496	36.3	−1.6
Greens	Craig Josey	2,564	9.8	+9.8
Independent	Rona Joyner	1,536	5.9	+5.9
Total formal votes		26,172	97.8	+1.0
Informal votes		591	2.2	−1.0
Turnout		26,763	92.8	
Two-party-preferred result
Labor	Ken Hayward	13,623	54.0	−8.1
Liberal	Scott Driscoll	11,604	46.0	+8.1
Labor hold		Swing	−8.1	

1992 Queensland state election: Kallangur
Party	Candidate	Votes	%	±%
Labor	Ken Hayward	13,266	62.1	+5.9
Liberal	Col Cruden	8,092	37.9	+17.5
Total formal votes		21,358	96.8	
Informal votes		700	3.2	
Turnout		22,058	92.2	
Labor hold		Swing	+2.5	
