= Post-election pendulum for the 2012 Queensland state election =

The following is a Mackerras pendulum for the 2012 Queensland state election.

"Very safe" seats require a swing of more than 20 points to change, "safe" seats10–20 points to change, "fairly safe" seats 6–10 points, and "marginal" seats less than 6 points.

Liberal National seats
Marginal
Bulimba	Aaron Dillaway	LNP	0.1 points
Maryborough	Anne Maddern	LNP v IND	0.3 points
Waterford	Mike Latter	LNP	1.0 points
Thuringowa	Sam Cox	LNP v KAP	1.4 points
Yeerongpilly	Carl Judge	LNP	1.4 points
Lytton	Neil Symes	LNP	1.6 points
Greenslopes	Ian Kaye	LNP	2.5 points
Sandgate	Kerry Millard	LNP	2.9 points
Nudgee	Jason Woodforth	LNP	3.1 points
Cook	David Kempton	LNP	3.4 points
Hinchinbrook	Andrew Cripps	LNP v KAP	3.6 points
Capalaba	Steve Davies	LNP	3.7 points
Ipswich	Ian Berry	LNP	4.2 points
Logan	Michael Pucci	LNP	4.8 points
Townsville	John Hathaway	LNP	4.8 points
Brisbane Central	Robert Cavallucci	LNP	4.9 points
Mount Coot-tha	Saxon Rice	LNP	5.4 points
Morayfield	Darren Grimwade	LNP	5.6 points
Ashgrove	Campbell Newman	LNP	5.7 points
Fairly safe
Keppel	Bruce Young	LNP	6.4 points
Stafford	Chris Davis	LNP	7.1 points
Ipswich West	Sean Choat	LNP	7.2 points
Burnett	Stephen Bennett	LNP v IND	8.5 points
Cairns	Gavin King	LNP	8.9 points
Nanango	Deb Frecklington	LNP v KAP	9.0 points
Algester	Anthony Shorten	LNP	9.1 points
Barron River	Michael Trout	LNP	9.5 points
Ferny Grove	Dale Shuttleworth	LNP	9.5 points
Murrumba	Reg Gulley	LNP	9.5 points
Stretton	Freya Ostapovitch	LNP	9.6 points
Toowoomba North	Trevor Watts	LNP	9.6 points
Safe
Redcliffe	Scott Driscoll	LNP	10.1 points
Mundingburra	David Crisafulli	LNP	10.2 points
Sunnybank	Mark Stewart	LNP	10.2 points
Beaudesert	Jon Krause	LNP v KAP	10.6 points
Whitsunday	Jason Costigan	LNP	10.7 points
Burleigh	Michael Hart	LNP	11.0 points
Mansfield	Ian Walker	LNP	11.1 points
Mirani	Ted Malone	LNP	11.2 points
Broadwater	Verity Barton	LNP	11.3 points
Albert	Mark Boothman	LNP	11.9 points
Pumicestone	Lisa France	LNP	12.1 points
Kallangur	Trevor Ruthenberg	LNP	12.4 points
Burdekin	Rosemary Menkens	LNP v KAP	12.5 points
Everton	Tim Mander	LNP	13.2 points
Callide	Jeff Seeney	LNP v KAP	13.5 points
Pine Rivers	Seath Holswich	LNP	13.7 points
Chatsworth	Steve Minnikin	LNP	13.9 points
Southport	Rob Molhoek	LNP	14.7 points
Lockyer	Ian Rickuss	LNP v KAP	14.9 points
Springwood	John Grant	LNP	15.4 points
Mount Ommaney	Tarnya Smith	LNP	16.5 points
Gympie	David Gibson	LNP v KAP	17.3 points
Cleveland	Mark Robinson	LNP	18.1 points
Bundaberg	Jack Dempsey	LNP	18.2 points
Gaven	Alex Douglas	LNP	19.1 points
Indooroopilly	Scott Emerson	LNP	19.5 points
Very safe
Condamine	Ray Hopper	LNP v KAP	20.1 points
Currumbin	Jann Stuckey	LNP	20.2 points
Glass House	Andrew Powell	LNP	20.4 points
Clayfield	Tim Nicholls	LNP	20.4 points
Maroochydore	Fiona Simpson	LNP	20.6 points
Redlands	Peter Dowling	LNP	20.9 points
Caloundra	Mark McArdle	LNP	21.2 points
Toowoomba South	John McVeigh	LNP	21.6 points
Aspley	Tracy Davis	LNP	21.7 points
Hervey Bay	Ted Sorensen	LNP	21.7 points
Coomera	Michael Crandon	LNP	23.3 points
Moggill	Bruce Flegg	LNP	23.9 points
Warrego	Howard Hobbs	LNP v IND	25.1 points
Gregory	Vaughan Johnson	LNP	25.5 points
Noosa	Glen Elmes	LNP v GRN	25.5 points
Mudgeeraba	Ros Bates	LNP	25.9 points
Buderim	Steve Dickson	LNP	26.0 points
Mermaid Beach	Ray Stevens	LNP	26.0 points
Kawana	Jarrod Bleijie	LNP	26.3 points
Surfers Paradise	John-Paul Langbroek	LNP	29.5 points
Southern Downs	Lawrence Springborg	LNP v KAP	29.8 points

Labor seats
Marginal
Mackay	Tim Mulherin	ALP	0.5 points
Mulgrave	Curtis Pitt	ALP	1.1 points
Bundamba	Jo-Ann Miller	ALP	1.8 points
Rockhampton	Bill Byrne	ALP	3.9 points
South Brisbane	Anna Bligh	ALP	4.7 points
Woodridge	Desley Scott	ALP	5.8 points
Fairly safe
Inala	Annastacia Palaszczuk	ALP	6.9 points
Katter's Australian Party
Mount Isa	Rob Katter	KAP v LNP	10.0 points
Dalrymple	Shane Knuth	KAP v LNP	15.2 points
Independents
Nicklin	Peter Wellington	IND v LNP	4.9 points
Gladstone	Liz Cunningham	IND v ALP	14.0 points
