= 2009 Queensland state election =

- 21 March 2009

All 89 seats in the Legislative Assembly of Queensland 45 Assembly seats were needed for a majority
- Turnout: 90.93 (▲0.46 pp)
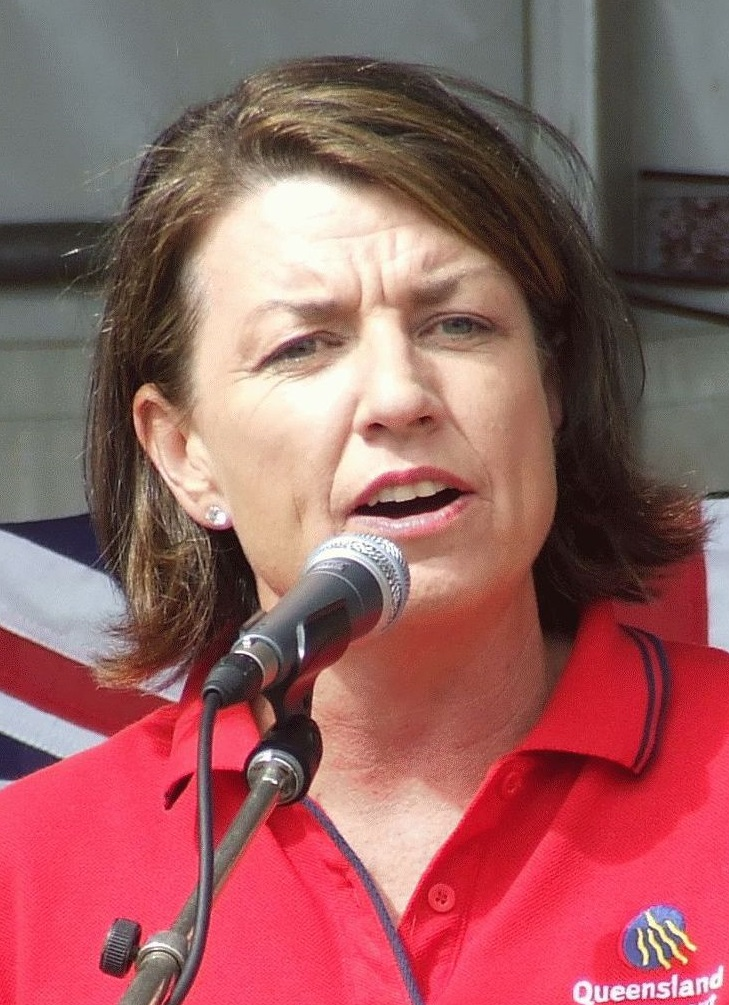

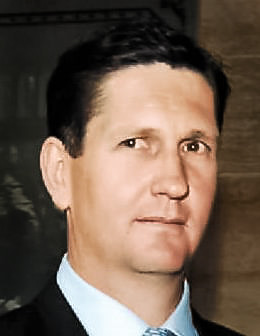
	First party	Second party	Third party
			ON
Leader	Anna Bligh	Lawrence Springborg	Rosa Lee Long
Party	Labor	Liberal National	One Nation
Leader since	13 September 2007	21 January 2008	7 February 2004
Leader's seat	South Brisbane	Southern Downs	Tablelands (seat abolished); Dalrymple (contested unsuccessfully)
Last election	59 seats, 46.92%	25 seats, 37.92% (Note: Of the combined totals of the National and Liberal parties.)	1 seat, 0.60%
Seats won	51 seats	34 seats	0
Seat change	▼8	▲9	▼1
Popular vote	1,002,415	987,018	9,038
Percentage	42.25%	41.60%	0.38%
Swing	▼4.67	▲3.68	▼0.22
TPP	50.9%	49.1%
TPP swing	▼4.1	▲4.1
- Winning margin by electorate.
Premier before election
Anna Bligh
Labor
Elected Premier
Anna Bligh
Labor

The 2009 Queensland state election was held on 21 March 2009 to elect all 89 members of the Legislative Assembly, a unicameral parliament.

The election saw the incumbent Labor government led by Premier Anna Bligh defeat the Liberal National Party of Queensland led by Opposition Leader Lawrence Springborg, and gain a fifth consecutive term in office for her party. Bligh thus became the first female Premier of any Australian state elected in her own right.

This was the first election contested by the LNP following its creation with the merger of the National and Liberal parties.

The 2009 election marked the eighth consecutive victory of Labor in a general election since 1989, although it was out of office between 1996 and 1998 as a direct result of the 1996 Mundingburra by-election.

== Background ==
The Labor Party, led by Premier Anna Bligh, and the LNP, led by Opposition Leader Lawrence Springborg, were the two main parties in Queensland at the election. It was the first election contested by the LNP following its creation with the merger of the National and Liberal parties. At the previous election, Labor won 59 seats, the Nationals won 17 seats, the Liberals won eight seats, One Nation won one seat, and independents won four seats. Former Labor MP Ronan Lee joined the Greens in 2008, thus becoming their parliamentary leader. Lee lost his seat at the election.

A redistribution saw Labor notionally pick up three seats. Therefore, the LNP notionally needed to pick up 22 seats rather than 20 seats to form a majority government, which equated to an unchanged uniform 8.3 percent two-party-preferred swing.

Former Premier Peter Beattie resigned in September 2007, which triggered the October 2007 Brisbane Central by-election.

== Key dates ==
Date	Event
23 February 2009	Writs were issued by the Governor to proceed with an election.
28 February 2009	Close of electoral rolls
3 March 2009	Close of nominations
21 March 2009	Polling day, between the hours of 8am and 6pm
26 March 2009	The Bligh Ministry was reconstituted
7 April 2009	The writ was returned and the results formally declared
12 April 2009	53rd Parliament convened

== Electoral redistribution ==
A redistribution of electoral boundaries occurred in 2008.

The electorates of Charters Towers, Cunningham, Darling Downs, Fitzroy, Kurwongbah, Mount Gravatt, Robina, and Tablelands were abolished.

The electorates of Buderim, Condamine, Coomera, Dalrymple, Mermaid Beach, Morayfield, Pine Rivers, and Sunnybank were created.

The redistribution merged Charters Towers with Tablelands to create the notionally National-held Dalrymple, Fitzroy into Mirani, and Cunningham with Darling Downs to create the notionally National-held Condamine, all in regional Queensland. Notionally Liberal-held Buderim was created on the Sunshine Coast, notionally Labor-held Morayfield in the corridor north of Brisbane, and notionally Labor-held Coomera was created on the Gold Coast. Kurwongbah was renamed Pine Rivers, Mount Gravatt was renamed Sunnybank, and Robina was renamed Mermaid Beach. Burdekin, Clayfield, and Mirani became notionally Labor-held, while Glass House became notionally National-held.

The changes resulted in 62 notionally Labor-held seats, 8 notionally Liberal-held seats, 15 notionally National-held seats, and 4 notionally Independent-held seats. All Liberal-held and National-held seats became Liberal National-held seats.

== Retiring members ==
=== Labor ===
- Chris Bombolas MP (Chatsworth) – Announced 19 February 2009
- Gary Fenlon MP (Greenslopes) – Announced 15 February 2009
- Ken Hayward MP (Kallangur)
- Linda Lavarch MP (Kurwongbah)
- Jim Pearce MP (Fitzroy)
- Warren Pitt MP (Mulgrave) – Announced 17 February 2009
- Pat Purcell MP (Bulimba)
- Mike Reynolds MP (Townsville) – Announced 15 February 2009
- Rod Welford MP (Everton)

=== Liberal National ===
- Kev Lingard MP (Beaudesert)

== Results ==
Winning party by electorate.

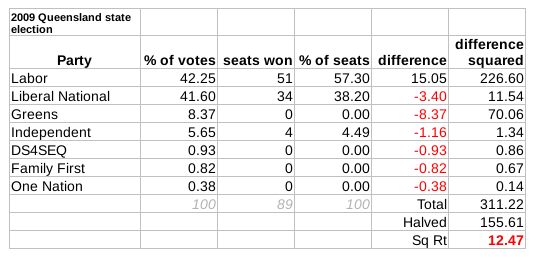
The Gallagher Index result: 12.47

Party	Votes	%	+/–	Seats	+/–
Labor	1,002,415	42.25	▼4.67	51	▼8
Liberal National	987,018	41.60	▲3.68	34	▲9
Greens	198,475	8.37	▲0.38	0	0
Independents	134,156	5.65	▲0.97	4	0
DS4SEQ	22,170	0.93	New	0	New
Family First	19,379	0.82	▼1.07	0	0
One Nation	9,038	0.38	▼0.22	0	▼1
Total	2,372,651	100.00	–	89	–
Valid votes	2,372,651	98.06			
Invalid/blank votes	46,908	1.94	▼0.14		
Total votes	2,419,559	100.00	–		
Registered voters/turnout	2,660,940	90.93	▲0.46		
Two-party-preferred
Labor		50.9	▼4.1		
Liberal National		49.1	▲4.1		
Total					

Popular vote
Labor	42.45%
LNP	41.60%
Greens	8.37%
DS4SEQ	0.93%
Family First	0.82%
One Nation	0.38%
Independents	5.65%

Two-party preferred vote
Labor	50.9%
LNP	49.1%

Seats
Labor	57.30%
LNP	38.20%
Independents	4.49%

== Seats changing hands ==
Seat	2008 Redistribution			Swing	2009 Election		
Seat	Party	Member	Margin	Swing	Margin	Member	Party
Aspley	Labor	Bonny Barry	3.0	-7.46	4.46	Tracy Davis	Liberal National
Burdekin	Labor	notional	0.9	-4.05	3.15	Rosemary Menkens	Liberal National
Clayfield	Labor	notional	0.3	-6.14	5.84	Tim Nicholls	Liberal National
Cleveland	Labor	Phil Weightman	1.2	-1.48	0.28	Mark Robinson	Liberal National
Coomera	Labor	notional	8.3	-10.21	1.91	Michael Crandon	Liberal National
Gaven	Labor	Phil Gray	3.2	-3.92	0.72	Alex Douglas	Liberal National
Hervey Bay	Labor	Andrew McNamara	2.1	-8.60	6.50	Ted Sorensen	Liberal National
Indooroopilly	Labor	Ronan Lee¹	2.7	-8.57	5.87	Scott Emerson	Liberal National
Mirani	Labor	Jim Pearce	1.2	-1.79	0.59	Ted Malone	Liberal National
Mudgeeraba	Labor	Dianne Reilly	2.7	-6.62	3.92	Ros Bates	Liberal National
Redlands	Labor	John English	6.7	-6.77	0.07	Peter Dowling	Liberal National

- Members listed in italics did not contest their seat at this election.
- ¹ Ronan Lee was elected as a member of the Labor Party, but resigned and joined the Greens.
- The Liberal National Party retained the seat of Glass House which had a notional Liberal National margin.

== Post-election pendulum ==
Government seats
Marginal
Chatsworth	Steve Kilburn	ALP	0.14%
Everton	Murray Watt	ALP	1.39%
Broadwater	Peta-Kaye Croft	ALP	2.03%
Cook	Jason O'Brien	ALP	2.24%
Barron River	Steve Wettenhall	ALP	2.32%
Toowoomba North	Kerry Shine	ALP	3.22%
Whitsunday	Jan Jarratt	ALP	3.24%
Southport	Peter Lawlor	ALP	3.48%
Townsville	Mandy Johnstone	ALP	4.02%
Springwood	Barbara Stone	ALP	4.08%
Cairns	Desley Boyle	ALP	4.15%
Mansfield	Phil Reeves	ALP	4.39%
Ferny Grove	Geoff Wilson	ALP	4.49%
Pine Rivers	Carolyn Male	ALP	4.61%
Kallangur	Mary-Anne O'Neill	ALP	4.63%
Mount Ommaney	Julie Attwood	ALP	4.79%
Burleigh	Christine Smith	ALP	4.90%
Pumicestone	Carryn Sullivan	ALP	4.99%
Mount Coot-tha	Andrew Fraser	ALP	5.25%
Redcliffe	Lillian van Litsenburg	ALP	5.57%
Mount Isa	Betty Kiernan	ALP	5.72%
Brisbane Central	Grace Grace	ALP	5.97%
Fairly Safe
Albert	Margaret Keech	ALP	6.47%
Mundingburra	Lindy Nelson-Carr	ALP	6.59%
Greenslopes	Cameron Dick	ALP	6.94%
Ashgrove	Kate Jones	ALP	7.10%
Murrumba	Dean Wells	ALP	7.21%
Stafford	Stirling Hinchliffe	ALP	7.29%
Keppel	Paul Hoolihan	ALP	7.62%
Bulimba	Di Farmer	ALP	7.77%
Mulgrave	Curtis Pitt	ALP	8.08%
Thuringowa	Craig Wallace	ALP	8.47%
Yeerongpilly	Simon Finn	ALP	8.73%
Morayfield	Mark Ryan	ALP	9.13%
Algester	Karen Struthers	ALP	9.21%
Stretton	Stephen Robertson	ALP	9.48%
Ipswich West	Wayne Wendt	ALP	9.55%
Capalaba	Michael Choi	ALP	9.67%
Safe
Sunnybank	Judy Spence	ALP	10.79%
Lytton	Paul Lucas	ALP	12.21%
Sandgate	Vicky Darling	ALP	12.37%
Logan	John Mickel	ALP	13.93%
Nudgee	Neil Roberts	ALP	14.26%
South Brisbane	Anna Bligh	ALP	15.01%
Waterford	Evan Moorhead	ALP	16.46%
Ipswich	Rachel Nolan	ALP	16.71%
Mackay	Tim Mulherin	ALP	16.72%
Rockhampton	Robert Schwarten	ALP	17.92%
Very Safe
Bundamba	Jo-Ann Miller	ALP	21.23%
Inala	Annastacia Palaszczuk	ALP	21.53%
Woodridge	Desley Scott	ALP	25.37%

Non-government seats
Marginal
Redlands	Peter Dowling	LNP	0.07%
Cleveland	Mark Robinson	LNP	0.28%
Mirani	Ted Malone	LNP	0.59%
Gaven	Alex Douglas	LNP	0.72%
Coomera	Michael Crandon	LNP	1.91%
Burdekin	Rosemary Menkens	LNP	3.15%
Mudgeeraba	Ros Bates	LNP	3.92%
Aspley	Tracy Davis	LNP	4.46%
Dalrymple	Shane Knuth	LNP	5.18% v ONP
Glass House	Andrew Powell	LNP	5.81%
Clayfield	Tim Nicholls	LNP	5.84%
Indooroopilly	Scott Emerson	LNP	5.87%
Fairly Safe
Bundaberg	Jack Dempsey	LNP	6.02%
Caloundra	Mark McArdle	LNP	6.20%
Hervey Bay	Ted Sorensen	LNP	6.50%
Currumbin	Jann Stuckey	LNP	6.89%
Kawana	Jarrod Bleijie	LNP	6.93%
Lockyer	Ian Rickuss	LNP	7.61%
Toowoomba South	Mike Horan	LNP	8.22%
Beaudesert	Aidan McLindon	LNP	8.31%
Safe
Mermaid Beach	Ray Stevens	LNP	10.81%
Burnett	Rob Messenger	LNP	11.10%
Moggill	Bruce Flegg	LNP	11.28%
Condamine	Ray Hopper	LNP	11.56% v IND
Maroochydore	Fiona Simpson	LNP	12.80%
Gregory	Vaughan Johnson	LNP	14.26%
Buderim	Steve Dickson	LNP	14.28%
Hinchinbrook	Andrew Cripps	LNP	14.69%
Surfers Paradise	John-Paul Langbroek	LNP	16.52%
Callide	Jeff Seeney	LNP	19.36%
Noosa	Glen Elmes	LNP	19.85%
Very Safe
Southern Downs	Lawrence Springborg	LNP	21.08%
Warrego	Howard Hobbs	LNP	24.38%
Gympie	David Gibson	LNP	27.21%
Crossbench seats
Nanango	Dorothy Pratt	IND	2.90% v LNP
Gladstone	Liz Cunningham	IND	6.13% v ALP
Nicklin	Peter Wellington	IND	16.31% v LNP
Maryborough	Chris Foley	IND	16.83% v LNP

== Subsequent changes ==
- On 5 May 2010, Aidan McLindon (Beaudesert) and Rob Messenger (Burnett) resigned from the Liberal National Party. On 11 October 2011, Aidan McLindon joined Katter's Australian Party.
- On 31 October 2011, Shane Knuth (Dalrymple) resigned from the Liberal National Party and joined the Katter's Australian Party.

== Polling ==
Newspoll polling was conducted via random telephone number selection in city and country areas. Sampling sizes usually consist of around 1000 electors, with the declared margin of error at around ±3 percent.

Better Premier ratings^
Date	Labor Bligh	Coalition/LNP Springborg
18 – 19 Mar 2009	53%	33%
27 Feb – 8 Mar 2009	48%	34%
Jan – Feb 2009	48%	31%
Oct – Dec 2008	49%	30%
Jul – Sep 2008	53%	27%
Apr – Jun 2008	60%	24%
Jan – Mar 2008	64%	18%
Oct – Dec 2007	66%	11%^{2}
Jul – Sep 2007	54%^{1}	25%^{2}
Apr – Jun 2007	54%^{1}	19%^{2}
Pre 2006 election	58%^{1}	28%
Pre 2004 election	62%^{1}	22%
Polling conducted by Newspoll and published in The Australian.^ Remainder were "uncommitted" to either leader.^{1} Peter Beattie, ^{2} Jeff Seeney

Legislative Assembly opinion polling
	Political parties							Two party preferred
Dates	ALP	Lib	Nat	LNP	Grn	FFP	Oth	ALP	LNP
18 – 19 Mar 2009	42%			42%	7%	0.5%	8%	49.9%	50.1%
27 Feb – 8 Mar 2009	41%			43%	8%	<0.5%	8%	49%	51%
Jan – Feb 2009	42%			41%	7%	<0.5%	10%	53%	47%
Oct – Dec 2008	45%			37%	8%	<0.5%	10%	57%	43%
Jul – Sep 2008	38%			41%	9%	1%	11%	51%	49%
Apr – Jun 2008	43%	26%	12%	38%	10%	<0.5%	9%	55%	45%
Jan – Mar 2008	50%	22%	10%	32%	8%	<0.5%	10%	60%	40%
Oct – Dec 2007	50%	26%	9%	35%	6%	1%	8%	59%	41%
Jul – Sep 2007	50%	21%	12%	33%	5%	2%	10%	59%	41%
Apr – Jun 2007	51%	20%	11%	31%	6%	1%	11%	61%	39%
2006 election	46.9%	20.1%	17.8%	37.9%	8.0%	1.9%	5.3%	55.0%	45.0%
6 – 7 Sep 2006	48%	21%	17%	38%	4%	1%	9%	55%	45%
2004 election	47%	18.5%	17%	35.5%	6.7%	4.9%	5.9%	55.5%	44.5%
Polling conducted by Newspoll and published in The Australian.

== See also ==
- Candidates of the 2009 Queensland state election
- Members of the Queensland Legislative Assembly, 2006–2009
- Members of the Queensland Legislative Assembly, 2009–2012
- 2009 Liberal National Party of Queensland leadership election
