= Electoral district of Kurwongbah =

State electoral district of Queensland, Australia

Kurwongbah Queensland—Legislative Assembly
- Map of Kurwongbah, 2017
- State: Queensland
- Dates current: 1992–2009, 2017–present
- MP: Shane King
- Party: Labor Party
- Namesake: Lake Kurwongbah
- Electors: 36,693 (2020)
- Area: 125 km^{2} (48.3 sq mi)
- Demographic: Outer-metropolitan
- Coordinates: 27.2177°S 152.9390°E
Electorates around Kurwongbah:
Glass House	Morayfield	Bancroft
Pine Rivers	Kurwongbah	Bancroft
Pine Rivers	Pine Rivers	Murrumba

Kurwongbah is an electoral district of the Legislative Assembly in the Australian state of Queensland which existed at first from 1992 to 2009, and was re-introduced for the 2017 state election. It is named after Lake Kurwongbah.The district is based in the City of Moreton Bay.

== First incarnation ==
The first incarnation of the electoral district of Kurwongbah included the suburbs of Kurwongbah, Bray Park, Eatons Hill, Samsonvale and Strathpine. The seat was first contested at the 1992 state election, essentially as a reconfigured version of Pine Rivers.

In 2008, Kurwongbah was abolished—with effect at the 2009 state election—as a result of the redistribution undertaken by the Electoral Commission of Queensland. It was replaced by a recreated Pine Rivers, which is very similar in form to the old Kurwongbah.

== Second incarnation ==
In the 2017 redistribution, Kurwongbah was created again, largely replacing the abolished seat of Kallangur. However, as the suburb of Kallangur is not in the new electorate, the electoral district needed to be renamed. It was named Kurwongbah after Lake Kurwongbah.

From results of the 2015 state election, Kurwongbah was estimated to be a safe seat for the Labor Party with a margin of 7.1% coming into the 2017 state election. The prediction was accurate as Labor won the seat.

== Members for Kurwongbah ==
First incarnation (1992–2009)
Member	Party	Term
Margaret Woodgate	Labor	1992–1997
Linda Lavarch	Labor	1997–2009
Second incarnation (2017–present)
Member	Party	Term
Shane King	Labor	2017–present

== Election results ==
2024 Queensland state election: Kurwongbah
Party	Candidate	Votes	%	±%
Labor	Shane King	15,596	43.36	−8.43
Liberal National	Tanya McKewen	12,123	33.70	+6.72
Greens	Jordan Martin	3,006	8.36	+0.97
One Nation	Christopher Leech	2,789	7.75	−1.29
Family First	William Ross Pitt	1,575	4.38	+4.38
Animal Justice	Gregory Dillon	883	2.45	−0.06
Total formal votes		35,972	96.39	+0.05
Informal votes		1,347	3.61	−0.05
Turnout		37,319	89.31	+0.59
Two-party-preferred result
Labor	Shane King	20,103	55.89	−7.26
Liberal National	Tanya McKewen	15,869	44.11	+7.26
Labor hold		Swing	−7.26	

== See also ==
- Electoral districts of Queensland
- Members of the Queensland Legislative Assembly by year
- Category:Members of the Queensland Legislative Assembly by name
