= Peter Lawlor =

Australian politician

The Honourable Peter Lawlor

Minister for Tourism and Fair Trading of Queensland
- In office 26 March 2009 – 21 February 2011
- Premier: Anna Bligh
- Preceded by: Desley Boyle
- Succeeded by: Jan Jarratt

Member of the Queensland Parliament for Southport
- In office 17 February 2001 – 24 March 2012
- Preceded by: Mick Veivers
- Succeeded by: Rob Molhoek

Personal details
- Born: 1 March 1948 (age 78) Ayr, Queensland, Australia
- Party: Labor
- Children: 3, including Ali France

Peter Lawlor (born 1 March 1948) is an Australian former politician. He was the Labor Member for Southport in the Queensland Legislative Assembly. He served as Queensland Minister for Tourism and Fair Trading. Prior to his term in state parliament he served as a councillor on the Gold Coast City Council.

== Gold Coast City Council ==
Lawlor served as a Gold Coast City councillor for two terms up to 1994; he chaired the council's planning committee for three years. During his time on council, Lawlor campaigned on environmental issues and to preserve the Gold Coast Broadwater.

At the time Gold Coast City Council had nine aldermen and a mayor. Areas to the north and west of the Gold Coast came under the separate Shire of Albert until the amalgamation of the council and shire in 1995.

In March 1988 Lawlor was elected as Division 3 alderman. At the same election new Mayor Alderman Lex Bell ousted former Mayor Denis Pie. Lex Bell went on to be elected as the independent member for Surfers Paradise at a by-election in 2001 soon after Lawlor's own election to parliament.

Lawlor and Bell were both re-elected in the March 1991 election for a second term. At this election the previously all-male aldermen were joined by three new women aldermen.

As alderman for the Southport area, Lawlor campaigned for the preservation of The Spit as "one of the few undeveloped areas on the Gold Coast". Lawlor blamed the previous Waterways Authority and previous state government for approving resorts that the council did not want to go ahead, neither had required council approval. Vacant land to the south of the Sea World car park was zoned as special purposes under the draft development control plan and could have been developed with a low-rise resort or international hotel. Chairman of the Finance Committee of Gold Coast City Council was concerned about valid compensation claims against the council from developers if previous approvals were revoked now that they came under council control.

Lawlor, Bell and Gary Baildon were the only three aldermen to vote against the amalgamation of Gold Coast City and Albert Shire.

In 1996 after Bell and Lawlor had been ousted by the new Ray Stevens administration, Stevens proposed a relocation of the Gold Coast Indy Grand Prix from Surfers Paradise to Southport. Lawlor teamed up with the new premier, Rob Borbidge, together with local National Party MP and racing driver Allan Grice to oppose the proposed relocation. As the former Planning Committee chairman, Lawlor said that the previous council had decreed that no further commercial development or reclamation of the Broadwater would take place. Mayor Stevens responded that the policy direction of the previous council was irrelevant. Borgidge indicated that the state government would never support the proposal to reclaim any part of the Broadwater.

=== Chair of the Planning and Development Committee ===
Lawlor served as the chair of the Planning and Development Committee from 1991 until he left council in 1994. This period of time was within a national recession however he held the view that "The Gold Coast has always been the last place to be affected by recessions and the first to recover..." Environmental protection was a theme to come from his time as Committee Chair.

As the council Planning and Development Committee chairman, Alderman Lawlor lad a plan for Southport to become a future CBD heartland of the Gold Coast which would be supported by regional district and local centres appropriately located throughout the urban area. At the time 159 ha of the 317 ha of zoned commercial land in Southport was vacant. Council lobbied for the creation of a state government precinct in Southport.

Another victory claimed by Lawlor on behalf of the council was the 1992 prevention of commercial development proposals for Crown land on South Stradbroke Island, including a golf course by Christopher Skase. Several hundreds of hectares of land were rezoned for environmental use after a five-year council battle. The vacant Crown land on the island was declared an environmental park under joint trusteeship of the council and the National Parks and Wildlife Service. Meanwhile, in 1991 council acquired 4ha of privately owned land near the southernmost tip of the island and had it rezoned to public open space.

In 1993 council tightened the town plan to outlaw prostitution in residential areas. At the time prostitution with two or more operators were banned by state law but single operators were not covered, until then council had gained prosecutions against prostitution by deeming it a business activity in a residential area. The new town plan specifically defined and excluded prostitution from being a home occupation from residential areas.

== Southport ==
The Electoral District of Southport is based in the northern part of the Gold Coast. It is named for the largest suburb within the electorate of Southport, and also includes the suburbs of Arundel, Ernest, Labrador, Molendinar and Parkwood. It was re-created for the 1977 election after having been a previous electoral district throughout the 1950s. The suburb of Southport was named so because it was the southernmost port of the colony of Queensland.

Lawlor has been the Labor-endorsed candidate for the Southport Electoral District at every state election since 1992. He marginally lost the 1992, 1995 and 1998 elections against the long term incumbent National Party Member Mick Veivers. Veivers was Minister for Emergency Services and Sport in the Borbidge Government and had been a Rugby League international before being elected to the seat in 1987. Lawlor finally succeeded in gaining the seat from Veivers on behalf of the Labor Party in 2001 with over 60% of the two party preferred vote and maintained that high margin until a swing against him in the 2009 election brought his share of the vote down to 53.48%.

=== Candidate ===
As a sitting Alderman and local solicitor Lawlor (44) ran for the Electoral District of Southport for the first time in 1992 as a candidate for the incumbent Labor Goss Government. Sitting National Party Member Mick Veivers had a 5% margin, the Liberal Party also ran candidate Tim Baker who had previously been a teacher at The Southport School. Veivers' margin was reduced to 2.3% with Lawlor attracting 45% of the primary vote, the conservative opposition won six of the eight Gold Coast electoral districts.

In the lead up to the 1995 election Veivers argued that his small margin was only "on paper" as this campaign would not be a three-cornered contest involving both major conservative parties. Issues raised during the campaign included a government proposed Gold Coast tolled motorway with the Opposition promising an alternative 18 month upgrade to the highway. Additionally Lawlor raised issues of education, crime and health care, he also emphasised that having a local member in the ruling government was the way to capture public funds. During the campaign Veivers' campaign distributed leaflets in the Southport electorate saying that Labor and the Democrats wanted to legalise homosexuals marrying, adopting children and holding mardi gras parades in Southport. Opposition Leader and Member for Surfers Paradise expressed his concerns to Veivers about the leaflets. Veivers said that he was not "poofter-bashing" but was speaking out against militant homosexuals who wanted to force their ideas on everyone. Lawlor said that these issues were not on the agenda, that it was dirty politics and that it misrepresented the facts and Labor policy, "it is absolute lies". Veivers increased his primary vote to 51.7%, the first time Southport had been won on primary votes, however he still only had a 4.81% two party preferred margin. The Gold Coast conservatives all retained their seats with large swings towards them.

The Goss Government was re-elected with a one-seat majority however after a by-election in North Queensland Bob Borbidge was able to form a minority government. Merri Rose was the only Labor Party Member based on the Gold Coast and Premier Borbidge was a local himself. The election was unusual and difficult to predict because the One Nation Party had gained significant momentum locally and across the state. Labor focused the bulk of its Gold Coast campaign funds into Lawlor's campaign for Southport. The Southport area was seen to be a traditional Labor area and local Member Mick Veivers was now a Minister.

The Borbidge Government retained all their seats on the Gold Coast in 1998 however they lost seats elsewhere and the one term government fell to the Labor Party. Peter Beattie became the new Premier, sole Gold Coast MP Rose became the Tourism Minister. Between 1998 and the 2001 election the minority Beattie Government held a knife edge majority in the Parliament relying on an independent.

=== Election ===
The 2001 Labor election campaign was dominated by the leader Premier Beattie, voters were told to "just vote 1" in a tactic to deprive the conservatives of the benefit from One Nation preferences.

Controversially Veivers entered into a local preference deal with the One Nation Party for a second time. One Nation had attracted 21.7% of the Southport vote at the 1998 election. Veivers recommended that Southport voters give the One Nation candidate their second preference ahead of both Lawlor and an independent candidate, this deal was in defiance of a ban on such preference deals by Opposition Leader Rob Borbidge. Days before the election Borbidge announced that Veivers would head a bid for the 2010 World Expo which provided a last minute boost for the veteran MP.

Lawlor defeated Veivers on 17 February 2001 becoming the first non-conservative politician to be elected to the Electoral District. He was one of 66 Labor candidates elected as part of a landslide swing towards the Government. On the Gold Coast Labor won seven of nine electorates, previously they had only had one Government Member.

Lawlor's 2001 campaign office was run by his daughter Jane and his campaign manager was Terry Callaghan. He won all 14 electoral booths with 50.9% of the primary vote (11 245 votes) and 60.8% of the two party preferred vote. These results were a 14.1% primary vote swing toward Lawlor and a 13.9% two party preferred swing against the sitting Member Mick Veivers.

=== Member ===
In his inaugural speech to the Queensland Parliament Lawlor identified a Gold Coast light rail system as the answer to the high growth in local population and traffic, indicating that roads and cars alone could not be relied upon, he attacked the Howard federal government for not supporting the project. The Gold Coast Broadwater was named as "the greatest natural asset of Southport" which needed protection. Lawlor attacked the previous Borbidge government for approving a horizon tank for film making that was to be constructed on public land at the Southport Spit.

In early 2002 Lawlor and Member for Broadwater Peta-Kaye Croft started a campaign opposing a Gold Coast City Council document titled "Harbour Vision 2020", Lawlor estimated that a petition he started on the issue had attracted 1000 signatures in 10 days. The petitioners opposed commercial development on Wave Break Island, the western foreshore and any reclamation. Lawlor criticised on environmental and engineering grounds any possibility of a new bridge being built to Wave Break Island and a possible cruise ship facility on the island. As a former councillor himself, Lawlor criticised the council on leadership saying that such an important document should not have been left to bureaucrats to write. "The monkeys are taking over the zoo" he said. In March 2002 Lawlor publicly supported a proposal to develop a cruise-ship terminal at the northern end of The Spit, the terminal plan was identified by Lawlor as being in the Seaway and not the Broadwater. Both the Gold Coast Bulletin and local Councillor Dawn Crichlow were critical of the perceived about-face. Later that year the State Government ruled out allowing any bridge across the Broadwater to Wave Break Island. The Mayor Gary Baildon attributed the decision to Lawlor's election commitments and subsequent campaign against Harbour Visions 2020.

In the 2004 election he maintained his majority from 2001 against National Party challenger Bob Bennett, a former senior police officer and brother of Brisbane Broncos coach Wayne Bennett. 2004 was to be the last time the One Nation Party contested the seat. Lawlor attracted 54.1% of the primary vote, an increase of 3.2% and maintained his two party preferred result of 60%. The Courier-Mail speculated that Lawlor was a front-runner for a Cabinet position immediately after the election but Margaret Keech, the Member for Albert was promoted.

Bennett again challenged Lawlor for the Nationals in the 2006 election. The Government's popularity on the Gold Coast was effected in the lead up to the election by a proposed cruise ship terminal proposed for the Southport Spit. Premier Peter Beattie made two major Gold Coast election announcements in the first week of the campaign; cancelling the cruise ship terminal project on environmental grounds and increasing local hospital upgrade plans from 500 beds for $500 million to 750 beds for $1.23 billion. The local electoral results were very similar to 2004, Lawlor maintained 53.3% of the primary vote and 59.1% of the two party preferred vote giving him a 9.1% margin.

An electoral redistribution reduced Lawlor's majority down to 8% when the Southport electoral district was moved slightly southward. Lawlor was challenged in the 2009 election by five other candidates including local marketing and management consultant Tinia Wright for the newly merged Liberal National Party (LNP) opposition and also Brian Morris of the Daylight Saving for South East Queensland Party. The Gold Coast Bulletin criticised the LNP for not matching a Government promise of a $60 million stadium upgrade and a tourism package that promised equal funding to the Gold Coast and Mount Isa. The LNP used the stadium upgrade as a key election issue and emphasised a contrasting priority of transport and health on the Gold Coast. Two days from the election internal polling by The Australian predicted a swing of 8–10% against Lawlor. Lawlor was re-elected with a reduced majority, he achieved 45.33% of the primary vote and 53.48% of the two party preferred vote.

== Parliament ==
Lawlor has been identified as being a Parliamentarian with a quick wit, his one-liners have enlivened a number of parliamentary sessions.

Lawlor's first stoush in Parliament was with Opposition racing spokesman Howard Hobbs over an alleged forged document the opposition had tabled in parliament which was a draft letter from the Queensland Principal Club, Lawlor accused Hobbs of misleading the House by not checking the letter's authenticity. Soon after Lawlor named a Gold Coast man as the mastermind of an international scam purporting to supply humanitarian aid, promising investors returns of 10 to 40 per cent the scam duped Australians and New Zealanders of over $6 million.

In July 2002 Bob Quinn had an unusual advocate in Lawlor, who made an impassioned speech in Parliament in support of the Liberal Leader, Lawlor told the Parliament of a plan by "branch stackers" in the Liberal Party to drive Quinn out of politics. Lawlor said that he had known Quinn for over 40 years and he was an honest and conscientious person. Allegations were raised of ethnic branch stacking on the Gold Coast within the Liberal Party using the federal Division of Fadden as an example where he alleged 50 Vietnamese had suddenly joined the Springwood business branch as pensioners or students, non of whom lived within the electoral division. The next week Peter Beattie followed suit and mocked the Liberal Leader in Parliament saying that he was his number one supporter.

In 2003 long-term friend and fellow turf club icon Peter Gallagher (66) died after a six-month battle with cancer. Lawlor wept in State Parliament as Premier Beattie spoke about his achievements, Lawlor went on to give a long speech in honour of his close friend who he had known his whole life.

The Palm Island Select Committee was formed in April 2005 after a death in custody and riot on Palm Island was a bipartisan committee chaired by Lawlor. The committee recommended:

- Appointment of a resource officer to liaise with government
- Examine the need to appoint a financial controller for the Palm Island Council
- Pursue transferring ownership of the Palm Island retail store from Government
- Grant long-term leases to encourage home ownership
- Address the housing shortage
- Develop an education precinct
- Establishing library services
- Stage a career expo each year
- Completion of infrastructure work relating to sea transport services
- Carry out a suicide audit
- Establishment of a community and cultural centre
- Improve cultural awareness training for police
- Establishment of a safe house for young people
- Finalise an Alcohol Management Plan

== Minister ==
On 24 March 2009 after the reelection of the Bligh Labor government, the Premier announced that Lawlor would be one of eight Members to be promoted to the Cabinet as a Minister. Lawlor was sworn in by the Governor as the Minister for Tourism and Fair Trading on 26 March 2009. The ministerial portfolio of Tourism and Fair Trading holds responsibility for tourism, fair trading, charities, occupational licensing, art unions, Golden Casket, casinos, machine gaming, liquor licensing and racing.

In a high-profile interview for The Courier-Mail, new Opposition Leader and Member for Surfers Paradise John-Paul Langbroek used Lawlor as an example of how he did not have enmity with anyone, even his political opponents, by stating "for instance, I like Peter Lawlor... he is a true believer in the Labor ideals, so I admire him for that."

In becoming the new Tourism Minister Lawlor told The Cairns Post that tourism was the lifeblood of both Cairns and the Gold Coast and that he would fly to Cairns and meet with stakeholders as soon as possible to learn more about issues in the far north. Lawlor became Tourism Minister during the 2008 financial crisis.

Body corporate fees structures were challenged in March 2010 by Lawlor in new legislation which prevents penthouse owners from spreading their higher body corporate fees onto smaller unit owners. Lawlor described the previous practice as a loophole being taken advantage of, an example was used of The Pinnacle building on Surfers Paradise where a penthouse window was allegedly shot out in 2009 over a body corporate feud over a bid to have the fees of $3million penthouses halved while doubling the fees for smaller, lower-floor units.

A Liquor Licensing staff member anonymously leaked to the Brisbanetimes.com.au in February 2010 that 500 public servant staff from the Office of Liquor Licensing would shift to Ipswich by 2012 under the State Government's decentralisation policy. Lawlor rejected suggestions that there would be a move of 500 public servants by May 2010 and said that it was early stages of consultation and each employee's situation would be looked at on a case-by-case basis.

== Personal life ==
Born 1 March 1948 in North Queensland the eldest of five boys, Lawlor moved to Southport as a small child. Lawlor's family were a self-identified "Labor family". Throughout his childhood in the 1950s and 1960s the family handed out how-to-vote cards in Southport, which was a safe conservative district. In 1962, he attended the local high school, Southport State High, for one year and became the junior athletics champion of the school. He then completed the last three years of high school as a boarder student at Marist Brothers in Ashgrove, Brisbane. After graduation, Lawlor worked for the Commonwealth Bank and studied economics at the University of Queensland, but did not complete the degree.

In the 1970s, Lawlor worked as a clerk for Gold Coast City Council and then travelled to Port Moresby as a customs clerk. After a period working for a small engineering firm in Brisbane he married and moved to work as an accountant in a food franchising company in Durban, South Africa where his first child, Alison, was born. Lawlor and his family then moved to Brisbane where he worked as an accountant in an insurance company. Through the late 70s, he studied law through the Solicitors Board as he could not afford full-time university.

In 1981, he was admitted and became a sole practitioner solicitor until his election to Parliament. As a solicitor, Lawlor was also employed as a consultant to Southport law firm Gall Standfield & Smith.

Lawlor has two daughters and a son, and two grandchildren. All three of his children returned from London and Hong Kong to assist him for his 2001 inaugural victory. One of his daughters, Ali France, entered the Australian Parliament as member for the Division of Dickson in 2025.

He was a committee member of the Gold Coast Turf Club for 15 years, elected at the 2001 AGM as deputy chairman, in a letter to all committee members before the 2002 AGM Lawlor ended speculation and announced that he would not run for chairman as it would be a conflict with his position as the Member for Southport.

He has been involved in numerous sporting clubs including cricket, rugby league, rugby union and Australian rules football.

Parliament of Queensland
Preceded by Mick Veivers	Member for Southport; 2001–2012	Succeeded by Rob Molhoek
