= Rob Molhoek =

Australian politician (born 1959)

Rob Molhoek MP
- Molhoek in 2012

Member of the Queensland Parliament for Southport
- Incumbent
- Assumed office 24 March 2012
- Preceded by: Peter Lawlor

Personal details
- Born: 6 October 1959 (age 66) Southport, Queensland
- Party: Liberal National Party

Robert Molhoek (born 6 October 1959) is an Australian Liberal National politician who is a member of the Legislative Assembly of Queensland for Southport, having defeated Peter Lawlor at the 2012 state election.

He was appointed Assistant Minister for Child Safety on 3 April 2012, and served in this capacity until 20 February 2013 when he was appointed Assistant Minister for Planning Reform. Following the defeat of the Newman Government at the 2015 state election, Molhoek served as Shadow Minister for Housing and Public Works from 20 February 2015 to 10 May 2016. He also served as Opposition Whip from 15 December 2017 to 15 November 2020. He currently serves as a member of the Health and Environment Committee.

Parliament of Queensland
Preceded by Peter Lawlor	Member for Southport; 2012–present	Incumbent
