= Shane King (politician) =

Australian politician; Member of the Queensland Legislative Assembly

Shane King MP
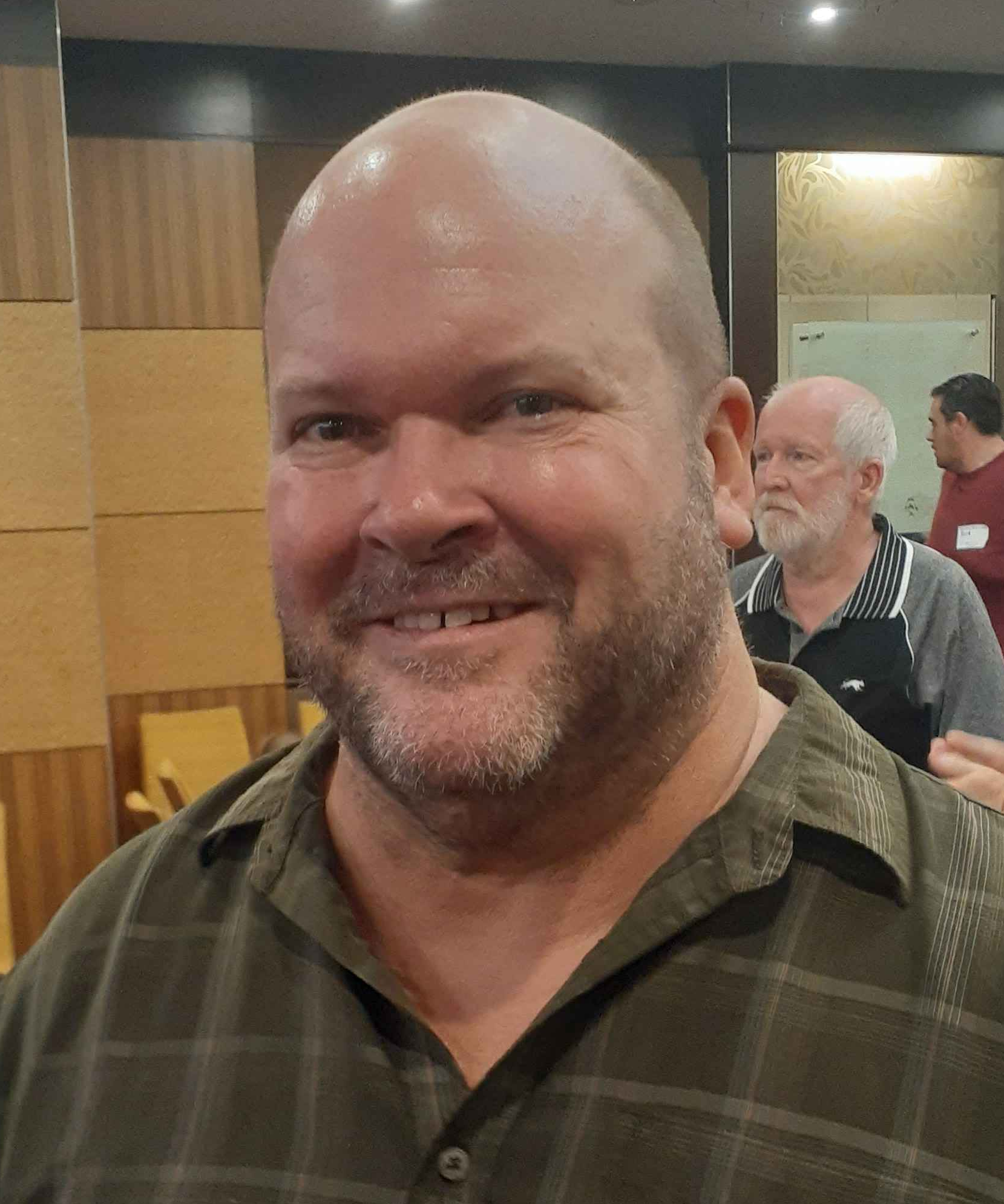
- King at a Labor event in 2024

Member of the Queensland Legislative Assembly for Kallangur
- In office 31 January 2015 – 25 November 2017
- Preceded by: Trevor Ruthenberg
- Succeeded by: Seat abolished

Member of the Queensland Legislative Assembly for Kurwongbah
- Incumbent
- Assumed office 25 November 2017
- Preceded by: New seat

Personal details
- Born: 15 January 1969 (age 57) Brisbane, Queensland
- Party: Labor
- Spouse: Angela King
- Children: 1
- Profession: Electrician
- Website: www.shaneking.net.au

Shane Roderick King (born 15 January 1969) is an Australian politician. He has been the Labor member for Kurwongbah (formerly Kallangur) in the Legislative Assembly of Queensland since 2015.

Shane attended High School at Pine Rivers High before commencing an apprenticeship as an Electrical Fitter Mechanic with QEC (now Powerlink).

He has worked the majority of his life all across Queensland in the Electricity Supply Industry but has also worked in rural and remote Australia for Rio Tinto in their Western Australian Iron Ore mines.

King has tertiary qualifications in Occupational Health and Hygiene as well as Certificate IV qualifications in Frontline Management, Training and Assessing and Workplace Health and Safety. He is a long time Workplace delegate for the Electrical Trade Union, providing advice and guidance to union members.

Since 2015, King has served as Chair of the Utilities, Science and Innovation Committee, Chair of the Transportation and Utilities Committee and Chair of the Public Works and Utilities Committee respectively. He also served as a member of the Parliamentary Crime and Corruption Committee between 2018 and 2019.

Parliament of Queensland
Preceded by Trevor Ruthenberg	Member for Kallangur; 2015–2017	Abolished
New seat	Member for Kurwongbah; 2017–present	Incumbent
