= Michael Crandon =

Australian politician

Michael Crandon MP

Member of the Queensland Legislative Assembly for Coomera
- Incumbent
- Assumed office 21 March 2009
- Preceded by: New seat

Personal details
- Born: 10 December 1953 (age 72) Somerset, United Kingdom
- Party: Liberal National Party of Queensland
- Children: Three
- Profession: Financial planner

Michael John Crandon (born 10 December 1953) is an Australian politician. He was first elected for the seat of Coomera to the Legislative Assembly of Queensland for the Liberal National Party of Queensland at the 2009 Queensland Election.

Parliament of Queensland
New seat	Member for Coomera; 2009–present	Incumbent
