= Electoral district of Southport =

State electoral district of Queensland, Australia

Southport Queensland—Legislative Assembly
- Electoral map of Southport 2017
- State: Queensland
- MP: Rob Molhoek
- Party: Liberal National
- Namesake: Southport
- Electors: 34,899 (2020)
- Area: 33 km^{2} (12.7 sq mi)
- Demographic: Inner-metropolitan
- Coordinates: 27°57′S 153°23′E
Electorates around Southport:
Gaven	Bonney	Surfers Paradise
Gaven	Southport	Surfers Paradise
Gaven	Surfers Paradise	Surfers Paradise

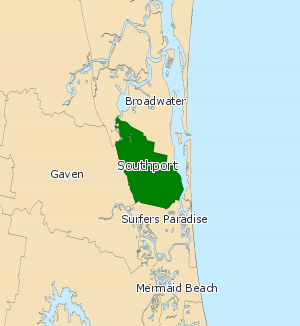
Electoral map of Southport 2008

Southport is an electoral district of the Legislative Assembly in the Australian state of Queensland.

The district is based in the northern part of the Gold Coast. It is named for the suburb of Southport, and also includes the suburbs of Arundel, Labrador, Molendinar and Parkwood. It was first created for the 1977 election.

An earlier district based in the same region was also called Southport. It existed from 1950 to 1960.

== Members for Southport ==
First incarnation (1950–1960)
Member	Party	Term
Eric Gaven	Country	1950–1960
Second incarnation (1977–present)
Member	Party	Term
Peter White	Liberal	1977–1980
Doug Jennings	National	1980–1987
Mick Veivers	National	1987–2001
Peter Lawlor	Labor	2001–2012
Rob Molhoek	Liberal National	2012–present

== Election results ==
2024 Queensland state election: Southport
Party	Candidate	Votes	%	±%
Liberal National	Rob Molhoek	15,183	51.41	+5.81
Labor	Letitia Del Fabbro	8,128	27.52	−6.98
One Nation	David Vaughan	2,581	8.74	+2.84
Greens	Mitch McCausland	2,574	8.71	−0.29
Family First	Ruth Fea	1,069	3.62	+3.62
Total formal votes		29,535	94.85	
Informal votes		1,605	5.15	
Turnout		31,140	84.01	
Two-party-preferred result
Liberal National	Rob Molhoek	18,060	61.15	+5.75
Labor	Letitia Del Fabbro	11,475	38.85	−5.75
Liberal National hold		Swing	+5.75	
