= Andrew Powell (politician) =

Australian politician

The Honourable Andrew Powell MP
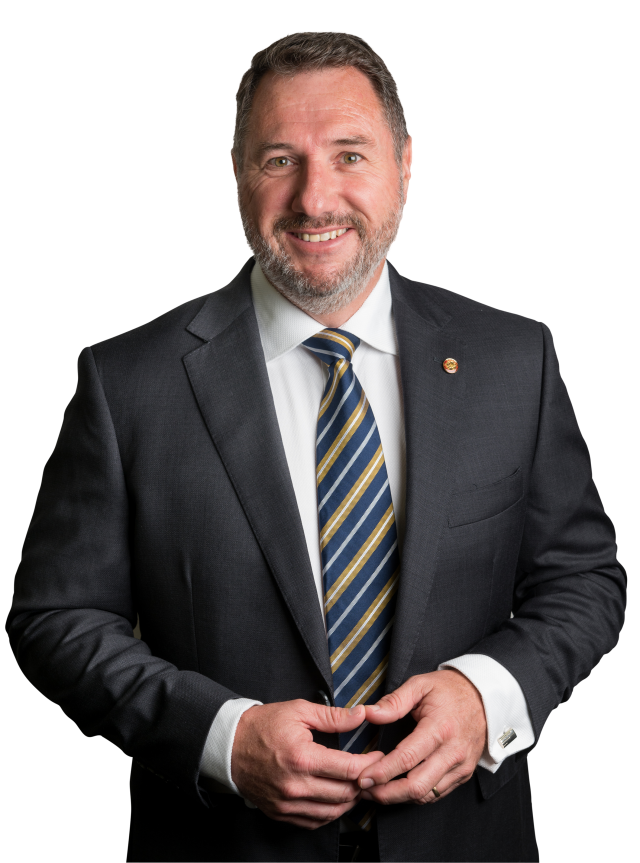

Shadow Minister for State Development, Manufacturing, Infrastructure and Planning
- In office 15 December 2017 – 15 November 2020
- Leader: Deb Frecklington
- Preceded by: Deb Frecklington (State Development and Infrastructure); Ian Walker (Planning)
- Succeeded by: Fiona Simpson (State Development, Infrastructure and Planning); Deb Frecklington (Manufacturing)

Shadow Minister for Transport and Main Roads, Shadow Minister for Local Government
- In office 6 May 2016 – 15 December 2017
- Leader: Tim Nicholls
- Preceded by: Scott Emerson (Transport); Fiona Simpson (Main Roads and Local Government)
- Succeeded by: Steve Minnikin (Transport and Main Roads); Ann Leahy (Local Government)

Shadow Minister for Energy and Water Supply
- In office 14 February 2015 – 6 May 2016
- Leader: Lawrence Springborg
- Preceded by: Curtis Pitt
- Succeeded by: Michael Hart

Minister for the Environment and Heritage Protection of Queensland
- In office 3 April 2012 – 14 February 2015
- Premier: Campbell Newman
- Preceded by: Vicky Darling (Environment)
- Succeeded by: Steven Miles

Shadow Minister for Environment
- In office 11 April 2011 – 19 February 2012
- Leader: Campbell Newman
- Preceded by: Jack Dempsey
- Succeeded by: Bill Byrne

Member of the Queensland Parliament for Glass House
- Incumbent
- Assumed office 21 March 2009
- Preceded by: Carolyn Male

Personal details
- Born: 15 May 1973 (age 53) Melbourne, Victoria, Australia
- Party: Liberal National Party
- Children: 5
- Education: University of Queensland
- Occupation: Public servant

Andrew Cary Powell (born 15 May 1973) is an Australian politician. He was first elected for the seat of Glass House to the Queensland Parliament for the Liberal National Party of Queensland at the 2009 Queensland election.

== Early life ==
Powell was born in Melbourne, but moved to Sydney while in primary school and later to Queensland. He received a Bachelor of Science and a Bachelor of Arts from the University of Queensland in 1995, and a Certificate III in Public Administration from the Department of Defence in 1996. He became a public servant with the Commonwealth Department of Defence (1996–2000) before spending a year as a short-term missionary in Fiji and New Zealand. When he returned, he re-entered the public service in the Queensland Department of the Premier and Cabinet (2001–04) and then Child Safety (2005–09).

== Political career ==
In the 2009 Queensland state election, he was elected to the Legislative Assembly of Queensland for the seat of Glass House, representing the Liberal National Party.

=== Member of Parliament ===
As the Shadow Minister for the Environment in 2011, Powell's environmental policies were ranked 'negative' on all four areas assessed by a collection of five environmental interest groups, including Queensland Conservation and the Australian Marine Conservation Society. When sent the initial reports by these groups and asked for feedback, Powell declined to respond.

After retaining his seat with an increased majority at the 2012 Queensland state election, Powell was sworn in as Minister for the Environment and Heritage Protection in the Newman ministry on 3 April 2012.

In 2014 as the environment minister, he advised Australians to boycott the American ice-cream company Ben & Jerry's, saying they had damaged the reputation of the Great Barrier Reef and jeopardised jobs and tourism dollars.

Land clearing, although on a downward trend under the previous Bligh Ministry, increased substantially during Powell's tenure as Environment Minister. Data from the Queensland Government's Statewide Landcover and Trees Study (SLATS) shows a grand total of nearly 1.2 million hectares of land was cleared.

Powell retained his seat in the 2015 Queensland state election, with a 2.5% swing towards him in the 2017 Queensland state election, but lost his ministerial responsibilities as a result of the election of the Palaszczuk Labor Government.

Parliament of Queensland
Preceded by Carolyn Male	Member for Glass House; 2009–present	Incumbent
