= Daylight Saving for South East Queensland =

Daylight Saving for South East Queensland (DS4SEQ)
- Founded: 2008
- Headquarters: South East Queensland
- Ideology: Daylight Saving in Queensland
- Political position: Apolitical

Website
- http://www.ds4seq.org.au/

Daylight Saving for South East Queensland (DS4SEQ) was a political party in Queensland, Australia. It was a single-issue party, run by volunteers, that advocated the introduction of Daylight Saving into Queensland, or at the very least into South East Queensland under a dual-time zone arrangement - with the remainder of the state to maintain standard time. The party proposed a possible dual time zone, which included the following 15 local and regional government areas: Brisbane, Fraser Coast, Gold Coast, Goondiwindi, Gympie, Ipswich, Lockyer, Logan, Moreton Bay, Redland, Scenic Rim, Somerset, Southern Downs, Sunshine Coast, and Toowoomba. The party was officially registered with the Electoral Commission of Queensland (ECQ) in December 2008 and was not registered with the Australian Electoral Commission. In August 2012, DS4SEQ submitted a request to the ECQ to deregister the party, and this process was finalised in October 2012. DS4SEQ maintains a presence as a lobby group and may potentially re-register as a political party in the future. Jason Furze was leader of the party from December 2008 until June 2011.

== Actions ==
=== Elections ===
==== 2009 Queensland state election ====
The party contested the March 2009 Queensland State election with 32 candidates. DS4SEQ received one percent of the statewide primary vote, equating to around 2.5% across the 32 electorates contested. Their highest result was 4.6 percent in the electorate of Surfers Paradise on the Gold Coast.

On 8 March 2009, DS4SEQ launched their election campaign with a stunt on the Queensland and New South Wales state border. The party visually demonstrated how the absence of daylight saving impacts Gold Coast residents. The DS4SEQ team mowed grass on the New South Wales side of Boundary Street, where it was 8am. Less than a metre away on Queensland soil, the time was 7am, where a DS4SEQ member attempted to sleep, acknowledging the fact that council laws do not permit lawn mowing or other relatively noisy activities before 8am on Sunday.

==== 2012 Queensland state election ====
DS4SEQ did not contest the 2012 Queensland state election.

==== 2012 South Brisbane by-election ====
DS4SEQ contested the 2012 South Brisbane by-election, endorsing local resident and businesswoman, Penny Panorea. The party finished fourth out of eight candidates, gaining 3.7 percent of the primary vote. This result is three times greater than the 1.2% the party achieved in 2009, when they last contested the electorate.

=== Lobbying ===
==== Daylight Saving for South East Queensland Private Members Bill ====
In early 2010, DS4SEQ approached Independent Member Peter Wellington to introduce a private members Bill. As Wellington agreed with the principles of the DS4SEQ proposal, he introduced the Daylight Saving for South East Queensland Referendum Bill 2010 into Queensland Parliament on 14 April 2010.

The Premier of Queensland, Anna Bligh, responded by announcing a community consultation process, which resulted in over 74,000 respondents participating, 64 percent of whom voted in favour of a trial of daylight saving and 63% were also in favour of holding a referendum. As part of the consultation, DS4SEQ made a formal submission on behalf of its members and supporters.

During the consultation, DS4SEQ held its own 'referendum' on the Gold Coast, surveying more than 1000 people, and alerting them to the fact that the government was running a consultation on daylight saving.

On 7 June 2010, and after reviewing the favourable consultation results, Bligh announced that her Government would not support the Bill, because regional Queenslanders were overwhelmingly opposed to daylight saving. In spite of this announcement, DS4SEQ continued to call for Bligh and her government to reconsider their position.

Because the Bligh Government did not support the Bill, it was defeated in Queensland Parliament on 15 June 2011.

==== Formal Submission to NSW Cross Border Commissioner ====
In March 2012, DS4SEQ presented a formal submission to the newly appointed NSW Cross Border Commissioner, Cr Steve Toms, to inform him of the ongoing daylight saving debate within Queensland. This submission included two key recommendations for Cr Toms to consider: 1. evaluate the economic loss incurred by NSW businesses due to Queensland's non-adoption of Daylight Saving, and quantify the social detriment to NSW-Queensland border communities; 2. lobby the Queensland Premier to: a. hold a trial of Daylight Saving in Queensland, or at least in south-east Queensland; b. evaluate the economic benefits and quantify the community and lifestyle benefits of introducing Daylight Saving into Queensland, or in south-east Queensland; and c. after the trial period, hold a referendum of all Queensland registered voters.

==== Formal Submission to LNP Government ====
In early April 2012, DS4SEQ presented a formal submission to the newly elected Premier of Queensland, Campbell Newman, to put forward the case for addressing daylight saving in Queensland. This submission included four key recommendations for Premier Newman and his Government to consider: 1. hold a trial of daylight saving in Queensland, or at least in south-east Queensland; 2. implement an education program during the trial; 3. hold a referendum of all registered Queensland voters after the trial period; 4. evaluate the economic, community and lifestyle benefits of introducing daylight saving into Queensland, quantify the social detriment to communities along the NSW-Queensland border, and evaluate the economic loss currently incurred by businesses in other Australian states because of Queensland's non-adoption of daylight saving.

== See also ==
- Daylight Saving for South East Queensland Referendum Act 2010
- Daylight saving time around the world
- 1992 Queensland daylight saving referendum
- Time in Australia
- Daylight Saving Party
