= Mary-Anne O'Neill =

Australian politician

Member of the Queensland Legislative Assembly for Kallangur
- In office 21 March 2009 – 23 March 2012
- Preceded by: Ken Hayward
- Succeeded by: Trevor Ruthenberg

Personal details
- Born: 20 April 1955 (age 71) Tumut, New South Wales, Australia
- Party: Labor
- Occupation: Union organizer

Mary-Anne O'Neill (born 20 April 1955) is an Australian politician. She was a Labor Party member of the Legislative Assembly of Queensland from 2009 to 2012.

O'Neill was born and grew up in Tumut, New South Wales, and received higher education in Canberra. She was a union organiser before entering politics. In 2009, she was elected as the Labor member of the Legislative Assembly of Queensland for Kallangur, succeeding Ken Hayward, who retired.

Parliament of Queensland
Preceded by Ken Hayward	Member for Kallangur; 2009–2012	Succeeded by Trevor Ruthenberg
