= Trevor Ruthenberg =

Australian politician

Member of the Queensland Legislative Assembly for Kallangur
- In office 24 March 2012 – 31 January 2015
- Preceded by: Mary-Anne O'Neill
- Succeeded by: Shane King

Personal details
- Born: 24 January 1968 (age 58) Finschhafen, Papua New Guinea
- Party: Liberal National Party of Queensland
- Profession: Businessman

Military service
- Allegiance: Australia
- Branch/service: Royal Australian Air Force
- Rank: Corporal
- Unit: No. 38 Squadron

Trevor John Ruthenberg (born 24 January 1968) is a former Australian Liberal National politician who was the member of the Legislative Assembly of Queensland for Kallangur from 2012 to 2015.

After working in a fibreglass company, Ruthenberg joined the Royal Australian Air Force serving as a corporal for six years, in which period of time he completed a trade as an airframe fitter. Ruthenberg has lived in PNG, Indonesia, Chile, Canada, and the USA. He has directed marketing and sales projects into heavy industry application and developed innovative "go to market" strategies.

Prior to being elected, he was Executive Officer to the Lutheran Church of Australia, overseeing 85 schools, 45 aged care facilities and 60 early learning centres.

Ruthenberg was elected to the Legislative Assembly in the 2012 landslide, winning a usually safe Labor seat with a 17% swing. However, he was defeated after just one term in Parliament at the 2015 election by the Labor candidate Shane King.

In 2018, he was endorsed as the candidate for the 2018 Longman by-election, Longman being a Moreton Bay constituency in the federal House of Representatives. However, he was unsuccessful.

== Controversy ==
During the campaign for the 2018 Longman by-election, Ruthenberg touted his strengths such as being awarded an Australian Defence Medal, which is given to people who have completed four years of service. However, according to the Queensland parliament's website, Ruthenberg held an Australian Service Medal, a distinction higher than the Defence Medal, awarded for service in or in connection with a non-war operation such as peacekeeping.

Following revelation of the discrepancy by the Courier Mail on 17 July 2018 (during the Longman by-election campaign), Ruthenberg admitted the mistake and apologised, reportedly responding to the report by claiming he had "absolutely no clue" how the mistake had occurred but conceding he may have "screwed up". "If I screwed up then I screwed up and all I can do is apologise," he told the Courier Mail. "It was certainly not intentional and I respect the uniform way too much to claim I earned something I didn't."

Parliament of Queensland
Preceded by Mary-Anne O'Neill	Member for Kallangur; 2012–2015	Succeeded by Shane King
