= Electoral district of Kallangur =

Former state electoral district of Queensland, Australia

Kallangur Queensland—Legislative Assembly
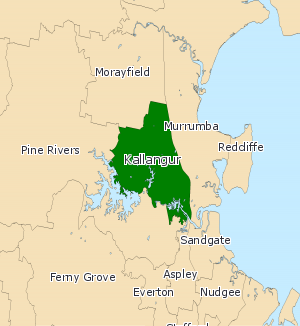
- Kallangur (2008–2017)
- State: Queensland
- Dates current: 1992–2017
- Namesake: Kallangur
- Electors: 32,836 (2015)
- Area: 99 km^{2} (38.2 sq mi)
- Coordinates: 27°14′S 152°57′E

Kallangur was an electoral district of the Legislative Assembly in the Australian state of Queensland from 1992 to 2017.

The district was based in the outer northern suburbs of Brisbane. It is named for the suburb of Kallangur and also includes the suburbs of Dakabin, Kurwongbah, Murrumba Downs, Petrie and part of Narangba. The electorate was first contested in 1992.

== Members for Kallangur ==
Member	Party	Term
Ken Hayward	Labor	1992–2009
Mary-Anne O'Neill	Labor	2009–2012
Trevor Ruthenberg	Liberal National	2012–2015
Shane King	Labor	2015–2017
