= Electoral results for the district of Surfers Paradise =

Election results for Surfers Paradise, Australia

This is a list of electoral results for the electoral district of Surfers Paradise in Queensland state elections, in Australia.

== Members for Surfers Paradise ==
| Member | Party | Term |
|---|---|---|
| (Sir) Bruce Small | Country | 1972–1974 |
| (Sir) Bruce Small | National | 1974–1977 |
| Bruce Bishop | Liberal | 1977–1980 |
| Rob Borbidge | National | 1980–2001 |
| Lex Bell | Independent | 2001–2004 |
| John-Paul Langbroek | Liberal | 2004–2008 |
| John-Paul Langbroek | Liberal National | 2008–present |

== Election results ==
=== Elections in the 2020s ===
2024 Queensland state election: Surfers Paradise
| Party | Candidate | Votes | % | ±% |
|---|---|---|---|---|
| Liberal National | John-Paul Langbroek | 18,602 | 61.50 | +3.8 |
| Labor | James Knight | 5,825 | 19.26 | −6.24 |
| One Nation | Mark Jaric | 2,338 | 7.73 | +1.53 |
| Greens | Steven Everson | 2,206 | 7.29 | −0.91 |
| Family First | Andrea Campbell | 650 | 2.15 | +2.15 |
| Animal Justice | Haydn Jolly | 627 | 2.07 | +2.07 |
| Total formal votes | | 30,248 | 96.05 | |
| Informal votes | | 1,244 | 3.95 | |
| Turnout | | 31,492 | 82.73 | |
Two-party-preferred result
| Liberal National | John-Paul Langbroek | 22,119 | 73.13 | +6.93 |
| Labor | James Knight | 8,129 | 26.87 | −6.93 |
| Liberal National hold | | Swing | +6.93 | |

2020 Queensland state election: Surfers Paradise
| Party | Candidate | Votes | % | ±% |
|---|---|---|---|---|
| Liberal National | John-Paul Langbroek | 16,470 | 57.73 | −5.50 |
| Labor | Brianna Bailey | 7,265 | 25.47 | +3.06 |
| Greens | Nelson Quinn | 2,324 | 8.15 | −0.96 |
| One Nation | Leeanne Schultz | 1,785 | 6.26 | +6.26 |
| United Australia | Roger McKay | 684 | 2.40 | +2.40 |
| Total formal votes | | 28,528 | 96.51 | +2.06 |
| Informal votes | | 1,031 | 3.49 | −2.06 |
| Turnout | | 29,559 | 84.30 | +3.34 |
Two-party-preferred result
| Liberal National | John-Paul Langbroek | 18,890 | 66.22 | −3.57 |
| Labor | Brianna Bailey | 9,638 | 33.78 | +3.57 |
| Liberal National hold | | Swing | −3.57 | |

=== Elections in the 2010s ===
2017 Queensland state election: Surfers Paradise
| Party | Candidate | Votes | % | ±% |
|---|---|---|---|---|
| Liberal National | John-Paul Langbroek | 16,127 | 63.2 | +1.2 |
| Labor | Tony Walker | 5,715 | 22.4 | +1.3 |
| Greens | Scott Turner | 2,323 | 9.1 | +1.5 |
| Independent | Chris Manley | 785 | 3.1 | +3.1 |
| Independent | Tylere Baker-Pearce | 556 | 2.2 | +2.2 |
| Total formal votes | | 25,506 | 94.5 | −3.3 |
| Informal votes | | 1,497 | 5.5 | +3.3 |
| Turnout | | 27,003 | 81.0 | −0.5 |
Two-party-preferred result
| Liberal National | John-Paul Langbroek | 17,799 | 69.8 | −0.6 |
| Labor | Tony Walker | 7,707 | 30.2 | +0.6 |
| Liberal National hold | | Swing | −0.6 | |

2015 Queensland state election: Surfers Paradise
| Party | Candidate | Votes | % | ±% |
|---|---|---|---|---|
| Liberal National | John-Paul Langbroek | 17,569 | 61.06 | −11.57 |
| Labor | Josh Blundell-Thornton | 6,544 | 22.74 | +6.20 |
| Greens | Helen Hunt | 2,221 | 7.72 | +0.60 |
| Palmer United | Stephen Gardner | 1,749 | 6.08 | +6.08 |
| Family First | Jonathon Scoones | 692 | 2.40 | −1.31 |
| Total formal votes | | 28,775 | 97.94 | +0.18 |
| Informal votes | | 605 | 2.06 | −0.18 |
| Turnout | | 29,380 | 84.12 | −2.57 |
Two-party-preferred result
| Liberal National | John-Paul Langbroek | 18,405 | 69.21 | −10.29 |
| Labor | Josh Blundell-Thornton | 8,188 | 30.79 | +10.29 |
| Liberal National hold | | Swing | −10.29 | |

2012 Queensland state election: Surfers Paradise
| Party | Candidate | Votes | % | ±% |
|---|---|---|---|---|
| Liberal National | John-Paul Langbroek | 18,993 | 72.63 | +13.61 |
| Labor | Matthew Donovan | 4,325 | 16.54 | −10.93 |
| Greens | Helen Wainwright | 1,861 | 7.12 | +0.58 |
| Family First | Andrea Raymond | 971 | 3.71 | +3.71 |
| Total formal votes | | 26,150 | 97.76 | −0.11 |
| Informal votes | | 600 | 2.24 | +0.11 |
| Turnout | | 26,750 | 86.70 | +0.90 |
Two-party-preferred result
| Liberal National | John-Paul Langbroek | 19,688 | 79.50 | +12.98 |
| Labor | Matthew Donovan | 5,078 | 20.50 | −12.98 |
| Liberal National hold | | Swing | +12.98 | |

=== Elections in the 2000s ===
2009 Queensland state election: Surfers Paradise
| Party | Candidate | Votes | % | ±% |
|---|---|---|---|---|
| Liberal National | John-Paul Langbroek | 15,075 | 59.0 | +1.6 |
| Labor | Caleb Rook | 7,017 | 27.5 | −6.2 |
| Greens | Bridget Maizey | 1,671 | 6.5 | −2.3 |
| DS4SEQ | Wendy Coe | 1,166 | 4.6 | +4.6 |
| Independent | Don Magin | 613 | 2.4 | +2.4 |
| Total formal votes | | 25,542 | 97.7 | |
| Informal votes | | 556 | 2.3 | |
| Turnout | | 26,098 | 85.8 | |
Two-party-preferred result
| Liberal National | John-Paul Langbroek | 15,808 | 66.5 | +4.4 |
| Labor | Caleb Rook | 7,958 | 33.5 | −4.4 |
| Liberal National hold | | Swing | +4.4 | |

2006 Queensland state election: Surfers Paradise
| Party | Candidate | Votes | % | ±% |
|---|---|---|---|---|
| Liberal | John-Paul Langbroek | 14,483 | 57.3 | +12.6 |
| Labor | Guy Jones | 8,563 | 33.9 | +8.4 |
| Greens | Dean Hepburn | 2,220 | 8.8 | +1.9 |
| Total formal votes | | 25,266 | 97.8 | +0.1 |
| Informal votes | | 560 | 2.2 | −0.1 |
| Turnout | | 25,826 | 85.5 | −1.1 |
Two-party-preferred result
| Liberal | John-Paul Langbroek | 14,926 | 62.0 | −1.9 |
| Labor | Guy Jones | 9,157 | 38.0 | +1.9 |
| Liberal hold | | Swing | −1.9 | |

2004 Queensland state election: Surfers Paradise
| Party | Candidate | Votes | % | ±% |
|---|---|---|---|---|
| Liberal | John-Paul Langbroek | 11,348 | 44.7 | +44.7 |
| Labor | David Parrish | 6,462 | 25.5 | −12.8 |
| Independent | Lex Bell | 5,810 | 22.9 | +22.9 |
| Greens | Graham Lapthorne | 1,760 | 6.9 | −5.1 |
| Total formal votes | | 25,380 | 97.7 | +0.8 |
| Informal votes | | 602 | 2.3 | −0.8 |
| Turnout | | 25,982 | 86.6 | −1.6 |
Two-party-preferred result
| Liberal | John-Paul Langbroek | 13,014 | 63.9 | +63.9 |
| Labor | David Parrish | 7,350 | 36.1 | −8.6 |
| Liberal gain from Independent | | Swing | N/A | |

2001 Surfers Paradise state by-election
| Party | Candidate | Votes | % | ±% |
|---|---|---|---|---|
| Independent | Lex Bell | 7,966 | 35.91 | +35.91 |
| Liberal | John-Paul Langbroek | 4,708 | 21.22 | +21.22 |
| Labor | Richard Alcorn | 4,441 | 20.02 | −18.25 |
| National | Susie Douglas | 1,784 | 8.04 | −41.70 |
| One Nation | Lesley Millar | 1,055 | 4.76 | +4.76 |
| Greens | Dean Hepburn | 926 | 4.26 | −7.72 |
| Independent | Perry Cross | 751 | 3.39 | +3.39 |
| Independent | Tony Horkings | 218 | 0.98 | +0.98 |
| Independent | Linda McGill | 179 | 0.76 | +0.76 |
| Independent | Fred Fraser | 77 | 0.35 | +0.35 |
| Independent | Arthur Coghlan | 52 | 0.24 | +0.24 |
| Independent | Rob McJannett | 15 | 0.07 | +0.07 |
| Total formal votes | | 22,183 | 98.11 | +1.25 |
| Informal votes | | 428 | 1.89 | −1.25 |
| Turnout | | 22,611 | 77.70 | −10.49 |
Two-candidate-preferred result
| Independent | Lex Bell | 8,811 | 58.12 | +58.12 |
| Liberal | John-Paul Langbroek | 6,350 | 41.88 | +41.88 |
| Independent gain from National | | Swing | N/A | |

2001 Queensland state election: Surfers Paradise
| Party | Candidate | Votes | % | ±% |
|---|---|---|---|---|
| National | Rob Borbidge | 12,033 | 49.7 | −2.6 |
| Labor | Richard Alcorn | 9,259 | 38.3 | +13.9 |
| Greens | Dean Hepburn | 2,899 | 12.0 | +8.3 |
| Total formal votes | | 24,191 | 96.9 | |
| Informal votes | | 784 | 3.1 | |
| Turnout | | 24,975 | 88.2 | |
Two-party-preferred result
| National | Rob Borbidge | 12,546 | 55.3 | −13.6 |
| Labor | Richard Alcorn | 10,147 | 44.7 | +13.6 |
| National hold | | Swing | −13.6 | |

=== Elections in the 1990s ===
1998 Queensland state election: Surfers Paradise
| Party | Candidate | Votes | % | ±% |
|---|---|---|---|---|
| National | Rob Borbidge | 10,880 | 56.4 | −10.9 |
| Labor | Steve Axe | 4,167 | 21.6 | −3.5 |
| One Nation | Phil Connolly | 3,354 | 17.4 | +17.4 |
| Greens | Ray Schearer | 894 | 4.6 | +4.6 |
| Total formal votes | | 19,295 | 98.3 | −0.1 |
| Informal votes | | 325 | 1.7 | +0.1 |
| Turnout | | 19,620 | 88.4 | +2.0 |
Two-party-preferred result
| National | Rob Borbidge | 12,907 | 72.3 | +0.5 |
| Labor | Steve Axe | 4,955 | 27.7 | −0.5 |
| National hold | | Swing | +0.5 | |

1995 Queensland state election: Surfers Paradise
| Party | Candidate | Votes | % | ±% |
|---|---|---|---|---|
| National | Rob Borbidge | 12,051 | 67.3 | +22.2 |
| Labor | Peter Burke | 4,502 | 25.1 | +25.1 |
| Democrats | Brad Farmer | 982 | 5.5 | +5.5 |
| Independent | Christian Jocumsen | 369 | 2.1 | +2.1 |
| Total formal votes | | 17,904 | 98.5 | +1.5 |
| Informal votes | | 274 | 1.5 | −1.5 |
| Turnout | | 18,178 | 86.4 | |
Two-party-preferred result
| National | Rob Borbidge | 12,581 | 71.8 | +18.8 |
| Labor | Peter Burke | 4,951 | 28.2 | +28.2 |
| National hold | | Swing | +18.8 | |

1992 Queensland state election: Surfers Paradise
| Party | Candidate | Votes | % | ±% |
|---|---|---|---|---|
| National | Rob Borbidge | 7,983 | 45.2 | +11.0 |
| Liberal | Trevor Coomber | 4,976 | 28.1 | −5.1 |
| Independent | Murray Andrew | 3,227 | 18.3 | +18.3 |
| Confederate Action | Jeanie O'Kane | 1,492 | 8.4 | +8.4 |
| Total formal votes | | 17,678 | 97.0 | |
| Informal votes | | 547 | 3.0 | |
| Turnout | | 18,225 | 86.1 | |
Two-candidate-preferred result
| National | Rob Borbidge | 8,668 | 52.9 | −11.9 |
| Liberal | Trevor Coomber | 7,708 | 47.1 | +47.1 |
| National hold | | Swing | −11.9 | |

=== Elections in the 1980s ===
1989 Queensland state election: Surfers Paradise
| Party | Candidate | Votes | % | ±% |
|---|---|---|---|---|
| National | Rob Borbidge | 4,962 | 33.2 | −21.0 |
| Labor | Bruce Farrell | 4,771 | 31.9 | +11.2 |
| Liberal | John Bradford | 4,707 | 31.5 | +9.7 |
| Independent | Selwyn Tully | 512 | 3.4 | +3.4 |
| Total formal votes | | 14,952 | 96.8 | −0.5 |
| Informal votes | | 487 | 3.2 | +0.5 |
| Turnout | | 15,439 | 83.7 | −1.6 |
Two-party-preferred result
| National | Rob Borbidge | 9,292 | 62.2 | −9.1 |
| Labor | Bruce Farrell | 5,660 | 37.8 | +9.1 |
| National hold | | Swing | −9.1 | |

1986 Queensland state election: Surfers Paradise
| Party | Candidate | Votes | % | ±% |
|---|---|---|---|---|
| National | Rob Borbidge | 8,221 | 54.2 | −2.7 |
| Liberal | Laurence Wade | 3,306 | 21.8 | +8.3 |
| Labor | Bruce Farrell | 3,130 | 20.7 | −8.8 |
| Democrats | Ken Petersen | 370 | 2.4 | +2.4 |
| Vigilance | Warren Fenton | 134 | 0.9 | +0.9 |
| Total formal votes | | 15,161 | 97.3 | |
| Turnout | | 421 | 2.7 | |
| Turnout | | 15,582 | 85.3 | |
Two-party-preferred result
| National | Rob Borbidge | 10,810 | 71.3 | +0.8 |
| Labor | Bruce Farrell | 4,351 | 28.7 | −0.8 |
| National hold | | Swing | +0.8 | |

1983 Queensland state election: Surfers Paradise
| Party | Candidate | Votes | % | ±% |
|---|---|---|---|---|
| National | Rob Borbidge | 11,994 | 56.9 | +15.0 |
| Labor | Khalil Salem | 6,219 | 29.5 | +8.6 |
| Liberal | Theodore Greenland | 2,847 | 13.5 | −19.3 |
| Total formal votes | | 21,060 | 98.3 | 0.0 |
| Informal votes | | 356 | 1.7 | 0.0 |
| Turnout | | 21,416 | 87.8 | +3.1 |
Two-party-preferred result
| National | Rob Borbidge | 14,205 | 67.4 | −1.3 |
| Labor | Khalil Salem | 6,855 | 32.6 | +1.3 |
| National hold | | Swing | −1.3 | |

1980 Queensland state election: Surfers Paradise
| Party | Candidate | Votes | % | ±% |
|---|---|---|---|---|
| National | Rob Borbidge | 7,459 | 41.9 | +3.2 |
| Liberal | Bruce Bishop | 5,842 | 32.8 | +6.9 |
| Labor | Khalil Salem | 3,725 | 20.9 | −1.1 |
| Independent | Eileen Peters | 768 | 4.3 | +4.3 |
| Total formal votes | | 17,794 | 98.3 | +0.6 |
| Informal votes | | 304 | 1.7 | −0.6 |
| Turnout | | 18,098 | 84.7 | −2.9 |
Two-candidate-preferred result
| National | Rob Borbidge | 10,305 | 57.9 | +13.6 |
| Liberal | Bruce Bishop | 7,489 | 42.1 | −13.6 |
| National gain from Liberal | | Swing | +13.6 | |

=== Elections in the 1970s ===
1977 Queensland state election: Surfers Paradise
| Party | Candidate | Votes | % | ±% |
|---|---|---|---|---|
| National | Bruce Small | 5,216 | 38.7 | −20.0 |
| Liberal | Bruce Bishop | 3,482 | 25.9 | +25.9 |
| Labor | Philip Button | 2,960 | 22.0 | −2.1 |
| Democrats | Ronald Holland | 1,643 | 12.2 | +12.2 |
| Progress | Donald Wright | 164 | 1.2 | +1.2 |
| Total formal votes | | 13,465 | 97.7 | |
| Informal votes | | 318 | 2.3 | |
| Turnout | | 13,783 | 87.6 | |
Two-party-preferred result
| Liberal | Bruce Bishop | 8,636 | 64.1 | −8.1 |
| Labor | Philip Button | 4,829 | 35.9 | +8.1 |
Two-candidate-preferred result
| Liberal | Bruce Bishop | 7,506 | 55.7 | +55.7 |
| National | Bruce Small | 5,959 | 44.3 | −28.7 |
| Liberal gain from National | | Swing | N/A | |

1974 Queensland state election: Surfers Paradise
| Party | Candidate | Votes | % | ±% |
|---|---|---|---|---|
| National | Bruce Small | 10,277 | 58.7 | +29.3 |
| Labor | Maurice Marsden | 4,215 | 24.1 | −6.0 |
| Independent | John Duncan | 2,631 | 15.0 | +15.0 |
| Queensland Labor | John Perrett | 376 | 2.2 | −1.6 |
| Total formal votes | | 17,499 | 97.9 | +0.7 |
| Informal votes | | 373 | 2.1 | −0.7 |
| Turnout | | 17,872 | 85.4 | −2.4 |
Two-party-preferred result
| National | Bruce Small | 12,694 | 72.5 | +12.9 |
| Labor | Maurice Marsden | 4,805 | 27.5 | −12.9 |
| National hold | | Swing | +12.9 | |

1972 Queensland state election: Surfers Paradise
| Party | Candidate | Votes | % | ±% |
|---|---|---|---|---|
| Labor | Keith Hunt | 4,223 | 30.1 | |
| Liberal | John McIlwain | 4,202 | 29.9 | |
| Country | Bruce Small | 4,122 | 29.4 | |
| Independent | Eileen Peters | 655 | 4.7 | |
| Queensland Labor | Frederick Bassani | 536 | 3.8 | |
| Independent | William Daniel | 303 | 2.2 | |
| Total formal votes | | 14,041 | 97.2 | |
| Informal votes | | 398 | 2.8 | |
| Turnout | | 14,439 | 87.8 | |
Two-party-preferred result
| Country | Bruce Small | 8,368 | 59.6 | −11.4 |
| Labor | Keith Hunt | 5,673 | 40.4 | +11.4 |
| Country hold | | Swing | −11.4 | |
