= Electoral results for the district of Burleigh =

Queensland, Australia, district election results

This is a list of electoral results for the electoral district of Burleigh in Queensland state elections.

== Members for Burleigh ==
Member	Party	Term
Judy Gamin	National	1992–2001
Christine Smith	Labor	2001–2012
Michael Hart	Liberal National	2012–2024
Hermann Vorster	Liberal National	2024-present

== Election results ==
=== Elections in the 2020s ===
2024 Queensland state election: Burleigh
Party	Candidate	Votes	%	±%
Liberal National	Hermann Vorster	15,002	49.81	+10.10
Labor	Claire Carlin	7,370	24.47	−11.40
Greens	Hunter Grove-McGrath	2,511	8.34	−0.97
Libertarian	Cathy Osborne	1,616	5.36	+5.36
One Nation	Eliot Tasses	1,315	4.36	−2.79
Legalise Cannabis	Jason Gann	996	3.31	−0.36
Animal Justice	Amelia Dunn	878	2.91	−0.30
Family First	Neena Tester	433	1.44	+1.44
Total formal votes		30,121	93.99	−1.81
Informal votes		1,926	6.01	+1.81
Turnout		32,047	84.31	−1.19
Two-party-preferred result
Liberal National	Hermann Vorster	18,902	62.75	+11.54
Labor	Claire Carlin	11,219	37.25	−11.54
Liberal National hold		Swing	+11.54	

2020 Queensland state election: Burleigh
Party	Candidate	Votes	%	±%
Liberal National	Michael Hart	11,743	39.71	−10.02
Labor	Wayne (Rabbit) Bartholomew	10,609	35.87	+1.67
Greens	Rachel Mebberson	2,753	9.31	−6.76
One Nation	Georgie Batty	2,114	7.15	+7.15
Legalise Cannabis	Ingrid Weber	1,085	3.67	+3.67
Animal Justice	Scott Wallace	948	3.21	+3.21
United Australia	Carlo Filingeri	321	1.09	+1.09
Total formal votes		29,573	95.80	+1.36
Informal votes		1,297	4.20	−1.36
Turnout		30,870	85.50	+1.59
Two-party-preferred result
Liberal National	Michael Hart	15,143	51.21	−3.65
Labor	Wayne (Rabbit) Bartholomew	14,430	48.79	+3.65
Liberal National hold		Swing	−3.65	

=== Elections in the 2010s ===
2017 Queensland state election: Burleigh
Party	Candidate	Votes	%	±%
Liberal National	Michael Hart	13,717	49.7	+3.9
Labor	Gail Hislop	9,435	34.2	+3.2
Greens	Peter Burgoyne	4,434	16.1	+5.2
Total formal votes		27,586	94.4	−2.9
Informal votes		1,625	5.6	+2.9
Turnout		29,211	83.9	−1.8
Two-party-preferred result
Liberal National	Michael Hart	15,132	54.9	−0.6
Labor	Gail Hislop	12,454	45.2	+0.6
Liberal National hold		Swing	−0.6	

2015 Queensland state election: Burleigh
Party	Candidate	Votes	%	±%
Liberal National	Michael Hart	13,784	46.67	−4.51
Labor	Gail Hislop	9,175	31.07	+0.22
Greens	Jane Power	3,108	10.52	+2.08
Palmer United	James Mac Anally	2,299	7.78	+7.78
Family First	Susan Baynes	1,167	3.95	+1.54
Total formal votes		29,533	97.42	−0.61
Informal votes		783	2.58	+0.61
Turnout		30,316	87.00	−1.40
Two-party-preferred result
Liberal National	Michael Hart	14,984	56.16	−4.89
Labor	Gail Hislop	11,696	43.84	+4.89
Liberal National hold		Swing	−4.89	

2012 Queensland state election: Burleigh
Party	Candidate	Votes	%	±%
Liberal National	Michael Hart	14,222	51.18	+12.30
Labor	Christine Smith	8,572	30.85	−15.96
Greens	Jane Power	2,345	8.44	+0.79
Katter's Australian	Dean Fisher	1,976	7.11	+7.11
Family First	Jeremy Fredericks	671	2.41	+0.50
Total formal votes		27,786	98.03	+0.21
Informal votes		559	1.97	−0.21
Turnout		28,345	88.41	−0.44
Two-party-preferred result
Liberal National	Michael Hart	15,324	61.05	+15.95
Labor	Christine Smith	9,778	38.95	−15.95
Liberal National gain from Labor		Swing	+15.95	

=== Elections in the 2000s ===
2009 Queensland state election: Burleigh
Party	Candidate	Votes	%	±%
Labor	Christine Smith	12,637	46.8	−6.1
Liberal National	Michael Hart	10,498	38.9	+1.6
Greens	Anja Light	2,065	7.6	−2.2
DS4SEQ	Bryden Elssmann	807	3.0	+2.5
Family First	Jeremy Fredericks	516	1.9	+1.9
Independent	Ray Sperring	476	1.8	+1.8
Total formal votes		26,999	97.6	
Informal votes		603	2.4	
Turnout		27,602	88.9	
Two-party-preferred result
Labor	Christine Smith	13,733	54.9	−3.9
Liberal National	Michael Hart	11,281	45.1	+3.9
Labor hold		Swing	−3.9	

2006 Queensland state election: Burleigh
Party	Candidate	Votes	%	±%
Labor	Christine Smith	14,651	52.5	+5.2
Liberal	Michael Hart	10,537	37.7	+37.7
Greens	Mike Beale	2,743	9.8	+1.2
Total formal votes		27,931	97.7	−0.2
Informal votes		642	2.3	+0.2
Turnout		28,573	87.7	−1.7
Two-party-preferred result
Labor	Christine Smith	15,501	58.3	+3.3
Liberal	Michael Hart	11,072	41.7	−3.3
Labor hold		Swing	+3.3	

2004 Queensland state election: Burleigh
Party	Candidate	Votes	%	±%
Labor	Christine Smith	13,130	47.3	+3.0
National	Max Duncan	10,667	38.4	−0.4
Greens	Inge Light	2,386	8.6	+8.6
One Nation	Paul Lewis	1,593	5.7	−11.3
Total formal votes		27,776	97.9	+0.1
Informal votes		589	2.1	−0.1
Turnout		28,365	89.4	−1.2
Two-party-preferred result
Labor	Christine Smith	14,190	55.0	+3.2
National	Max Duncan	11,590	45.0	−3.2
Labor hold		Swing	+3.2	

2001 Queensland state election: Burleigh
Party	Candidate	Votes	%	±%
Labor	Christine Smith	11,445	44.3	+12.0
National	Judy Gamin	10,020	38.8	+2.6
One Nation	Colleen Pepperell	4,385	17.0	−4.7
Total formal votes		25,850	97.8	
Informal votes		588	2.2	
Turnout		26,438	90.6	
Two-party-preferred result
Labor	Christine Smith	12,062	51.8	+10.3
National	Judy Gamin	11,233	48.2	−10.3
Labor gain from National		Swing	+10.3	

=== Elections in the 1990s ===
1998 Queensland state election: Burleigh
Party	Candidate	Votes	%	±%
National	Judy Gamin	8,431	41.3	−12.5
Labor	Michael Lennon	6,581	32.2	−7.7
One Nation	Terry Sharples	4,403	21.6	+21.6
Greens	David Byerlee	995	4.9	+4.9
Total formal votes		20,410	98.4	+0.1
Informal votes		329	1.6	−0.1
Turnout		20,739	91.1	+1.2
Two-party-preferred result
National	Judy Gamin	11,088	58.5	+1.1
Labor	Michael Lennon	7,882	41.5	−1.1
National hold		Swing	+1.1	

1995 Queensland state election: Burleigh
Party	Candidate	Votes	%	±%
National	Judy Gamin	10,132	53.8	+22.0
Labor	Mark Whillans	7,508	39.9	−4.7
Democrats	Melinda Norman-Hicks	1,179	6.3	+6.3
Total formal votes		18,819	98.3	+0.4
Informal votes		317	1.7	−0.4
Turnout		19,136	89.9	
Two-party-preferred result
National	Judy Gamin	10,581	57.3	+6.2
Labor	Mark Whillans	7,882	42.7	−6.2
National hold		Swing	+6.2	

1992 Queensland state election: Burleigh
Party	Candidate	Votes	%	±%
Labor	Pat Stern	8,151	44.6	+1.7
National	Judy Gamin	5,811	31.8	+6.0
Liberal	Lyle Schuntner	3,448	18.9	−8.2
Independent	Antony Bradshaw	871	4.8	+4.8
Total formal votes		18,281	97.9	
Informal votes		393	2.1	
Turnout		18,674	89.2	
Two-party-preferred result
National	Judy Gamin	9,006	51.1	+51.1
Labor	Pat Stern	8,624	48.9	+2.5
National gain from Liberal		Swing	N/A	
