= Electoral results for the district of South Coast (Queensland) =

Queensland, Australia, district election results

This is a list of electoral results for the electoral district of South Coast in Queensland state elections.

== Members for South Coast ==
Member	Party	Term
Eric Gaven	Country	1960–1966
Russ Hinze	Country / National	1966–1988
Judy Gamin	National	1988–1989
Bob Quinn	Liberal	1989–1992

== Election results ==
=== Elections in the 1980s ===
1989 Queensland state election: South Coast
Party	Candidate	Votes	%	±%
Labor	Constance Stern	9,394	39.1	+8.8
Liberal	Bob Quinn	6,820	28.4	+8.4
National	Judy Gamin	6,799	28.3	−21.4
Independent	David Champion	1,017	4.2	+4.2
Total formal votes		24,030	97.1	−0.9
Informal votes		728	2.9	+0.9
Turnout		24,758	89.1	+1.3
Two-party-preferred result
Liberal	Bob Quinn	13,877	57.7	+57.7
Labor	Constance Stern	10,153	42.3	+6.0
Liberal gain from National		Swing	N/A	

1988 South Coast state by-election
Party	Candidate	Votes	%	±%
National	Judy Gamin	5,716	30.43	−19.26
Liberal	Bob Quinn	5,426	28.89	+8.86
Labor	Dallas Watson	4,293	22.85	−7.42
Independent	Philip Black	1,488	7.92	+7.92
Citizens Electoral Council	Lindsay Hartwig	589	3.14	+3.14
Democrats	Anthony William Kennedy	571	2.51	+2.51
Australian Independent	Bruce Whiteside	420	2.30	+2.30
ASSP	Ennis Groom	225	1.20	+1.20
Independent	James Drabsch	83	0.44	+0.44
Independent	John Kachel	61	0.32	+0.32
Total formal votes		18,784	95.27	−2.75
Informal votes		932	4.73	+2.75
Turnout		19,716	77.60	−10.22
Two-candidate-preferred result
National	Judy Gamin	9,464	50.38	
Liberal	Bob Quinn	9,320	49.62	
National hold		Swing		

1986 Queensland state election: South Coast
Party	Candidate	Votes	%	±%
National	Russ Hinze	8,459	49.7	+1.1
Labor	Rupert Granrott	5,153	30.3	−8.2
Liberal	John Richardson	3,410	20.0	+7.0
Total formal votes		17,022	98.0	
Informal votes		344	2.0	
Turnout		17,366	87.8	
Two-party-preferred result
National	Russ Hinze	10,848	63.7	+3.0
Labor	Rupert Granrott	6,174	36.3	−3.0
National hold		Swing	+3.0	

1983 Queensland state election: South Coast
Party	Candidate	Votes	%	±%
National	Russ Hinze	11,325	48.6	+4.5
Labor	Noel Elliott	8,971	38.5	+16.7
Liberal	Ian Foyster	3,021	13.0	−10.7
Total formal votes		23,317	98.7	+0.4
Informal votes		314	1.3	−0.4
Turnout		23,631	87.1	+2.4
Two-party-preferred result
National	Russ Hinze	13,405	57.5	−7.1
Labor	Noel Elliott	9,912	42.5	+7.1
National hold		Swing	−7.1	

1980 Queensland state election: South Coast
Party	Candidate	Votes	%	±%
National	Russ Hinze	8,049	44.1	−11.3
Labor	Philip Button	3,969	21.8	−15.1
Liberal	Ross Woods	2,404	13.2	+13.2
Liberal	Elizabeth Diamond	1,929	10.6	+10.6
Independent	Robert Neumann	1,394	7.6	+7.6
Coalitionist	Michael Carey	303	1.7	+1.7
Independent	Julia Freebury	119	0.7	+0.7
Independent	James Drabsch	77	0.4	−7.3
Total formal votes		18,244	98.3	+0.2
Informal votes		323	1.7	−0.2
Turnout		18,567	84.7	−3.8
Two-party-preferred result
National	Russ Hinze	11,788	64.6	+5.3
Labor	Philip Button	6,456	35.4	−5.3
National hold		Swing	+5.3	

=== Elections in the 1970s ===
1977 Queensland state election: South Coast
Party	Candidate	Votes	%	±%
National	Russ Hinze	8,067	55.4	−10.5
Labor	Ennis Groom	5,367	36.9	+2.8
Independent	James Drabsch	1,123	7.7	+7.7
Total formal votes		14,557	98.0	
Informal votes		289	2.0	
Turnout		14,846	88.5	
Two-party-preferred result
National	Russ Hinze	8,629	59.3	−6.6
Labor	Ennis Groom	5,928	40.7	+6.6
National hold		Swing	−6.6	

1974 Queensland state election: South Coast
Party	Candidate	Votes	%	±%
National	Russ Hinze	11,544	67.7	+28.5
Labor	Marion Reid	5,513	32.3	−1.8
Total formal votes		17,057	97.4	−0.4
Informal votes		456	2.6	+0.4
Turnout		17,513	83.9	−4.4
National hold		Swing	+6.0	

1972 Queensland state election: South Coast
Party	Candidate	Votes	%	±%
Country	Russ Hinze	5,072	39.2	−1.0
Labor	Ronald Todd	4,410	34.1	+12.2
Liberal	Bruce Bishop	2,256	17.4	−15.0
Independent	Douglas Roughton	694	5.4	+5.4
Queensland Labor	Victor Kearney	493	3.8	+0.1
Total formal votes		12,925	97.8	
Informal votes		291	2.2	
Turnout		13,216	88.3	
Two-party-preferred result
Country	Russ Hinze	7,975	61.7	−9.0
Labor	Ronald Todd	4,950	38.3	+9.0
Country hold		Swing	−9.0	

=== Elections in the 1960s ===
1969 Queensland state election: South Coast
Party	Candidate	Votes	%	±%
Country	Russ Hinze	6,071	40.2	+9.7
Liberal	Bruce Bishop	4,883	32.4	−5.5
Labor	Frank Culell	3,309	21.9	+1.0
Queensland Labor	Laurence Kehoe	553	3.7	+0.2
Independent	Dino Bertoldo	164	1.1	+1.1
Independent	John Lee	104	0.7	+0.7
Total formal votes		15,084	96.3	−1.8
Informal votes		577	3.7	+1.8
Turnout		15,661	85.4	−3.9
Two-candidate-preferred result
Country	Russ Hinze	9,407	62.4	+9.9
Liberal	Bruce Bishop	5,677	37.6	−9.9
Country hold		Swing	+9.9	

1966 Queensland state election: South Coast
Party	Candidate	Votes	%	±%
Liberal	Herbert Winders	4,464	37.9	+37.9
Country	Russ Hinze	3,588	30.5	−47.0
Labor	Kevin Cummings	2,462	20.9	+1.6
Independent	Bernard Elsey	844	7.2	+7.2
Queensland Labor	John McWatters	415	3.5	+0.2
Total formal votes		11,773	98.1	−0.6
Informal votes		225	1.9	+0.6
Turnout		11,998	89.3	+0.2
Two-candidate-preferred result
Country	Russ Hinze	6,175	52.5	−27.6
Liberal	Herbert Winders	5,598	47.5	+47.5
Country hold		Swing	−27.6	

1963 Queensland state election: South Coast
Party	Candidate	Votes	%	±%
Country	Eric Gaven	7,306	77.5	+1.6
Labor	Irene Weir	1,817	19.3	−2.2
Queensland Labor	Douglas Schwede	308	3.3	+3.3
Total formal votes		9,431	98.7	+0.5
Informal votes		119	1.3	−0.5
Turnout		9,550	89.1	+1.7
Two-party-preferred result
Country	Eric Gaven	7,557	80.1	
Labor	Irene Weir	1,874	19.9	
Country hold		Swing	N/A	

1960 Queensland state election: South Coast
Party	Candidate	Votes	%	±%
Country	Eric Gaven	6,611	75.9	
Labor	William Darveniza	1,872	21.5	
Independent	John Fitzgerald	223	2.6	
Total formal votes		8,706	98.2	
Informal votes		163	1.8	
Turnout		8,869	87.4	
Country win		(new seat)		
