= Electoral results for the district of Caloundra =

Queensland, Australia, district election results

This is a list of electoral results for the electoral district of Caloundra in Queensland state elections.

== Members for Caloundra ==
Member	Party	Term
Joan Sheldon	Liberal	1992–2004
Mark McArdle	Liberal	2004–2008
Mark McArdle	Liberal National	2008–2020
Jason Hunt	Labor	2020–2024
Kendall Morton	Liberal National	2024-present

== Election results ==
=== Elections in the 2020s ===
2024 Queensland state election: Caloundra
Party	Candidate	Votes	%	±%
Liberal National	Kendall Morton	16,771	43.10	+5.40
Labor	Jason Hunt	13,986	35.95	−5.36
Greens	Peta Higgs	3,237	8.32	−1.79
One Nation	Ben Storch	2,388	6.14	−0.05
Legalise Cannabis	Allison McMaster	1,406	3.61	+3.61
Animal Justice	Pamela Mariko	633	1.63	+1.63
Independent	Mike Jessop	486	1.25	+0.49
Total formal votes		38,907	95.10	−0.49
Informal votes		2,004	4.90	+0.49
Turnout		40,911	89.43	+1.27
Two-party-preferred result
Liberal National	Kendall Morton	20,159	51.81	+4.32
Labor	Jason Hunt	18,748	48.19	−4.32
Liberal National gain from Labor		Swing	+4.32	

2020 Queensland state election: Caloundra
Party	Candidate	Votes	%	±%
Labor	Jason Hunt	13,406	41.31	+12.62
Liberal National	Stuart Coward	12,234	37.70	−0.35
Greens	Raelene Ellis	3,281	10.11	−0.54
One Nation	Luke Poland	2,007	6.19	−16.42
Informed Medical Options	Belinda Hart	783	2.41	+2.41
United Australia	Trevor Gray	255	0.79	+0.79
Independent	Mike Jessop	245	0.76	+0.76
Independent	Mathew Hill	238	0.73	+0.73
Total formal votes		32,449	95.59	−0.34
Informal votes		1,497	4.41	+0.34
Turnout		33,946	88.16	−0.33
Two-party-preferred result
Labor	Jason Hunt	17,040	52.51	+5.92
Liberal National	Stuart Coward	15,409	47.49	−5.92
Labor gain from Liberal National		Swing	+5.92	

=== Elections in the 2010s ===
2017 Queensland state election: Caloundra
Party	Candidate	Votes	%	±%
Liberal National	Mark McArdle	11,068	38.0	−6.7
Labor	Jason Hunt	8,348	28.7	+0.1
One Nation	Rod Jones	6,576	22.6	+22.6
Greens	Marcus Finch	3,098	10.6	+0.9
Total formal votes		29,090	95.9	−1.8
Informal votes		1,234	4.1	+1.8
Turnout		30,324	88.5	+3.4
Two-party-preferred result
Liberal National	Mark McArdle	15,536	53.4	−1.3
Labor	Jason Hunt	13,554	46.6	+1.3
Liberal National hold		Swing	−1.3	

2015 Queensland state election: Caloundra
Party	Candidate	Votes	%	±%
Liberal National	Mark McArdle	13,021	43.84	−20.39
Labor	Jason Hunt	8,595	28.94	+6.50
Palmer United	Phillip Collins	3,071	10.34	+10.34
Greens	Fiona Anderson	3,026	10.19	−3.15
Independent	Barry Jones	1,991	6.70	+6.70
Total formal votes		29,704	97.75	+0.35
Informal votes		684	2.25	−0.35
Turnout		30,388	90.76	−0.71
Two-party-preferred result
Liberal National	Mark McArdle	14,223	53.82	−17.41
Labor	Jason Hunt	12,202	46.18	+17.41
Liberal National hold		Swing	−17.41	

2012 Queensland state election: Caloundra
Party	Candidate	Votes	%	±%
Liberal National	Mark McArdle	17,280	64.22	+14.16
Labor	Christine Anthony	6,037	22.44	−14.41
Greens	Allan McKay	3,589	13.34	+3.71
Total formal votes		26,906	97.40	−0.69
Informal votes		718	2.60	+0.69
Turnout		27,624	91.47	+0.42
Two-party-preferred result
Liberal National	Mark McArdle	17,915	71.23	+15.03
Labor	Christine Anthony	7,236	28.77	−15.03
Liberal National hold		Swing	+15.03	

=== Elections in the 2000s ===
2009 Queensland state election: Caloundra
Party	Candidate	Votes	%	±%
Liberal National	Mark McArdle	12,697	50.1	+4.0
Labor	Jody Tunnicliffe	9,348	36.9	−4.8
Greens	Roger Callen	2,444	9.6	−0.9
DS4SEQ	John Fogarty	519	2.0	+2.0
Independent	Mike Jessop	358	1.4	+1.4
Total formal votes		25,366	97.9	
Informal votes		295	2.1	
Turnout		25,861	91.1	
Two-party-preferred result
Liberal National	Mark McArdle	13,277	56.2	+4.3
Labor	Jody Tunnicliffe	10,348	43.8	−4.3
Liberal National hold		Swing	+4.3	

2006 Queensland state election: Caloundra
Party	Candidate	Votes	%	±%
Liberal	Mark McArdle	13,638	49.3	+6.0
Labor	Tony Moor	11,133	40.3	−1.2
Greens	Dave Norris	2,875	10.4	+2.9
Total formal votes		27,646	98.1	−0.2
Informal votes		528	1.9	+0.2
Turnout		28,174	91.2	−0.8
Two-party-preferred result
Liberal	Mark McArdle	14,280	54.4	+3.1
Labor	Tony Moor	11,947	45.6	−3.1
Liberal hold		Swing	+3.1	

2004 Queensland state election: Caloundra
Party	Candidate	Votes	%	±%
Liberal	Mark McArdle	11,259	43.3	+4.7
Labor	Christine Anthony	10,807	41.5	+5.2
One Nation	Ian Nelson	2,021	7.8	−11.3
Greens	Tony McLeod	1,943	7.5	+7.5
Total formal votes		26,030	98.3	+0.0
Informal votes		462	1.7	−0.0
Turnout		26,492	92.0	−1.2
Two-party-preferred result
Liberal	Mark McArdle	12,397	51.3	+0.3
Labor	Christine Anthony	11,789	48.7	−0.3
Liberal hold		Swing	+0.3	

2001 Queensland state election: Caloundra
Party	Candidate	Votes	%	±%
Liberal	Joan Sheldon	9,200	38.6	−3.2
Labor	Christine Anthony	8,658	36.3	+8.4
One Nation	Bruce Tannock	4,555	19.1	−4.9
Independent	Neil Wilkinson	1,430	6.0	+6.0
Total formal votes		23,843	98.3	
Informal votes		423	1.7	
Turnout		24,266	93.2	
Two-party-preferred result
Liberal	Joan Sheldon	10,637	51.0	−10.3
Labor	Christine Anthony	10,234	49.0	+10.3
Liberal hold		Swing	−10.3	

=== Elections in the 1990s ===
1998 Queensland state election: Caloundra
Party	Candidate	Votes	%	±%
Liberal	Joan Sheldon	9,625	40.5	−14.3
Labor	Don Wilson	6,680	28.1	−10.0
One Nation	Bronwyn Boag	5,930	24.9	+24.9
Greens	Louise Peach	1,086	4.6	+4.6
Australia First	John Goldsworthy	468	2.0	+2.0
Total formal votes		23,789	98.7	+0.3
Informal votes		305	1.3	−0.3
Turnout		24,094	93.2	+0.9
Two-party-preferred result
Liberal	Joan Sheldon	13,022	60.7	+2.6
Labor	Don Wilson	8,441	39.3	−2.6
Liberal hold		Swing	+2.6	

1995 Queensland state election: Caloundra
Party	Candidate	Votes	%	±%
Liberal	Joan Sheldon	11,562	54.8	+20.2
Labor	Don Wilson	8,041	38.1	−6.3
Democrats	Michael Reckenberg	1,092	5.2	+5.2
Independent	Bob Doring	400	1.9	+1.9
Total formal votes		21,095	98.4	+0.9
Informal votes		342	1.6	−0.9
Turnout		21,437	92.3	
Two-party-preferred result
Liberal	Joan Sheldon	12,056	58.1	+5.8
Labor	Don Wilson	8,703	41.9	−5.8
Liberal hold		Swing	+5.8	

1992 Queensland state election: Caloundra
Party	Candidate	Votes	%	±%
Labor	Joe Hannan	8,404	44.4	+4.4
Liberal	Joan Sheldon	6,536	34.6	+18.5
National	Liz Bell	3,973	21.0	−19.5
Total formal votes		18,913	97.5	
Informal votes		489	2.5	
Turnout		19,402	92.6	
Two-party-preferred result
Liberal	Joan Sheldon	9,668	52.3	+52.3
Labor	Joe Hannan	8,810	47.7	+3.9
Liberal gain from National		Swing	+52.3	
