= Electoral results for the district of Landsborough =

Queensland, Australia, district election results

This is a list of election results for the electoral district of Landsborough in Queensland state elections.

== Members for Landsborough ==
Member	Party	Term
Frank Nicklin	Country	1950–1968
Mike Ahern	Country	1968–1974
Mike Ahern	National	1974–1990
Joan Sheldon	Liberal	1990–1992

== Election results ==
=== Elections in the 1990s ===
1990 Landsborough state by-election
Party	Candidate	Votes	%	±%
Liberal	Joan Sheldon	7,407	30.5	+13.5
National	John Edwards	6,071	25.0	−14.5
Independent Labor	Francis Bowyer	4,639	19.1	+19.1
Independent	Peter Sawyer	4,017	16.6	+16.6
Democrats	Graeme Bowman	1,238	5.1	+5.1
Call to Australia	Rona Joyner	456	1.9	+1.9
Conservative	Raymond Kalms	431	1.8	+1.8
Total formal votes		24,259	95.3	−2.2
Informal votes		1,197	4.7	+2.2
Turnout		25,456	81.8	−9.4
Two-candidate-preferred result
Liberal	Joan Sheldon	15,644	64.5	+64.5
National	John Edwards	8,615	35.5	−20.4
Liberal gain from National		Swing	N/A	

=== Elections in the 1980s ===
1989 Queensland state election: Landsborough
Party	Candidate	Votes	%	±%
Labor	Frank Bowyer	10,538	40.0	+7.2
National	Mike Ahern	10,400	39.5	−10.5
Liberal	Garnet Ross	4,465	17.0	−0.3
Community Independents	Santo Ferraro	920	3.5	+3.5
Total formal votes		26,323	97.5	−0.7
Informal votes		683	2.5	+0.7
Turnout		27,006	91.2	+1.3
Two-party-preferred result
National	Mike Ahern	14,720	55.9	−5.7
Labor	Frank Bowyer	11,603	44.1	+5.7
National hold		Swing	−5.7	

1986 Queensland state election: Landsborough
Party	Candidate	Votes	%	±%
National	Mike Ahern	9,594	50.0	−6.6
Labor	Michael Cramb	6,285	32.8	+1.3
Liberal	John McCaw	3,311	17.2	+17.2
Total formal votes		19,190	98.1	
Informal votes		361	1.9	
Turnout		19,551	90.0	
Two-party-preferred result
National	Mike Ahern	11,813	61.6	−1.2
Labor	Michael Cramb	7,375	38.4	+1.2
National hold		Swing	−1.2	

1983 Queensland state election: Landsborough
Party	Candidate	Votes	%	±%
National	Mike Ahern	15,555	56.6	+2.7
Labor	Peter Byrne	5,101	18.6	−5.7
Labor	Gary Flanigan	3,537	12.9	+12.9
Independent	Ken Neil	1,647	6.0	+6.0
Independent	Donald Culley	1,351	4.9	+4.9
Progress	Dennis Marshall	296	1.1	+1.1
Total formal votes		27,487	98.7	−0.3
Informal votes		372	1.3	+0.3
Turnout		27,859	91.0	+2.3
Two-party-preferred result
National	Mike Ahern	17,576	63.9	−5.6
Labor	Peter Byrne	9,911	36.1	+5.6
National hold		Swing	−5.6	

1980 Queensland state election: Landsborough
Party	Candidate	Votes	%	±%
National	Mike Ahern	11,215	53.9	−14.3
Labor	Peter Byrne	5,051	24.3	−7.5
Liberal	Paul Kingsford	2,733	13.1	+13.1
Independent	Barbara Cansdell	1,795	8.6	+8.6
Total formal votes		20,794	99.0	+0.6
Informal votes		211	1.0	−0.6
Turnout		21,005	88.7	−2.2
Two-party-preferred result
National	Mike Ahern	14,453	69.5	+1.3
Labor	Peter Byrne	6,341	30.5	−1.3
National hold		Swing	+1.3	

=== Elections in the 1970s ===
1977 Queensland state election: Landsborough
Party	Candidate	Votes	%	±%
National	Mike Ahern	10,576	68.2	+0.5
Labor	Joan Kiely	4,922	31.8	+9.4
Total formal votes		15,498	98.4	
Informal votes		253	1.6	
Turnout		15,751	90.9	
National hold		Swing	−6.3	

1974 Queensland state election: Landsborough
Party	Candidate	Votes	%	±%
National	Mike Ahern	11,828	67.7	+13.4
Labor	Ivan Guy	3,918	22.4	−7.0
Independent	Paul Cowan	1,719	9.8	+9.8
Total formal votes		17,465	98.6	+0.1
Informal votes		252	1.4	−0.1
Turnout		17,717	89.2	−3.5
Two-party-preferred result
National	Mike Ahern	12,688	72.6	+6.9
Labor	Ivan Guy	4,777	27.4	−6.9
National hold		Swing	+6.9	

1972 Queensland state election: Landsborough
Party	Candidate	Votes	%	±%
Country	Mike Ahern	7,016	54.3	−9.0
Labor	Roger Jeffries	3,802	29.4	+0.4
Liberal	David Barker	2,106	16.3	+16.3
Total formal votes		12,924	98.5	
Informal votes		190	1.5	
Turnout		13,114	92.7	
Two-party-preferred result
Country	Mike Ahern	8,490	65.7	−1.9
Labor	Roger Jeffries	4,434	34.3	+1.9
Country hold		Swing	−1.9	

=== Elections in the 1960s ===
1969 Queensland state election: Landsborough
Party	Candidate	Votes	%	±%
Country	Mike Ahern	6,781	63.3	−8.0
Labor	Peter Venning	3,110	29.0	+0.3
Independent	Basil Nettleton	825	7.7	+7.7
Total formal votes		10,716	97.8	−0.7
Informal votes		246	2.2	+0.7
Turnout		10,962	93.6	−0.5
Two-party-preferred result
Country	Mike Ahern	7,358	68.7	−2.6
Labor	Peter Venning	3,358	31.3	+2.6
Country hold		Swing	−2.6	

1966 Queensland state election: Landsborough
Party	Candidate	Votes	%	±%
Country	Frank Nicklin	6,858	71.3	−2.3
Labor	Frank Freemantle	2,766	28.7	+2.3
Total formal votes		9,624	98.5	−0.7
Informal votes		150	1.5	+0.7
Turnout		9,774	94.1	−0.7
Country hold		Swing	−2.3	

1963 Queensland state election: Landsborough
Party	Candidate	Votes	%	±%
Country	Frank Nicklin	6,727	74.2	−5.6
Labor	Frank Freemantle	2,343	25.8	+5.6
Total formal votes		9,070	99.2	+0.7
Informal votes		70	0.8	−0.7
Turnout		9,140	94.8	+3.2
Country hold		Swing	−5.6	

1960 Queensland state election: Landsborough
Party	Candidate	Votes	%	±%
Country	Frank Nicklin	7,051	79.8	
Labor	Frank McLoughlin	1,768	20.2	
Total formal votes		8,837	98.5	
Informal votes		137	1.5	
Turnout		8,974	91.6	
Country hold		Swing		

=== Elections in the 1950s ===
1957 Queensland state election: Landsborough
Party	Candidate	Votes	%	±%
Country	Frank Nicklin	unopposed		
Country hold		Swing		

1956 Queensland state election: Landsborough
Party	Candidate	Votes	%	±%
Country	Frank Nicklin	7,176	73.1	−26.9
Labor	Vincent Crosby	2,645	26.9	+26.9
Total formal votes		9,821	98.9	
Informal votes		106	1.1	
Turnout		9,927	93.5	
Country hold		Swing	N/A	

1953 Queensland state election: Landsborough
Party	Candidate	Votes	%	±%
Country	Frank Nicklin	unopposed		
Country hold		Swing		

1950 Queensland state election: Landsborough
Party	Candidate	Votes	%	±%
Country	Frank Nicklin	unopposed		
Country hold		Swing		
