= 2001 Surfers Paradise state by-election =

A by-election was held in the Legislative Assembly of Queensland seat of Surfers Paradise on 5 May 2001. It was triggered by the resignation of sitting National Party member Rob Borbidge.

The by-election was won by independent candidate Lex Bell.

== Background ==
Rob Borbidge first entered parliament as the National member for Surfers Paradise at the 1980 state election. He became leader of his party in 1991 and Premier of Queensland in 1996, following the Mundingburra by-election. Borbidge's government was defeated at the 1998 state election, but Borbidge remained National Party leader, leading his party to landslide defeat at the 2001 state election. Subsequent to that defeat, Borbidge announced his retirement from politics.

== Results ==
The by-election was a resounding win for Gold Coast City councillor Lex Bell. Also of note was the performance of the Liberal Party, who performed considerably better than their coalition partner, the National Party; even though this had been a National Party seat since 1980. However, voters were outraged at being forced to the polls for the second time in three months, and took out their anger on Borbidge's replacement as National candidate Susie Douglas; the Nationals' primary vote plunged to only eight percent.

After this election, the Nationals effectively ceded Surfers Paradise to the Liberals, and would never contest the seat again before the merger of the Queensland National and Liberal parties into the Liberal National Party.

Surfers Paradise state by-election, 2001
Party	Candidate	Votes	%	±%
Independent	Lex Bell	7,966	35.91	+35.91
Liberal	John-Paul Langbroek	4,708	21.22	+21.22
Labor	Richard Alcorn	4,441	20.02	−18.25
National	Susie Douglas	1,784	8.04	−41.70
One Nation	Lesley Millar	1,055	4.76	+4.76
Greens	Dean Hepburn	926	4.26	−7.72
Independent	Perry Cross	751	3.39	+3.39
Independent	Tony Horkings	218	0.98	+0.98
Independent	Linda McGill	179	0.76	+0.76
Independent	Fred Fraser	77	0.35	+0.35
Independent	Arthur Coghlan	52	0.24	+0.24
Independent	Rob McJannett	15	0.07	+0.07
Total formal votes		22,183	98.11	+1.25
Informal votes		428	1.89	−1.25
Turnout		22,611	77.70	−10.49
Two-candidate-preferred result
Independent	Lex Bell	8,811	58.12	+58.12
Liberal	John-Paul Langbroek	6,350	41.88	+41.88
Independent gain from National		Swing	N/A	

== Aftermath ==
Lex Bell was defeated by Liberal candidate John-Paul Langbroek in a rematch at the 2004 state election.

== See also ==
- List of Queensland state by-elections
- Electoral results for the district of Surfers Paradise - Results for Surfers Paradise from 1972 to present
