= Hermann Vorster =

Hermann Vorster MLA
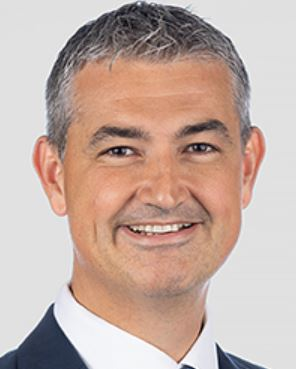

Member of the Queensland Legislative Assembly for Burleigh
- Incumbent
- Assumed office 26 October 2024
- Preceded by: Michael Hart

Councillor of the Gold Coast City Council for Division 11
- In office 19 March 2016 – 16 March 2024
- Preceded by: Jan Grew
- Succeeded by: Dan Doran

Personal details
- Born: South Africa
- Party: Liberal National
- Profession: Politician

Hermann Vorster is an Australian politician who has been a member of the Queensland Legislative Assembly since 2024, representing the district of Burleigh. Prior to entering the state parliament, he served as a prominent city councillor on the Gold Coast City Council between 2016 and 2024.

== Early life ==
Vorster was born in South Africa and raised in New Zealand, before moving to the Gold Coast at 15 years of age where he completed his secondary schooling at Somerset College. Following graduation, he enrolled at Bond University and completed his degree before pursuing a career in politics.

== Political career ==
Prior to his election to public office, Vorster had worked as the press secretary to Gold Coast mayor Tom Tate. He had also served as the president of the Young LNP.

In March 2016, Vorster stood for and was elected to the Gold Coast City Council, representing Division 11 (covering Robina and Varsity Lakes). He succeeded retiring councillor Jan Grew. Despite nominating as an independent candidate, The Australian reported in May 2016 that he had received "thousands of dollars worth" of free support from Liberal National Party members, organised by senior employees in the offices of Stuart Robert and Tate. The Gold Coast Bulletin also reported in May of the same year that he had established a residents' group, "Friends of Robina," with only three members, in order to advertise himself as the president of the group in campaign materials.

Vorster courted controversy during his council term by declaring that Chevron Island was "the home of drug labs" on the Gold Coast and "should be the subject of considered gentrification efforts." Vorster was the target of harassment from a number of hoon groups, after vocally working on efforts to reduce hooning in Robina.

Vorster is a supporter of the Gold Coast offshore cruise ship terminal proposal.

In October 2023, it was reported that Vorster would retire from the Gold Coast City Council at the 2024 council election, as he had been preselected by the Liberal National Party as their candidate for the Legislative Assembly seat of Burleigh, succeeding retiring incumbent Michael Hart.
