= Electoral district of Landsborough =

Former state electoral district of Queensland, Australia

Landsborough Queensland—Legislative Assembly
- State: Queensland
- Dates current: 1950–1992
- Namesake: Landsborough

Landsborough was an electoral district of the Legislative Assembly in the Australian state of Queensland from 1950 to 1992. The district was based on the Sunshine Coast.

Landsborough was first created for the 1950 state election out of the districts of Murrumba and Stanley, the latter of which was abolished. The district was won by then Country Party leader Frank Nicklin, hitherto the member for Murrumba. Nicklin went on to serve as Premier of Queensland from 1957 to 1968. He retired at the 1972 state election and was succeeded by fellow Country Party candidate Mike Ahern. Ahern would also go on to become Queensland Premier from 1987 to 1989.

Ahern retired in 1990, triggering a by-election that was won by Liberal Party candidate Joan Sheldon. Like her two predecessors, Sheldon became leader of her party, assuming the role in 1991. Landsborough was abolished at the 1992 state election, and was divided between the new districts of Caloundra and Mooloolah, with parts also added to the existing district of Nicklin. Sheldon became the member for Caloundra and served as Deputy Premier from 1996 to 1998.

== Members for Landsborough ==
Member	Party	Term
Frank Nicklin	Country	1950–1968
Mike Ahern	Country	1968–1974
Mike Ahern	National	1974–1990
Joan Sheldon	Liberal	1990–1992

== See also ==
- Electoral districts of Queensland
- Members of the Queensland Legislative Assembly by year
- Category:Members of the Queensland Legislative Assembly by name
