= Jason Hunt =

Australian politician

Jason Hunt MP

Member of the Queensland Parliament for Caloundra
- In office 31 October 2020 – 26 October 2024
- Preceded by: Mark McArdle
- Succeeded by: Kendall Morton

Personal details
- Born: Jason Edward Hunt; 3 January 1970 (age 56)
- Party: Labor
- Education: Queensland University of Technology
- Website: www.jasonhuntmp.com

Jason Edward Hunt (born 3 January 1970) is an Australian politician who served as the Labor member for Caloundra in the Legislative Assembly of Queensland from 2020 to 2024.

After contesting in both the 2015 and 2017 elections, Hunt won the seat of Caloundra at the 2020 election, succeeding retiring LNP member Mark McArdle, and defeating the new LNP challenger Stuart Coward. It became the first time a Labor candidate had won the seat of Caloundra.

== Career ==
Prior to election, Hunt served in the Australian Regular Army in the 2/14th Light Horse Regiment from 1988 to 1994 where he earned The Australian Defence Medal and The National Medal. He then went on to serve as a Custodial Corrective Officer for the Queensland Department of Corrective Services for 21 years.

Parliament of Queensland
Preceded by Mark McArdle	Member for Caloundra; 2020–2024	Succeeded by Kendall Morton
