= Kendall Morton =

Australian politician

Kendall Hatcher MP

Member of the Queensland Legislative Assembly for Caloundra
- Incumbent
- Assumed office 26 October 2024
- Preceded by: Jason Hunt
- Constituency: Caloundra

Personal details
- Born: 13 October 1983 (age 43) Ulverstone, Tasmaina
- Party: Liberal National
- Spouse: Michael Hatcher
- Children: Coty, Rafe, JJ and Tula

Kendall Hatcher is an Australian politician. She was elected member of the Legislative Assembly of Queensland for Caloundra in the 2024 Queensland state election.

Hatcher is a local businesswoman. She is a former teacher.

Hatcher lives in Caloundra with her four children and husband Michael.

Parliament of Queensland
| Preceded by Jason Hunt | Member for Caloundra; 2024–present | Incumbent |
