= Electoral district of Burleigh =

State electoral district of Queensland, Australia

Burleigh Queensland—Legislative Assembly
- Electoral map of Burleigh 2017
- State: Queensland
- MP: Hermann Vorster
- Party: Liberal National
- Namesake: Burleigh Heads
- Electors: 38,009 (2024)
- Area: 30 km^{2} (11.6 sq mi)
- Demographic: Outer-metropolitan
- Coordinates: 28°5′S 153°26′E
Electorates around Burleigh:
Mudgeeraba	Mermaid Beach	Coral Sea
Mudgeeraba	Burleigh	Coral Sea
Currumbin	Currumbin	Currumbin

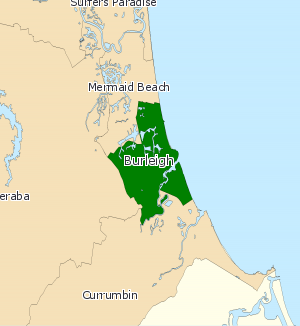
Electoral map of Burleigh 2008

Burleigh is an electoral division in the Legislative Assembly of Queensland in Australia.

The division of Burleigh is located on the southern Gold Coast, centred on Burleigh Heads. It includes the Gold Coast suburbs of Burleigh Heads, Burleigh Waters, Palm Beach and parts of Varsity Lakes and Tallebudgera.

== Members for Burleigh ==
Member	Party	Term
Judy Gamin	National	1992–2001
Christine Smith	Labor	2001–2012
Michael Hart	Liberal National	2012–2024
Hermann Vorster	Liberal National	2024–present

== Election results ==
2024 Queensland state election: Burleigh
Party	Candidate	Votes	%	±%
Liberal National	Hermann Vorster	15,002	49.81	+10.10
Labor	Claire Carlin	7,370	24.47	−11.40
Greens	Hunter Grove-McGrath	2,511	8.34	−0.97
Libertarian	Cathy Osborne	1,616	5.36	+5.36
One Nation	Eliot Tasses	1,315	4.36	−2.79
Legalise Cannabis	Jason Gann	996	3.31	−0.36
Animal Justice	Amelia Dunn	878	2.91	−0.30
Family First	Neena Tester	433	1.44	+1.44
Total formal votes		30,121	93.99	−1.81
Informal votes		1,926	6.01	+1.81
Turnout		32,047	84.31	−1.19
Two-party-preferred result
Liberal National	Hermann Vorster	18,902	62.75	+11.54
Labor	Claire Carlin	11,219	37.25	−11.54
Liberal National hold		Swing	+11.54	

Primary vote results in Burleigh (Parties that have never gotten 5% of the vote are omitted)
Liberal National

Liberal
National

Labor
Greens
One Nation
Australian Democrats
Katter's Australian
Palmer United/United Australia Party
View source data.
Two-party-preferred vote vote results in Burleigh View source data.
