= Rob Borbidge =

Premier of Queensland from 1996 to 1998

The Honourable Rob Borbidge AO
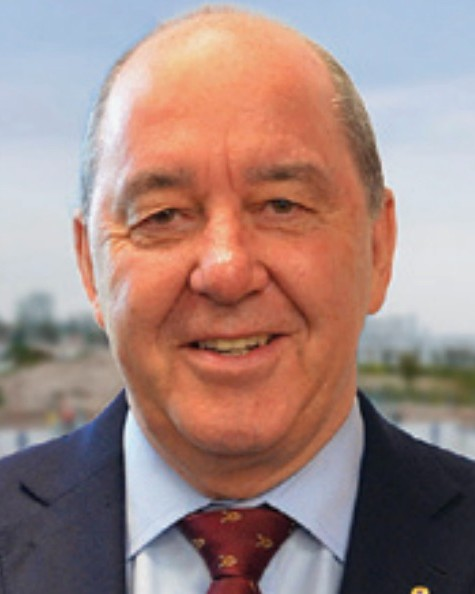
- Borbidge in 2015

35th Premier of Queensland
- In office 19 February 1996 – 20 June 1998
- Monarch: Elizabeth II
- Governor: Leneen Forde; Peter Arnison
- Deputy: Joan Sheldon
- Preceded by: Wayne Goss
- Succeeded by: Peter Beattie

28th Leader of the Opposition in Queensland Elections: 1992, 1995, 2001
- In office 29 June 1998 – 2 March 2001
- Deputy: Mike Horan; Lawrence Springborg
- Preceded by: Peter Beattie
- Succeeded by: Mike Horan
- In office 10 December 1991 – 19 February 1996
- Deputy: Brian Littleproud; Kev Lingard; Joan Sheldon
- Preceded by: Russell Cooper
- Succeeded by: Peter Beattie

11th Leader of the National Party in Queensland
- In office 10 December 1991 – 2 March 2001
- Deputy: Brian Littleproud; Kev Lingard; Mike Horan; Lawrence Springborg
- Preceded by: Russell Cooper
- Succeeded by: Mike Horan

Deputy Leader of the Queensland National Party
- In office 13 December 1989 – 10 December 1991
- Leader: Russell Cooper
- Preceded by: Bill Gunn
- Succeeded by: Brian Littleproud

Minister for Environment, Conservation and Forestry
- In office 25 September 1989 – 7 December 1989
- Premier: Russell Cooper
- Preceded by: Geoff Muntz
- Succeeded by: Pat Comben

Minister for Police and Emergency Services
- In office 31 August 1989 – 25 September 1989
- Premier: Mike Ahern
- Preceded by: Russell Cooper
- Succeeded by: Vince Lester (Police); Tony FitzGerald (Emergency Services)

Minister for Tourism
- In office 19 January 1989 – 7 December 1989
- Premier: Mike Ahern; Russell Cooper
- Preceded by: Geoff Muntz
- Succeeded by: Bob Gibbs

Minister for Industry, Small Business, Communications and Technology
- In office 9 December 1987 – 31 August 1989
- Premier: Mike Ahern
- Preceded by: Peter McKechnie (Industry and Technology); Vince Lester (Small Business)
- Succeeded by: Huan Fraser

Member of the Queensland Legislative Assembly for Surfers Paradise
- In office 29 November 1980 – 20 March 2001
- Preceded by: Bruce Bishop
- Succeeded by: Lex Bell

Personal details
- Born: Robert Edward Borbidge; 12 August 1954 (age 71) Ararat, Victoria, Australia
- Party: National Party
- Occupation: Motelier

Robert Edward Borbidge (born 12 August 1954) is an Australian former politician who served as the 35th Premier of Queensland from 1996 to 1998. He was the leader of the Queensland branch of the National Party from 1991 to 2001, and was the last member of that party to serve as premier, as it merged to become the Liberal National Party of Queensland in 2008.

His term as premier was contemporaneous with the rise of the One Nation Party of Pauline Hanson, which would see him lose office within two years. Borbidge was the member of the Queensland Legislative Assembly for Surfers Paradise from 1980 to 2001 and served as a minister in the Ahern and Cooper governments.

== Early life ==
Borbidge was born in the town of Ararat, Victoria in 1954. His parents owned a sheep property and were attracted to Queensland by Premier Joh Bjelke-Petersen's abolition of death duties, moving to the Gold Coast. He worked in his family motel business. At this time, the Gold Coast was the home of the property development boom that the Bjelke-Petersen government actively fostered, working in close co-operation with a group of developers known as the "white-shoe brigade".

== Parliamentary and ministerial career ==
In an attempt to broaden its electoral base and reduce the influence of its coalition partner, the Liberal Party, the Country Party renamed itself as the National Party in 1974. Also in the mid-1970s, it began a concerted effort to retake seats in the Gold Coast. The area had been a National stronghold until the 1960s, but growing urbanization resulted in the Liberals taking most of the seats there. This was part of the Nationals' broader strategy of contesting seats in urbanised areas outside of its rural heartland. As a sign of this, in 1980 Borbidge contested and won the seat of Surfers Paradise from sitting Liberal member Bruce Bishop, who had alleged corruption in property development by the Bjelke-Petersen government.

By the late 1980s, the scandal of the extreme corruption revealed by the Fitzgerald Inquiry had engulfed Bjelke-Petersen, who was replaced as Premier and National Party leader in 1987 by Mike Ahern. Borbidge, as a member of the new generation of Nationals untouched by political scandal, was promoted by Ahern to Cabinet as Minister for Small Business, Communications and Technology. He received the important portfolio of Tourism in 1989 and was briefly made Minister for Police, Emergency Services and Tourism by Ahern's successor Russell Cooper before he lost office at the hands of the Labor Party's Wayne Goss in the 1989 election.

== National Party leadership ==
In the post-election party room ballot, Borbidge was elected deputy leader of the party, and hence Deputy Leader of the Opposition. He was also made Shadow Minister for Small Business, Manufacturing and Regional Development.

The shell-shocked Nationals worked at rebuilding the Coalition with the Liberals, which had been torn apart seven years earlier, and adjusting to opposition after 32 years in office. In December 1991 an inquiry by the Criminal Justice Commission was announced to investigate irregularities in the travel allowances of members of Parliament. Cooper announced that he was one of the individuals under investigation and resigned as National Party leader in favour of Borbidge.

In the lead-up to the 1992 election Borbidge attempted to make overtures to the Liberals about reforming the coalition, but was rebuffed by the Liberals, who were aiming to finally achieve long-awaited senior coalition party status in Queensland after having been the junior partner since 1925. This did not eventuate; Goss remained in office, and the chastened parties discussed merging before agreeing to sign a new coalition agreement.

Borbidge and Liberal leader Joan Sheldon initially failed to make much headway against the Goss government, with some disgruntled Nationals comparing Borbidge unfavourably to Bjelke-Petersen. In response to speculation about the leadership, Borbidge called a spill for the leadership in June 1994. He was re-elected unopposed.

The Goss government's fortunes suffered a sharp reversal when it announced plans to construct a bypass through areas of bushland that comprised significant reserves of koala habitats. Borbidge harnessed the ground swell of opposition arising from this and other controversial decisions to encourage a large protest vote. Combined with the cynical mood engendered by the unpopular Keating Labor federal government, this protest vote nearly destroyed the Goss government's majority in the July 1995 election. While the Coalition won the popular vote, most of that vote was wasted on large margins in the Nationals' heartland. As a result, while it managed an eight-seat swing, it won only nine seats (out of 40) in Brisbane, allowing Goss to rely on a majority of one vote in the Legislative Assembly. The Court of Disputed Returns ordered a reballot after alleged irregularities in the narrowly Labor held electorate of Mundingburra, which the Coalition had lost by only 12 votes. In February 1996 the Liberal candidate, Frank Tanti, won the subsequent by-election. This resulted in a hung parliament with 44 Coalition seats and 44 Labor seats with one Independent, Liz Cunningham, the newly elected member for Gladstone. Cunningham announced that she would support the Coalition, and Borbidge became Premier.

== Premiership ==
Borbidge's government imitated that of Goss when it initiated sweeping changes in the public service when it won office. In some cases, figures who had been demoted or dismissed when Goss had come to power were reinstated to their former positions. Borbidge was criticised for attempting to stack the public service, but he counter-alleged that the public service was already subject to severe Labor bias.

The Borbidge government also initiated changes to the industrial relations system by introducing Queensland Workplace Agreements (QWA's), similar to the Australian Workplace Agreements later created under the Federal Liberal government of John Howard. Borbidge also supported Howard in his efforts to reform Australian gun ownership laws after the Port Arthur massacre, a move that brought him unpopularity in some traditional National Party quarters. When in 1997 the High Court of Australia expanded the recently introduced concept of Native title in bringing down the Wik decision (for which Borbidge criticised the bench as "historical dills"), Borbidge argued that Howard's proposed changes to the Native Title Act did not go far enough in abolishing native title from pastoral leases. However, the Act was supported by the National party federally.

The Borbidge government was almost immediately beset by scandal when it was revealed that, during the Mundingburra by-election campaign, Borbidge and Cooper (now Minister for Police) had signed a secret Memorandum of Understanding with the Queensland Police Union guaranteeing the QPU the repeal of unpopular Goss government measures, the power of veto over senior police appointments, and increased police funding, in return for a donation of $20,000 to the by-election campaign. This close relationship evoked many memories of the Bjelke-Petersen era, where relations between the executive and the police service were frequently close.

The matter was referred to the Criminal Justice Commission (CJC), a body that had been established on the recommendation of the Fitzgerald Inquiry and one that was regarded poorly both by the National Party and the Queensland Police. Retired New South Wales Supreme Court judge Kenneth Carruthers was appointed to lead the inquiry, which also investigated an allegedly improper agreement between the Labor Party and the Sporting Shooters' Association.

The government became embroiled in a war of words with the CJC, and Sheldon's first budget as Treasurer reduced funding for the body. In October 1996 the government announced an inquiry into the CJC itself. This had a dramatic sequel when after the new inquiry, led by retired Queensland Supreme Court judges Peter Connolly and Kevin Ryan, requested that Carruthers hand over all records from his inquiry, he resigned without completing his inquiry, alleging interference. The Carruthers Inquiry was completed by Bob Gotterson and Brendan Butler, who ultimately exonerated all the participants from facing potential criminal charges.

In June 1997 Carruthers and the CJC went to the Supreme Court of Queensland, applying for an end to the Connolly-Ryan inquiry. The Court closed the inquiry in August, stating that it had acted outside of its terms of reference and Connolly was compromised by bias. A subsequent motion of no confidence was passed in the Parliament against Denver Beanland, Attorney-General, with Cunningham's support, but Beanland, with Borbidge's support, refused to resign.

In the lead-up to the 1998 election, intense speculation surrounded the role that the new One Nation Party, formed in April 1997 by Queensland federal MP Pauline Hanson, would play. Hanson's positions on issues such as multiculturalism, gun ownership and native title were well received in the Nationals' heartland of rural and regional Queensland. Indeed, for much of 1997 and 1998, there was fear in National circles that One Nation could sweep the Nationals out of existence. The Nationals struggled to prevent leakage of their support to One Nation. The cynical mood in the electorate that Borbidge had harnessed to win office now began to turn against him, as he endeavoured to satisfy both the hard-line conservatives deserting the Nationals, and the urban Liberal supporters who detested Hanson and her views. Knowing the threat One Nation posed to his own party, Borbidge attempted to ensure that One Nation would be placed last on coalition how-to-vote cards. However, the organisational wings of both the Liberal and National parties rebuffed him and insisted that they would preference One Nation ahead of Labor (see Australian electoral system). This was done under pressure from the federal Liberal and National organisations, who apparently believed that One Nation's populism would strike a chord with Labor voters and thus peel enough of them off to keep Labor out of power.

In the 1998 election, the Coalition was severely punished for this stance, experiencing a 17.7% primary vote swing against it from 1995 and suffering an 11-seat swing. One Nation picked up 11 seats, and unexpectedly finished second in the primary vote, ahead of the Liberals and Nationals. Indeed, One Nation's showing was strong enough to render any attempt to calculate a two-party preferred vote meaningless. The Coalition was reduced to 32 seats to Labor's 44. Indeed, Labor was only denied outright victory when leakage of Coalition preferences allowed One Nation to win seven seats that would have otherwise gone to Labor. Labor only needed the support of one of the two independents in the legislature—Cunningham and Peter Wellington—to make Peter Beattie premier, while Borbidge needed the support of both independents and the One Nation MPs to stay in power. However, this was brought undone when Wellington agreed to support a minority Labor government. Borbidge promptly resigned.

Borbidge made little headway as Opposition Leader against Beattie. The Coalition reaped no benefit when One Nation imploded, or when an inquiry ended the careers of several Labor MPs—including Deputy Premier Jim Elder. Before the 2001 state election, Borbidge, remembering what happened three years earlier, promised that the Coalition would never preference One Nation again. However, several of his own MPs reneged on that promise after the writs were dropped. Beattie seized on this, arguing that this proved a Coalition government would only survive with the support of One Nation and former One Nation MPs. At the 17 February election, the Coalition saw its seat count more than halved, to 17 seats. Notably, it lost all but one seat in Brisbane. Amid this severe defeat, Borbidge created controversy when he immediately resigned from parliament, forcing a by-election in Surfers Paradise. The Nationals felt the brunt of voter backlash at going back to the polls for the second time in three months; their primary vote collapsed to eight percent, resulting in the election of independent member Lex Bell in the traditionally safe National seat.

As National Party leader, Borbidge led his party either on its own or in coalition with the Liberals to four elections but did not win any of them and only became Premier in 1996 as the direct result of the Mundingburra by-election. He was premier for only two of his nine years as National Party leader.

== Post-premiership ==
Borbidge was featured on the 23 April 2013 episode of The Daily Show with Jon Stewart for his stance on gun control following the Port Arthur massacre.

In 2013 Borbidge became chairman of the aero-medical organisation Careflight (since July 2016 known as LifeFlight).

Parliament of Queensland
| Preceded by Bruce Bishop | Member for Surfers Paradise; 1980–2001 | Succeeded by Lex Bell |
Party political offices
| Preceded by Russell Cooper | Leader of the National Party in Queensland; 1991–2001 | Succeeded by Mike Horan |
Political offices
| Preceded by Russell Cooper | Leader of the Opposition in Queensland; 1991–1996 | Succeeded by Peter Beattie |
| Preceded by Wayne Goss | Premier of Queensland; 1996–1998 | Succeeded by Peter Beattie |
| Preceded by Peter Beattie | Leader of the Opposition in Queensland; 1998–2001 | Succeeded by Mike Horan |
