= Bruce Bishop =

Australian politician

Member of the Queensland Legislative Assembly for Surfers Paradise
- In office 12 November 1977 – 29 November 1980
- Preceded by: Bruce Small
- Succeeded by: Rob Borbidge

Personal details
- Born: Bruce Edward Bishop; 25 August 1925 Maffra, Victoria, Australia
- Died: 20 May 2008 (aged 82) Gold Coast, Queensland, Australia
- Party: Liberal Party
- Spouse: E Waters (m.1972 divorced)
- Occupation: Retailer

Bruce Edward Bishop (25 August 1925 – 20 May 2008) was an Australian businessman and politician. He was a Liberal Party member of the Queensland Legislative Assembly from 1977 until 1980, representing the electorate of Surfers Paradise. He was also a prominent member of the Gold Coast City Council during the 1970s.

== Early life ==
Bishop was born in the rural Victorian town of Maffra and was educated at Romsey State School and Geelong College. He served as an Able Seaman in the Royal Australian Navy from 1944 to 1946, and was posted to HMAS Hobart. He supported landings at Tarakan in Borneo and Wewak in Papua New Guinea, participated in operations off Brunei and Balikpapan, and was present in Tokyo Bay at the time of the Japanese surrender. After leaving the navy in 1946, he worked for the Wells Organisation, an international organisation assisting churches in fundraising from their members, and also worked for the State Electricity Commission of Victoria for a time.

Bishop moved to Queensland in 1959, and initially worked with a local church. He subsequently opened a successful menswear business, with outlets in Surfers Paradise, Broadbeach, and Southport, later expanding to also include video rental and furniture hire businesses. He was elected president of the Surfers Paradise Chamber of Commerce in 1970 - the first of a record six times he would hold the office. In 1973, he was elected to the Gold Coast City Council, serving until his election to state parliament. He was also actively involved in the Liberal Party, serving as chairman and secretary of his local branch and as a member of the party's state executive.

== State politics ==
The late 1960s saw emerging tension between the Liberal Party and its traditional larger coalition partner, the National Party. The Gold Coast, which both parties laid claim to, was a particular area of contention, and at the 1969 state election, the Liberal Party endorsed Bishop as their candidate against prominent sitting National Russ Hinze. It was the first "three-cornered contest", in which one conservative coalition partner contested a seat held by the other, in Queensland. Hinze won after doing a preference deal with Labor, reportedly against the wishes of the National Party hierarchy, to direct preferences to one another ahead of Bishop. Hinze also won a rematch at the 1972 election. In 1977, by now a city councillor, Bishop embarked on a third attempt at state parliament, and a third challenge to a sitting National MP, when he was endorsed as the Liberal candidate against former Gold Coast mayor Bruce Small in the seat of Surfers Paradise. Small, a very prominent figure, was considered to be "unbeatable", but Bishop won an upset victory on Labor preferences.

In parliament, Bishop was an outspoken backbench critic of the Joh Bjelke-Petersen government, particularly on issues of corruption, and was associated with the emerging "Ginger Group" of Liberal MPs seeking to assert a stronger Liberal identity within the coalition. He crossed the floor on a number of occasions, and opposed a number of Bjelke-Petersen's initiatives, including his controversial anti-street-march laws. His outspokenness met with hostility from Bjelke-Petersen and his inner circle. In 1978, Hinze sacked the Gold Coast City Council, of which Bishop was still a prominent member, and appointed administrators. Bob Katter recalled one occasion on which Hinze, following Bishop having shouted "obscenities" at him during an anti-Liberal speech, physically charged at Bishop in the party room and had to be restrained. Bishop was also one of the Liberal MPs that the special branch of the police had under surveillance at the behest of Bjelke-Petersen prior to the 1980 election. Locally, however, he was a strong advocate for the economic development of the Gold Coast, and in particular its tourist industry, though he was suspicious of the influential "white shoe brigade" of politically connected property developers. He strongly advocated for the development of improved infrastructure and transport on the Gold Coast, and gave particular support to the construction of a casino in the area.

The continuing tension between the coalition parties was again evident at the 1980 election, and the National Party targeted both Bishop and fellow dissident Liberal Peter White for defeat. Historian Alex McRobbie noted that "it was estimated the Nationals spent more on winning the Surfers Paradise and Southport seats than they did on every other seat in the state combined". In addition, the National Party made a secret deal with the Labor Party, a key plank of which was their directing preferences to the National Party ahead of the Liberal Party in both seats. The National Party campaign was successful, as without Labor preferences, Bishop was resoundingly defeated by National candidate and future Premier Rob Borbidge, receiving only 32.8% of the vote despite his incumbency. After their defeat, Bishop and White both argued that the Liberal Party should seek electoral redistribution reform, and break the coalition agreement if the National Party refused.

Bishop remained a prominent figure in the Gold Coast business community until 1986, when he retired from the Chamber of Commerce and subsequently retired to Mount Tamborine. He briefly re-entered public life in 2004, vigorously - and successfully - opposing the planned sale and redevelopment of the Surfers Paradise Transit Centre and the Bruce Bishop Car Park, the largest car park in the area, and a project he had personally helped develop in the early 1970s to ease car parking shortages. He died on the Gold Coast in May 2008 after a short illness.

Parliament of Queensland
| Preceded by Bruce Small | Member for Surfers Paradise; 1977–1980 | Succeeded by Rob Borbidge |
