= Electoral district of Surfers Paradise =

State electoral district of Queensland, Australia

Surfers Paradise Queensland—Legislative Assembly
- Electoral map of Surfers Paradise 2017
- State: Queensland
- MP: John-Paul Langbroek
- Party: Liberal National
- Namesake: Surfers Paradise
- Electors: 35,065 (2020)
- Area: 24 km^{2} (9.3 sq mi)
- Demographic: Inner-metropolitan
- Coordinates: 27°59′S 153°24′E
Electorates around Surfers Paradise:
Bonney	Broadwater	Coral Sea
Southport	Surfers Paradise	Coral Sea
Gaven; Mudgeeraba	Mermaid Beach	Coral Sea

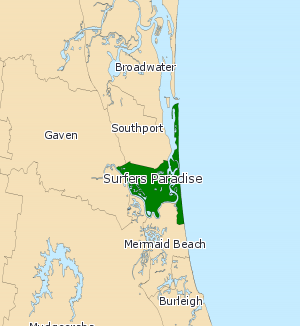
Electoral map of Surfers Paradise 2008

Surfers Paradise is an electoral district of the Legislative Assembly in the Australian state of Queensland. Located in the central portion of the Gold Coast, it is named for Surfers Paradise, the largest suburb of the Gold Coast.

While the Gold Coast has historically tilted conservative, Surfers Paradise has historically been a particularly conservative seat even by Gold Coast standards. It is one of the few areas of the Gold Coast where Labor has never been competitive at the state level. It was originally a National seat for all but one term from its creation in 1972 to 2001, with its best-known member being Rob Borbidge, the last National Premier of Queensland.

This tradition was broken after Borbidge resigned in the wake of the Coalition's massive defeat in the 2001 state election. Due to voter anger at having to go back to the polls for the second time in three months, the Nationals' primary vote plummeted to eight percent, allowing the former mayor of the Gold Coast, Lex Bell, to win as an independent. The seat reverted to form at the 2004 state election, in which Bell was defeated by Liberal John-Paul Langbroek on a large swing.

Since then, the seat has been one of the safest seats in Queensland for the Liberals and the merged Liberal National Party of Queensland, and has often been the safest LNP seat in the state. It is presently the LNP's fifth-safest seat, with Labor needing a 16.6 percent swing to win it. As a measure of how conservative this seat is, Langbroek suffered a swing of 10 percent against him in 2015, but still retained it with a comfortable majority of 19.2 percent. Langbroek served as opposition leader from 3 April 2009 to 22 March 2011 — the first member from the Liberal side of the merger to hold the post.

The seat is almost entirely within the equally conservative federal seat of Moncrieff.

== Members for Surfers Paradise ==
Member	Party	Term
(Sir) Bruce Small	Country	1972–1974
(Sir) Bruce Small	National	1974–1977
Bruce Bishop	Liberal	1977–1980
Rob Borbidge	National	1980–2001
Lex Bell	Independent	2001–2004
John-Paul Langbroek	Liberal	2004–2008
John-Paul Langbroek	Liberal National	2008–present

== Election results ==
2024 Queensland state election: Surfers Paradise
Party	Candidate	Votes	%	±%
Liberal National	John-Paul Langbroek	18,602	61.50	+3.8
Labor	James Knight	5,825	19.26	−6.24
One Nation	Mark Jaric	2,338	7.73	+1.53
Greens	Steven Everson	2,206	7.29	−0.91
Family First	Andrea Campbell	650	2.15	+2.15
Animal Justice	Haydn Jolly	627	2.07	+2.07
Total formal votes		30,248	96.05	
Informal votes		1,244	3.95	
Turnout		31,492	82.73	
Two-party-preferred result
Liberal National	John-Paul Langbroek	22,119	73.13	+6.93
Labor	James Knight	8,129	26.87	−6.93
Liberal National hold		Swing	+6.93	
