= Mark McArdle =

Australian politician (1956–2025)

- McArdle in 2017

Minister for Energy and Water Supply of Queensland
- In office 3 April 2012 – 14 February 2015
- Premier: Campbell Newman
- Preceded by: Stephen Robertson (Energy and Water Utilities)
- Succeeded by: Mark Bailey

Shadow Minister for Health of Queensland
- In office 20 February 2015 – 10 May 2016
- Leader: Lawrence Springborg
- Preceded by: Jo-Ann Miller
- Succeeded by: John-Paul Langbroek
- In office 12 August 2008 – 19 February 2012
- Leader: Lawrence Springborg; John-Paul Langbroek; Campbell Newman
- Preceded by: John-Paul Langbroek
- Succeeded by: Jo-Ann Miller

Deputy Leader of the Liberal National Party
- In office 26 July 2008 – 2 April 2009
- Leader: Lawrence Springborg
- Preceded by: Position established
- Succeeded by: Lawrence Springborg

Deputy Leader of the Opposition of Queensland
- In office 7 December 2007 – 2 April 2009
- Leader: Lawrence Springborg
- Preceded by: Bruce Flegg
- Succeeded by: Lawrence Springborg

Leader of the Queensland Liberal Party
- In office 4 December 2007 – 26 July 2008
- Deputy: Tim Nicholls
- Preceded by: Bruce Flegg
- Succeeded by: Position abolished

Deputy Leader of the Queensland Liberal Party
- In office 7 August 2006 – 4 December 2007
- Leader: Bruce Flegg
- Preceded by: Bruce Flegg
- Succeeded by: Tim Nicholls

Shadow Attorney-General of Queensland Shadow Minister for Justice of Queensland
- In office 28 September 2005 – 12 August 2008
- Leader: Lawrence Springborg; Jeff Seeney
- Preceded by: Lawrence Springborg
- Succeeded by: Stuart Copeland

Member of the Queensland Parliament for Caloundra
- In office 7 February 2004 – 6 October 2020
- Preceded by: Joan Sheldon
- Succeeded by: Jason Hunt

Personal details
- Born: 21 December 1956 Brisbane, Queensland, Australia
- Died: 14 August 2025 (aged 68) Pelican Waters, Queensland, Australia
- Party: Liberal National Party
- Other political affiliations: Liberal (2004–2008)
- Spouse: Judy McArdle
- Profession: Solicitor

Mark Francis McArdle (21 December 1956 – 14 August 2025) was an Australian politician who was Deputy Leader of the Opposition in Queensland. He was a Member of the Legislative Assembly of Queensland between 2004 and 2020, representing the electorate of Caloundra on the Sunshine Coast. Initially a Liberal Party member, in 2007 he became the party leader and the following year oversaw a merger with the National Party that produced the Liberal National Party.

McArdle held many parliamentary party positions, including stints as a Shadow Minister for Justice, State Development & Innovation; Emergency Services; Seniors; and Local Government. He also served as the Shadow Attorney General and the Parliamentary Liberal Party Whip.

== Political career ==
=== Member of Parliament ===
Official portrait as Member of Parliament

McArdle was first elected to Parliament at the 2004 Queensland state election, succeeding former Deputy Premier Joan Sheldon. In the 2006 Queensland election, McArdle was returned as the Member for Caloundra, taking a 2.6-point swing in his favour, and increasing his margin to 3.9%. Following electoral redistributions in 2008 prior to the 2009 state election, McArdle's margin was reduced to 1.9%.

He was returned to Parliament again in the 2012 state election. At the 2015 state election, Mark McArdle successfully defeated Labor candidate Jason Hunt to retain his state seat, despite a swing of over 20% against him. He was returned to his seat again, in the 2017 Queensland state election.

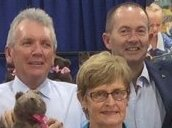
Andrew Wallace (right) and McArdle (left) in 2017

In June 2019, McArdle announced that he would retire at the 2020 Queensland state election in October.

=== Ministerial portfolios and parliamentary positions ===
McArdle served as the State Leader of the Parliamentary Liberal Party and the Deputy Opposition Leader, between 2007 and 2009. He was installed as a compromise candidate in the leadership contest of December 2007, after a deadlock between supporters of former leader Bruce Flegg and challenger Tim Nicholls. He was made Deputy Leader of the Liberal National Party after the Queensland Liberal Party merged with the Queensland National Party. After the 2009 Queensland election, Mark McArdle vacated his position as Deputy Leader, as did Leader Lawrence Springborg. Days later, John-Paul Langbroek was elected Leader with Lawrence Springborg as Deputy Leader.

Additional to his parliamentary party responsibilities, McArdle assumed the role of Shadow Minister for Health in August 2008, until the LNP's emphatic victory in 2012. Following the party leadership change, McArdle remained in his position as Shadow Minister for Health. After the Liberal National Party's landslide win in the 2012 Queensland state election, McArdle was appointed Minister for Energy and Water Supply by Premier Campbell Newman, overseeing long-awaited and modernising reforms in energy and water security, after a series of natural disasters and an historical drought.

In 2013, he revealed that he had prostate cancer, and took time off from his portfolio to battle the disease.

=== Party involvement ===
McArdle held many party positions as well, including as Chair of the Fisher Federal Divisional Council; Chair of the Fisher Business Branch; and as a Member of the State Executive of the then Liberal Party.

== 2006 election controversy ==
Prior to the 2006 election, McArdle, by then an emerging force within the Parliament, came under sustained criticism from the Labor Party and local media for his role in the collapse of mortgage schemes run by Boyce Garrick Lawyers. Premier Peter Beattie claimed that his role in the collapse made him unfit for such a leadership position. McArdle responded by pointing out that he was cleared of any fault in the collapse by the Queensland Law Society in its investigation in 2001. He ultimately retained his seat.

== Activities ==
McArdle took an active role in the administration of his portfolio. He regularly attended relevant conferences and met key industry executives.

== Death ==
McArdle died on 14 August 2025, at the age of 68, after a long battle with prostate cancer.

Parliament of Queensland
Preceded by Joan Sheldon	Member for Caloundra; 2004–2020	Succeeded by Jason Hunt
