= Eric Gaven =

Australian politician

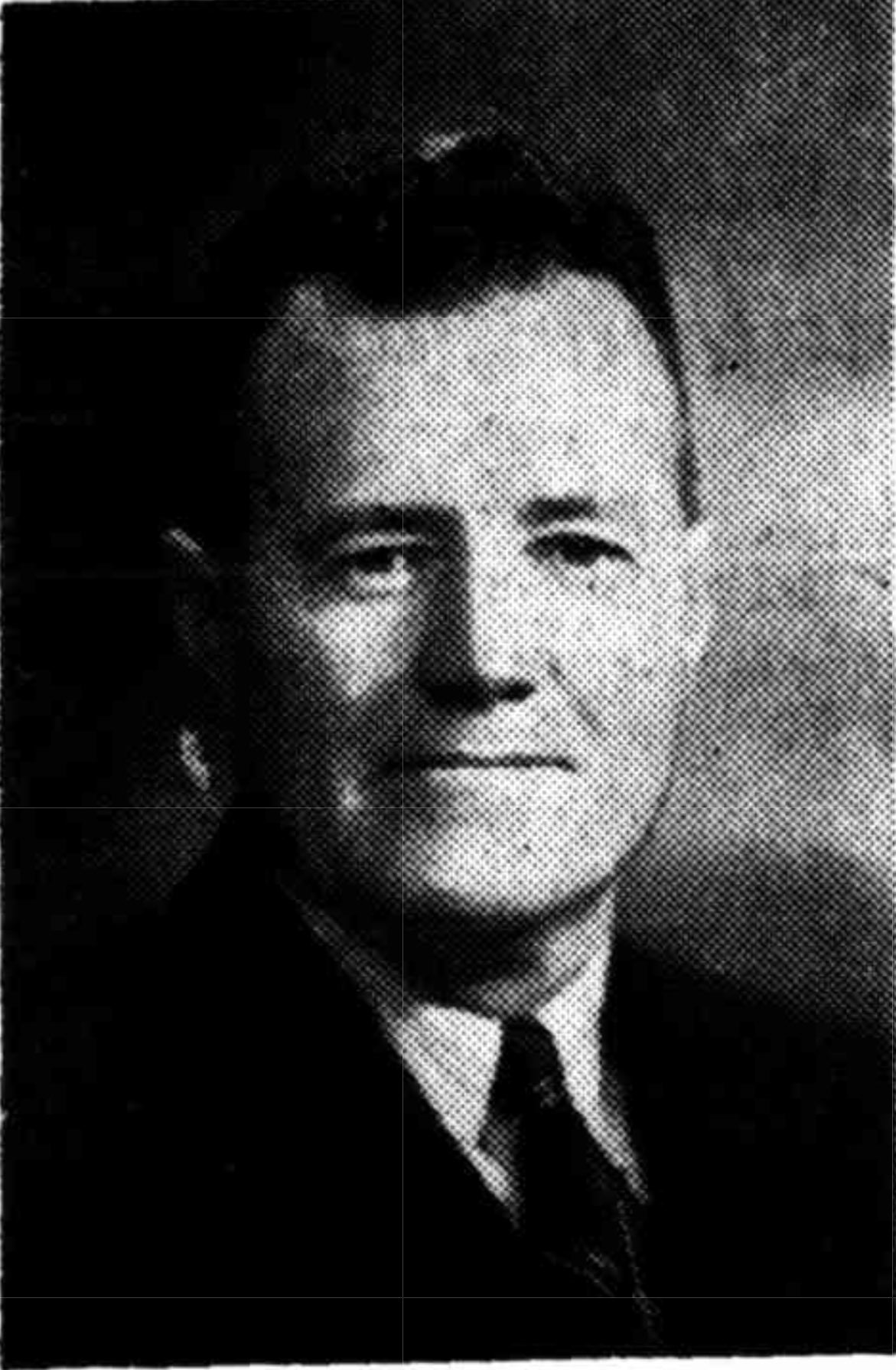
- Eric Gaven, 1950

Member of the Queensland Legislative Assembly for Southport
- In office 29 Apr 1950 – 28 May 1960
- Preceded by: New seat
- Succeeded by: Seat abolished

Member of the Queensland Legislative Assembly for South Coast
- In office 28 May 1960 – 28 May 1966
- Preceded by: New seat
- Succeeded by: Russ Hinze

Personal details
- Born: Eric John Gaven; 16 March 1905 Brisbane, Queensland, Australia
- Died: 18 January 1974 (aged 68) Southport, Queensland, Australia
- Party: Country Party
- Spouse: Janet Elizabeth Isabel Spencer (m.1930 d.1987)
- Occupation: Property developer

Eric John Gaven (/ˈɡeɪvən/; 16 March 1905 – 18 January 1974) was a member of the Queensland Legislative Assembly.

== Biography ==
Gaven was born at Brisbane, Queensland, the son of William Henry Gaven and his wife Emily Mary (née Price). He was educated at Dutton Park and East Brisbane and started his working life at a greengrocer in Woolloongabba. He then worked for the Postmaster-General's Department before running a banana farm at Upper Coomera. He then became a property developer on the Gold Coast.

On 15 February 1930 Gaven married Janet Elizabeth Isabel Spencer (died 1987) and together had two daughters. He died at Southport in January 1974 and was Cremated at the Mt Thompson Crematorium.

== Public life ==
Gaven was a councillor on the Nerang Shire Council from 1935 to 1949 and chairman of the newly established Albert Shire Council in 1949–1950.

He won the seat of Southport at the 1950 Queensland state election for the Country Party. He held the seat for 10 years before it was abolished for the 1960 Queensland state election and Gaven then won the new seat of South Coast, which he held until 1966.

He was a member of the Commonwealth parliamentary delegation to New Delhi in 1957. The seat of Gaven bears his name as does the Gaven Way, linking the Pacific Highway between Nerang and Broadbeach.

Parliament of Queensland
New seat	Member for Southport; 1950–1960	Abolished
New seat	Member for South Coast; 1960–1966	Succeeded by Russ Hinze
