= Bruce Small =

Australian politician

Sir Bruce Small OStJ, JP

Member of the Queensland Legislative Assembly for Surfers Paradise
- In office 27 May 1972 – 12 November 1977
- Preceded by: New seat
- Succeeded by: Bruce Bishop

Personal details
- Born: Andrew Bruce Small; 11 December 1895 Ryde, New South Wales, Australia
- Died: 1 May 1980 (aged 84) Benowa, Queensland, Australia
- Party: Country Party/National Party
- Spouse(s): Eileen Hayman (m.1919 divorced), Lillian Ada Mitchell (m.1939)
- Occupation: Bicycle manufacturer, Land developer, Company director

Sir Andrew Bruce Small OStJ (11 December 1895 – 1 May 1980) was an Australian businessman and politician. In Melbourne, he developed Malvern Star bicycles into a household name in Australia, then retired to the Gold Coast, Queensland, where he developed property, and as Mayor of the Gold Coast, promoted the area to Australia and the world as a family-friendly holiday destination through the bikini-clad meter maids in Surfers Paradise.

== Background ==
Bruce Small was born in Ryde, New South Wales, in 1895. At the age of 24 in 1920 he bought an interest in the Malvern Star shop at 185 Glenferrie Rd, in the Melbourne suburb of Malvern, from Austral Wheel Race winner, Tom Finnigan. His brothers, Frank, and Ralph Small, joined Bruce in his sales, building cycles at the rate of 5 per week.

The small cycle shop offered prizes in cycle races, resulting in Hubert Opperman winning a prize in 1921, and impressing Small so much that a job was offered to the young cyclist. Thus started a long relationship, as both friend and sponsor of Hubert Opperman.

With the Second World War affecting parts supply, Malvern Star bicycles started manufacturing many of its own parts for bicycles. Defence contracts help the growth of the business. At its peak after the Second World War, Malvern Star had 115 stores with 1,000 dealers.

After the war, Small's Malvern Star bicycles were ridden by Sid Patterson, who won the World Championship Sprint in Copenhagen in 1949, and several other races including amateur World Championship Pursuit in Liège (1950), professional World Championship Pursuit in Paris (1952), and professional World Championship Pursuit in Zürich (1953). At the 1956 Summer Olympics in Melbourne, Ian Browne and Tony Marchant won the gold medal in Tandem on a Malvern Star.

== Property development ==
From 1945 Bruce Small owned land at Gowanbrae and promoted property development in Strathmore Heights, in Melbourne. In 1956 he bought 40 hectares of flood-prone mangrove land on the Nerang River, on the Gold Coast. He retired from his Malvern Star business in 1958. From 1958 to the mid-1960s, he pioneered canal developments based on 'proven U.S. methods' from the U.S. state of Florida. Bruce Small was also the brainchild behind the development of 100 private "own your own" flats Edgewater Towers, St Kilda, Victoria which at 13 storeys was the tallest residential apartment building in Victoria at the time it opened 4 March 1961. Bruce Small's long-term friend Sir Hubert Opperman lived in the building from the time it opened until his move to a retirement village in 1985.

== Gold Coast Mayor and politician ==
In 1967, with the slogan "Think Big, Vote Small", he was elected Mayor of the Gold Coast, holding office till 1973. He was re-elected from 1976 to 1978. Like many politicians during this period, a time prior to the existence of conflict of interest laws, he saw no conflict between his duties as Mayor and his opportunities as a property developer.

After a season of cyclonic storms which battered the Gold Coast in 1967, Small was instrumental in promoting this area as a family holiday destination through widespread appearances and promotions of the Surfers Paradise Meter Maids, established in 1965, to attract tourists back to the area.

From 1972 to 1977 he was elected to the Legislative Assembly of Queensland representing the seat of Surfers Paradise for the Country Party (later renamed the National Party of Australia). He was knighted in 1974 for his services to the Gold Coast and Queensland.

== Recognition ==
Gold Coast City Council named the Sir Bruce Small Park in Benowa, and Sir Bruce Small Boulevard after him.

Small was posthumously named as a Queensland Great in 2024.

Parliament of Queensland
| Preceded by New seat | Member for Surfers Paradise; 1972–1977 | Succeeded by Bruce Bishop |
