= Electoral district of South Coast (Queensland) =

South Coast Queensland—Legislative Assembly
- State: Queensland
- Created: 1960
- Abolished: 1992
- Namesake: South Coast, Queensland

South Coast was an electoral district of the Legislative Assembly in the Australian state of Queensland from 1960 to 1992.

The district was based in the south-east corner of the state and included much of the Gold Coast.

== Members for South Coast ==
Member	Party	Term
Eric Gaven	Country	1960–1966
Russ Hinze	Country / National	1966–1988
Judy Gamin	National	1988–1989
Bob Quinn	Liberal	1989–1992

== See also ==
- Electoral districts of Queensland
- Members of the Queensland Legislative Assembly by year
- Category:Members of the Queensland Legislative Assembly by name
