= Christine Smith (politician) =

Australian politician

Christine Smith JP

Member of the Queensland Legislative Assembly for Burleigh
- In office 17 February 2001 – 24 March 2012
- Preceded by: Judy Gamin
- Succeeded by: Michael Hart

Personal details
- Born: 11 October 1946 (age 79) Sydney, New South Wales, Australia
- Party: Labor (until 2020)
- Occupation: Public servant

Christine Anne Smith (born 11 October 1946) is an Australian Labor Party politician. She represented the electoral district of Burleigh in the Legislative Assembly of Queensland from 2001 to 2012.

Prior to becoming an MP she worked with Centrelink.

Smith is a justice of the peace (qualified) and has been involved in many local community organisations. She is a member of the Qld Mental Health Association and committee member of the Gold Coast Branch, Palm Beach Police Consultative Committee, Burleigh Heads Lions Club, Girl Guide Trefoil Group, Creek to Creek Chamber of Commerce and an honorary member of the Burleigh Heads Scouts. She is also patron of various organisations including the Order of the Old Bastards, the Coolamon Chorale, the Gold Coast Horse & Carriage Club, the Miami Tennis Club, Care for Life Suicide Prevention and Burleigh Heads Pensioners Association. She is also vice-president of Palm Beach SLSC.

Smith and her husband Robert have been married for 41 years. They raised two sons and have two grandsons.

Their eldest son battled mental illness for many years, inspiring Smith to become vocal in the fight to raise the profile of mental illness and to seek more funding.

She publicly resigned from the Queensland Branch of the Australian Labor Party, after more than 30 years of membership, following the announcement of Queensland Premier Annastacia Palaszczuk's pick to run in her previously held seat of Burleigh in 2020, former Surfing World Champion Wayne Bartholomew.

Parliament of Queensland
Preceded by Judy Gamin	Member for Burleigh; 2001–2012	Succeeded by Michael Hart
