= Judy Gamin =

Australian politician (1930–2022)

Member of the Queensland Legislative Assembly for South Coast
- In office 20 August 1988 – 2 December 1989
- Preceded by: Russ Hinze
- Succeeded by: Bob Quinn

Member of the Queensland Legislative Assembly for Burleigh
- In office 19 September 1992 – 17 February 2001
- Preceded by: New seat
- Succeeded by: Christine Smith

Personal details
- Born: 18 July 1930 Broken Hill, New South Wales, Australia
- Died: 7 August 2022 (aged 92) Gold Coast, Queensland, Australia
- Party: National Party
- Relations: George Fisher (father)

Judith Margaret Gamin (18 July 1930 – 7 August 2022) was an Australian politician. She was a National Party member of the Legislative Assembly of Queensland, representing the district of South Coast from 1988 to 1989, and the district of Burleigh from 1992 to 2001.

== Personal life ==
Gamin was the daughter of Sir George Fisher, a long time chairman of Mount Isa Mines Limited and the first Chancellor of James Cook University of North Queensland, who died in 2007. Gamin was also aunt to LNP Senator for Queensland, Susan McDonald.

Parliament of Queensland
Preceded by Russ Hinze	Member for South Coast; 1988–1989	Succeeded by Bob Quinn
New district	Member for Burleigh; 1992–2001	Succeeded by Christine Smith
