= Michael Hart (Australian politician) =

Australian politician

Michael Hart MP

Shadow Minister for Housing and Public Works
- In office 15 December 2017 – 15 November 2020
- Leader: Deb Frecklington
- Preceded by: Stephen Bennett
- Succeeded by: Tim Mander

Shadow Minister for Energy
- In office 6 May 2016 – 15 November 2020
- Leader: Tim Nicholls; Deb Frecklington
- Preceded by: Andrew Powell
- Succeeded by: Pat Weir

Member of the Queensland Legislative Assembly for Burleigh
- Incumbent
- Assumed office 24 March 2012
- Preceded by: Christine Smith

Personal details
- Born: Michael James Hart; 19 June 1960 (age 65) Bega, New South Wales, Australia
- Party: Liberal National Party of Queensland

Michael James Hart (born 19 June 1960) is an Australian Liberal National politician, who is the member of the Legislative Assembly of Queensland for Burleigh, having defeated Labor Party member, Christine Smith, at the 2012 state election. He was re-elected at the 2015 state election.

Hart was born in Bega, New South Wales, on 19 June 1960. He is a qualified aircraft maintenance engineer. Before his entry into the Queensland parliament he was the director and CEO of Mastercut Technologies. He is a long-time follower and supporter of Surf Life Saving Queensland, having been president of the Pacific Life Saving Club in his electorate in 2011–2012, and subsequently the patron of the South Coast branch of SLSQ.

In 1986, Hart moved to the Queensland Gold Coast with his family, including wife, Sally, and three children: Tim, Hayden and Jessica.

In his maiden speech in parliament, he emphasised his belief in small government with minimal regulation, stating: "I believe good government needs to ensure the population is secure from interference from the actions of others. If a government just does that one thing, I believe it succeeds."

He served on the Infrastructure Planning and Natural Resources parliamentary committee in 2012, and was Deputy Chair of the committee in 2015 and 2016 (June). In May 2016, he was appointed Shadow Minister for Energy, Biofuels and Water Supply.

He was the Shadow Minister for Housing and Public Works, Shadow Minister for Energy and Shadow Minister for Innovation and Digital Technology until November 2020.

Parliament of Queensland
| Preceded by Christine Smith | Member for Burleigh; 2012–present | Incumbent |
