= Mike Ahern (Australian politician) =

Australian politician (1942–2023)

The Honourable Mike Ahern AO FTSE
- Ahern in 1988

32nd Premier of Queensland
- In office 1 December 1987 – 25 September 1989
- Monarch: Elizabeth II
- Governor: Walter Campbell
- Deputy: Bill Gunn
- Preceded by: Joh Bjelke-Petersen
- Succeeded by: Russell Cooper

39th Treasurer of Queensland
- In office 1 December 1987 – 25 September 1989
- Preceded by: Joh Bjelke-Petersen
- Succeeded by: Russell Cooper

9th Leader of the National Party in Queensland
- In office 26 November 1987 – 25 September 1989
- Deputy: Bill Gunn
- Preceded by: Joh Bjelke-Petersen
- Succeeded by: Russell Cooper

Minister for Environment and Health of Queensland
- In office 1 December 1986 – 25 November 1987
- Premier: Joh Bjelke-Petersen
- Preceded by: Brian Austin
- Succeeded by: Kev Lingard

Minister for Industry, Small Business and Technology of Queensland
- In office 7 November 1983 – 1 December 1986
- Premier: Joh Bjelke-Petersen
- Preceded by: Bill Gunn
- Succeeded by: Peter McKechnie (Industry and Technology); Vince Lester (Small Business)

Minister for Primary Industries of Queensland
- In office 17 July 1980 – 7 November 1983
- Premier: Joh Bjelke-Petersen
- Preceded by: Vic Sullivan
- Succeeded by: Neil Turner

Member of the Queensland Legislative Assembly for Landsborough
- In office 16 March 1968 – 16 May 1990
- Preceded by: Frank Nicklin
- Succeeded by: Joan Sheldon

Personal details
- Born: 2 June 1942 Maleny, Queensland, Australia
- Died: 11 August 2023 (aged 81) Caloundra, Queensland, Australia
- Party: National Party
- Spouse: Andrea Meyer (m. 1971)
- Education: University of Queensland
- Occupation: Grazier

Michael John Ahern (2 June 1942 – 11 August 2023) was an Australian National Party politician who was Premier of Queensland from December 1987 to September 1989. After a long career in the government of Sir Joh Bjelke-Petersen, Ahern became his successor amid the controversy caused by the Fitzgerald Inquiry into official corruption. Ahern's consensus style and political moderation contrasted strongly with Bjelke-Petersen's leadership, but he could not escape the division and strife caused by his predecessor's downfall.

== Early life ==
In common with most National Party politicians, Ahern had a rural background. His father, Jack Ahern, was active in the Country Party (now known as the National Party), in Landsborough and was campaign manager for Premier Sir Frank Nicklin. From 1964 to 1967 Jack Ahern was president of the Country Party. Michael Ahern was born in Maleny, Queensland and was educated at Conondale State School and Downlands College (Toowoomba).

Ahern went on to study agricultural science at the University of Queensland, afterwards became active in the Young Country Party. He was state president of the Young Country Party in 1967 and national president in 1968, as well as junior vice-president of the Country Party. He took Nicklin as a political mentor. When Nicklin retired in 1968, Ahern nominated to succeed him in his Landsborough electorate, located in the Sunshine Coast. He handily won election to the Legislative Assembly of Queensland in the ensuing by-election, being the youngest Country member of Parliament by nearly twenty years.

== Parliamentary career ==
When Jack Pizzey, Nicklin's successor, died, Ahern's prospects suffered a setback when the wily conservative Joh Bjelke-Petersen was elected as the Country Party's new leader. Bjelke-Petersen viewed Ahern with unconcealed mistrust. This was founded partly on Ahern's closeness to Nicklin, whom Bjelke-Petersen had resented; partly on Ahern's youth and intellect; and partly on Ahern's Roman Catholicism, unpalatable to Bjelke-Petersen as the son of a Lutheran preacher. Bjelke-Petersen was determined to stymie Ahern's ambitions to be in Cabinet. For these reasons, Ahern had a long wait for ministerial preferment.

Despite this, Ahern was chosen as National Party whip in 1972. He lobbied for Queensland to establish a system of parliamentary committees on the model of the Canadian parliament. Facing Bjelke-Petersen's opposition to such a system, he was successful in seeing established a Subordinate Legislation Committee and a Privileges Committee, the latter of which he became chair.

Ahern once again found himself at odds with Bjelke-Petersen in his role as chair of the Select Committee on Education. The Queensland Department of Education proposed two new additions to the social science curriculum, resisted by fundamentalist lobbyists as promoting secular humanism. Bjelke-Petersen immediately banned the two courses but faced a backlash from the Queensland Teachers Union and State School organisations. The government appointed the Parliamentary Select Committee with Ahern as chair to investigate. Ahern supported the recommendation that sex education be incorporated into the curriculum but was predictably vetoed by Bjelke-Petersen. Nevertheless, the committee's final report was eventually endorsed by the National Party and became policy.

After being passed over twice for a Cabinet post in the 1970s, Ahern nominated for the vacancy in the Deputy Leadership of the National Party in 1980—a post that de facto carried automatic Cabinet rank. Bjelke-Petersen was not willing to have Ahern as his deputy and potential rival, but could no longer justify keeping him out of the ministry. Sir Joh decided to placate Ahern by offering the portfolio of Minister for Mines while successfully running his own preferred candidate, Vic Sullivan, for Deputy Leader. Other portfolios held by Ahern over the course of his ministerial career were Minister for Primary Industries, Minister for Industry, Small Business and Technology, and Minister for Health and Environment. Ahern was significantly younger than most of his Cabinet colleagues, and was one of few members of cabinet with tertiary qualifications.

By the late 1980s the standing of Sir Joh Bjelke-Petersen (he was knighted in 1984) as premier had begun to be compromised by the failure of the disastrous "Joh for Canberra" campaign in 1987 and the establishment, against Bjelke-Petersen's will in 1987, of the Inquiry into Police Corruption and Other Matters led by Tony Fitzgerald QC. Facing internal pressure to resign, in October 1987 Sir Joh announced he would step down in 1988 after hosting Expo '88.

Shortly afterwards, Sir Joh threw his support behind a proposal to have the world's tallest building built near Brisbane Central Station, objected to by the Brisbane City Council and many sectors of the public. Facing objections also voiced within his own partyroom, Sir Joh met the Governor of Queensland, Sir Walter Campbell, in November with a request to allow him to purge dissenters from his Cabinet. Eventually Campbell agreed on 24 November to allow him to sack Ahern and two other ministers.

Sir Joh refused to call a party meeting to allow his opponents to request a leadership spill, so the management committee of the National Party called one for 26 November. Sir Joh boycotted this meeting, at which the spill motion was carried by a margin of 38–9. With Sir Joh not even in the room, Ahern won a three-way contest for the leadership, with Bill Gunn as deputy leader.

Ahern immediately wrote to the governor, seeking to be commissioned as the new premier. This normally would have been a pro forma request since the Nationals had a majority in their own right (as they had since 1983). However, despite not even having nominated for the leadership, Sir Joh insisted he was still premier. While it seemed that Campbell was bound by convention to appoint Ahern, he refused to terminate Bjelke-Petersen's commission until Sir Joh was defeated in the legislature. The situation where Queensland had a "Premier who is not leader" and the National Party a "Leader who is not Premier" only ended after four days when Bjelke-Petersen retired and finally handed the post to Ahern on 1 December. Ahern also held 8 other ministries including Attorney-General on a temporary basis until he could establish his ministry.

== Premier ==
As premier, Ahern faced a National Party that was increasingly riven between Bjelke-Petersen supporters and opponents, and a Fitzgerald Inquiry that was steadily provoking new revelations of official corruption at the very highest level during Bjelke-Petersen's tenure. Police commissioner Terry Lewis and several former cabinet Ministers were forced from their posts and convicted of criminal charges. Ahern, in a signature phrase, promised to implement the Inquiry's recommendations "lock, stock and barrel". Bjelke-Petersen worked actively to destabilise the government from outside of Parliament.

Ahern tried to change the image of what had been one of the most unshakably conservative state governments in Australia. He announced plans to reform the public service and the parliament, and sought to take a more consultative approach to governing. However, he resisted calls to abolish the "Bjelkemander," the rural overweighting that favoured the National Party. Ahern also brought in legislation relating to domestic violence and established the Southbank Corporation to redevelop the site of Expo '88 (now South Bank Parklands). Ahern oversaw the parliamentary dismissal of a Supreme Court of Queensland judge, Angelo Vasta, who had been adversely implicated in some findings of the Fitzgerald Inquiry.

The publication of the results of the Fitzgerald Inquiry in 1989 were seriously damaging to the Nationals, and all but negated Ahern's efforts to rehabilitate the government's image and distance the party from his now-detested predecessor. A Newspoll released after the inquiry came out showed that the Ahern government had only 22 percent support—the lowest ever recorded at the time for a state government in Australia. The damage was magnified by the fact that the Nationals faced a statutory general election that year, and polls showed Labor having its best chance in years of winning government. Indeed, if the result of the Newspoll had been repeated in an election, the Nationals would have been defeated in a landslide. In a harbinger of things to come, Liberal-turned-National Don Lane was forced to resign after admitting to rorting funds as a minister, and his Brisbane-area seat of Merthyr was resoundingly lost to the Liberals.

Although Ahern was not implicated in any form of corruption, hardline Bjelke-Petersen supporters blamed him for his alleged weakness and vacillation in allowing the crisis to engulf the National Party. On 25 September 1989, Police Minister Russell Cooper, a National Party traditionalist, successfully challenged Ahern for the leadership. The Nationals lost the election just two months later, ending 32 years of continuous National Party government. Ahern resigned from Parliament six months after the election and proceeded to a successful business career.

== Later life ==
After retiring from politics, Ahern undertook board roles with predominately technology companies. He served as chairman of Intrapower Ltd, Family Care Medical Services Ltd, McIntosh Financial Planning, Indue Group of Companies and NeuMedix Health Group. He also served as a director of Brisbane Markets Limited.

Ahern was a Fellow of the Australian Academy of Technological Sciences and Engineering. He served as chairman of the Australian Liver Foundation, a member of the board of governors of the ATSE Clunies Ross Foundation, also a member of the board of governors of the Queensland Community Foundation and was appointed special representative of the Queensland Government for Africa, The Middle East and India. He was awarded a Centenary Medal in 2001.

In the 2007 Australia Day Honours, he was appointed an Officer of the Order of Australia (AO) "for service to the Queensland Parliament, to economic and trade development through fostering primary production and international relationships, and to the community through technological, medical research, educational and charitable organisations".

In 2010, Ahern was a recipient of the Queensland Greats Awards.

== Death ==
Ahern died from cancer in Caloundra, Queensland, on 11 August 2023, at the age of 81.

Political offices
Preceded by Joh Bjelke-Petersen	Premier of Queensland; 1987–1989	Succeeded by Russell Cooper
Preceded by Joh Bjelke-Petersen	Treasurer of Queensland; 1987–1989	Succeeded by Russell Cooper
Party political offices
Preceded by Joh Bjelke-Petersen	Leader of the National Party in Queensland; 1987–1989	Succeeded by Russell Cooper
Parliament of Queensland
Preceded by Frank Nicklin	Member for Landsborough; 1968–1990	Succeeded by Joan Sheldon
