= Russ Hinze =

Australian politician

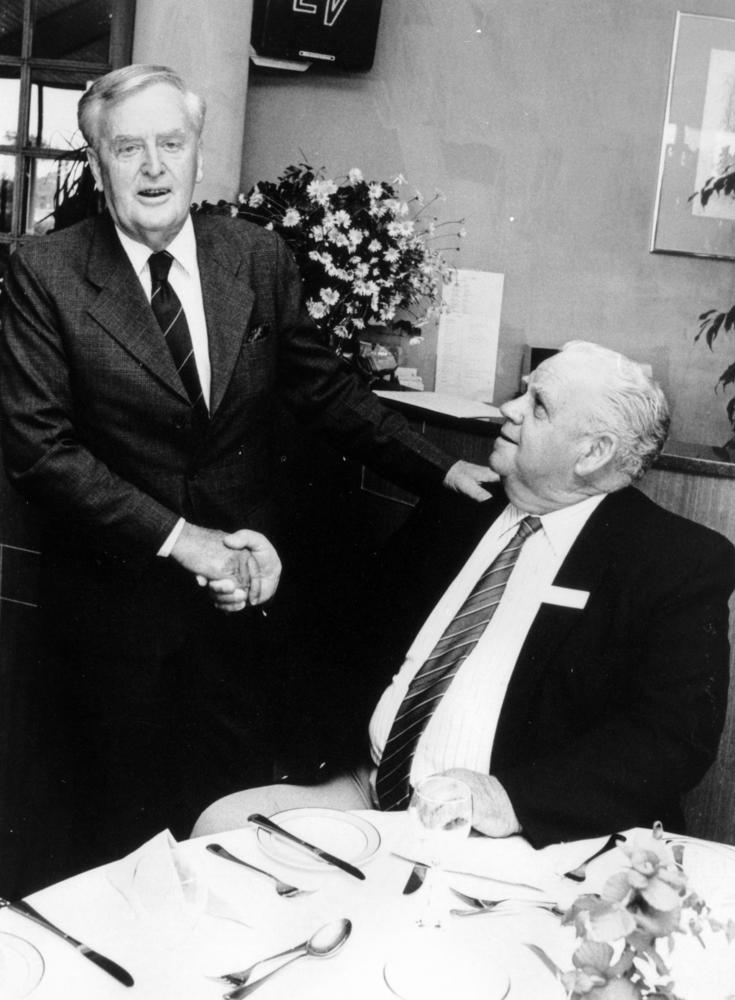
- Joh Bjelke-Petersen (left) with Russ Hinze, 14 October 1988

Minister for Local Government, Main Roads and Racing
- In office 6 December 1982 – 1 December 1987

Minister for Local Government, Main Roads and Police
- In office 29 July 1980 – 6 December 1982

Minister for Local Government and Main Roads
- In office 23 December 1974 – 29 July 1980

Minister for Local Government and Electricity
- In office 24 October 1974 – 23 December 1974

Member of the Queensland Legislative Assembly for South Coast
- In office 28 May 1966 – 25 May 1988
- Preceded by: Eric Gaven
- Succeeded by: Judy Gamin

Personal details
- Born: Russell James Hinze; 19 June 1919 Oxenford, Queensland, Australia
- Died: 29 June 1991 (aged 72) Gold Coast, Queensland, Australia
- Resting place: Lower Coomera Cemetery
- Party: National Party
- Other political affiliations: Country Party
- Spouse(s): Ruth Elizabeth Byth (married 1947 divorced 1981), Faye McQuillan (married 1981)
- Relations: Kristy Hinze (granddaughter)
- Occupation: Company director, Horse breeder

Russell James Hinze (19 June 1919 – 29 June 1991) was an Australian politician who was a member of the Queensland Legislative Assembly. He presided over an era of controversy that included the setting up of the Racing Development Fund, ministerial re-zonings and the licensing of Jupiters Casino. His career in public life spanned almost four decades, first in local government in the 1950s and 1960s, and then in the Queensland Legislative Assembly from 1966 to 1988. After his exit from Parliament he was charged with eight counts of corruption, but died before going to trial.

== Early life ==
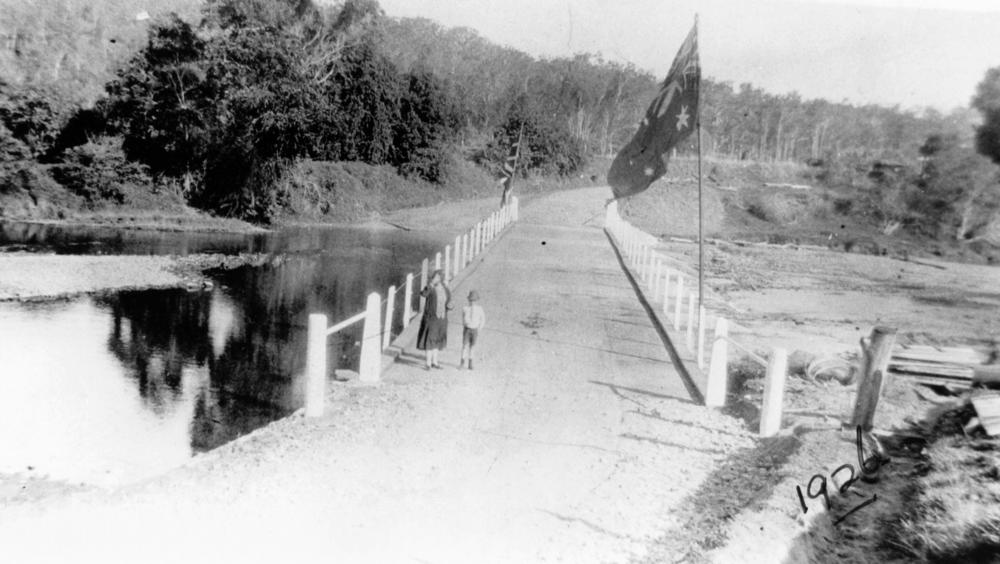
A young Russ Hinze and his mother at the old weir, Oxenford

Russell James Hinze was born on 19 June 1919 in Oxenford on the Gold Coast of Queensland to a German father and an Australian mother. His father was a dairy farmer.

Russ started his career as a sugar cane cutter. Later he took up dairy-farming; like his father.

== Politics ==
After becoming chairman of the South Coast Cooperative Dairy Association, he was elected to the Albert Shire Council in the early 1950s, serving as shire chairman for nine years from 1958 to 1967.

In 1966, Hinze entered the State political arena as the member for South Coast, representing the then Country Party. After eight years as a backbench member of the Coalition Government, he was promoted to Cabinet. In 1971, while still a backbencher, he was part of a plot within the Country Party parliamentary wing to topple Joh Bjelke-Petersen that failed only when Bjelke-Petersen broke a tie in the party-room meeting by voting for himself.

Between 1974 and 1987, he served as the Minister for Local Government and Main Roads. Between 1980 and 1987, he served as the Minister for Racing. Between 1980 and 1982, he served as the Minister for Police. These ministerial positions earned him the commonly known title of 'Minister for Everything'.

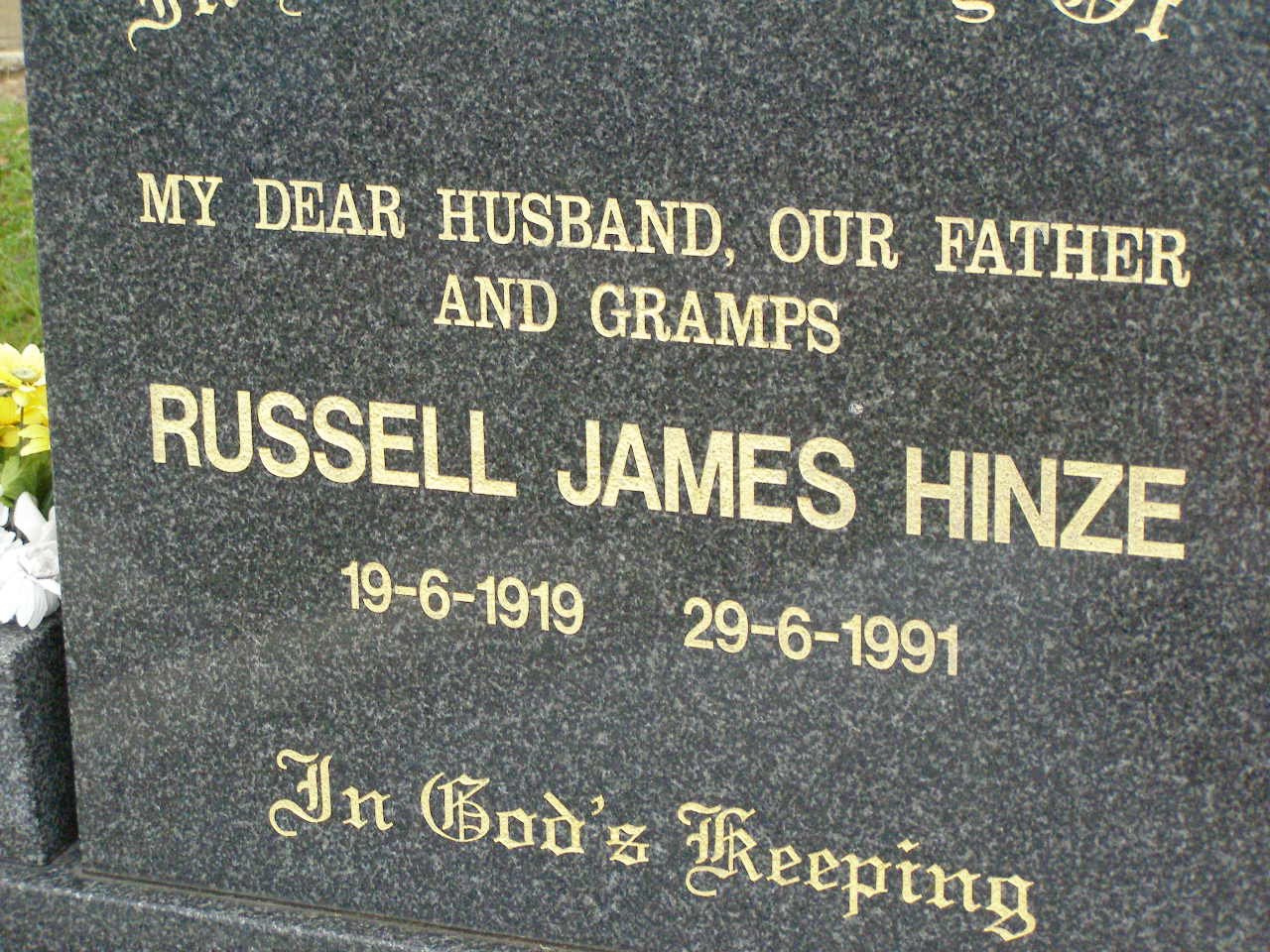
Headstone in Lower Coomera cemetery

In May 1988, Hinze resigned from Queensland Parliament after allegations were made against him during the Fitzgerald Inquiry, which was investigating corruption in Queensland during the Bjelke-Petersen era.

== Later life ==
In December 1989, Hinze was charged on eight counts of having received corrupt payments totalling $520,000. However, before the case could go to trial, he died from bowel cancer on 29 June 1991, at the Allamanda Private Hospital in Southport, aged 72. He was buried in Lower Coomera cemetery on the Gold Coast.

After his death, Queensland Deputy Premier Tom Burns remembered him in parliament with the following anecdote: "The best cartoon of him was the one that showed him as a bulldog. I saw him on television describing why he would rather be a bulldog than a mouse, but he was shown as a bulldog with dark glasses and a white cane outside a casino and brothel in the Valley that had a flashing neon light, saying he did not know there were any there".

Although the charges against Hinze were never proven in court, a trial in 1990, arising from the Fitzgerald Inquiry, saw businessman George Herscu convicted of paying Hinze $100,000 to enable a shopping centre development to go ahead. Herscu claimed the payments were for Hinze to purchase racehorses for him.

== Legacy ==
Hinze Dam was named in honour of local pioneers Carl and Johanna Hinze (grandparents of Russ Hinze) who lived in the valley that was flooded by the dam.

His granddaughter, Kristy Hinze, is a model.

== Sources ==
- Queensland Legislative Assembly (16 July 1991). "Queensland Legislative Assembly Hansard" (PDF). Archived from the original (PDF) on 27 September 2007.
- "ABC Radio National". Queensland: Ten Years After Fitzgerald.

Parliament of Queensland
Preceded by Eric Gaven	Member for South Coast; 1966–1988	Succeeded by Judy Gamin
