= Joan Sheldon =

Australian politician

The Honourable Joan Sheldon AM

26th Deputy Premier of Queensland
- In office 19 February 1996 – 26 June 1998
- Premier: Rob Borbidge
- Preceded by: Tom Burns
- Succeeded by: Jim Elder

Shadow Minister for Employment, Training and Industrial Relations
- In office 19 June 2000 – 17 February 2001
- Leader: Rob Borbidge
- Preceded by: Santo Santoro
- Succeeded by: Vince Lester

42nd Treasurer of Queensland
- In office 19 February 1996 – 26 June 1998
- Premier: Rob Borbidge
- Preceded by: Keith De Lacy
- Succeeded by: David Hamill

Shadow Treasurer of Queensland
- In office 2 November 1992 – 19 February 1996
- Leader: Rob Borbidge
- Preceded by: Doug Slack
- Succeeded by: David Hamill

Deputy Leader of the Opposition in Queensland
- In office 2 November 1992 – 19 February 1996
- Leader: Rob Borbidge
- Preceded by: Brian Littleproud
- Succeeded by: David Watson

Leader of the Queensland Liberal Party Elections: 1992, 1995, 1998
- In office 11 November 1991 – 23 June 1998
- Deputy: David Watson (1991–1992); Santo Santoro (1992–1995); Denver Beanland (1995–1998)
- Preceded by: Denver Beanland
- Succeeded by: David Watson

Member of the Queensland Legislative Assembly for Caloundra Landsborough (1989–1992)
- In office 28 July 1990 – 7 February 2004
- Preceded by: Mike Ahern
- Succeeded by: Mark McArdle

Personal details
- Born: 29 April 1943 (age 83) Bundaberg, Queensland
- Party: Liberal Party
- Education: University of Queensland
- Occupation: Physiotherapist

Joan Mary Sheldon AM (born 29 April 1943) is an Australian politician. She was a Liberal Party member of the Legislative Assembly of Queensland from 1990 to 2004, representing the electorates of Landsborough (1990–1992) and then Caloundra (1992–2004). She was the state Liberal leader from 1991 to 1998, and served as Deputy Premier in the Borbidge government from 1996 to 1998.

== Early life ==
Sheldon was born in Bundaberg, Queensland, and attended St Bernadette's Primary School and Soubirous College. She studied physiotherapy at the University of Queensland and subsequently studied for a time at Trinity College London. Sheldon operated a physiotherapy practice in Brisbane from 1978 to 1984, when she moved to Caloundra.

== Politics ==
A long-time member of the Liberal Party, she contested and won preselection for the National-held seat of Landsborough upon the 1990 resignation of former Premier Mike Ahern. She won an upset victory after Labor declined to stand a candidate, winning a 15% swing in her favour. In November 1991, she defeated Denver Beanland for the Liberal leadership, becoming the first female party leader in Queensland.

In 2010, Sheldon recalled that in 1990 when she first attended Parliament as a new MP she had an abrupt meeting with then Liberal leader Beanland by the elevators who immediately gave her portfolios.

As recounted by Sheldon, Beanland said to her: "Right, you've got the shadow portfolios of health, Aboriginal and Islander affairs and family services."

This portfolio allocation to Sheldon as a newly minted MP reflected the tiny size of the Liberal partyroom which had 9 members at the time.

=== Leader of the Liberals (1991–98) ===
An ally of Liberal state president Paul Everingham, she was seen as less hostile to the National Party than her predecessor.

Sheldon led the party to a resounding defeat in the 1992 state election, losing a seat to Labor amidst high-profile tensions with the National Party.

She supported proposals for a merger or coalition in the wake of the loss, and subsequently led the Liberal Party back into coalition with the National Party in November 1992, after nine years apart.

She subsequently served as Shadow Treasurer under Borbidge in the lead-up to the 1995 state election, which resulted in a one-seat victory for Labor. The result was reversed in February 1996 when a court-ordered by-election resulted in a Liberal victory, and the Liberal-National Coalition gained office with the support of an independent. Sheldon was thus sworn in as Deputy Premier and Treasurer under Borbidge and became the first woman in Queensland to hold these roles. During the transition period of 19 to 26 February 1996, she held several ministries including Attorney-General.

After the Borbidge Ministry lost office after the 1998 election Sheldon stood down as Liberal leader, with former deputy David Watson succeeding her.

=== Post Leadership (1998–04) ===
She remained on the backbench until 1999 when she became Shadow Minister for The Arts, Fair Trading and Consumer Affairs which after June 2000 became Shadow Minister for Employment, Training and Industrial Relations and The Arts.

From when the Coalition agreement with the Nationals was reinstated in 1992 to her retirement from the assembly in February 2004, she served as Shadow Minister for Tourism and Shadow Minister for the Arts.

== Post Politics ==
Sheldon was made a Member of the Order of Australia (AM) in the 2005 Australia Day Honours for "service to the Queensland Parliament, to support for a range of cultural organisations, and to issues affecting women".

Parliament of Queensland
Preceded by Mike Ahern	Member for Landsborough; 1990–1992	Abolished
New seat	Member for Caloundra; 1992–2004	Succeeded by Mark McArdle
Political offices
Preceded by Denver Beanland	Parliamentary Leader of the Liberal Party in Queensland; 1991–1998	Succeeded by David Watson
