= Lex Bell =

Australian politician

Lex Bell OAM

Member of the Queensland Legislative Assembly for Surfers Paradise
- In office 5 May 2001 – 7 February 2004
- Preceded by: Rob Borbidge
- Succeeded by: John-Paul Langbroek

9th Mayor of the Gold Coast
- In office 1988–1994
- Preceded by: Denis Pie
- Succeeded by: Ray Stevens

Personal details
- Born: Alexander James Douglas Bell; 13 July 1945 (age 81) Brisbane, Queensland, Australia
- Party: Independent
- Education: Bond University, University of Queensland
- Occupation: Solicitor

Alexander James Douglas "Lex" Bell OAM (born 13 July 1945) is an Australian politician. Born in Brisbane, he received a Master of Laws from Bond University and a Bachelor of Law from the University of Queensland before becoming a solicitor of the Supreme Court of Queensland. He was also on Gold Coast City Council from 1985–2001, including a period as mayor 1988–1994. He was also a chancellor with the Anglican Catholic Church.

On 20 March 2001, former National Party Premier and member for Surfers Paradise Rob Borbidge resigned from the Legislative Assembly of Queensland. Bell contested the resulting by-election as an independent. Due to voter anger at going back to the polls for the second time in three months, the National vote collapsed to eight percent, and Bell was elected with 58 percent of the two-candidate preferred vote. He held the seat until the 2004 state election, when he finished third on the primary vote, allowing his Liberal challenger in 2001, John-Paul Langbroek, to win the seat. Mr Bell announced in late 2011 he would contest his former council seat of Division 7 in Surfers Paradise which he regained on 28 April 2012.

Parliament of Queensland
Preceded by Rob Borbidge	Member for Surfers Paradise; 2001–2004	Succeeded by John-Paul Langbroek
Political offices
Preceded by Denis Pie	Mayor of the Gold Coast; 1988–1994	Succeeded by Ray Stevens
