= Electoral district of Caloundra =

State electoral district of Queensland, Australia

Caloundra Queensland—Legislative Assembly
- Electoral map of Caloundra 2017
- State: Queensland
- MP: Kendall Morton
- Party: Liberal National
- Namesake: Caloundra
- Electors: 38,503 (2020)
- Area: 227 km^{2} (87.6 sq mi)
- Demographic: Provincial
- Coordinates: 26°51′S 153°2′E
Electorates around Caloundra:
Nicklin	Buderim	Kawana
Glass House	Caloundra	Coral Sea
Glass House	Glass House	Pumicestone

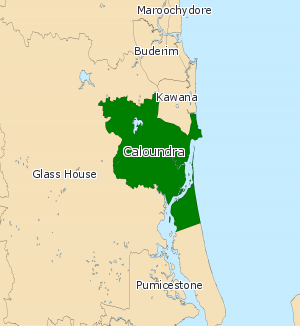
Electoral map of Caloundra 2008

Caloundra is a Legislative Assembly of Queensland electoral district on the Sunshine Coast in the Australian state of Queensland. The electorate is centred on the city of Caloundra and stretches north to Wurtulla, south to Pelican Waters and west to the Bruce Highway.

The seat was held by Mark McArdle, the first deputy leader of the Liberal National Party from 2008 to 2009, and prior to that state Liberal leader from November 2007 to July 2008. McArdle succeeded former Liberal leader Joan Sheldon upon her retirement in 2004. On 27 June 2019, McArdle announced he would retire from politics at the 2020 state election. The seat was won by Labor's Jason Hunt at the 2020 election, however was won back by the LNP candidate Kendall Morton at the 2024 election.

== Members for Caloundra ==
Member	Party	Term
Joan Sheldon	Liberal	1992–2004
Mark McArdle	Liberal	2004–2008
Mark McArdle	Liberal National	2008–2020
Jason Hunt	Labor	2020–2024
Kendall Morton	Liberal National	2024–present

== Election results ==
2024 Queensland state election: Caloundra
Party	Candidate	Votes	%	±%
Liberal National	Kendall Morton	16,771	43.10	+5.40
Labor	Jason Hunt	13,986	35.95	−5.36
Greens	Peta Higgs	3,237	8.32	−1.79
One Nation	Ben Storch	2,388	6.14	−0.05
Legalise Cannabis	Allison McMaster	1,406	3.61	+3.61
Animal Justice	Pamela Mariko	633	1.63	+1.63
Independent	Mike Jessop	486	1.25	+0.49
Total formal votes		38,907	95.10	−0.49
Informal votes		2,004	4.90	+0.49
Turnout		40,911	89.43	+1.27
Two-party-preferred result
Liberal National	Kendall Morton	20,159	51.81	+4.32
Labor	Jason Hunt	18,748	48.19	−4.32
Liberal National gain from Labor		Swing	+4.32	

2020 Queensland state election: Caloundra
Party	Candidate	Votes	%	±%
Labor	Jason Hunt	13,406	41.31	+12.62
Liberal National	Stuart Coward	12,234	37.70	−0.35
Greens	Raelene Ellis	3,281	10.11	−0.54
One Nation	Luke Poland	2,007	6.19	−16.42
Informed Medical Options	Belinda Hart	783	2.41	+2.41
United Australia	Trevor Gray	255	0.79	+0.79
Independent	Mike Jessop	245	0.76	+0.76
Independent	Mathew Hill	238	0.73	+0.73
Total formal votes		32,449	95.59	−0.34
Informal votes		1,497	4.41	+0.34
Turnout		33,946	88.16	−0.33
Two-party-preferred result
Labor	Jason Hunt	17,040	52.51	+5.92
Liberal National	Stuart Coward	15,409	47.49	−5.92
Labor gain from Liberal National		Swing	+5.92	
