= 58th Parliament of Queensland =

Meeting of the Legislative Assembly of Queensland

←	57th	59th	→

Overview
- Legislative body: Queensland Legislature
- Meeting place: Parliament House, Brisbane
- Term: 26 November 2024 – October 2028
- Election: 2024
- Government: Liberal National
- Opposition: Labor
- Website: www.parliament.qld.gov.au

Legislative Assembly
- Members: 93
- Speaker: Pat Weir, Liberal National (from 26 November 2024)
- Deputy Speaker: Jon Krause, Liberal National (from 28 November 2024)
- House Leader: Christian Rowan, Liberal National (from 13 November 2024)
- Party control: Liberal National (53)

The 58th Parliament of Queensland is the current meeting of the unicameral chamber of the Queensland Parliament known as the Legislative Assembly. The 2024 state election gave the Liberal National Party of Queensland a majority in parliament, winning 52 of 93 seats to defeat the incumbent Labor government. Following the election, Liberal National leader David Crisafulli became the 41st Premier of Queensland and was sworn in by the governor of Queensland, Jeannette Young, on 28 October 2024. The 58th Parliament opened on 26 November 2024.

== Major events and legislation ==
=== 2024 ===
- As part of David Crisafulli's election campaign, he pledged that the Liberal National's "making Queensland safer" laws targeting youth crime would be legislated before Christmas. Following Crisafulli's election victory, the Making Queensland Safer Bill 2024 was introduced to Parliament on 28 November. The bill featured the new government's "adult crime, adult time" policy, in which youth offenders would be sentenced as adults for a list of 13 offences designated as serious crimes, such as murder, manslaughter, break-ins, and dangerous operation of a vehicle. If found guilty of murder, youth offenders would also be given a mandatory life sentence with a minimum non-parole period of 20 years. Additionally, the bill would remove the principal of detention as a last resort. The bill passed Parliament on 12 December, with only Greens MP Michael Berkman and independent Sandy Bolton voting against the bill. The new laws came into effect the following day after Governor Jeannette Young gave royal assent to the bill.
- During the election campaign, Robbie Katter, leader of Katter's Australian Party and member for Traeger, announced his intention to introduce a private member's bill to repeal abortion laws upon the resumption of parliament. This resulted in abortion becoming a major talking point in the election, as uncertainty surrounded the possibility of a Liberal National conscience vote if such a bill was introduced. However, Liberal National leader David Crisafulli assured questioners that abortion was not a priority for his party and that there would be no changes to the law. During a sitting of parliament on 10 December, Crisafulli moved a motion to prevent any amendments to or discussion regarding the Termination of Pregnancy Act 2018 for the remainder of the Parliament's term. The motion passed in the affirmative with 50 votes to 38. Leader of the Opposition Steven Miles described the motion as "grubby", stating that it would prevent progress and was a sign that the Premier could not control his party.

== Leadership ==
=== Speaker ===
Following the opening of Parliament on 26 November 2024, Premier David Crisafulli nominated Pat Weir, the member for Condamine, for the position of Speaker. Leader of the Opposition Steven Miles endorsed the government's nominee, allowing Weir to take the position unopposed.

=== Deputy Speaker ===
On 28 November 2024, Jon Krause, the member for Scenic Rim, was appointed to the position of Deputy Speaker.

=== Government leadership ===
- Leader of the House: Christian Rowan
- Chief Government Whip: Mark Boothman
- Government Whips: Glen Kelly & Kendall Morton

=== Opposition leadership ===
- Manager of Opposition Business: Mick de Brenni
- Opposition Whips: Margie Nightingale & Mark Ryan

== Party summary ==
Membership (as of 26 November 2024) 1 Greens 36 Labor Liberal National 52 3 Katter's Australian 1 Independent

Affiliation	Party (shading shows control)					Total	Vacant
Affiliation	QG	IND	KAP	QLP	LNP	Total	Vacant
End of previous Parliament	2	1	4	51	35	93	0
Begin (26 November 2024)	1	1	3	36	52	93	0
12 May 2025 (Note: Jimmy Sullivan, MP for Stafford, was expelled from the Labor Party caucus on 12 May 2025 and began sitting as an independent.)	1	2	3	35	52	93	0
29 November 2025 (Note: Nick Dametto, KAP MP for Hinchinbrook, resigned from his party and the parliament in order to run in the 2025 Townsville mayoral by-election. A by-election for Hinchinbrook was held on 29 November 2025, and was won by LNP candidate Wayde Chiesa.)	1	2	2	35	53	93	0
9 April 2026 (Note: Jimmy Sullivan, an independent MP for Stafford and former member of the Labor Party, died on 9 April 2026. A by-election for Stafford will be held at a later date.)	1	1	2	35	53	92	1
Latest voting share %	1.08	1.08	2.15	37.63	56.99		

== Members ==
=== South East Queensland ===
▌ Leeanne Enoch (QLP—Algester)
▌ Bart Mellish (QLP—Aspley)
▌ Chris Whiting (QLP—Bancroft)
▌ Sam O'Connor (LNP—Bonney)
▌ David Crisafulli (LNP—Broadwater)
▌ Brent Mickelberg (LNP—Buderim)
▌ Di Farmer (QLP—Bulimba)
▌ Lance McCallum (QLP—Bundamba)
▌ Hermann Vorster (LNP—Burleigh)
▌ Kendall Morton (LNP—Caloundra)
▌ Russell Field (LNP—Capalaba)
▌ Steve Minnikin (LNP—Chatsworth)
▌ Tim Nicholls (LNP—Clayfield)
▌ Michael Crandon (LNP—Coomera)
▌ Jonty Bush (QLP—Cooper)
▌ Laura Gerber (LNP—Currumbin)
▌ Tim Mander (LNP—Everton)
▌ Mark Furner (QLP—Ferny Grove)
▌ Meaghan Scanlon (QLP—Gaven)
▌ Andrew Powell (LNP—Glass House)
▌ Joe Kelly (QLP—Greenslopes)
▌ Margie Nightingale (QLP—Inala)
▌ Jennifer Howard (QLP—Ipswich)
▌ Wendy Bourne (ALP—Ipswich West)
▌ Charis Mullen (QLP—Jordan)
▌ Jarrod Bleijie (LNP—Kawana)
▌ Shane King (QLP—Kurwongbah)
▌ Jim McDonald (LNP—Lockyer)
▌ Linus Power (QLP—Logan)
▌ Joan Pease (QLP—Lytton)
▌ Melissa McMahon (QLP—Macalister)
▌ Michael Berkman (QG—Maiwar)
▌ Corrine McMillan (QLP—Mansfield)
▌ Fiona Simpson (LNP—Maroochydore)
▌ Grace Grace (QLP—McConnel)
▌ Ray Stevens (LNP—Mermaid Beach)
▌ Mark Bailey (QLP—Miller)
▌ Christian Rowan (LNP—Moggill)
▌ Mark Ryan (QLP—Morayfield)
▌ Jess Pugh (QLP—Mount Ommaney)
▌ Ros Bates (LNP—Mudgeeraba)
▌ Steven Miles (QLP—Murrumba)
▌ Marty Hunt (LNP—Nicklin)
▌ Dan Purdie (LNP—Ninderry)
▌ Sandy Bolton (IND—Noosa)
▌ Leanne Linard (QLP—Nudgee)
▌ Amanda Stoker (LNP—Oodgeroo)
▌ Nikki Boyd (QLP—Pine Rivers)
▌ Ariana Doolan (LNP—Pumicestone)
▌ Kerri-Anne Dooley (LNP—Redcliffe)
▌ Rebecca Young (LNP—Redlands)
▌ Bisma Asif (QLP—Sandgate)
▌ Jon Krause (LNP—Scenic Rim)
▌ Barbara O'Shea (QLP—South Brisbane)
▌ Rob Molhoek (LNP—Southport)
▌ Mick de Brenni (QLP—Springwood)
▌ Jimmy Sullivan (IND—Stafford)
▌ James Martin (QLP—Stretton)
▌ John-Paul Langbroek (LNP—Surfers Paradise)
▌ Mark Boothman (LNP—Theodore)
▌ Peter Russo (QLP—Toohey)
▌ Shannon Fentiman (QLP—Waterford)
▌ Cameron Dick (QLP—Woodridge)

=== Central Queensland ===
▌ Glenn Butcher (QLP—Gladstone)
▌ Sean Dillon (LNP—Gregory)
▌ Nigel Hutton (LNP—Keppel)
▌ Donna Kirkland (LNP—Rockhampton)

=== Central Queensland–Mackay, Isaac and Whitsunday ===
▌ Glen Kelly (LNP—Mirani)

=== Darling Downs ===
▌ Pat Weir (LNP—Condamine)
▌ James Lister (LNP—Southern Downs)
▌ Trevor Watts (LNP—Toowoomba North)
▌ David Janetzki (LNP—Toowoomba South)
▌ Ann Leahy (LNP—Warrego)

=== Darling Downs–Wide Bay–Burnett–Central Queensland ===
▌ Bryson Head (LNP—Callide)

=== Far North Queensland ===
▌ Bree James (LNP—Barron River)
▌ Michael Healy (QLP—Cairns)
▌ David Kempton (LNP—Cook)
▌ Shane Knuth (KAP—Hill)
▌ Terry James (LNP—Mulgrave)

=== Far North Queensland–North Queensland ===
▌ Robbie Katter (KAP—Traeger)

=== Mackay, Isaac and Whitsunday ===
▌ Dale Last (LNP—Burdekin)
▌ Nigel Dalton (LNP—Mackay)
▌ Amanda Camm (LNP—Whitsunday)

=== North Queensland ===
▌ Wayde Chiesa (LNP—Hinchinbrook)
▌ Janelle Poole (LNP—Mundingburra)
▌ Natalie Marr (LNP—Thuringowa)
▌ Adam Baillie (LNP—Townsville)

=== Wide Bay–Burnett ===
▌ Tom Smith (QLP—Bundaberg)
▌ Tony Perrett (LNP—Gympie)
▌ David Lee (LNP—Hervey Bay)
▌ John Barounis (LNP—Maryborough)
▌ Deb Frecklington (LNP—Nanango)

=== Wide Bay–Burnett–Central Queensland ===
▌ Stephen Bennett (LNP—Burnett)

Map of winning margin by electorate.
