= Electoral results for the district of Capalaba =

Queensland, Australia, district election results

This is a list of electoral results for the electoral district of Capalaba in Queensland state elections.

== Members for Capalaba ==
Member	Party	Term
Jim Elder	Labor	1992–2000
Jim Elder	Independent	2000–2001
Michael Choi	Labor	2001–2012
Steve Davies	Liberal National	2012–2015
Don Brown	Labor	2015–2024
Russell Field	Liberal National	2024-present

== Election results ==
=== Elections in the 2020s ===
2024 Queensland state election: Capalaba
Party	Candidate	Votes	%	±%
Liberal National	Russell Field	14,665	44.39	+13.48
Labor	Don Brown	12,132	36.73	−11.48
Greens	Donna Weston	3,869	11.71	+3.76
One Nation	David Schmid	2,368	7.17	+1.98
Total formal votes		33,034	96.75	+0.56
Informal votes		1,109	3.25	−0.56
Turnout		34,143	90.82	+0.45
Two-party-preferred result
Liberal National	Russell Field	17,159	51.94	+11.75
Labor	Don Brown	15,875	48.06	−11.75
Liberal National gain from Labor		Swing	+11.75	

2020 Queensland state election: Capalaba
Party	Candidate	Votes	%	±%
Labor	Don Brown	15,160	48.21	+5.36
Liberal National	Bev Walters	9,719	30.91	+5.56
Greens	Michael Metzen	2,500	7.95	−0.49
Independent	Paul Branagan	1,655	5.26	+5.26
One Nation	Neal Gilmore	1,631	5.19	−14.31
Informed Medical Options	Marilyn Winters	530	1.69	+1.69
Civil Liberties & Motorists	Peter Callil	252	0.80	+0.80
Total formal votes		31,447	96.19	+0.51
Informal votes		1,246	3.81	−0.51
Turnout		32,693	90.37	+0.10
Two-party-preferred result
Labor	Don Brown	18,807	59.81	+1.95
Liberal National	Bev Walters	12,640	40.19	−1.95
Labor hold		Swing	+1.95	

=== Elections in the 2010s ===
2017 Queensland state election: Capalaba
Party	Candidate	Votes	%	±%
Labor	Don Brown	13,065	43.0	−4.4
Liberal National	Cameron Leafe	7,696	25.3	−14.8
One Nation	Paul Taylor	5,922	19.5	+19.5
Greens	Joshua Sanderson	2,563	8.4	−4.0
Independent	Jason Lavender	1,166	3.8	+3.8
Total formal votes		30,412	95.7	−1.7
Informal votes		1,360	4.3	+1.7
Turnout		31,772	88.5	−1.5
Two-party-preferred result
Labor	Don Brown	17,948	57.9	+1.4
Liberal National	Cameron Leafe	13,073	42.1	−1.4
Labor hold		Swing	+1.4	

2015 Queensland state election: Capalaba
Party	Candidate	Votes	%	±%
Labor	Don Brown	14,046	47.94	+9.57
Liberal National	Steve Davies	11,602	39.60	−6.94
Greens	Erin Payne	3,649	12.46	+4.89
Total formal votes		29,297	97.40	−0.09
Informal votes		782	2.60	+0.09
Turnout		30,079	91.80	−1.17
Two-party-preferred result
Labor	Don Brown	16,160	57.06	+10.79
Liberal National	Steve Davies	12,163	42.94	−10.79
Labor gain from Liberal National		Swing	+10.79	

2012 Queensland state election: Capalaba
Party	Candidate	Votes	%	±%
Liberal National	Steve Davies	13,345	46.54	+9.63
Labor	Michael Choi	11,004	38.37	−14.90
Greens	Penny Allman-Payne	2,168	7.56	−2.26
Katter's Australian	Graeme Moorhouse	1,708	5.96	+5.96
One Nation	David Chidgey	450	1.57	+1.57
Total formal votes		28,675	97.49	−0.45
Informal votes		738	2.51	+0.45
Turnout		29,413	92.97	+0.28
Two-party-preferred result
Liberal National	Steve Davies	14,144	53.73	+13.40
Labor	Michael Choi	12,182	46.27	−13.40
Liberal National gain from Labor		Swing	+13.40	

=== Elections in the 2000s ===
2009 Queensland state election: Capalaba
Party	Candidate	Votes	%	±%
Labor	Michael Choi	15,286	53.3	−4.2
Liberal National	Paul Gleeson	10,591	36.9	+6.5
Greens	Chad Kirby	2,817	9.8	−1.3
Total formal votes		28,694	97.8	
Informal votes		605	2.2	
Turnout		29,299	92.69	
Two-party-preferred result
Labor	Michael Choi	16,354	59.7	−5.1
Liberal National	Paul Gleeson	11,055	40.3	+5.1
Labor hold		Swing	−5.1	

2006 Queensland state election: Capalaba
Party	Candidate	Votes	%	±%
Labor	Michael Choi	14,447	59.1	−0.1
Liberal	Trish Symons	7,207	29.5	−1.3
Greens	Greg Thomas	2,775	11.4	+1.4
Total formal votes		24,429	97.6	+0.2
Informal votes		600	2.4	−0.2
Turnout		25,029	92.5	−1.1
Two-party-preferred result
Labor	Michael Choi	15,299	66.2	+1.0
Liberal	Trish Symons	7,821	33.8	−1.0
Labor hold		Swing	+1.0	

2004 Queensland state election: Capalaba
Party	Candidate	Votes	%	±%
Labor	Michael Choi	14,521	59.2	+15.6
Liberal	Phill Costello	7,553	30.8	+18.2
Greens	Bob Knowles	2,449	10.0	+10.0
Total formal votes		24,523	97.4	−0.1
Informal votes		650	2.6	+0.1
Turnout		25,173	93.6	−0.9
Two-party-preferred result
Labor	Michael Choi	15,172	65.2	+0.6
Liberal	Phill Costello	8,112	34.8	+34.8
Labor hold		Swing	+0.6	

2001 Queensland state election: Capalaba
Party	Candidate	Votes	%	±%
Labor	Michael Choi	10,577	43.6	−10.6
Independent	Murray Elliott	3,835	15.8	+15.8
Independent	Toni Bowler	3,403	14.0	+14.0
Liberal	Phill Costello	3,051	12.6	−14.7
One Nation	Mike O'Rourke	2,958	12.2	+9.8
Independent	Mary Brown	272	1.1	+1.1
Independent	Les Reimers	158	0.7	+0.7
Total formal votes		24,254	97.5	
Informal votes		633	2.5	
Turnout		24,887	94.5	
Two-candidate-preferred result
Labor	Michael Choi	11,650	64.6	+1.0
Independent	Toni Bowler	6,379	35.4	+35.4
Labor hold		Swing	+1.0	

=== Elections in the 1990s ===
1998 Queensland state election: Capalaba
Party	Candidate	Votes	%	±%
Labor	Jim Elder	11,398	54.9	−3.9
Liberal	Richard Ferrett	5,748	27.7	−13.6
Independent	David Exelby	2,412	11.6	+11.6
Greens	Julie-Anne O'Donohue	1,215	5.8	+5.8
Total formal votes		20,773	97.7	+0.0
Informal votes		496	2.3	−0.0
Turnout		21,269	93.9	+0.9
Two-party-preferred result
Labor	Jim Elder	12,341	63.7	+5.0
Liberal	Richard Ferrett	7,027	36.3	−5.0
Labor hold		Swing	+5.0	

1995 Queensland state election: Capalaba
Party	Candidate	Votes	%	±%
Labor	Jim Elder	11,377	58.7	−5.9
Liberal	Margaret Uhr	7,995	41.3	+5.9
Total formal votes		19,372	97.6	+0.4
Informal votes		468	2.4	−0.4
Turnout		19,840	93.0	
Labor hold		Swing	−5.9	

1992 Queensland state election: Capalaba
Party	Candidate	Votes	%	±%
Labor	Jim Elder	11,728	64.7	+7.5
Liberal	Bill Vaughan	6,408	35.3	+18.1
Total formal votes		18,136	97.2	
Informal votes		522	2.8	
Turnout		18,658	92.3	
Labor hold		Swing	+1.1	
