= Members of the Queensland Legislative Assembly, 2024–2028 =

Members of the Queensland Legislative Assembly, 2024–2028

This is a list of members of the 58th Legislative Assembly of Queensland from 2024 to 2028, as elected at the 2024 election held on 26 October 2024.

== Members ==
Electorate	Party	Member	Term
Algester	Labor	Leeanne Enoch	2015–present
Aspley	Labor	Bart Mellish	2017–present
Bancroft	Labor	Chris Whiting	2015–present
Barron River	LNP	Bree James	2024–present
Bonney	LNP	Sam O'Connor	2017–present
Broadwater	LNP	David Crisafulli	2012–2015, 2017–present
Buderim	LNP	Brent Mickelberg	2017–present
Bulimba	Labor	Di Farmer	2009–2012, 2015–present
Bundaberg	Labor	Tom Smith	2020–present
Bundamba	Labor	Lance McCallum	2020–present
Burdekin	LNP	Dale Last	2015–present
Burleigh	LNP	Hermann Vorster	2024–present
Burnett	LNP	Stephen Bennett	2012–present
Cairns	Labor	Michael Healy	2017–present
Callide	LNP	Bryson Head	2022–present
Caloundra	LNP	Kendall Morton	2024–present
Capalaba	LNP	Russell Field	2024–present
Chatsworth	LNP	Steve Minnikin	2012–present
Clayfield	LNP	Tim Nicholls	2006–present
Condamine	LNP	Pat Weir	2015–present
Cook	LNP	David Kempton	2024–present
Coomera	LNP	Michael Crandon	2009–present
Cooper	Labor	Jonty Bush	2020–present
Currumbin	LNP	Laura Gerber	2020–present
Everton	LNP	Tim Mander	2012–present
Ferny Grove	Labor	Mark Furner	2015–present
Gaven	Labor	Meaghan Scanlon	2017–present
Gladstone	Labor	Glenn Butcher	2015–present
Glass House	LNP	Andrew Powell	2009–present
Greenslopes	Labor	Joe Kelly	2015–present
Gregory	LNP	Sean Dillon	2024–present
Gympie	LNP	Tony Perrett	2015–present
Hervey Bay	LNP	David Lee	2024–present
Hill	Katter's Australian	Shane Knuth	2004–present
Hinchinbrook	Katter's Australian	Nick Dametto	2017–2025
Hinchinbrook	LNP	Wayde Chiesa	2025–present
Inala	Labor	Margie Nightingale	2024–present
Ipswich	Labor	Jennifer Howard	2015–present
Ipswich West	Labor	Wendy Bourne	2024–present
Jordan	Labor	Charis Mullen	2017–present
Kawana	LNP	Jarrod Bleijie	2009–present
Keppel	LNP	Nigel Hutton	2024–present
Kurwongbah	Labor	Shane King	2015–present
Lockyer	LNP	Jim McDonald	2017–present
Logan	Labor	Linus Power	2015–present
Lytton	Labor	Joan Pease	2015–present
Macalister	Labor	Melissa McMahon	2017–present
Mackay	LNP	Nigel Dalton	2024–present
Maiwar	Greens	Michael Berkman	2017–present
Mansfield	Labor	Corrine McMillan	2017–present
Maroochydore	LNP	Fiona Simpson	1992–present
Maryborough	LNP	John Barounis	2024–present
McConnel	Labor	Grace Grace	2007–2012, 2015–present
Mermaid Beach	LNP	Ray Stevens	2006–present
Miller	Labor	Mark Bailey	2015–present
Mirani	LNP	Glen Kelly	2015–present
Moggill	LNP	Christian Rowan	2015–present
Morayfield	Labor	Mark Ryan	2009–2012, 2015–present
Mount Ommaney	Labor	Jess Pugh	2017–present
Mudgeeraba	LNP	Ros Bates	2009–present
Mulgrave	LNP	Terry James	2024–present
Mundingburra	LNP	Janelle Poole	2024–present
Murrumba	Labor	Steven Miles	2015–present
Nanango	LNP	Deb Frecklington	2012–present
Nicklin	LNP	Marty Hunt	2017–2020, 2024–present
Ninderry	LNP	Dan Purdie	2017–present
Noosa	Independent	Sandy Bolton	2017–present
Nudgee	Labor	Leanne Linard	2015–present
Oodgeroo	LNP	Amanda Stoker	2024–present
Pine Rivers	Labor	Nikki Boyd	2015–present
Pumicestone	LNP	Ariana Doolan	2024–present
Redcliffe	LNP	Kerri-Anne Dooley	2024–present
Redlands	LNP	Rebecca Young	2024–present
Rockhampton	LNP	Donna Kirkland	2024–present
Sandgate	Labor	Bisma Asif	2024–present
Scenic Rim	LNP	Jon Krause	2012–present
South Brisbane	Labor	Barbara O'Shea	2024–present
Southern Downs	LNP	James Lister	2017–present
Southport	LNP	Rob Molhoek	2012–present
Springwood	Labor	Mick de Brenni	2015–present
Stafford	Independent	Jimmy Sullivan	2020–2026
Stafford	Labor	Luke Richmond	2026–present
Stretton	Labor	James Martin	2021–present
Surfers Paradise	LNP	John-Paul Langbroek	2004–present
Theodore	LNP	Mark Boothman	2012–present
Thuringowa	LNP	Natalie Marr	2024–present
Toohey	Labor	Peter Russo	2015–present
Toowoomba North	LNP	Trevor Watts	2012–present
Toowoomba South	LNP	David Janetzki	2016–present
Townsville	LNP	Adam Baillie	2024–present
Traeger	Katter's Australian	Robbie Katter	2017–present
Warrego	LNP	Ann Leahy	2015–present
Waterford	Labor	Shannon Fentiman	2015–present
Whitsunday	LNP	Amanda Camm	2020–present
Woodridge	Labor	Cameron Dick	2009–2012, 2015–present
