= Electoral results for the district of Noosa =

Queensland, Australia, district election results

This is a list of electoral results for the electoral district of Noosa in Queensland state elections.

== Members for Noosa ==
Member	Party	Term
Bruce Davidson	Liberal	1992–2001
Cate Molloy	Labor	2001–2006
Cate Molloy	Independent	2006–2006
Glen Elmes	Liberal	2006–2008
Glen Elmes	Liberal National	2008–2017
Sandy Bolton	Independent	2017–present

== Election results ==
=== Elections in the 2020s ===
2024 Queensland state election: Noosa
Party	Candidate	Votes	%	±%
Independent	Sandy Bolton	14,237	43.22	−0.68
Liberal National	Clare Stewart	11,843	35.96	+6.76
Labor	Mark Denham	3,066	9.31	−5.09
Greens	Rhonda Prescott	1,865	5.66	−1.54
One Nation	Darrel Hinson	1,550	4.71	+1.11
Family First	Felicity Roser	377	1.14	+1.14
Total formal votes		32,938	96.68	
Informal votes		1,131	3.32	
Turnout		34,069	88.34	
Two-candidate-preferred result
Independent	Sandy Bolton	19,283	58.54	−7.26
Liberal National	Clare Stewart	13,655	41.46	+7.26
Independent hold		Swing	−7.26	

2020 Queensland state election: Noosa
Party	Candidate	Votes	%	±%
Independent	Sandy Bolton	14,051	43.92	+12.53
Liberal National	James Blevin	9,344	29.21	−0.24
Labor	Mark Denham	4,607	14.40	+1.59
Greens	Rhonda Prescott	2,300	7.19	−4.38
One Nation	Tracey Bell-Henselin	1,147	3.59	−8.18
Animal Justice	Darrell Redford	541	1.69	+1.69
Total formal votes		31,990	97.45	+1.18
Informal votes		837	2.55	−1.18
Turnout		32,827	89.21	+1.50
Notional two-party-preferred count (Note: Estimate two-party preferred count by Antony Green.)
Liberal National	James Blevin		51.60	
Labor	Mark Denham		48.40	
Two-candidate-preferred result
Independent	Sandy Bolton	21,065	65.85	+4.32
Liberal National	James Blevin	10,925	34.15	−4.32
Independent hold		Swing	+4.32	

=== Elections in the 2010s ===
2017 Queensland state election: Noosa
Party	Candidate	Votes	%	±%
Independent	Sandy Bolton	9,479	31.4	+31.4
Liberal National	Glen Elmes	8,892	29.4	−16.5
Labor	Mark Denham	3,869	12.8	−8.5
One Nation	Eve-Marie Whiteside	3,551	11.8	+11.8
Greens	Phillip Jenkins	3,492	11.6	−10.2
Independent	Aaron White	610	2.0	+2.0
Independent	Robin Bristow	301	1.0	+1.0
Total formal votes		30,194	96.3	−1.5
Informal votes		1,171	3.7	+1.5
Turnout		31,365	87.7	+0.8
Two-candidate-preferred result
Independent	Sandy Bolton	18,578	61.5	+61.5
Liberal National	Glen Elmes	11,616	38.5	−18.1
Independent gain from Liberal National		Swing	+18.1	

2015 Queensland state election: Noosa
Party	Candidate	Votes	%	±%
Liberal National	Glen Elmes	15,455	48.64	−11.95
Greens	Joe Shlegeris	6,789	21.37	+5.86
Labor	Mark Denham	6,506	20.48	+8.04
Palmer United	Ian Woods	3,023	9.51	+9.51
Total formal votes		31,773	97.90	−0.09
Informal votes		681	2.10	+0.09
Turnout		32,454	90.47	+0.97
Two-candidate-preferred result
Liberal National	Glen Elmes	16,513	58.62	−16.84
Greens	Joe Shlegeris	11,657	41.38	+16.84
Liberal National hold		Swing	−16.84	

2012 Queensland state election: Noosa
Party	Candidate	Votes	%	±%
Liberal National	Glen Elmes	17,121	60.59	+4.45
Greens	Jim McDonald	4,382	15.51	+2.25
Labor	Kurt Hopkins	3,514	12.44	−8.13
Katter's Australian	Bob Jarvis	2,548	9.02	+9.02
Family First	Gemika Maloney	376	1.33	−0.57
Independent	Bill Colley	316	1.12	+1.12
Total formal votes		28,257	97.99	−0.43
Informal votes		580	2.01	+0.43
Turnout		28,837	89.50	−0.26
Two-candidate-preferred result
Liberal National	Glen Elmes	18,116	75.46	+5.61
Greens	Jim McDonald	5,893	24.54	+24.54
Liberal National hold		Swing	+5.61	

=== Elections in the 2000s ===
2009 Queensland state election: Noosa
Party	Candidate	Votes	%	±%
Liberal National	Glen Elmes	15,129	56.1	+16.5
Labor	Brian Stockwell	5,543	20.6	−2.1
Greens	Steve Haines	3,573	13.3	+4.3
Independent	Cate Molloy	2,192	8.1	−15.6
Family First	John Chapman	513	1.9	−2.1
Total formal votes		26,950	98.2	
Informal votes		432	1.8	
Turnout		27,382	89.8	
Two-party-preferred result
Liberal National	Glen Elmes	16,618	69.8	+12.4
Labor	Brian Stockwell	7,174	30.2	−12.4
Liberal National hold		Swing	+12.4	

2006 Queensland state election: Noosa
Party	Candidate	Votes	%	±%
Liberal	Glen Elmes	11,122	38.2	+3.0
Labor	John O'Connor	6,922	23.8	−24.6
Independent	Cate Molloy	6,819	23.4	+23.4
Greens	Jennie Harvie	2,771	9.5	−0.7
Family First	John Chapman	1,191	4.1	+4.1
Independent	John Rivett	262	0.9	+0.9
Total formal votes		29,087	98.2	−0.3
Informal votes		537	1.8	+0.3
Turnout		29,624	89.1	−1.3
Two-candidate-preferred result
Liberal	Glen Elmes	12,324	56.3	+15.0
Independent	Cate Molloy	9,557	43.7	+43.7
Liberal gain from Independent		Swing	+15.0	

2004 Queensland state election: Noosa
Party	Candidate	Votes	%	±%
Labor	Cate Molloy	13,702	48.4	+6.4
Liberal	Glen Elmes	9,969	35.2	−5.1
Greens	Jennie Harvie	2,893	10.2	+10.2
One Nation	Ernest Lake	1,718	6.1	−11.5
Total formal votes		28,282	98.5	+0.4
Informal votes		438	1.5	−0.4
Turnout		28,720	90.4	−0.9
Two-party-preferred result
Labor	Cate Molloy	15,329	58.7	+7.8
Liberal	Glen Elmes	10,802	41.3	−7.8
Labor hold		Swing	+7.8	

2001 Queensland state election: Noosa
Party	Candidate	Votes	%	±%
Labor	Cate Molloy	10,828	42.0	+12.3
Liberal	Bruce Davidson	10,391	40.3	−5.5
One Nation	Ernie Lake	4,543	17.6	+3.9
Total formal votes		25,762	98.1	
Informal votes		486	1.9	
Turnout		26,248	91.3	
Two-party-preferred result
Labor	Cate Molloy	11,977	50.9	+11.3
Liberal	Bruce Davidson	11,552	49.1	−11.3
Labor gain from Liberal		Swing	+11.3	

=== Elections in the 1990s ===
1998 Queensland state election: Noosa
Party	Candidate	Votes	%	±%
Liberal	Bruce Davidson	11,932	45.3	−12.8
Labor	Don Sfiligoj	7,871	29.9	−7.3
One Nation	David Summers	3,767	14.3	+14.3
Greens	Peter Sykes	1,618	6.1	+6.1
Christian Democrats	Eddie Taylor	833	3.2	+3.2
Independent	Robert Logan	258	1.0	+1.0
Independent	John Jones	70	0.3	+0.3
Total formal votes		26,349	98.1	−0.4
Informal votes		510	1.9	+0.4
Turnout		26,859	90.7	+0.4
Two-party-preferred result
Liberal	Bruce Davidson	14,291	59.9	−1.4
Labor	Don Sfiligoj	9,585	40.1	+1.4
Liberal hold		Swing	−1.4	

1995 Queensland state election: Noosa
Party	Candidate	Votes	%	±%
Liberal	Bruce Davidson	13,230	58.0	+19.0
Labor	Ross Macleod	8,476	37.2	−9.0
Independent	Ian McNiven	1,085	4.8	+4.8
Total formal votes		22,791	98.5	+0.3
Informal votes		352	1.5	−0.3
Turnout		23,143	90.3	
Two-party-preferred result
Liberal	Bruce Davidson	13,819	61.2	+8.8
Labor	Ross Macleod	8,753	38.8	−8.8
Liberal hold		Swing	+8.8	

1992 Queensland state election: Noosa
Party	Candidate	Votes	%	±%
Labor	Ray Barber	8,896	46.2	−3.4
Liberal	Bruce Davidson	7,509	39.0	+15.6
National	Barbara Luff	2,848	14.8	−6.0
Total formal votes		19,253	98.2	
Informal votes		360	1.8	
Turnout		19,613	89.6	
Two-party-preferred result
Liberal	Bruce Davidson	9,984	52.5	+4.9
Labor	Ray Barber	9,047	47.5	−4.9
Liberal gain from Labor		Swing	+4.9	
