= 2028 Queensland state election =

- 28 October 2028

All 93 seats in the Legislative Assembly 47 seats needed for a majority
- Opinion polls
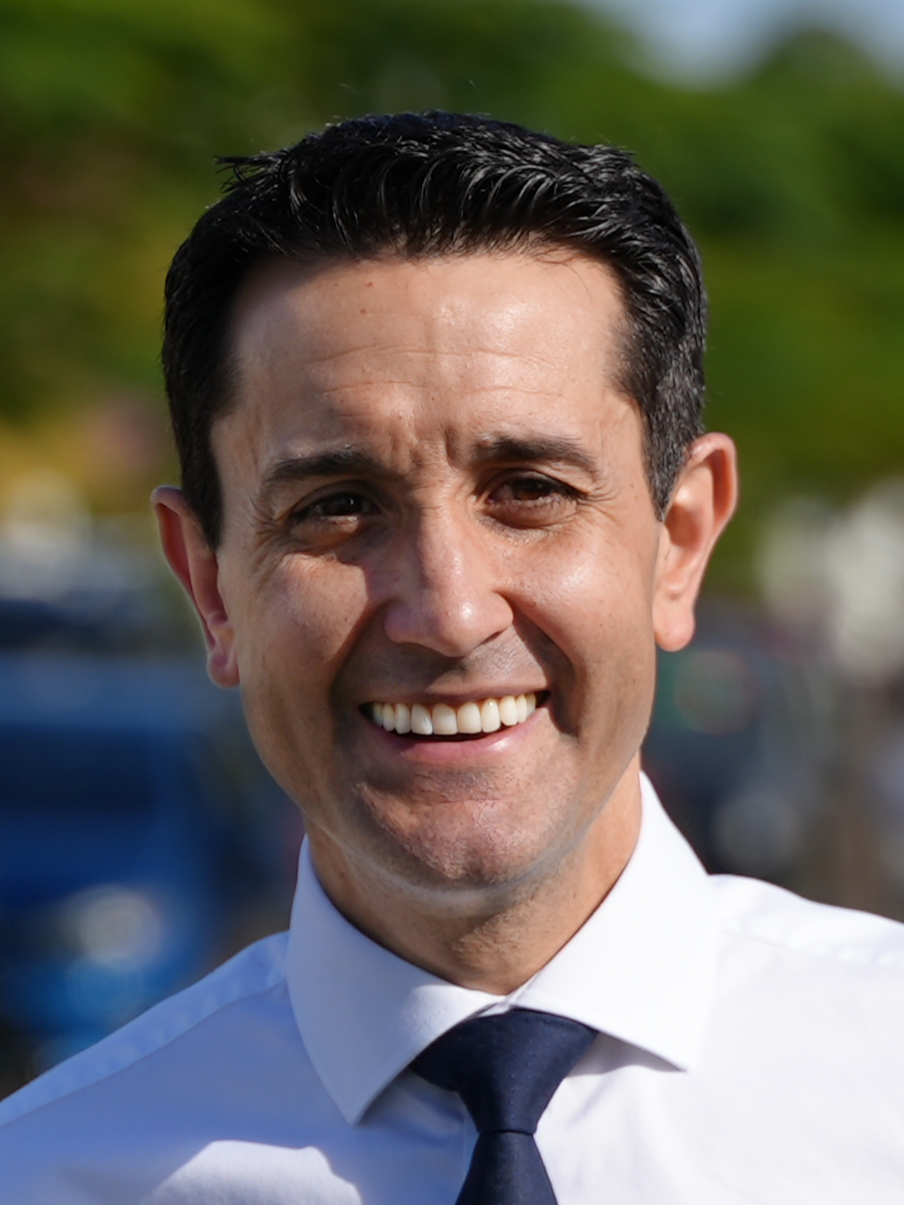

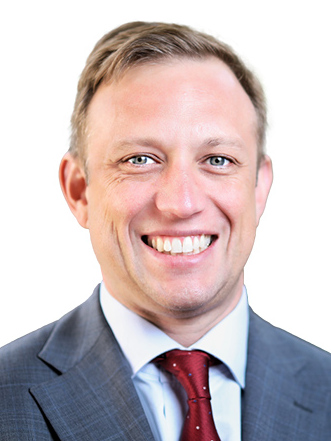

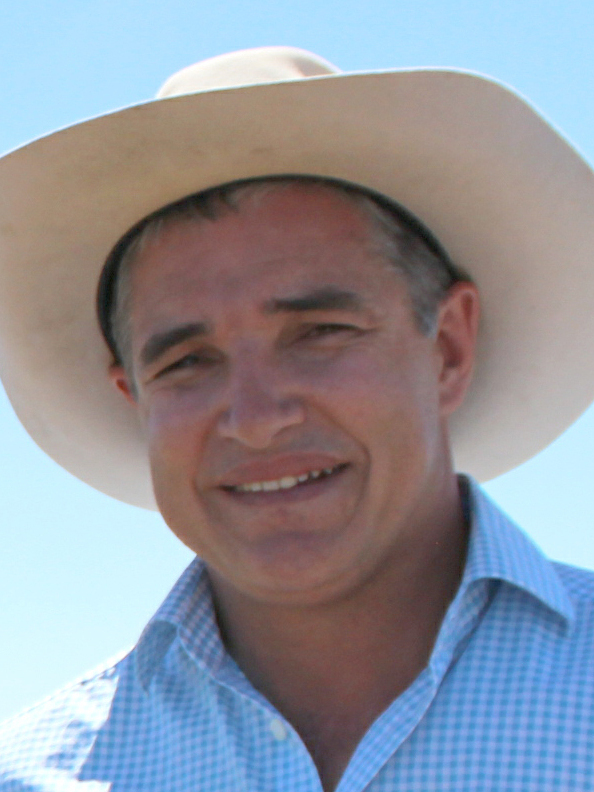

Leader	David Crisafulli	Steven Miles
Party	Liberal National	Labor
Leader since	12 November 2020	15 December 2023
Leader's seat	Broadwater	Murrumba
Last election	52 seats, 41.52%	36 seats, 32.56%
Current seats	53 (Note: The Liberal National Party gained the seat of Hinchinbrook from Katter's Australian Party in a by-election in 2025.)	36
Seats needed	Steady	▲11
Leader	Robbie Katter	No leader
Party	Katter's Australian	Greens
Leader since	2 February 2015
Leader's seat	Traeger
Last election	3 seats, 2.44%	1 seat, 9.89%
Current seats	2	1
Seats needed	▲45	▲46
Incumbent Premier
David Crisafulli
Liberal National

The 2028 Queensland state election will be held on or before 28 October 2028 to elect the 59th Parliament of Queensland and its 93 seats. The Electoral Commission of Queensland (ECQ) will conduct the election.

The incumbent Liberal National majority government, led by Premier David Crisafulli, will seek a second four-year term in government. They will be challenged by the Queensland Labor Party, led by Leader of the Opposition and former Premier Steven Miles. It is expected that the Queensland Greens, Pauline Hanson's One Nation, Katter's Australian Party, and other minor parties and independents will contest the election.

Queensland has compulsory voting, with preferential instant runoff voting in single-member seats. However, premier David Crisafulli has pledged to reinstate optional preferential voting after Labor reinstated full compulsory preferential voting in 2016, returning the system to the recommendations from the Fitzgerald Inquiry.

== Background ==
At the 2024 Queensland state election, the Liberal National Party of Queensland (LNP), led by David Crisafulli, ended nine years in Opposition by securing a decisive victory. The LNP won 52 seats, compared to Labor's 36. The Greens, who previously held two seats, lost South Brisbane but managed to retain Maiwar. Katter's Australian Party (KAP), led by Robbie Katter, held onto its three seats, while Pauline Hanson's One Nation lost Mirani following the defection of Stephen Andrew to the KAP. Andrew, however, was defeated by the LNP in Mirani during the election.

The KAP lost a further seat in 2025, in a by-election for the seat of Hinchinbrook, following the resignation of Nick Dametto in order to contest the 2025 Townsville mayoral by-election, which he won. It is the first time a sitting Queensland government has gained a seat in a by-election since Mulgrave in 1998.

== Candidates ==
The following individuals have publicly indicated an intention to contest the 2028 Queensland state election.

Electorate	Candidate	Party	Notes
Brisbane Central	Nora Fraser	Independent	Announced candidacy.
Gaven	Meaghan Scanlon	Labor	Confirmed intention to recontest the seat at the 2028 state election.

== Date ==
The parliament has fixed four-year terms with the election held on the fourth Saturday in October, though the Governor may dissolve the house sooner on the advice of the Premier. Additionally, Section 19B, Paragraph 3 of the Constitution of Queensland 2001 states that “The Governor may at any time, by proclamation, order the polling day for an ordinary general election to be postponed to a Saturday not more than 35 days after the normal polling day (the postponed polling day)" if there are exceptional circumstances and if both the premier, and the Leader of the Opposition agrees to its postponement. Examples of exceptional circumstances listed in the constitution includes "An election for members of the House of Representatives or the Senate of the Commonwealth Parliament is to be held on the normal polling day or "A natural disaster has affected such a wide area of the State that the conduct of an election on the normal polling day would be impracticable.

== See also ==
- Members of the Queensland Legislative Assembly, 2024–2028
- Premiership of David Crisafulli
