= Opinion polling for the 2028 Queensland state election =

In the lead-up to the 2028 Queensland state election, a number of polling companies have conducted opinion polls. These polls collect data on parties' primary vote, leaders' favourability, and individual electoral district results.

== Voting intention ==
| Date | Polling firm | Client | Sample size | Primary vote | | | | | | | 2PP vote | |
| Date | Polling firm | Client | Sample size | LNP | ALP | GRN | ONP | KAP | IND | Others | LNP | ALP |
|---|---|---|---|---|---|---|---|---|---|---|---|---|
| 14–21 Oct 2026 | DemosAU/Premier National | —N/a | 1,200 | 34% | 25% | 11% | 23% | 1% | —N/a | 6% | 57% | 43% |
| Sep – Oct 2026 | Resolve | Brisbane Times | 868 | 32% | 24% | 11% | 21% | 0% | 7% | 4% | —N/a | —N/a |
| 22 Aug – 2 Sep 2026 | DemosAU/Premier National | —N/a | 1,291 | 34% | 26% | 11% | 21% | 1% | —N/a | 7% | 56% | 44% |
| Jul – Aug 2026 | Resolve (Note: Two-party preferred result estimated by Kevin Bonham.) | Brisbane Times | 681 | 34% | 25% | 10% | 20% | 1% | 6% | 4% | 55.2% | 44.8% |
| May – Jun 2026 | Resolve | Brisbane Times | 868 | 30% | 24% | 10% | 24% | 0% | 5% | 6% | 56% | 44% |
| 27 May – 3 Jun 2026 | DemosAU/Premier National | —N/a | 1,033 | 34% | 25% | 10% | 24% | —N/a | —N/a | 7% | 58% | 42% |
| 16 May 2026 | The ALP wins the Stafford by-election | | | | | | | | | | | |
| Mar – Apr 2026 | Resolve | Brisbane Times | 870 | 30% | 28% | 11% | 17% | 2% | 10% | 4% | —N/a | —N/a |
| 10–20 Feb 2026 | DemosAU/Premier National | —N/a | 1,044 | 34% | 28% | 10% | 21% | —N/a | —N/a | 7% | 56% | 44% |
| Jan – Feb 2026 | Resolve | Brisbane Times | 868 | 34% | 26% | 10% | 16% | 1% | 9% | 4% | 54.6% | 45.4% |
| 24 Nov – 8 Dec 2025 | RedBridge/Accent | Australian Financial Review | 818 | 40% | 27% | 12% | 16% | —N/a | —N/a | 5% | 56% | 44% |
| Nov – Dec 2025 | Resolve | Brisbane Times | 803 | 33% | 30% | 11% | 9% | 2% | 8% | 8% | 51.1% | 48.9% |
| 29 Nov 2025 | The LNP defeats the KAP in the Hinchinbrook by-election | | | | | | | | | | | |
| 13–20 Oct 2025 | DemosAU/Premier National | —N/a | 1,006 | 37% | 29% | 12% | 14% | —N/a | —N/a | 8% | 54% | 46% |
| Sep – Oct 2025 | Resolve | Brisbane Times | 868 | 33% | 32% | 10% | 9% | 1% | 7% | 7% | 49.3% | 50.7% |
| Jul – Aug 2025 | Resolve | Brisbane Times | 869 | 34% | 32% | 10% | 8% | 1% | 8% | 6% | 49.5% | 50.5% |
| 4–9 Jul 2025 | DemosAU/Premier National | —N/a | 1,027 | 40% | 28% | 13% | 12% | —N/a | —N/a | 7% | 55% | 45% |
| 17–25 Mar 2025 | RedBridge/Accent | Australian Financial Review | 1,507 | 44% | 27% | 12% | 10% | —N/a | —N/a | 7% | 56.5% | 43.5% |
| Jan – Apr 2025 | Resolve | Brisbane Times | 934 | 45% | 22% | 12% | 8% | 1% | 7% | 5% | 60% | 40% |
| 10–14 Feb 2025 | DemosAU/Premier National | —N/a | 1,004 | 40% | 30% | 12% | 10% | —N/a | —N/a | 8% | 56% | 44% |
| 26 Oct 2024 | 2024 election | | | 41.5% | 32.6% | 9.9% | 8.0% | 2.4% | 1.7% | 3.9% | 53.8% | 46.2% |

=== By language ===
==== Only English spoken at home ====
| Date | Polling firm | Client | Sample size | Primary vote | | | | | | |
| Date | Polling firm | Client | Sample size | LNP | ALP | GRN | ONP | KAP | IND | Others |
|---|---|---|---|---|---|---|---|---|---|---|
| 27 May – 3 Jun 2026 | DemosAU/Premier National | —N/a | —N/a | 36% | 22% | 10% | 25% | —N/a | —N/a | 10% |

==== Other language spoken at home ====
| Date | Polling firm | Client | Sample size | Primary vote | | | | | | |
| Date | Polling firm | Client | Sample size | LNP | ALP | GRN | ONP | KAP | IND | Others |
|---|---|---|---|---|---|---|---|---|---|---|
| 27 May – 3 Jun 2026 | DemosAU/Premier National | —N/a | —N/a | 19% | 45% | 12% | 21% | —N/a | —N/a | 3% |

== Approval polling ==
=== Preferred premier ===
| Date | Polling firm | Client | Sample size | Party leaders | | | Net |
| Date | Polling firm | Client | Sample size | Crisafulli | Miles | Don't know | Net |
|---|---|---|---|---|---|---|---|
| 14–21 Oct 2026 | DemosAU/Premier National | —N/a | 1,200 | 46% | 32% | 22% | +14 |
| Sep – Oct 2026 | Resolve | Brisbane Times | 868 | 41% | 24% | 36% | +17 |
| 22 Aug – 2 Sep 2026 | DemosAU/Premier National | —N/a | 1,291 | 45% | 33% | 22% | +12 |
| Jul – Aug 2026 | Resolve | Brisbane Times | 681 | 41% | 22% | 37% | +19 |
| May – Jun 2026 | Resolve | Brisbane Times | 868 | 44% | 20% | 36% | +24 |
| 27 May – 3 Jun 2026 | DemosAU/Premier National | —N/a | 1,033 | 47% | 30% | 23% | +17 |
| Mar – Apr 2026 | Resolve | Brisbane Times | 870 | 42% | 26% | 32% | +16 |
| 10–20 Feb 2026 | DemosAU/Premier National | —N/a | 1,044 | 43% | 32% | 25% | +11 |
| Jan – Feb 2026 | Resolve | Brisbane Times | 868 | 44% | 23% | 33% | +21 |
| Nov – Dec 2025 | Resolve | Brisbane Times | 803 | 35% | 34% | 31% | +1 |
| 13–20 Oct 2025 | DemosAU/Premier National | —N/a | 1,006 | 44% | 32% | 24% | +12 |
| Sep – Oct 2025 | Resolve | Brisbane Times | 868 | 39% | 22% | 39% | +17 |
| Jul – Aug 2025 | Resolve | Brisbane Times | 869 | 40% | 25% | 35% | +15 |
| Jan – Apr 2025 | Resolve | Brisbane Times | 934 | 44% | 22% | 34% | +22 |

=== Satisfaction ratings ===
| Date | Polling firm | Client | Sample size | Crisafulli | | | | Miles | | | |
| Date | Polling firm | Client | Sample size | Pos. | Neg. | DK | Net | Pos. | Neg. | DK | Net |
|---|---|---|---|---|---|---|---|---|---|---|---|
| 14–21 Oct 2026 | DemosAU/Premier National | —N/a | 1,200 | 41% | 22% | 37% | +19% | 26% | 37% | 37% | –11% |
| September – October 2026 | Resolve | Brisbane Times | 434 | 49% | 26% | 25% | +23% | 30% | 44% | 25% | –14% |
| 22 Aug – 2 Sep 2026 | DemosAU/Premier National | —N/a | 1,291 | 42% | 24% | 34% | +18% | 30% | 35% | 35% | –5% |
| July – August 2026 | Resolve | Brisbane Times | 681 | —N/a | —N/a | —N/a | +16% | —N/a | —N/a | —N/a | –6% |
| May – June 2026 | Resolve | Brisbane Times | 868 | —N/a | —N/a | —N/a | +16% | —N/a | —N/a | —N/a | –11% |
| Mar – Apr 2026 | Resolve | Brisbane Times | 870 | —N/a | —N/a | —N/a | +19% | —N/a | —N/a | —N/a | –5% |
| 10–20 Feb 2026 | DemosAU/Premier National | —N/a | 1,044 | 39% | 23% | 38% | +16% | 27% | 37% | 36% | –10% |
| 24 Nov – 8 Dec 2025 | RedBridge/Accent | Australian Financial Review | 818 | 54% | 30% | 16% | +24% | 28% | 54% | 18% | –26% |
| Nov – Dec 2025 | Resolve | Brisbane Times | 803 | —N/a | —N/a | —N/a | +16% | —N/a | —N/a | —N/a | +5% |
| Sep – Oct 2025 | Resolve | Brisbane Times | 868 | —N/a | —N/a | —N/a | +17% | —N/a | —N/a | —N/a | –2% |
| Jul – Aug 2025 | Resolve | Brisbane Times | 869 | —N/a | —N/a | —N/a | +20% | —N/a | —N/a | —N/a | –1% |
| 17–25 Mar 2025 | RedBridge/Accent | Australian Financial Review | 1,507 | 46% | 17% | 37% | +29% | 22% | 41% | 37% | –19% |

== Sub-state results ==
=== Inner Brisbane ===
| Date | Polling firm | Client | Sample size | Primary vote | | | | | | | 2PP vote | |
| Date | Polling firm | Client | Sample size | LNP | ALP | GRN | ONP | KAP | IND | Others | LNP | ALP |
|---|---|---|---|---|---|---|---|---|---|---|---|---|
| 24 Nov – 8 Dec 2025 | RedBridge/Accent | Australian Financial Review | —N/a | 31% | 42% | 16% | 8% | —N/a | —N/a | 3% | 41% | 59% |
| Oct 2025 | RedBridge/Accent | Australian Financial Review | —N/a | 38% | 34% | 14% | —N/a | —N/a | —N/a | 14% | 46% | 54% |

=== Brisbane ===
| Date | Polling firm | Client | Sample size | Primary vote | | | | | | | 2PP vote | |
| Date | Polling firm | Client | Sample size | LNP | ALP | GRN | ONP | KAP | IND | Others | LNP | ALP |
|---|---|---|---|---|---|---|---|---|---|---|---|---|
| 14–21 Oct 2026 | DemosAU/Premier National | —N/a | 1,200 | —N/a | —N/a | —N/a | —N/a | —N/a | —N/a | —N/a | 46% | 54% |
| 22 Aug – 2 Sep 2026 | DemosAU/Premier National | —N/a | —N/a | 30% | 37% | 15% | 16% | —N/a | —N/a | 2% | —N/a | —N/a |
| 27 May – 3 Jun 2026 | DemosAU/Premier National | —N/a | —N/a | 38% | 29% | 16% | 14% | —N/a | —N/a | 3% | —N/a | —N/a |
| 10 – 20 Feb 2026 | DemosAU/Premier National | —N/a | —N/a | 37% | 34% | 15% | 12% | —N/a | —N/a | 2% | 50% | 50% |
| 13–20 Oct 2025 | DemosAU/Premier National | —N/a | —N/a | 35% | 36% | 20% | 5% | —N/a | —N/a | 4% | 45% | 55% |

=== Outer Brisbane ===
| Date | Polling firm | Client | Sample size | Primary vote | | | | | | | 2PP vote | |
| Date | Polling firm | Client | Sample size | LNP | ALP | GRN | ONP | KAP | IND | Others | LNP | ALP |
|---|---|---|---|---|---|---|---|---|---|---|---|---|
| 24 Nov – 8 Dec 2025 | RedBridge/Accent | Australian Financial Review | —N/a | 37% | 29% | 14% | 16% | —N/a | —N/a | 4% | 53% | 47% |

=== South East Queensland ===
| Date | Polling firm | Client | Sample size | Primary vote | | | | | | | 2PP vote | |
| Date | Polling firm | Client | Sample size | LNP | ALP | GRN | ONP | KAP | IND | Others | LNP | ALP |
|---|---|---|---|---|---|---|---|---|---|---|---|---|
| 14–21 Oct 2026 | DemosAU/Premier National | —N/a | 1,200 | —N/a | —N/a | —N/a | —N/a | —N/a | —N/a | —N/a | 55% | 45% |
| 22 Aug – 2 Sep 2026 | DemosAU/Premier National | —N/a | —N/a | 37% | 27% | 12% | 18% | —N/a | —N/a | 6% | —N/a | —N/a |
| 27 May – 3 Jun 2026 | DemosAU/Premier National | —N/a | —N/a | 34% | 26% | 11% | 23% | —N/a | —N/a | 6% | —N/a | —N/a |
| 10 – 20 Feb 2026 | DemosAU/Premier National | —N/a | —N/a | 34% | 28% | 11% | 19% | —N/a | —N/a | 8% | 55% | 45% |
| 13–20 Oct 2025 | DemosAU/Premier National | —N/a | —N/a | 39% | 29% | 11% | 13% | —N/a | —N/a | 8% | 55% | 45% |
| Oct 2025 | RedBridge/Accent | Australian Financial Review | 1,013 | 36% | 35% | 13% | 11% | —N/a | —N/a | 5% | 48% | 52% |
| 26 Oct 2024 | 2024 election | | | 40.4% | 35.9% | 12.1% | 6.1% | — | — | 5.5% | 50.3% | 49.7% |

=== Provincial cities ===
| Date | Polling firm | Client | Sample size | Primary vote | | | | | | | 2PP vote | |
| Date | Polling firm | Client | Sample size | LNP | ALP | GRN | ONP | KAP | IND | Others | LNP | ALP |
|---|---|---|---|---|---|---|---|---|---|---|---|---|
| 24 Nov – 8 Dec 2025 | RedBridge/Accent | Australian Financial Review | —N/a | 44% | 24% | 8% | 19% | —N/a | —N/a | 5% | 61% | 39% |

=== Regional Queensland ===
| Date | Polling firm | Client | Sample size | Primary vote | | | | | | | 2PP vote | |
| Date | Polling firm | Client | Sample size | LNP | ALP | GRN | ONP | KAP | IND | Others | LNP | ALP |
|---|---|---|---|---|---|---|---|---|---|---|---|---|
| 14–21 Oct 2026 | DemosAU/Premier National | —N/a | 1,200 | —N/a | —N/a | —N/a | —N/a | —N/a | —N/a | —N/a | 65% | 35% |
| 22 Aug – 2 Sep 2026 | DemosAU/Premier National | —N/a | —N/a | 32% | 18% | 7% | 29% | 3% | —N/a | 11% | —N/a | —N/a |
| 27 May – 3 Jun 2026 | DemosAU/Premier National | —N/a | —N/a | 34% | 21% | 4% | 32% | —N/a | —N/a | 9% | —N/a | —N/a |
| 10 – 20 Feb 2026 | DemosAU/Premier National | —N/a | —N/a | 33% | 24% | 6% | 29% | —N/a | —N/a | 8% | 60% | 40% |
| 13–20 Oct 2025 | DemosAU/Premier National | —N/a | —N/a | 38% | 25% | 7% | 21% | —N/a | —N/a | 9% | 60% | 40% |

=== Rural communities ===
| Date | Polling firm | Client | Sample size | Primary vote | | | | | | | 2PP vote | |
| Date | Polling firm | Client | Sample size | LNP | ALP | GRN | ONP | KAP | IND | Others | LNP | ALP |
|---|---|---|---|---|---|---|---|---|---|---|---|---|
| 24 Nov – 8 Dec 2025 | RedBridge/Accent | Australian Financial Review | —N/a | 44% | 23% | 10% | 16% | —N/a | —N/a | 7% | 61% | 39% |
