= Penny Allman-Payne =

Australian politician

Senator Penny Allman-Payne
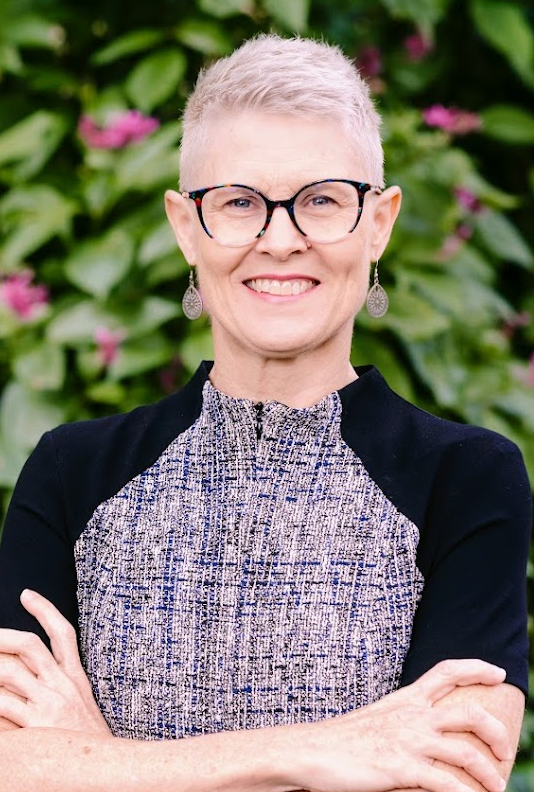
- Senator Allman-Payne 2023

Senator for Queensland
- Incumbent
- Assumed office 1 July 2022
- Preceded by: Amanda Stoker

Personal details
- Born: 19 March 1970 (age 56) Brisbane, Queensland, Australia
- Citizenship: Australian
- Party: Greens (since 2010)
- Profession: Lawyer; Schoolteacher
- Website: greens.org.au/qld/person/penny-allman-payne

Penelope Jane Allman-Payne (born 19 March 1970) is an Australian politician. She is a member of the Australian Greens and was elected to the Senate at the 2022 federal election. She worked as a schoolteacher and lawyer before entering politics.

== Early life ==
Allman-Payne is a qualified lawyer and practised in insurance law in a brief break from teaching. She worked as a secondary school teacher for over 25 years before being elected to parliament, and was an active member in the Queensland Teachers' Union.

== Politics ==
Allman-Payne joined the Greens in 2010. She ran as the party's candidate for the Capalaba seat in the state election in 2012, losing to the LNP's Steve Davies. In the 2013 federal election she lost to Andrew Laming in the race for the federal seat of Bowman.

Allman-Payne served extensively in Convenor positions within the party between 2014 and 2021. These included Co-Convenor of the Australian Greens (2014–16), Convenor for and then of the Queensland Greens (2015–16, 2018, 2021–22), and Convenor of the Asia-Pacific Greens Federation (2017–18).

Allman-Payne was elected to the Senate at the 2022 federal election.

== Portfolio positions ==
Allman-Payne is the Australian Greens spokesperson for these portfolios:

• Education: Primary & Secondary • Older People • Social Services • Government Services • Transition, Regional Development & Northern Australia • Sport

== Personal life ==
Allman-Payne is married and has two children, and has lived in Gladstone since 2018.
