= List of acts of the Parliament of Queensland =

This is an incomplete list of acts of the Parliament of Queensland.

== 19th century ==
=== 1860-1869 ===
- List of acts of the Parliament of Queensland from 1860
- List of acts of the Parliament of Queensland from 1861
- List of acts of the Parliament of Queensland from 1862
- List of acts of the Parliament of Queensland from 1863
- List of acts of the Parliament of Queensland from 1864
- List of acts of the Parliament of Queensland from 1865
- List of acts of the Parliament of Queensland from 1866
- List of acts of the Parliament of Queensland from 1867
- List of acts of the Parliament of Queensland from 1868
- List of acts of the Parliament of Queensland from 1869

== See also ==
- Parliament of Queensland
