= Lunatics (TV series) =

2019 Australian comedy mockumentary web television series

- Genre: Comedy; Sitcom; mockumentary
- Created by: Chris Lilley
- Written by: Chris Lilley
- Directed by: Chris Lilley
- Starring: Chris Lilley
- Theme music composer: Chris Lilley
- Composer: Chris Lilley
- Countries of origin: Australia; United States
- Original language: English
- No. of seasons: 1
- No. of episodes: 10

Production
- Executive producers: Chris Lilley; Laura Waters
- Producers: Chris Lilley; Laura Waters
- Production locations: Gold Coast, Australia; Woolmers Estate; Murwillumbah; Evandale, Tasmania
- Cinematography: Brigham Edgar
- Editors: Hayley Dinnison; Nick McDougall
- Camera setup: Single-camera
- Running time: 33–38 minutes
- Production companies: Princess Pictures (uncredited); Screen Queensland; Fulcrum Media Finance

Original release
- Network: Netflix
- Release: 19 April 2019

Related
- Jonah from Tonga; Angry Boys

Lunatics is an Australian mockumentary comedy television series that premiered on Netflix on 19 April 2019. The ten-part series, written by and starring Chris Lilley, continues the mockumentary style of his previous series.

== Synopsis ==
Lunatics is a mockumentary series that explores the lives and narrative of six different characters, all played by Lilley. Each character has his or her own eccentricity in terms of lifestyle and behaviour. The characters include fashion retailer Keith Dick; estate agent Quentin Cook; 7-foot college student Becky Douglas; 12-year old Gavin McGregor, who is an heir to an earldom; ex-pornstar Joyce Jeffries; and South African Jana Melhoopen-Jonks, a celebrity pet psychic who is also a lesbian.

A review notes that Lunatics follows Lilley's previous series, Summer Heights High, but the universe expanded past the school.

== Cast and characters ==
There are six primary characters featured in Lunatics, all portrayed by Chris Lilley.

- Keith Dick - a fashion wannabe who is in love with Karen, a cash register
- Becky Douglas - a 7-foot-3 girl who has moved to California to attend college with her non-identical twin sister
- Gavin McGregor - an obnoxious 12 year old destined to become the future earl of an English country estate
- Jana Melhoopen-Jonks - a South African lesbian pet psychic to the stars
- Quentin Cook - an incompetent real-estate agent who dreams of one day becoming a famous DJ and artist
- Joyce Jeffries - a former adult film star who has become an extreme hoarder

=== Other characters ===
- Leena Arora as Patika Dick
- Amanda Murphy as Marilyn
- Anne McCaffery-French as Helen
- Philip Keogan as Ken
- Joe Murray as Dylan
- Harry Radbone as Oscar
- Millie Morice as Clementine
- Emma Wilson as Colleen
- Ariana Doolan as Rashish
- Chloe Stout as Lucy
- Dylan Gavasse as Jack
- Alyssa Macintosh as Sharnay
- Cameron Leonard as Aaron
- Tracey McGown as Becky's Mum
- Darren McGown as Becky's Dad
- Katy Ferguson as Renee
- Evie Ferguson as Renee's 1st daughter
- Milly Ferguson as Renee's 2nd daughter
- Jessica Rockliff as Ingrid
- Bianca Daniels as Kylie
- Michelle Smit as Client
- Brock Thornburgh as Ethan
- Jett Thornburgh as Dustin
- Steve Minton as Brian
- Kim Kemp as Lyn
- Judi Young as Rhonda
- Antony Turrisi as Con
- Kane Sheehy as Harrison
- Min Suk Chin as Lingers (Tsun-Ling)
- Cassie Wang as Nancy

== Episodes ==
No.	Title	Directed by	Written by	Original release date
1	"Episode 1"	Chris Lilley	Chris Lilley	19 April 2019
2	"Episode 2"	Chris Lilley	Chris Lilley	19 April 2019
3	"Episode 3"	Chris Lilley	Chris Lilley	19 April 2019
4	"Episode 4"	Chris Lilley	Chris Lilley	19 April 2019
5	"Episode 5"	Chris Lilley	Chris Lilley	19 April 2019
6	"Episode 6"	Chris Lilley	Chris Lilley	19 April 2019
7	"Episode 7"	Chris Lilley	Chris Lilley	19 April 2019
8	"Episode 8"	Chris Lilley	Chris Lilley	19 April 2019
9	"Episode 9"	Chris Lilley	Chris Lilley	19 April 2019
10	"Episode 10"	Chris Lilley	Chris Lilley	19 April 2019

== Production ==
=== Development ===
In March 2018, it was announced that Lilley had been signed by Netflix to create a 10-part series. The series was filmed on the Gold Coast, Queensland.

=== Casting ===
Alongside the series order announcement, it was confirmed that Lilley would star in the lead role.

== Release ==
On 11 April 2019, the official trailer for the series was released. The first season was released on Netflix on 19 April 2019.
