= Bruce Davidson (politician) =

Australian politician

Member of the Queensland Legislative Assembly for Noosa
- In office 19 September 1992 – 17 February 2001
- Preceded by: New seat
- Succeeded by: Cate Molloy

Personal details
- Born: Bruce William Davidson; 15 March 1951 (age 75) Leeton, New South Wales, Australia
- Party: Liberal Party
- Occupation: Restaurateur, Retailer

Bruce William Davidson (born 15 March 1951) is a former Australian politician. He was the Liberal member for Noosa in the Legislative Assembly of Queensland from 1992 to 2001.

Davidson was born in Leeton, New South Wales, and was a retailer and restaurateur before entering politics. Elected as Noosa's first MP in 1992, he was Shadow Minister for Tourism, Consumer Affairs and Regional Development from 1995 to 1996, and served as the minister during the Borbidge Government from 1996 to 1998. Following the formation of the Beattie Government in 1998, he became Shadow Minister for Fair Trading and Consumer Affairs, serving until 2000. In 2001 he was defeated by Labor candidate Cate Molloy.

Parliament of Queensland
Preceded by New seat	Member for Noosa; 1992–2001	Succeeded by Cate Molloy
