= Michael Choi (politician) =

Australian politician

Michael Choi OAM JP

Member of the Queensland Legislative Assembly for Capalaba
- In office 17 February 2001 – 23 March 2012
- Preceded by: Jim Elder
- Succeeded by: Steve Davies

Personal details
- Born: Michael Wai-Man Choi; 4 March 1959 (age 67) Hong Kong, China
- Party: Labor
- Education: University of Queensland
- Occupation: Engineer

Michael Wai-Man Choi (born 4 March 1959) is an Australian Labor Party politician who represented the electoral district of Capalaba in the Legislative Assembly of Queensland.

== Early life ==
Choi was born in Hong Kong and came to Sydney in 1976 at the age of 17.

== Political career ==
Choi was elected to Parliament on 17 February 2001. He was appointed by Peter Beattie as a Parliamentary Secretary in 2006. After Anna Bligh became Premier in 2007, he and Gary Fenlon both acted as Parliamentary Secretary to the Minister for Transport, Trade, Employment and Industrial Relations, John Mickel, and Choi also assisted Lindy Nelson-Carr with her Multicultural Affairs brief. Following the 2009 state election, he was appointed Parliamentary Secretary for Natural Resources, Water and Energy and Trade, assisting Stephen Robertson. From February 2011 to March 2012, he was Parliamentary Secretary for Trade and Multicultural Affairs. Choi was defeated in the 2012 state election.

== Family and professional life ==
He is married and has three daughters.

Choi is a professional chartered engineer.

Choi has served as Honorary Ambassador for Brisbane city, fostering ties between Brisbane and Asia Pacific countries, as well as chairing the Sister Cities Committee with the Chinese city of Shenzhen. As president of the Valley Business Association, he helped the Valley business community through the Fitzgerald Inquiry period.

He is also involved in many professional and community organisations such as the Housing Industry Association, and the Small Business Council of Queensland, and was a director of Queensland Ballet Inc.

Parliament of Queensland
Preceded by Jim Elder	Member for Capalaba; 2001–2012	Succeeded by Steve Davies
