= Ariana Doolan =

Australian politician

Ariana Doolan MP

Member of the Queensland Legislative Assembly for Pumicestone
- Incumbent
- Assumed office 26 October 2024
- Preceded by: Ali King

Personal details
- Born: 31 January 2002 (age 24)
- Party: Liberal National
- Education: Glasshouse Christian College
- Alma mater: Griffith University

Ariana Doolan (born 31 January 2002) is an Australian politician in the state of Queensland. Doolan is a state MP for the electoral district of Pumicestone in Queensland's south-eastern region. She was elected at the 2024 state election (26 October) and is the youngest female MP in the state's history.

== Early life ==
Doolan was born to Yonell and Fenton Doolan. Both her parents are teachers and work in education in the Moreton Bay area. Doolan has stated that her grandparents fled South Africa during the apartheid era. Her mother is South African/Indian whose grandparents fled to Australia and her father was born to Irish grandparents.

She attended Hercules Road State School in Kippa-Ring and Glasshouse Christian College in Beerwah, and from a young age was involved in her families newsagency. After announced as the winner of the Pumicestone electorate Doolan told The Courier-Mail she was subject to racial bullying at school, being called the N-word.

In 2019, Doolan starred in Australian comedy TV series Lunatics on Netflix. The following year she produced and directed a tourism commercial with Robert Irwin and Baz Luhrmann's daughter Lily. She worked as a teachers aide at Redcliffe State High School.

Doolan is currently studying at Griffith University and resides in Beachmere with her parents.

== Political career ==
Upon graduating school in 2019, at 18-years-old, Doolan became a Youth Parliament member, when announced as the Youth Member for Glass House. Doolan served as a Youth Member from the start to the end of 2020. She indicated that inspiration for applying to the youth model parliament was to gain experience potentially to become a politician. Doolan worked as an Assistant Electorate Officer to Glass House MP Andrew Powell in late 2023.

By March 2024, it was revealed that Doolan was the Liberal National (LNP) candidate for the seat of Pumicestone. In early November 2024, it was announced that Doolan had won the seat by around 290 votes, becoming the youngest female state MP in Queensland.

== Filmography ==
Year	Title	Role	References
2019	Lunatics	Rashish	

Parliament of Queensland
Preceded by Ali King	Member for Pumicestone; 2024–present	Incumbent
