= Don Brown (Australian politician) =

Australian politician

- Brown in April 2024

Queensland Government Chief Whip
- In office 11 December 2017 – 26 October 2024
- Premier: Annastacia Palaszczuk
- Preceded by: Chris Whiting
- Succeeded by: Mark Boothman

Member of the Queensland Legislative Assembly for Capalaba
- In office 31 January 2015 – 26 October 2024
- Preceded by: Steve Davies
- Succeeded by: Russell Field

Personal details
- Born: Donald Jon Brown; 3 January 1981 (age 45) Brisbane, Queensland
- Party: Labor (since 2005)
- Education: Queensland University of Technology
- Occupation: Pathology scientist Union official
- Website: www.donbrown.com.au

Donald Jon Brown (born 3 January 1981) is an Australian politician. He served as the Labor member for Capalaba in the Queensland Legislative Assembly from 2015 until his defeat at the 2024 Queensland state election.

== Early life ==
Prior to entering politics, Brown has studied applied science and law at Queensland University of Technology, and had worked as a pathology scientist, and as a union official for United Voice.

== Political career ==
He served as the Chief Government Whip in the Queensland Legislative Assembly from December 2017 until October 2024.

Parliament of Queensland
Preceded by Steve Davies	Member for Capalaba; 2015–2024	Succeeded by Russell Field
