= Glen Elmes =

Australian politician

Minister for Aboriginal, Torres Strait Islander and Multicultural Affairs of Queensland
- In office 23 April 2012 – 14 February 2015
- Premier: Campbell Newman
- Preceded by: Jack Dempsey
- Succeeded by: Curtis Pitt (Aboriginal and Torres Srait Islander) Shannon Fentiman (Multicultural)

Minister assisting the Premier of Queensland
- In office 23 April 2012 – 14 February 2015
- Premier: Campbell Newman
- Preceded by: Jack Dempsey
- Succeeded by: Stirling Hinchliffe (Assistant Minister of State Assisting the Premier)

Member of the Queensland Parliament for Noosa
- In office 9 September 2006 – 25 November 2017
- Preceded by: Cate Molloy
- Succeeded by: Sandy Bolton

Personal details
- Born: 11 August 1955 (age 71) Brisbane, Queensland, Australia
- Party: Liberal National Party
- Spouse: Lesleigh
- Children: 2
- Occupation: Radio station manager

Glen Wayne Elmes (born 11 August 1955) is an Australian politician who represented Noosa in the Legislative Assembly of Queensland from 2006 to 2017. Elmes is a member of the Liberal National Party (LNP).

Prior to entering parliament, Elmes worked for 34 years in the commercial radio industry throughout Queensland, 22 of which were in the Sunshine Coast region. Before election, he was the general manager of Sunshine Coast stations Classic Hits 107.1; FM Noosa and Classic Hits 558 AM 4GY (Gympie). He lives in Noosaville with wife Lesleigh and their two children.

== Parliamentary career ==
Elmes is a member of the Liberal National Party of Queensland, having been a long-standing member of the Liberal Party before its merger with the Nationals.

In opposition, he served as Parliamentary Secretary to Shadow Minister for Environment and Multiculturalism from 21 September 2006 to 12 August 2008, when he was appointed Deputy Opposition Whip.

Following the LNP's victory at the 2012 election, it was announced he would be the LNP's nominee for (and would therefore be elected as) Speaker and Chairman of Committees in the new Parliament. On 16 April, before Parliament met, it was announced he would be appointed Minister for Aboriginal and Torres Strait Islander and Multicultural Affairs and Minister assisting the Premier. In doing so on 23 April 2012, he replaced Jack Dempsey, who took the role of Minister for Police and Community Safety following David Gibson's resignation following revelations that the latter had been driving with his licence suspended.

Elmes was also a member of the Integrity, Ethics and Parliamentary Privileges Committee from 9 February 2010 until Parliament was prorogued on 19 February 2012.

Parliament of Queensland
Preceded by Cate Molloy	Member for Noosa; 2006–2017	Succeeded by Sandy Bolton
