= Cate Molloy =

Australian politician (born 1955)

Member of the Queensland Legislative Assembly for Noosa
- In office 17 February 2001 – 9 September 2006
- Preceded by: Bruce Davidson
- Succeeded by: Glen Elmes

Personal details
- Born: 11 May 1955 (age 71) East Melbourne, Victoria, Australia
- Party: Independent
- Other political affiliations: Labor
- Spouse: Ivan Molloy
- Occupation: Enrolled nurse

Cathryn Molloy (born 11 May 1955) is an Australian former politician. She was a Labor and independent member of the Legislative Assembly of Queensland from 2001 to 2006, representing the district of Noosa.

Molloy first entered Queensland state parliament as one of a number of newly elected Labor MPs following the party's landslide win at the 2001 state election. She was subsequently re-elected at the 2004 state election.

In 2006, Molloy publicly opposed her party's policy to build a dam on the Mary River. This stance resulted in her disendorsement as a Labor Party candidate in June 2006. She continued to sit as a Labor MP before quitting the party in August 2006. Thereafter, Molloy sat out the remainder of her term as an independent before being defeated at the 2006 state election. The following year, Molloy unsuccessfully contested the federal seat of Wide Bay, also in an independent capacity. In the 2009 state election, she unsuccessfully re-contested Noosa.

Molloy was born in East Melbourne, Victoria. She was married to Ivan Molloy, who was the endorsed Labor candidate for Fairfax at the 2004 federal election.

Parliament of Queensland
Preceded by Bruce Davidson	Member for Noosa; 2001–2006	Succeeded by Glen Elmes
