= List of acts of the Parliament of Queensland from 1860 =

This is a list of acts of the Parliament of Queensland for the year 1860.

== 1860 ==
Short title, or popular name	Citation	Royal assent
Long title
Legislative Assembly Quorum Act 1860	23 Vict. No. 1	11 June 1860
An Act to provide a suitable quorum for the Legislative Assembly.
Gold Export Duty Repeal Act 1860	24 Vict. No. 1	
Disqualification of Officers Act 1860	24 Vict. No. 2	17 July 1860
An Act to limit the number of persons holding office under the Crown who under the Constitution Act 17 Victoria No. 41 may be declared capable of being elected members of the Legislative Assembly.
State Aid Discontinuance Act 1860	24 Vict. No. 3	
Adjustment of Accounts with New South Wales Act 1860	24 Vict. No. 4	25 August 1860
An Act to appoint Commissioners for the adjustment of Account with the Colony of New South Wales.
Census Act for 1861	24 Vict. No. 5	25 August 1860
An Act for taking an account of the Population in 1861.
Education Act 1860 or the Primary Schools Act 1860	24 Vict. No. 6	7 September 1860
An Act to provide for Primary Education in Queensland.
Grammar Schools Act 1860	24 Vict. No. 7	7 September 1860
An Act to provide for the Establishment of Grammar Schools in Queensland.
Appropriation Act 1860	24 Vict. No. 8	11 September 1860
An Act to authorise the appropriation out of the Consolidated Revenue Fund of Queensland of certain sums to make good the supplies granted for the service of the year 1860.
Electoral Lists Collection Abolition Act 1860	24 Vict. No. 9	
Lien on Wool Act 1860	24 Vict. No. 10	11 September 1860
An Act to give a lien on wool and to make mortgages of sheep cattle and horses.
Unoccupied Crown Lands Occupation Act 1860	24 Vict. No. 11	
Tenders for Crown Lands Act 1860	24 Vict. No. 12	
Scab and Other Diseases in Sheep Prevention Act 1860	24 Vict. No. 13	
Gunpowder and Warlike Stores Exportation Act 1860	24 Vict. No. 14	17 September 1860
An Act to regulate the exportation of gunpowder and warlike stores from the Colony of Queensland.
Alienation of Crown Lands Act 1860	24 Vict. No. 15	
Occupied Crown Lands Leasing Act 1860	24 Vict. No. 16	
Appropriation Act 1860–1	24 Vict. No. 17	18 September 1860
An Act to authorise the appropriation out of the Consolidated Revenue Fund of Queensland of certain sums to make good the supplies granted for the service of the year 1860–1.
Governor's Salary Act 1860	24 Vict. No. 18	

== Sources ==
- "Chronological table of repealed Queensland Acts" (PDF).
