= Wayde Chiesa =

Australian politician

Wayde Chiesa MP

Member of the Queensland Legislative Assembly for Hinchinbrook
- Incumbent
- Assumed office 29 November 2025
- Preceded by: Nick Dametto

Personal details
- Born: Ingham, Queensland, Australia
- Party: Liberal National
- Occupation: Politician

Wayde Chiesa is an Australian politician who has represented the Queensland electoral district of Hinchinbrook in the Queensland Legislative Assembly since 2025, when he won a November by-election.

== Early life ==
Chiesa was born and raised in Ingham, and was a childhood friend of Premier David Crisafulli. He grew up on his family's sugarcane farm, and moved to Townsville for university.

== Career ==
Chiesa previously served as CEO of Regional Development Australia Townsville and North West Queensland, and as Director of Regional Development and Investment at a local non-profit in Townsville. He also worked for Townsville City Council and is a chartered accountant. For almost two decades, he was a sports commentator with sports broadcast narrator.

He successfully contested the 2025 Hinchinbrook state by-election with the Liberal National Party, succeeding Nick Dametto of Katter's Australian Party, who resigned to run for mayor of Townsville. The victory marked the first time a sitting Queensland government gained a seat in a by-election since 1998.

Chiesa is a member of the Governance, Energy and Finance Committee.

Parliament of Queensland
Preceded by Nick Dametto	Member for Hinchinbrook; 2025–present	Succeeded by
