= Steve Davies (politician) =

Australian Liberal National politician

Member of the Queensland Legislative Assembly for Capalaba
- In office 24 March 2012 – 31 January 2015
- Preceded by: Michael Choi
- Majority: Don Brown

Personal details
- Born: 26 October 1965 (age 60)
- Party: Liberal National Party of Queensland
- Profession: Business development manager

Stephen William "Steve" Davies (born 26 October 1965) is an Australian Liberal National politician who was the member of the Legislative Assembly of Queensland for Capalaba from 2012 to 2015.

Parliament of Queensland
Preceded by Michael Choi	Member for Capalaba; 2012–2015	Succeeded by Don Brown
