= Glasshouse Christian College =

Location
- 58 Roberts Road; Beerwah, Queensland; Australia; 26.861°S 152.952°E

Information
- Type: Private, Christian
- Motto: Growing in faith and knowledge
- Denomination: Baptist
- Established: 2000
- Principal: Mike Curtis
- Grades: P–12
- Enrolment: 1080
- Colours: Dark red, green and dark gold
- Website: https://www.glasshouse.qld.edu.au/

Glasshouse Christian College is an independent Christian school located on the Sunshine Coast in Beerwah, Queensland, Australia. The college was established by the Glasshouse Country Baptist Church and first opened on 31 January 2000 with an enrolment of 16 students, and has since expanded to a college of more than 1070 students from Prep to Year 12.

Since January 2008, the school's role of Principal has been held by Mike Curtis.

== Facilities ==
Glasshouse Christian College consists of the following school facilities:

- More than 60 classrooms
- Modern Music & Performing Arts Centre
- Sports Centre with Gymnasium and Undercover Courts
- School library
- Theatre
- Hospitality Kitchen
- Industrial Technology and Engineering Workshops
- Dance Studio
- Science Laboratories
- Two Sports Ovals
- Three large undercover areas
- Two Courtyards
- Three Playgrounds
- Access to a fully working Farm
