= Russell Field =

Australian politician

Russell Field MP

Member of the Queensland Legislative Assembly for Capalaba
- Incumbent
- Assumed office 26 October 2024
- Preceded by: Don Brown

Personal details
- Party: Liberal National
- Website: https://russellfield.com.au/

Russell Field is an Australian politician and anti-crime advocate. A member of the Liberal National Party (LNP), he was elected member of the Legislative Assembly of Queensland for Capalaba in the 2024 Queensland state election.

== Political career ==
Field's son Matthew was killed alongside his pregnant fiancée by a teenager in a stolen car on Australia Day in 2021, which Field claims inspired him to run for Parliament.

At the 2024 state election, Field won the seat of Capalaba in Brisbane for the Liberal National Party (LNP). He defeated sitting Labor MP Don Brown, who in 2023 described youth crime as a "media beat-up".

Parliament of Queensland
Preceded by Don Brown	Member for Capalaba; 2024–present	Incumbent
