= Sandy Bolton =

Australian politician (born 1964)

Sandy Bolton MP
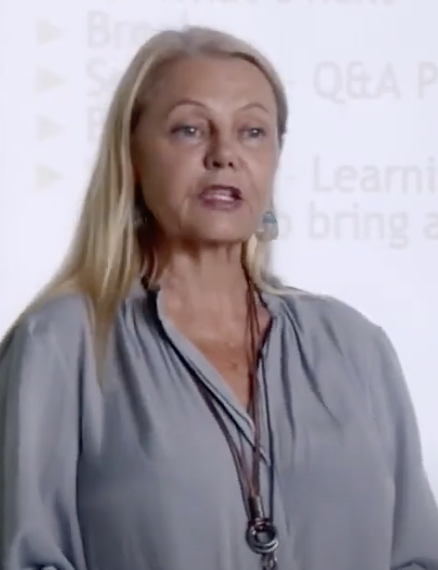

Member of the Queensland Legislative Assembly for Noosa
- Incumbent
- Assumed office 25 November 2017
- Preceded by: Glen Elmes

Personal details
- Born: 3 March 1964 (age 62) Gosford, New South Wales
- Party: Independent
- Domestic partner: Ian Schuback
- Website: https://www.sandybolton.com/

Sandra Leigh Bolton (born 3 March 1964) is an Australian politician. She has been the Independent member for Noosa in the Queensland Legislative Assembly since 2017.

She is a graduate of Central Queensland University.

Bolton was one of the original councillors when the Shire of Noosa was de-amalgamated in 2013. She narrowly missed out on being elected as mayor in 2016.

Her partner is lawn bowls champion Ian Schuback.

Parliament of Queensland
Preceded by Glen Elmes	Member for Noosa; 2017–present	Incumbent
