= Electoral district of Noosa =

State electoral district of Queensland, Australia

Noosa Queensland—Legislative Assembly
- Electoral map of Noosa 2017
- State: Queensland
- MP: Sandy Bolton
- Party: Independent
- Namesake: Noosa Heads
- Electors: 36,797 (2020)
- Area: 728 km^{2} (281.1 sq mi)
- Demographic: Provincial
- Coordinates: 26°20′S 153°1′E
Electorates around Noosa:
Gympie	Gympie	Coral Sea
Gympie	Noosa	Coral Sea
Nicklin	Ninderry	Coral Sea

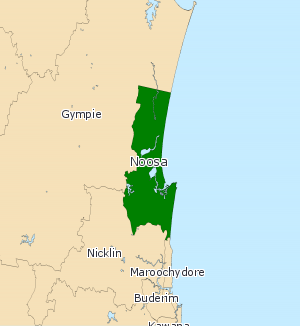
Electoral map of Noosa 2008

Noosa is a Legislative Assembly of Queensland electoral district in the Australian state of Queensland. The electorate is centred on Noosa and stretches northwest to the southern border of Gympie, south to Peregian Springs and west to Eumundi.

The electorate was formed in 1992 following the redistribution of the Electoral district of Cooroora.

The seat is currently held by Sandy Bolton, an independent.

== Members for Noosa ==
Member	Party	Term
Bruce Davidson	Liberal	1992–2001
Cate Molloy	Labor	2001–2006
Cate Molloy	Independent	2006–2006
Glen Elmes	Liberal	2006–2008
Glen Elmes	Liberal National	2008–2017
Sandy Bolton	Independent	2017–present

== Election results ==
2024 Queensland state election: Noosa
Party	Candidate	Votes	%	±%
Independent	Sandy Bolton	14,237	43.22	−0.68
Liberal National	Clare Stewart	11,843	35.96	+6.76
Labor	Mark Denham	3,066	9.31	−5.09
Greens	Rhonda Prescott	1,865	5.66	−1.54
One Nation	Darrel Hinson	1,550	4.71	+1.11
Family First	Felicity Roser	377	1.14	+1.14
Total formal votes		32,938	96.68	
Informal votes		1,131	3.32	
Turnout		34,069	88.34	
Two-candidate-preferred result
Independent	Sandy Bolton	19,283	58.54	−7.26
Liberal National	Clare Stewart	13,655	41.46	+7.26
Independent hold		Swing	−7.26	

Primary vote results in Noosa (Parties that have never gotten 5% of the vote are omitted)
Liberal/Liberal National

National

Labor
Greens
One Nation
Palmer United
Katter's Australian
Independent
View source data.
Two-candidate-preferred vote results in Noosa View source data.
