= 2025 Hinchinbrook state by-election =

By-election in Queensland, Australia

- 29 November 2025

Electoral district of Hinchinbrook in the Queensland Legislative Assembly
- Registered: 39,818
- Turnout: 77.81% (▼10.15)
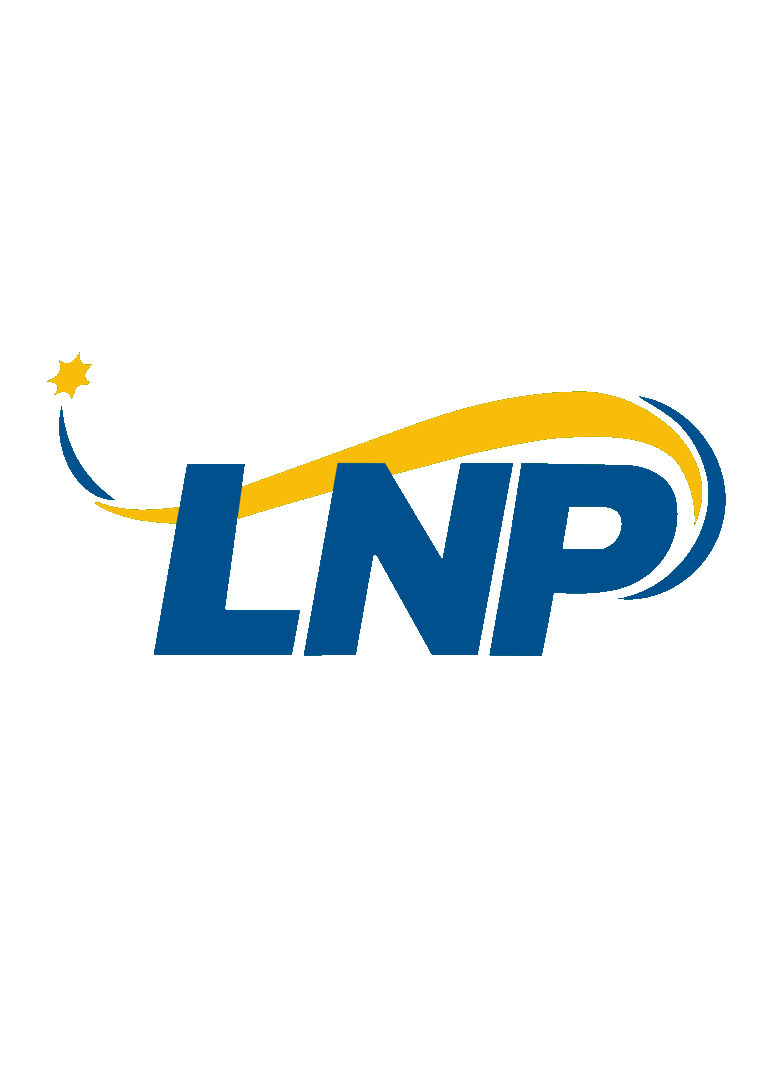

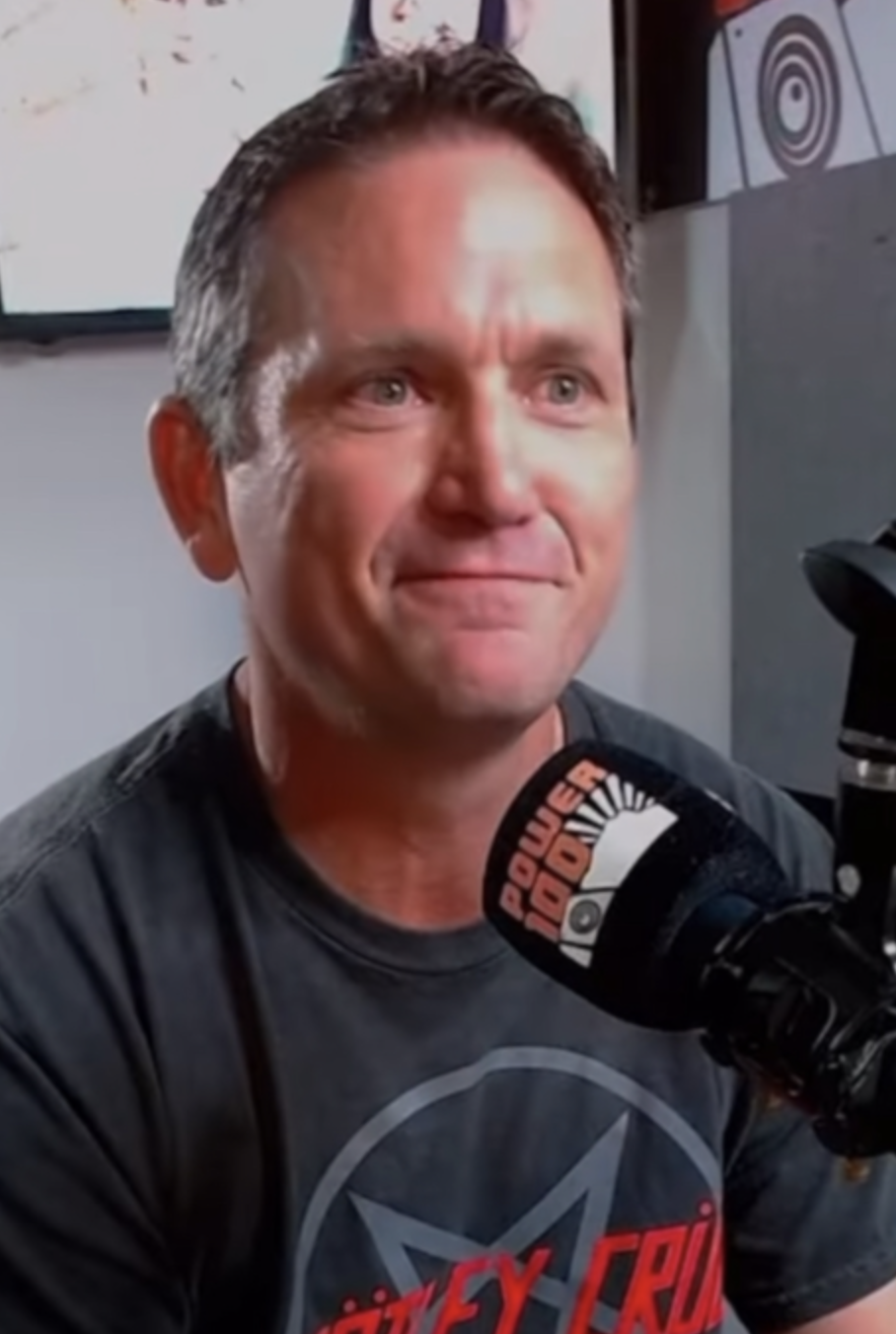

	First party	Second party
Candidate	Wayde Chiesa	Mark Molachino
Party	Liberal National	Katter's Australian
Primary vote	12,271	8,964
Percentage	41.23%	30.12%
Swing	▲13.01	▼16.30
TCP	53.70%	46.30%
TCP swing	▲16.87	▼16.87
	Third party	Fourth party
Candidate	Luke Sleep	Maurie Soars
Party	One Nation	Labor
Primary vote	4,011	2,490
Percentage	13.48%	8.37%
Swing	▲8.88	▼5.66
MP before election
Nick Dametto
Katter's Australian
Elected MP
Wayde Chiesa
Liberal National

The 2025 Hinchinbrook state by-election was held on 29 November 2025 to elect the member for Hinchinbrook in the Queensland Legislative Assembly, following the resignation of Katter's Australian Party (KAP) MP Nick Dametto.

Dametto, who had served as the member for Hinchinbrook since 2017, announced his resignation on 26 September 2025 in order to contest a by-election for Townsville mayor. Under Queensland law, candidates running for local government positions cannot be a member of a state or federal parliament.

Liberal National Party (LNP) candidate Wayde Chiesa won the by-election. It was the first time a sitting Queensland government has gained a seat in a by-election since Mulgrave in 1998.

== Background ==
=== 2024 election results ===
2024 Queensland state election: Hinchinbrook
Party	Candidate	Votes	%	±%
Katter's Australian	Nick Dametto	15,351	46.42	+3.88
Liberal National	Annette Swaine	9,331	28.22	+3.28
Labor	Ina Pryor	4,639	14.03	−5.41
One Nation	Ric Daubert	1,523	4.60	−2.52
Legalise Cannabis	Kevin Wheatley	1,181	3.57	+3.57
Greens	Jon Kowski	1,044	3.16	−0.27
Total formal votes		33,069	96.57	+0.02
Informal votes		1,175	3.43	−0.02
Turnout		34,244	87.96	+0.97
Two-candidate-preferred result
Katter's Australian	Nick Dametto	20,889	63.17	−1.59
Liberal National	Annette Swaine	12,180	36.83	+1.59
Katter's Australian hold		Swing	−1.59	

== Candidates ==
Candidates are listed in the order they appeared on the ballot.

Party	Candidate	Background
Liberal National	Wayde Chiesa	Former RDA North Queensland CEO
Independent	Steven Clare	Former One Nation candidate for Thuringowa (2024)
Labor	Maurie Soars	Former Townsville councillor
Greens	Aiden Creagh	Locomotive driver and baker
Katter's Australian	Mark Molachino	Former deputy mayor of Townsville
Family First	Amanda Nickson	Former candidate for Burdekin (2024) and Dawson (2025)
One Nation	Luke Sleep	Coal miner

=== Katter's Australian ===
On 8 October 2025, the KAP announced its candidate would be Mark Molachino, a former deputy mayor of Townsville who served as the councillor for Division 4 from 2016 until losing his seat in 2024. Molachino was previously a member of the Labor Party. The People First Party has endorsed Molachino.

Dametto resigned from the KAP to contest the mayoral by-election as an independent. He has not endorsed a candidate in the Hinchinbrook by-election, saying "I don't really care if it's Katter that holds that seat afterwards, or the LNP or Labor Party, who knows, independent". However, Dametto confirmed on 21 November 2025 that he would vote for the KAP.

=== Liberal National ===
Wayde Chiesa, the former Regional Development Australia (RDA) Townsville and North West Queensland CEO, was preselected as the Liberal National Party (LNP) candidate on 14 October 2025.

=== Labor ===
The Labor Party confirmed on 14 October 2025 that it would contest the by-election. On 3 November 2025, it announced former Townsville councillor Maurie Soars would be its candidate.

=== One Nation ===
Pauline Hanson's One Nation announced Lisa Buchtmann, a small business owner and former Australian Army truck driver, as its candidate on 15 October 2025. One week later, she withdrew her candidacy because of a personal health matter. Coal miner Luke Sleep replaced Buchtmann on 11 November 2025.

=== Others ===
The Greens announced Aiden Creagh as its candidate on 8 November 2025.

== How-to-vote cards ==
Candidates can provide how-to-vote cards with recommendations for voters on how to preference other parties. Independent candidate Steven Clare did not submit a how-to-vote card.

The Katter's Australian Party issued two alternative cards, varying in the position of the LNP and Labor. One Nation recommended preferencing the LNP above the KAP; One Nation member and former federal MP George Christensen subsequently supported preferencing the KAP higher.

Candidate	How-to-vote card (read column top down)						
Candidate	LNP	IND	ALP	GRN	KAP	FFP	ONP
Liberal National	1	—N/a	5	4	5/6	6	3
Steven Clare (Ind.)	6	—N/a	6	5	4	4	4
Labor	5	—N/a	1	2	5/6	5	6
Greens	7	—N/a	3	1	7	7	7
Katter's Australian	4	—N/a	2	3	1	2	5
Family First	2	—N/a	4	6	3	1	2
One Nation	3	—N/a	7	7	2	3	1

== Results ==
2025 Hinchinbrook state by-election
Party	Candidate	Votes	%	±%
Liberal National	Wayde Chiesa	12,271	41.23	+13.01
Katter's Australian	Mark Molachino	8,964	30.12	–16.30
One Nation	Luke Sleep	4,011	13.48	+8.88
Labor	Maurie Soars	2,490	8.37	−5.66
Greens	Aiden Creagh	1,046	3.51	+0.35
Family First	Amanda Nickson	646	2.17	+2.17
Independent	Steven Clare	333	1.12	+1.12
Total formal votes		29,761	96.06	–0.51
Informal votes		1,221	3.94	+0.51
Turnout		30,982	77.81	−10.15
Two-candidate-preferred result
Liberal National	Wayde Chiesa	15,982	53.70	+16.87
Katter's Australian	Mark Molachino	13,779	46.30	–16.87
Liberal National gain from Katter's Australian		Swing	+16.87	

=== By polling place ===
Polling place	Primary vote							2CP vote	
Polling place	LNP	KAP	ONP	ALP	GRN	FFP	IND	LNP	KAP
Bluewater	171	207	118	58	34	16	4	44.08%	55.92%
Burdell	481	271	144	141	67	37	17	56.56%	43.44%
Burdell North	309	293	99	94	67	34	15	49.51%	50.49%
Cardwell	273	102	104	23	23	13	4	66.61%	33.39%
Deeragun	409	367	124	93	51	16	10	50.37%	49.63%
Forrest Beach	124	77	51	15	13	7	1	57.64%	42.36%
Halifax	79	51	28	18	5	3	3	58.29%	41.71%
Ingham	272	130	86	36	29	20	7	58.45%	41.55%
Kennedy	81	31	56	8	6	2	0	63.04%	36.96%
Long Pocket	83	34	14	7	6	2	3	65.10%	34.90%
Lower Tully	208	200	113	42	31	7	4	47.77%	52.23%
Lucinda	45	29	12	6	4	0	1	56.70%	43.30%
Macknade	41	14	12	3	2	1	0	68.49%	31.51%
Murray Upper	75	80	52	12	10	4	1	47.01%	52.99%
Northern Beaches	326	347	124	80	38	25	14	48.85%	51.15%
Returning Officer Hinchinbrook	2,900	1,326	513	329	85	109	33	62.93%	37.07%
Rollingstone	113	113	80	27	8	9	7	44.82%	55.18%
Rupertswood	460	510	217	112	39	30	14	46.38%	53.62%
Toobanna	37	16	22	2	2	2	0	65.43%	34.57%
Trebonne	63	9	8	0	1	0	0	83.95%	16.05%
Victoria Estate	30	16	11	2	5	1	0	61.54%	38.46%
Deeragun (early)	3,610	3,238	1,331	898	313	206	125	49.87%	50.13%
Declaration votes (in-person)	77	67	31	26	11	5	2	50.23%	49.77%
Declaration votes (Postal)	1,857	1,321	581	411	176	84	54	53.81%	46.19%
Mobile polling	28	12	2	4	2	3	1	71.15%	28.85%
Telephone voting	10	11	6	1	4	0	2	47.06%	52.94%
Telephone voting (early)	109	92	72	42	14	10	11	55.14%	44.86%

== See also ==
- 2025 Townsville mayoral by-election
