= Electoral district of Hinchinbrook =

State electoral district of Queensland, Australia

Hinchinbrook
- Map of the electoral district of Hinchinbrook, 2017
- State: Queensland
- MP: Wayde Chiesa
- Party: Liberal National
- Namesake: Hinchinbrook Island
- Electors: 35,050 (2020)
- Area: 6,497 km^{2} (2,508.5 sq mi)
- Demographic: Rural
- Coordinates: 18°25′S 146°9′E
Electorates around Hinchinbrook:
Hill	Hill	Coral Sea
Traeger	Hinchinbrook	Coral Sea
Traeger	Thuringowa	Townsville

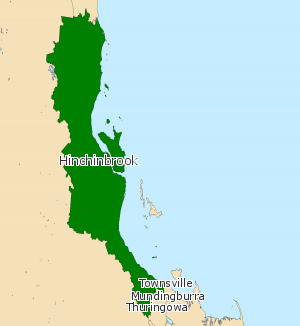
2008 map of Hinchinbrook

Hinchinbrook is an electoral district of the Legislative Assembly in the Australian state of Queensland. It is currently represented by Wayde Chiesa of the Liberal National Party.

== Geography ==
Originally primarily a rural electorate, the district in its present form is a narrow coastal strip running from south of Tully to the northern fringes of Townsville. Prior to the 2017 redistribution Hinchinbrook had spanned just south of Innisfail and included the towns of Mission Beach and Tully. Hinchinbrook now includes the towns of Cardwell, Ingham, Lucinda and includes the Northern Beaches suburbs of Townsville such as Bushland Beach.

== Political history ==
The electorate was first contested in 1950 and was held by the National Party and its successor, the Liberal National Party, for over half a century. However, even as the LNP won a landslide victory in 2012, its hold on Hinchinbrook became rather tenuous amid the rise of Katter's Australian Party, with longtime MP Andrew Cripps suffering an 11 percent swing. At the 2017 state election, Nick Dametto, a member of Katter's Australian Party defeated Cripps with a large swing which he consolidated at the 2020 election.

In late September 2025, Dametto stated he would resign from the Katter's Australian Party to contest the upcoming Townsville mayoral by-election as an independent, with the election to be held in November. On 2 October 2025, it was reported Dametto had already resigned from the party and would also be resigning from state parliament for the mayoral by-election. Dametto won the mayoral by-election with a primary vote of 61.53%. A by-election for Hinchinbrook was held on 29 November 2025 and was won by Wayde Chiesa of the Liberal National Party.

== Members for Hinchinbrook ==
Member	Party	Term
Cecil Jesson	Labor	1950–1960
John Row	Country	1960–1972
Ted Row	Country	1972–1974
Ted Row	National	1974–1989
Marc Rowell	National	1989–2006
Andrew Cripps	National	2006–2008
Andrew Cripps	Liberal National	2008–2017
Nick Dametto	Katter's Australian	2017–2025
Wayde Chiesa	Liberal National	2025–present

== Election results ==
2025 Hinchinbrook state by-election
Party	Candidate	Votes	%	±%
Liberal National	Wayde Chiesa	11,771	41.4	+13.2
Katter's Australian	Mark Molachino	8,569	30.1	–16.3
One Nation	Luke Sleep	3,834	13.5	+8.9
Labor	Maurie Soars	2,356	8.3	–5.8
Greens	Aiden Creagh	980	3.4	+0.5
Family First	Amanda Nickson	620	2.2	+2.2
Independent	Steven Clare	323	1.1	+1.1
Total formal votes		28,069	96.0	–0.6
Informal votes		1,169	4.0	+0.6
Turnout				
Two-candidate-preferred result
Liberal National	Wayde Chiesa	15,340	53.79	+16.96
Katter's Australian	Mark Molachino	13,177	46.21	–16.96
Liberal National gain from Katter's Australian		Swing	+16.96	

Results are not final. Last updated at 22:36 AEST on 29 November 2025.
