= Electoral district of Capalaba =

State electoral district of Queensland, Australia

Capalaba Queensland—Legislative Assembly
- Capalaba (2017—)
- State: Queensland
- Dates current: 1992–present
- MP: Russell Field
- Party: Liberal National
- Namesake: Capalaba
- Electors: 36,176 (2020)
- Area: 45 km^{2} (17.4 sq mi)
- Demographic: Outer-metropolitan
- Coordinates: 27°31′S 153°13′E
Electorates around Capalaba:
Lytton	Moreton Bay	Oodgeroo
Chatsworth	Capalaba	Oodgeroo
Mansfield	Springwood	Redlands

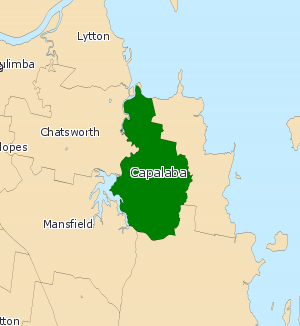
2008 map

Capalaba is an electoral division of the Legislative Assembly of Queensland in the state of Queensland, Australia. The electorate is centred on the suburb of Capalaba, in Redland City east of Brisbane, and includes parts of the adjoining suburbs of Alexandra Hills and Birkdale.

== Members for Capalaba ==
Member	Party	Term
Jim Elder	Labor	1992–2000
Jim Elder	Independent	2000–2001
Michael Choi	Labor	2001–2012
Steve Davies	Liberal National	2012–2015
Don Brown	Labor	2015–2024
Russell Field	Liberal National	2024–present

== Election results ==
2024 Queensland state election: Capalaba
Party	Candidate	Votes	%	±%
Liberal National	Russell Field	14,665	44.39	+13.48
Labor	Don Brown	12,132	36.73	−11.48
Greens	Donna Weston	3,869	11.71	+3.76
One Nation	David Schmid	2,368	7.17	+1.98
Total formal votes		33,034	96.75	+0.56
Informal votes		1,109	3.25	−0.56
Turnout		34,143	90.82	+0.45
Two-party-preferred result
Liberal National	Russell Field	17,159	51.94	+11.75
Labor	Don Brown	15,875	48.06	−11.75
Liberal National gain from Labor		Swing	+11.75	
