= Parliament of Queensland =

State legislature of Queensland, Australia

- 58th Parliament

Type
- Type: Unicameral
- Houses: Legislative Assembly
- Sovereign: King (represented by the governor of Queensland)

History
- Founded: 22 May 1860; 166 years ago

Leadership
- Monarch: Charles III since 8 September 2022
- Governor: Jeannette Young since 1 November 2021
- Speaker of the Legislative Assembly: Pat Weir, Liberal National since 26 November 2024
- Premier: David Crisafulli, Liberal National since 28 October 2024
- Leader of the Opposition: Steven Miles, Labor since 28 October 2024

Structure
- Seats: 93
- Political groups: Government (53): Liberal National (53); Opposition (36): Labor (36); Crossbench (4): Katter's Australian (2); Greens (1); Independent (1)

Elections
- Voting system: Full preferential voting
- Last election: 26 October 2024
- Next election: On or before 28 October 2028

Meeting place
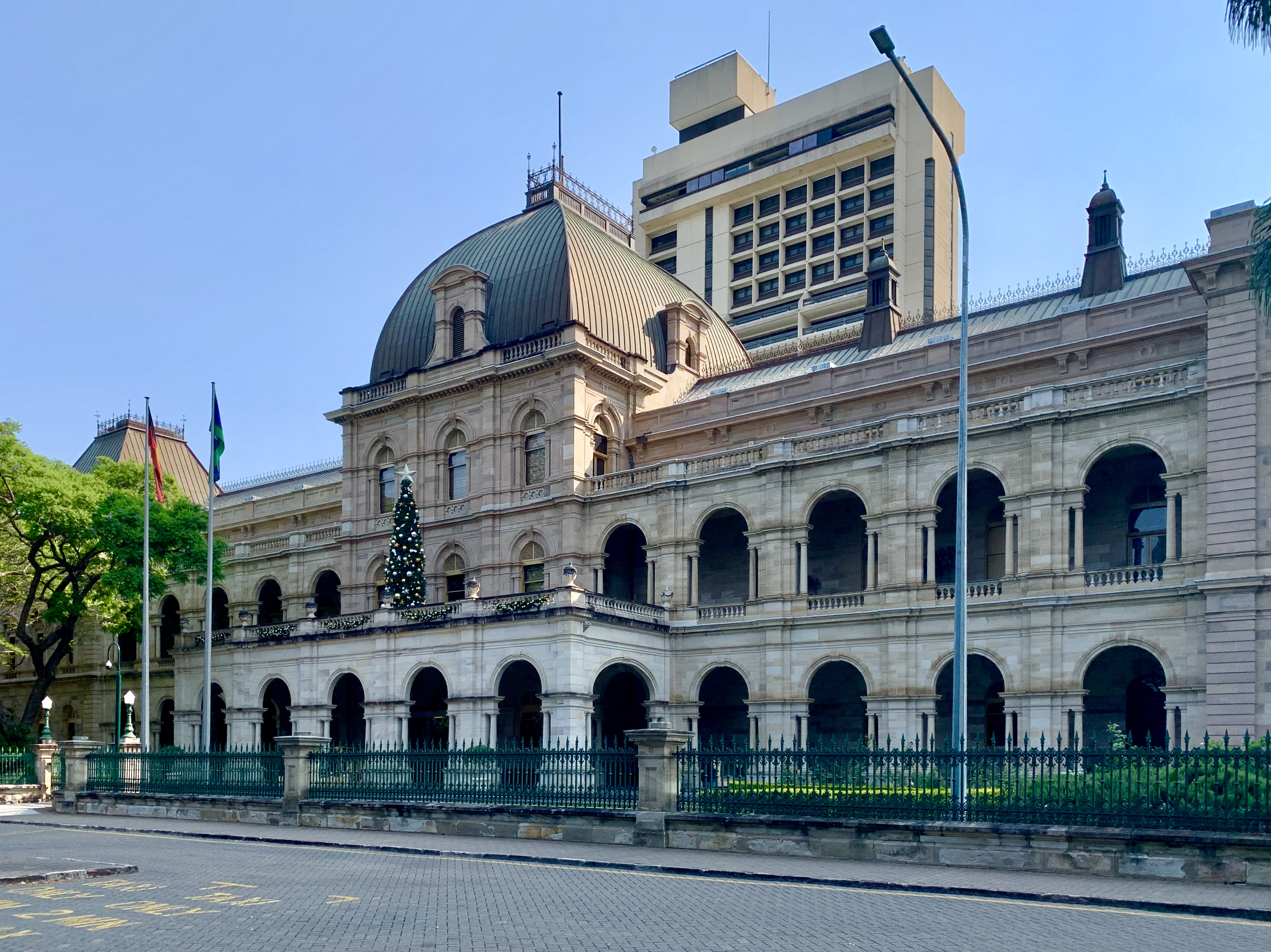
- Parliament House, Brisbane, Queensland, Australia

Website
- parliament.qld.gov.au

Constitution
- Constitution of Queensland

The Parliament of Queensland is the unicameral legislative body of the Australian state of Queensland. As provided under the Constitution of Queensland, the Parliament consists of the King (represented by the Governor of Queensland) and the Legislative Assembly. It has been the only unicameral state legislature in the country since its upper chamber, the Legislative Council, was abolished in 1922. The Legislative Assembly sits in Parliament House in the state capital, Brisbane.

The Queensland Parliament retains plenary legislative power over Queensland, however Commonwealth laws apply to the extent of any inconsistency. Some laws from the colonial era passed by the New South Wales parliament and the Imperial Parliament also remain in force.

Following the outcome of the 2015 election, four additional seats were added to the Legislative Assembly (to a total of 93), the voting system changed from optional preferential voting to full-preferential voting, and unfixed three-year terms were replaced with fixed four-year terms.

== History ==
The Parliament was founded 22 May 1860, less than a year after the Colony of Queensland was created in June 1859. It was convened at military and convict barracks converted for the purpose located on Queen Street, Brisbane. Immigration was an important issue for the early Parliament. Population growth was encouraged with new settlers enticed by land ownership.

In 1915, Queensland became the first state to make voting compulsory at state elections.

Since 1 April 2003, live audio broadcasts have streamed through the internet from the Parliament while it is in session. In June 2007, the Parliament started broadcasting video of parliamentary proceedings. Nine in-house television cameras are used to record sessions.

The Aboriginal flag and the Torres Strait Islander flag were introduced onto the floor of the Legislative Assembly chamber in 2007.

The first female Speaker, Fiona Simpson was elected on 15 May 2012.

== Membership ==
The Assembly has 93 members of Parliament (MPs). These are intended to represent approximately the same population in each electorate. Voting is by the full preferential voting system, with elections held every four years.

In April 2016, legislation was passed to increase the number of seats in the parliament by four to a total of 93. An amendment was also passed to abolish optional preferential voting. A referendum held the previous month was passed, supporting a bill to establish fixed four-year terms.

== Royal assent ==
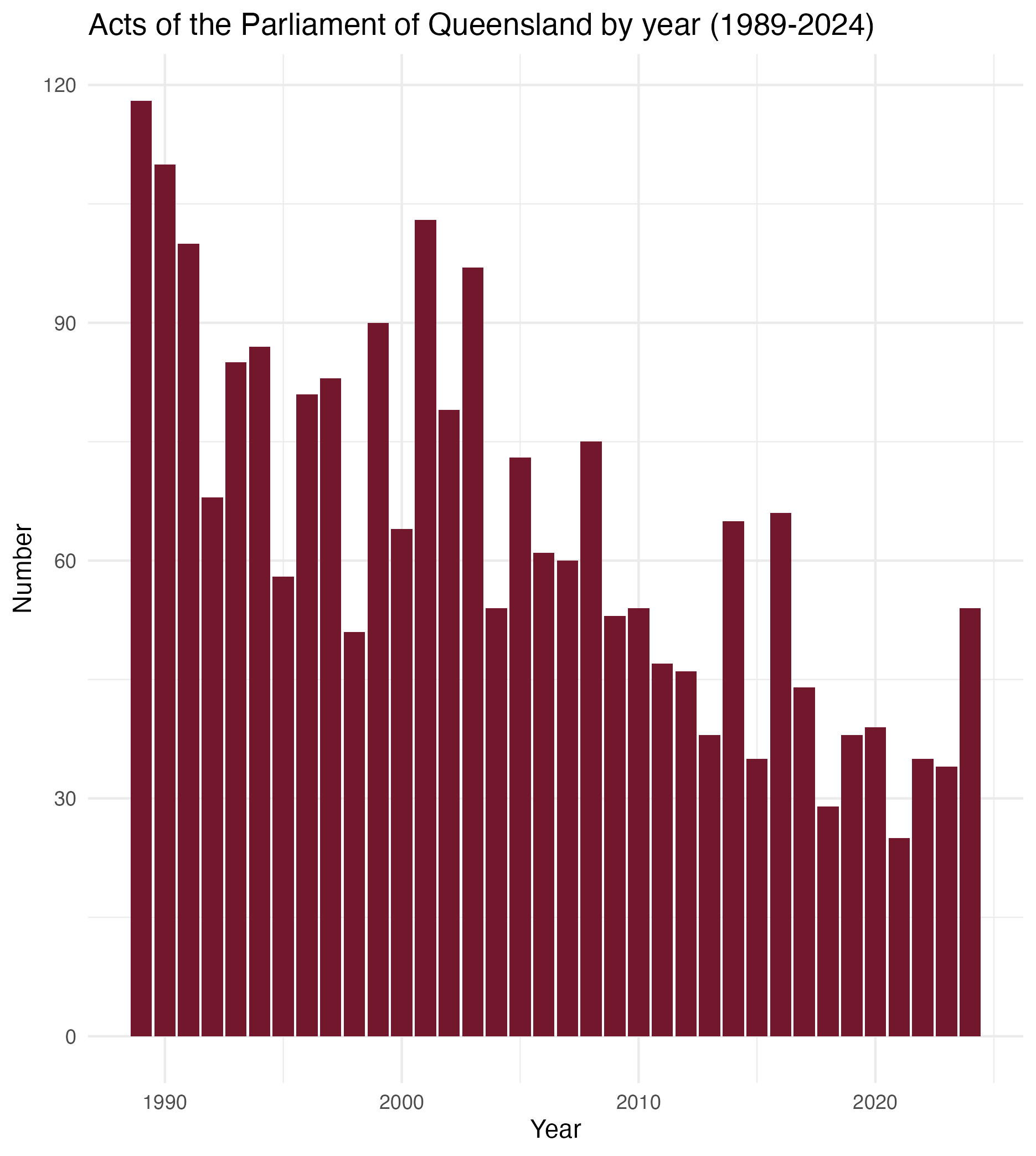
Bar chart showing the number of acts of the Parliament of Queensland by year (1989–2024)

The role of the monarch in Parliament is to give royal assent to legislation. This function is in practice exercised by the governor of Queensland, who conventionally will never refuse assent to a bill that has passed the Legislative Assembly. The party or coalition with the most seats in the house is invited by the governor to form a government.

The leader of that party subsequently becomes the premier of Queensland, leading a Cabinet of ministers. In the Liberal National Party, the premier selects members of their party to act as ministers. In the Labor Party, the ministers are elected by party room ballot, with the leader then assigning ministerial portfolios to each one.

== Operations ==
Once all winning candidates have been declared, the governor of Queensland proclaims a date for the start of the new Parliament. It is the role of the Clerk of the Parliament to call members to attendance.

According to the Constitution of Queensland, members of Parliament must swear an oath or affirmation to the King as well as an oath of office before signing a Roll of Members. This oath or affirmation must be made to the governor or someone authorised by him or her—typically the clerk of the Parliament.

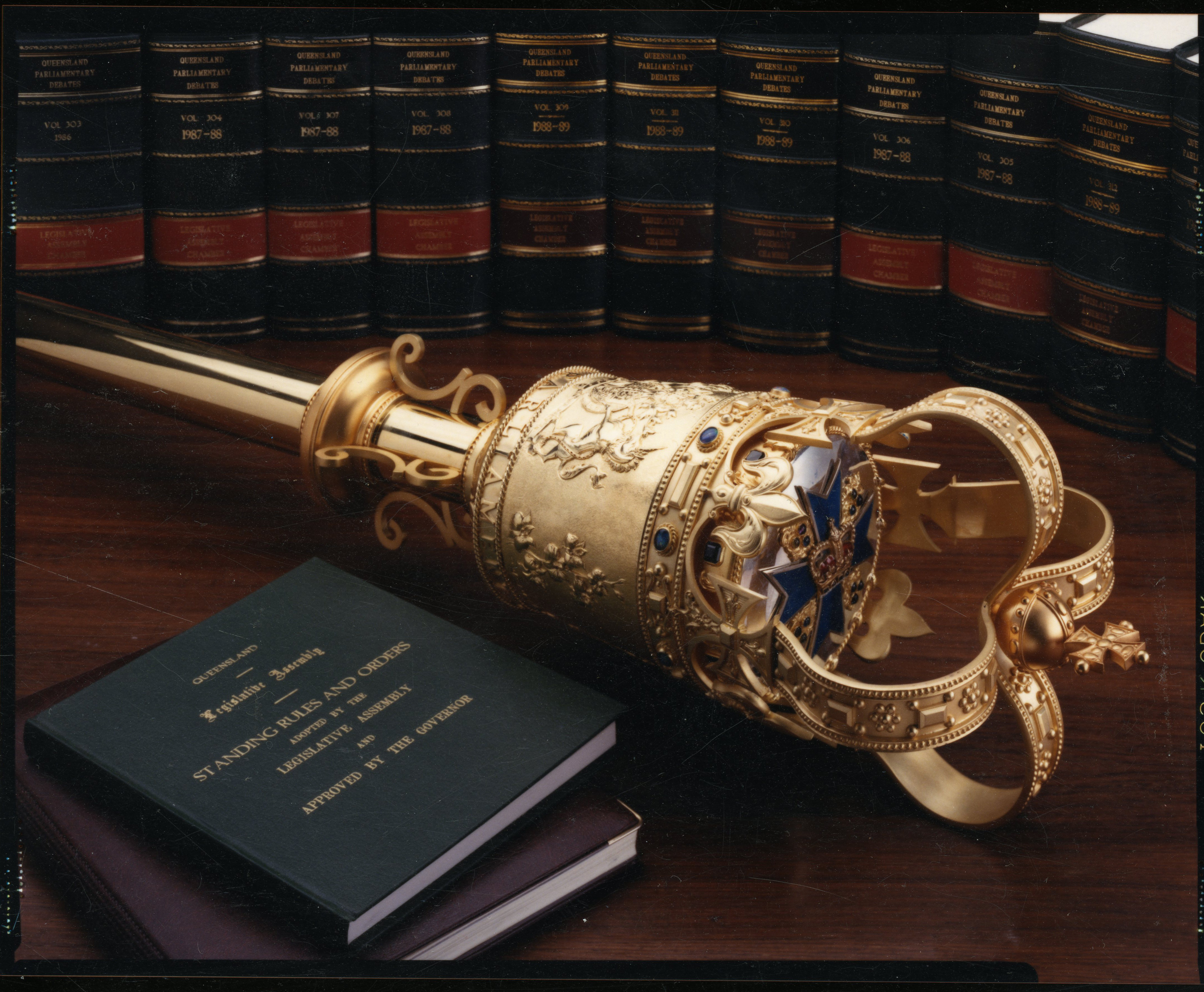
Queensland's ceremonial mace, 1979

Sworn-in representatives are required to elect a Speaker to preside over the House's business. Before this occurs, the longest serving member who is not a minister presides over the proceedings. Once elected the Speaker is dragged to the chair and presented to the Governor at Government House. The symbol of the authority of the Parliament and its Speaker is the ceremonial mace. The sergeant-at-arms carries the mace into the chamber of parliament when the speaker enters at the start of each sitting day and removes it again when the speaker leaves at the end of the sitting day. During the sitting day, the mace rests on two raised brackets on the centre table with the head of the mace lying pointed towards the government's side. The current mace was designed and made in 1978 and is sterling silver with gold plating and is encrusted with 32 Queensland gemstones. Despite being the symbol of Parliament, it is engraved with the words "Government of Queensland".

The ceremonial opening of the new Parliament is marked by a speech by the governor. Traditionally the speech is written by the new government and it may outline current activities, budget details, statistics and proposed lists of legislation which are intended to be introduced.

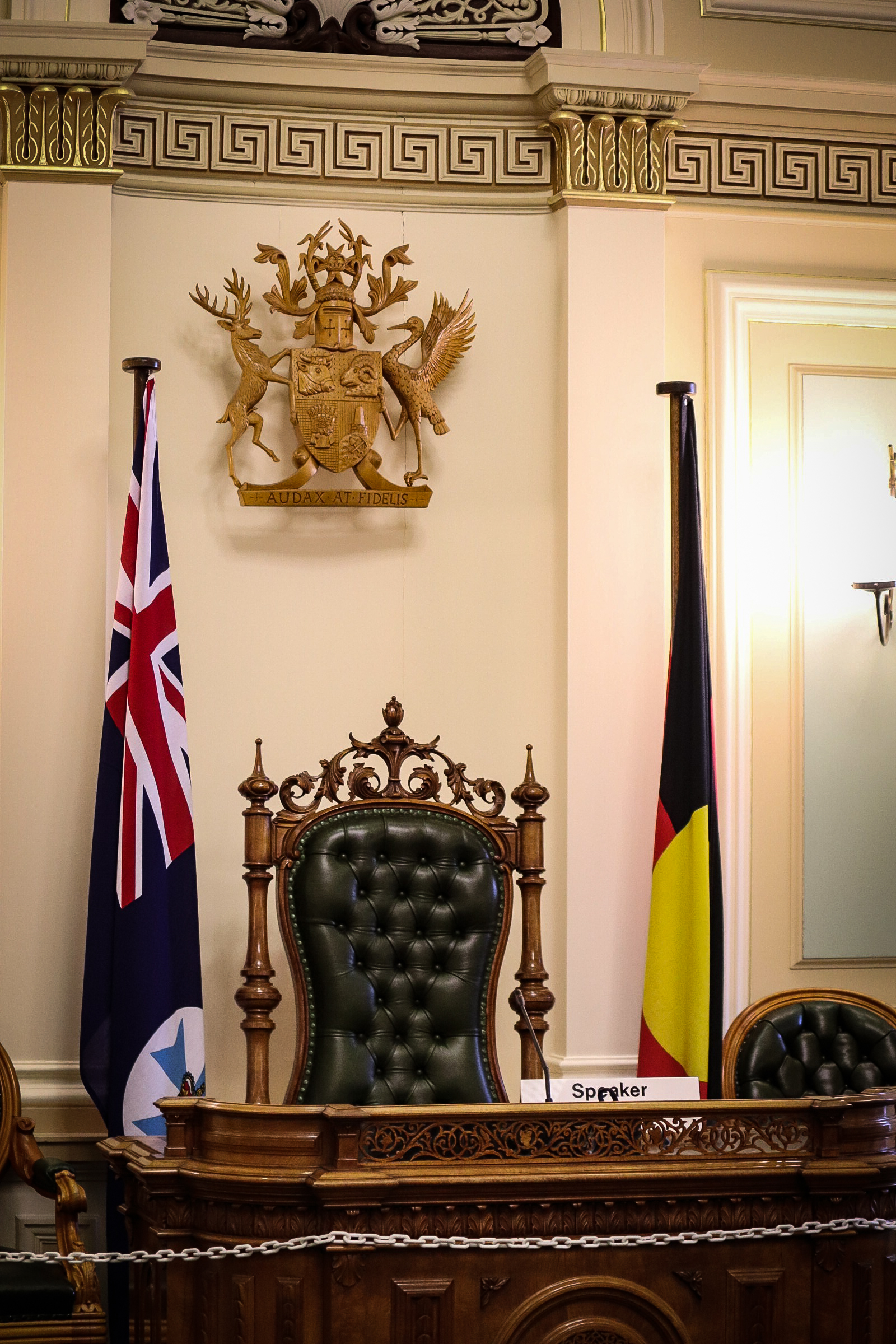
The Speaker's Chair in the Legislative Assembly

A day in Parliament usually begins with housekeeping matters, including prayers, notifications and the tabling of any documents. An opportunity is then given to Ministers to make statements. During a period of no more than an hour, known as question time, any member may pose a question to a Minister.

== Regional sittings ==
Starting in 2002, the Queensland Parliament has held regional sittings of parliament across the state. Originally being held every three years, the occurrence has become more sporadic. The most recent was in 2023 in Cairns, the first regional sitting since the COVID-19 pandemic.

No.	Location	Dates	Venue	Region
1	Townsville	3–5 September 2002	Townsville Entertainment and Convention Centre	North Queensland
2	Rockhampton	4–6 October 2005	Pilbeam Theatre	Central Queensland
3	Cairns	28–30 October 2008	Cairns Convention Centre	Far North Queensland
4	Mackay	24–26 May 2011	Mackay Entertainment and Convention Centre	Mackay, Isaac and Whitsunday
5	Townsville	3–5 September 2019	Townsville Entertainment and Convention Centre	North Queensland
6	Cairns	9–11 May 2023	Cairns Convention Centre	Far North Queensland

== Distribution of seats ==
As of 13 September 2024, the composition of Parliament is:

Party	Seats
Party	Current Assembly (total 93 seats)
Liberal National	53
Labor	36
Katter's Australian	2
Greens	1
Independent	1

- 47 votes as a majority are required to pass legislation.

== Longest-serving members ==
Members of the Queensland Legislative Assembly (directly elected) who served over 30 years.

Name	Photo	Party	Chamber	Start of tenure	End of tenure	Period of service
James Larcombe		Labor	Legislative Assembly	27 April 1912	11 May 1929	41 years, 1 day
James Larcombe		Labor	Legislative Assembly	11 June 1932	19 May 1956	41 years, 1 day
Sir Joh Bjelke-Petersen		Country	Legislative Assembly	3 May 1947	1 December 1987	40 years, 212 days
Thomas Foley		Labor	Legislative Assembly	20 December 1919	28 May 1960	40 years, 160 days
Harry Walker		Country	Legislative Assembly	18 May 1907	3 May 1947	39 years, 350 days
William Groom		Protectionist	Legislative Assembly	11 August 1862	4 June 1901	38 years, 297 days
Sir Frank Nicklin		Country	Legislative Assembly	11 June 1932	13 February 1968	35 years, 247 days
Alf Muller		Country	Legislative Assembly	11 May 1935	17 May 1969	34 years, 6 days
George Barber		Labor	Legislative Assembly	6 July 1901	10 May 1935	33 years, 308 days
Fiona Simpson		LNP	Legislative Assembly	19 September 1992	present	34 years, 63 days
Tom Aikens		North Qld Labor	Legislative Assembly	15 April 1944	12 November 1977	33 years, 211 days
Johnno Mann		Labor	Legislative Assembly	4 April 1936	17 May 1969	33 years, 43 days
Andrew Petrie		Ministerialist	Legislative Assembly	29 April 1893	8 May 1926	33 years, 9 days
Jack Duggan		Labor	Legislative Assembly	14 December 1935	3 August 1957	32 years, 227 days
Jack Duggan		Labor	Legislative Assembly	31 May 1958	17 May 1969	32 years, 227 days
Sir William Knox		Liberal	Legislative Assembly	3 August 1957	2 December 1989	32 years, 121 days
Thomas Dunstan	n/a	Labor	Legislative Assembly	22 May 1915	11 May 1929	31 years, 301 days
Thomas Dunstan	n/a	Labor	Legislative Assembly	11 May 1935	7 March 1953	31 years, 301 days
Ted Walsh		Labor	Legislative Assembly	11 May 1935	3 May 1947	31 years, 18 days
Ted Walsh		Labor	Legislative Assembly	29 April 1950	17 May 1969	31 years, 18 days
Frank Cooper		Labor	Legislative Assembly	22 May 1915	12 March 1946	30 years, 294 days

Members of the nominated Queensland Legislative Council who served over 30 years.

Name	Photo	Party	Chamber	Start of tenure	End of tenure	Period of service
James Cowlishaw		Independent	Legislative Council	18 April 1878	23 March 1922	43 years, 339 days
Frederick Hart		Independent	Legislative Council	11 July 1872	15 July 1915	43 years, 4 days
James Lalor		Independent	Legislative Assembly	5 December 1878	12 May 1888	42 years, 156 days
James Lalor		Independent	Legislative Council	23 August 1888	11 August 1921	42 years, 156 days
John Heussler		Independent	Legislative Council	26 September 1866	8 October 1870	40 years, 338 days
John Heussler		Independent	Legislative Council	13 December 1870	26 October 1907	40 years, 338 days
Andrew Thynne		Independent	Legislative Council	26 January 1882	23 March 1922	40 years, 56 days
William Taylor		Independent	Legislative Council	17 April 1886	23 March 1922	35 years, 340 days
Frederick Brentnall		Independent	Legislative Council	17 April 1886	23 March 1922	35 years, 340 days
John McDougall		Independent	Legislative Council	1 May 1860	13 September 1895	35 years, 135 days
Dr Charles Marks		Independent	Legislative Council	28 November 1888	6 January 1892	33 years, 57 days
Dr Charles Marks		Independent	Legislative Council	11 March 1892	23 March 1922	33 years, 57 days
Peter MacPherson		Independent	Legislative Council	1 July 1881	12 September 1913	32 years, 73 days

== See also ==
- Lists of acts of the Parliament of Queensland
- Parliaments of the Australian states and territories
- Legislative Assembly of Queensland
- List of members of the Queensland Legislative Assembly
