= Electoral results for the district of Archerfield =

Queensland, Australia, district election results

This is a list of electoral results for the electoral district of Archerfield in Queensland state elections.

== Members for Archerfield ==
Member	Party	Term
Kev Hooper	Labor	1972–1984
Henry Palaszczuk	Labor	1984–1992
Len Ardill	Labor	1992–1998
Karen Struthers	Labor	1998–2001

== Election results ==
=== Elections in the 1990s ===
1998 Queensland state election: Archerfield
Party	Candidate	Votes	%	±%
Labor	Karen Struthers	12,453	49.54	−6.57
Liberal	Fazal Deen	6,112	24.31	−19.58
One Nation	Rodger Pryor	5,251	20.89	+20.89
Greens	Rocco De Pierri	826	3.29	+3.29
Reform	Allen Hrstich	497	1.98	+1.98
Total formal votes		25,139	98.33	+0.65
Informal votes		426	1.67	−0.65
Turnout		25,565	94.01	+1.75
Two-party-preferred result
Labor	Karen Struthers	14,278	61.71	+5.60
Liberal	Fazal Deen	8,860	38.29	−5.60
Labor hold		Swing	+5.60	

1995 Queensland state election: Archerfield
Party	Candidate	Votes	%	±%
Labor	Len Ardill	11,794	56.11	−9.08
Liberal	Adam Low	9,224	43.89	+9.08
Total formal votes		21,018	97.68	+0.74
Informal votes		500	2.32	−0.74
Turnout		21,518	92.26	+0.01
Labor hold		Swing	−9.08	

1992 Queensland state election: Archerfield
Party	Candidate	Votes	%	±%
Labor	Len Ardill	12,743	65.2	+1.7
Liberal	Paul Pottinger	6,804	34.8	+9.6
Total formal votes		19,547	96.9	
Informal votes		618	3.1	
Turnout		20,165	92.2	
Labor hold		Swing	+0.9	

=== Elections in the 1980s ===
1989 Queensland state election: Archerfield
Party	Candidate	Votes	%	±%
Labor	Henry Palaszczuk	13,045	73.7	+11.4
Liberal	Gordon Morris	3,082	17.4	+1.0
National	Mark Goodin	1,571	8.9	−12.4
Total formal votes		17,698	95.1	−1.3
Informal votes		922	4.9	+1.3
Turnout		18,620	91.7	+1.0
Two-party-preferred result
Labor	Henry Palaszczuk	13,150	74.3	+7.4
Liberal	Gordon Morris	4,548	25.7	+25.7
Labor hold		Swing	+7.4	

1986 Queensland state election: Archerfield
Party	Candidate	Votes	%	±%
Labor	Henry Palaszczuk	10,277	62.3	−9.3
National	Peter Jorgensen	3,513	21.3	−7.1
Liberal	John Shea	2,699	16.4	+16.4
Total formal votes		16,489	96.4	+0.2
Informal votes		622	3.6	−0.2
Turnout		17,111	90.7	−0.5
Two-party-preferred result
Labor	Henry Palaszczuk	11,031	66.9	−3.6
National	Peter Jorgensen	5,458	33.1	+3.6
Labor hold		Swing	−3.6	

1984 Archerfield state by-election
Party	Candidate	Votes	%	±%
Labor	Henry Palaszczuk	8,641	61.51	−10.13
Liberal	John Shea	2,173	15.47	+15.47
National	Douglas Jackson	1,907	13.57	−14.79
Democrats	David Adams	748	5.32	+5.32
Independent	Bruce Parmenter	456	3.25	+3.25
Independent	Mervyn Clarkson	93	0.66	+0.66
Independent	Norman Eather	31	0.22	+0.22
Total formal votes		14,049	96.54	+0.48
Informal votes		503	3.46	−0.48
Turnout		14,552	82.39	−8.80
Two-party-preferred result
Labor	Henry Palaszczuk	9,373	66.72	−4.92
Liberal	John Shea	4,676	33.28	+33.28
Labor hold		Swing	−4.92	

1983 Queensland state election: Archerfield
Party	Candidate	Votes	%	±%
Labor	Kevin Hooper	10,693	71.6	+6.6
National	Douglas Jackson	4,234	28.4	+12.0
Total formal votes		14,927	96.2	−1.5
Informal votes		597	3.8	+1.5
Turnout		15,524	91.2	+4.4
Labor hold		Swing	+0.5	

1980 Queensland state election: Archerfield
Party	Candidate	Votes	%	±%
Labor	Kevin Hooper	9,335	64.8	−1.9
National	Allen Muir	2,357	16.3	+3.5
Liberal	Alan Bavister	2,167	15.0	−5.6
Pensioner	Miriam Cope	274	1.9	+1.9
Socialist	Mary Simmons	154	1.1	+1.1
Independent	Norman Eather	128	0.9	+0.9
Total formal votes		14,415	97.7	+0.1
Informal votes		334	2.3	−0.1
Turnout		14,749	86.8	−4.0
Two-party-preferred result
Labor	Kevin Hooper	10,255	71.1	+2.7
National	Allen Muir	4,160	28.9	+28.9
Labor hold		Swing	+2.7	

=== Elections in the 1970s ===
1977 Queensland state election: Archerfield
Party	Candidate	Votes	%	±%
Labor	Kevin Hooper	9,651	66.6	+13.1
Liberal	Bevan Fleming	2,989	20.6	−21.7
National	John Armstrong	1,177	8.1	+8.1
National	George Kalaja	683	4.7	+4.7
Total formal votes		14,500	97.6	
Informal votes		357	2.4	
Turnout		14,857	90.8	
Two-party-preferred result
Labor	Kevin Hooper	9,911	68.4	+13.7
Liberal	Bevan Fleming	4,589	31.6	−13.7
Labor hold		Swing	+13.7	

1974 Queensland state election: Archerfield
Party	Candidate	Votes	%	±%
Labor	Kevin Hooper	6,657	53.5	−18.3
Liberal	Garry Hansen	5,260	42.3	+22.9
Queensland Labor	Barry Weedon	371	3.0	−5.8
Socialist	Ivan Ivanoff	157	1.3	+1.3
Total formal votes		12,445	97.3	−0.1
Informal votes		344	2.7	+0.1
Turnout		12,789	87.5	−4.7
Two-party-preferred result
Labor	Kevin Hooper	6,846	55.0	−18.3
Liberal	Garry Hansen	5,599	45.0	+18.3
Labor hold		Swing	−18.3	

1972 Queensland state election: Archerfield
Party	Candidate	Votes	%	±%
Labor	Kevin Hooper	8,075	71.8	
Liberal	Cyril Morgan	2,179	19.4	
Queensland Labor	Barry Weedon	933	8.8	
Total formal votes		11,247	97.4	
Informal votes		294	2.6	
Turnout		11,541	92.2	
Two-party-preferred result
Labor	Kevin Hooper	8,243	73.3	+1.8
Liberal	Cyril Morgan	3,004	26.7	−1.8
Labor hold		Swing	+1.8	
