= Electoral results for the district of Algester =

Queensland, Australia, district election results

This is a list of electoral results for the electoral district of Algester in Queensland state elections.

== Members for Algester ==
Member	Party	Term
Karen Struthers	Labor	2001–2012
Anthony Shorten	Liberal National	2012–2015
Leeanne Enoch	Labor	2015–present

== Election results ==
=== Elections in the 2020s ===
2024 Queensland state election: Algester
Party	Candidate	Votes	%	±%
Labor	Leeanne Enoch	15,463	45.81	−13.11
Liberal National	Jitendra Prasad	10,871	32.21	+6.87
Greens	Andrea Wildin	3,219	9.54	+1.05
One Nation	George Maris	1,603	4.75	−2.5
Independent KAP	Rhys Bosley	1,560	4.62	+4.62
Family First	Jane Turner	1,035	3.07	+3.07
Total formal votes		33,751	95.38	−0.39
Informal votes		1,636	4.62	0.39
Turnout		35,387	87.94	+0.32
Two-party-preferred result
Labor	Leeanne Enoch	19,398	57.47	−10.3
Liberal National	Jitendra Prasad	14,353	42.53	+10.3
Labor hold		Swing	-10.3	

2020 Queensland state election: Algester
Party	Candidate	Votes	%	±%
Labor	Leeanne Enoch	17,452	58.92	+7.00
Liberal National	Nerissa Aitken	7,505	25.34	+3.65
Greens	Josie Mira	2,514	8.49	+0.29
One Nation	Wayne Stacey	2,147	7.25	−10.95
Total formal votes		29,618	96.29	+1.53
Informal votes		1,142	3.71	−1.53
Turnout		30,760	87.62	+0.47
Two-party-preferred result
Labor	Leeanne Enoch	20,073	67.77	+3.35
Liberal National	Nerissa Aitken	9,545	32.23	−3.35
Labor hold		Swing	+3.35	

=== Elections in the 2010s ===
2017 Queensland state election: Algester
Party	Candidate	Votes	%	±%
Labor	Leeanne Enoch	14,424	51.9	+0.3
Liberal National	Clinton Pattison	6,025	21.7	−15.1
One Nation	Darryl Lanyon	5,055	18.2	+18.2
Greens	Patsy O'Brien	2,277	8.2	+1.2
Total formal votes		27,781	94.8	−2.8
Informal votes		1,537	5.2	+2.8
Turnout		29,318	87.1	−1.2
Two-party-preferred result
Labor	Leeanne Enoch	17,898	64.4	+4.8
Liberal National	Clinton Pattison	9,883	35.6	−4.8
Labor hold		Swing	+4.8	

2015 Queensland state election: Algester
Party	Candidate	Votes	%	±%
Labor	Leeanne Enoch	14,089	49.56	+15.71
Liberal National	Anthony Shorten	11,247	39.56	−11.16
Greens	Susan Wolf	2,056	7.23	+0.28
Independent	Kevin Forshaw	1,037	3.65	+3.65
Total formal votes		28,429	97.67	+0.34
Informal votes		679	2.33	−0.34
Turnout		29,108	90.55	−2.27
Two-party-preferred result
Labor	Leeanne Enoch	15,594	56.99	+16.14
Liberal National	Anthony Shorten	11,770	43.01	−16.14
Labor gain from Liberal National		Swing	+16.14	

2012 Queensland state election: Algester
Party	Candidate	Votes	%	±%
Liberal National	Anthony Shorten	13,687	50.72	+15.22
Labor	Karen Struthers	9,134	33.85	−18.78
Katter's Australian	Gavan Duffy	2,286	8.47	+8.47
Greens	Justin Kerr	1,877	6.96	−0.47
Total formal votes		26,984	97.33	−0.38
Informal votes		740	2.67	+0.38
Turnout		27,724	92.82	+0.99
Two-party-preferred result
Liberal National	Anthony Shorten	14,735	59.15	+18.36
Labor	Karen Struthers	10,177	40.85	−18.36
Liberal National gain from Labor		Swing	+18.36	

=== Elections in the 2000s ===
2009 Queensland state election: Algester
Party	Candidate	Votes	%	±%
Labor	Karen Struthers	13,600	52.6	−8.2
Liberal National	Anthony Shorten	9,174	35.5	+7.4
Greens	Stan Cajdler	1,920	7.4	−1.9
Family First	Steve Christian	1,147	4.4	+2.7
Total formal votes		25,841	97.7	−0.1
Informal votes		606	2.3	+0.1
Turnout		26,447	91.8	
Two-party-preferred result
Labor	Karen Struthers	14,451	59.2	−8.6
Liberal National	Anthony Shorten	9,956	40.8	+8.6
Labor hold		Swing	−8.6	

2006 Queensland state election: Algester
Party	Candidate	Votes	%	±%
Labor	Karen Struthers	17,578	62.0	+1.1
Liberal	William Tan	8,124	28.6	+1.0
Greens	Gary Crocker	2,669	9.4	+3.4
Total formal votes		28,371	98.0	+0.3
Informal votes		574	2.0	−0.3
Turnout		28,945	91.8	−0.7
Two-party-preferred result
Labor	Karen Struthers	18,420	67.8	−0.2
Liberal	William Tan	8,732	32.2	+0.2
Labor hold		Swing	−0.2	

2004 Queensland state election: Algester
Party	Candidate	Votes	%	±%
Labor	Karen Struthers	16,102	60.9	−5.8
Liberal	Richard Bradley	7,303	27.6	+4.9
Greens	Gary Crocker	1,587	6.0	+6.0
One Nation	Dale Barnard	1,433	5.4	+5.4
Total formal votes		26,425	97.7	+0.3
Informal votes		621	2.3	−0.3
Turnout		27,046	92.5	−1.2
Two-party-preferred result
Labor	Karen Struthers	16,989	68.0	−4.6
Liberal	Richard Bradley	8,006	32.0	+4.6
Labor hold		Swing	−4.6	

2001 Queensland state election: Algester
Party	Candidate	Votes	%	±%
Labor	Karen Struthers	15,709	66.7	+18.7
Liberal	Michele Cole	5,343	22.7	−3.0
Independent	Brian Watt	1,575	6.7	+6.7
Christian Democrats	Andrew Lamb	919	3.9	+3.9
Total formal votes		23,546	97.4	
Informal votes		632	2.6	
Turnout		24,178	93.7	
Two-party-preferred result
Labor	Karen Struthers	16,140	72.6	+12.5
Liberal	Michele Cole	6,082	27.4	−12.5
Labor hold		Swing	+12.5	
