= Palaszczuk =

Palaszczuk is a Polish-language rendering of the Belarusian surname "Паляшчук" (Paliaščuk, Palyashchuk, Paliashchuk), literally meaning "poleszuk". Notable people with the surname include:

- Annastacia Palaszczuk (born 1969), Australian politician
- Henry Palaszczuk (born 1947), Australian politician

== See also ==
- Polishchuk (surname)
- Poleshchuk (surname)
- Poliszczuk (surname)
