= Tutejsi =

Tutejsi may refer to:

- Poleszuk, the people inhabiting Polesia
- Tutejszy, a self-identification translated as 'local' or 'from here', used in Poland, Ukraine, Belarus, and Lithuania
