= Polishchuk (surname) =

Polishchuk is a Ukrainian-language toponymic surname associated with the area of Polissya and the Polishchuks people who live in the area. Notable people with the surname include:

- Anatoliy Polishchuk (1950–2016), Ukrainian volleyball player
- Fyodor Polishchuk (born 1979), Kazakhstani professional ice hockey player
- Dmitry Polishchuk (born 1987), Russian windsurfer
- Kateryna Polishchuk (born 2001), Ukrainian singer, playwright, and paramedic
- Lyubov Polishchuk (born 1949–2006), Soviet Russian actress
- Mikhail Polischuk (born 1989), Russian swimmer
- Sofia Polishchuk (born 2001), Russian competitive ice dancer
- Valerian Polishchuk (1897–1937), Ukrainian author
- Victor Polishchuk (born 1976), Ukrainian businessman
- Yuliya Polishchuk (born 1983), Ukrainian artist

== See also ==
- Poleshchuk (surname), Russian equivalent
- Palaszczuk (surname), Belarusian equivalent in Polish transcription
- Poliszczuk (surname), this surname in Polish transcription
