= 1984 Archerfield state by-election =

A by-election was held in the Legislative Assembly of Queensland seat of Archerfield on 19 May 1984. It was triggered by the death of sitting Labor member Kevin Hooper on 9 March 1984.

The seat was retained by the Labor Party with the election of candidate Henry Palaszczuk.

The only surprise in the result was the relatively strong showing of the Liberal Party compared to the National Party. Both the Labor and National parties had problems during the campaign, the former with factional feuding over candidate selection, and the Nationals with a candidate who seemed unsure whether his loyalties were to his own party or to Labor.

== Results ==
Archerfield state by-election, 1984
Party	Candidate	Votes	%	±%
Labor	Henry Palaszczuk	8,641	61.51	–10.12
Liberal	John Shea	2,173	15.47	+15.47
National	Doug Jackson	1,796	12.78	–15.59
Democrats	David Adams	748	5.32	+5.32
Independent	Bruce Parmenter	456	3.25	+3.25
Independent	Mervyn Clarkson	93	0.66	+0.66
Independent	Norman Eather	31	0.22	+0.22
Total formal votes		14,049	96.54	+0.39
Informal votes		503	3.46	–0.39
Turnout		14,552	82.39	–8.80
Labor hold		Swing	N/A	

== See also ==
- List of Queensland state by-elections
