= Poleshchuk (surname) =

Poleshchuk or Poleschuk is a Russian-language toponymic surname associated with the area of Polissya and the Polishchuks people who live in the area.

The Ukrainian equivalent is Polishchuk, Belarusian: Palyashchuk, Polish: Poliszczuk, Belarusian in Polish transcription: Palaszczuk.

Notable people with the surname include:

- Anton Poleschuk
- Aleksandr Poleshchuk
- Daniel Poleshchuk (born 1996), Israeli squash player
- Leonid Poleshchuk
