= Poliszczuk (surname) =

Poliszczuk is a Polish-language rendering of the Ukrainian surname Polishchuk, literally meaning "poleshuk". Notable people with the surname include:

- Wiktor Poliszczuk, Polish-Ukrainian-Canadian political scientist
- Afanasij Poliszczuk, Ukrainian Soviet military officer who served in Poland

== See also ==
- Poleshchuk (surname), Russian equivalent
- Palaszczuk (surname), Belarusian equivalent in Polish transcription
