= Electoral results for the district of Inala =

Results of state elections in Queensland

This is a list of electoral results for the electoral district of Inala in Queensland state elections.

== Members for Inala ==
| Member | Party | Term |
|---|---|---|
| Henry Palaszczuk | Labor | 1992–2006 |
| Annastacia Palaszczuk | Labor | 2006–2024 |
| Margie Nightingale | Labor | 2024–present |

== Election results ==
=== Elections in the 2020s ===
==== 2024 ====
2024 Queensland state election: Inala
| Party | Candidate | Votes | % | ±% |
|---|---|---|---|---|
| Labor | Margie Nightingale | 15,227 | 47.13 | −20.29 |
| Liberal National | Trang Yen | 9,104 | 28.18 | +11.64 |
| Greens | Linh Nguyen | 3,925 | 12.15 | +4.44 |
| Independent | Kieu Oanh Do | 1,495 | 4.63 | +4.63 |
| One Nation | Carl Cassin | 1,386 | 4.29 | −0.26 |
| Animal Justice | Van Tuan Andy Nguyen | 1,168 | 3.62 | +3.62 |
| Total formal votes | | 32,305 | 95.19 | +0.09 |
| Informal votes | | 1,632 | 4.81 | −0.09 |
| Turnout | | 33,937 | 86.80 | −0.05 |
Two-party-preferred result
| Labor | Margie Nightingale | 20,235 | 62.64 | −15.53 |
| Liberal National | Trang Yen | 12,070 | 37.36 | +15.53 |
| Labor hold | | Swing | −15.53 | |

==== 2024 by-election ====
2024 Inala state by-election
| Party | Candidate | Votes | % | ±% |
|---|---|---|---|---|
| Labor | Margie Nightingale | 10,216 | 37.23 | −30.19 |
| Liberal National | Trang Yen | 8,059 | 29.37 | +12.83 |
| Greens | Navdeep Singh Sidhu | 2,790 | 10.17 | +2.46 |
| Independent | Linh Nguyen | 2,502 | 9.12 | +9.12 |
| Independent | Nayda Hernandez | 1,320 | 4.81 | +4.81 |
| Legalise Cannabis | Nigel Quinlan | 1,046 | 3.81 | +1.32 |
| Independent Democrat | Chris Simpson | 986 | 3.60 | +3.60 |
| Independent Progressives | Edward Carroll | 519 | 1.89 | +1.89 |
| Total formal votes | | 27,438 | 91.26 | −3.84 |
| Informal votes | | 2,627 | 8.74 | +3.84 |
| Turnout | | 30,065 | 77.35 | −9.50 |
Two-party-preferred result
| Labor | Margie Nightingale | 15,544 | 56.65 | −21.52 |
| Liberal National | Trang Yen | 11,894 | 43.35 | +21.52 |
| Labor hold | | Swing | −21.52 | |

==== 2020 ====
2020 Queensland state election: Inala
| Party | Candidate | Votes | % | ±% |
|---|---|---|---|---|
| Labor | Annastacia Palaszczuk | 19,888 | 67.42 | −0.54 |
| Liberal National | Miljenka Perovic | 4,879 | 16.54 | −4.15 |
| Greens | Peter Murphy | 2,275 | 7.71 | −3.63 |
| One Nation | Scott Reid | 1,341 | 4.55 | +4.55 |
| Legalise Cannabis | Nigel Quinlan | 734 | 2.49 | +2.49 |
| Independent | Terry Jones | 197 | 0.67 | +0.67 |
| Civil Liberties & Motorists | Michael Vidal | 183 | 0.62 | +0.62 |
| Total formal votes | | 29,497 | 95.10 | +2.25 |
| Informal votes | | 1,521 | 4.90 | −2.25 |
| Turnout | | 31,018 | 86.85 | +0.27 |
Two-party-preferred result
| Labor | Annastacia Palaszczuk | 23,057 | 78.17 | +2.07 |
| Liberal National | Miljenka Perovic | 6,440 | 21.83 | −2.07 |
| Labor hold | | Swing | +2.07 | |

=== Elections in the 2010s ===
2017 Queensland state election: Inala
| Party | Candidate | Votes | % | ±% |
|---|---|---|---|---|
| Labor | Annastacia Palaszczuk | 18,558 | 68.0 | +3.7 |
| Liberal National | Leanne McFarlane | 5,651 | 20.7 | −7.0 |
| Greens | Nav Singh Sidhu | 3,097 | 11.3 | +3.9 |
| Total formal votes | | 27,306 | 92.8 | −5.1 |
| Informal votes | | 2,105 | 7.2 | +5.1 |
| Turnout | | 29,411 | 86.6 | +0.8 |
Two-party-preferred result
| Labor | Annastacia Palaszczuk | 20,778 | 76.1 | +5.5 |
| Liberal National | Leanne McFarlane | 6,528 | 23.9 | −5.5 |
| Labor hold | | Swing | +5.5 | |

2015 Queensland state election: Inala
| Party | Candidate | Votes | % | ±% |
|---|---|---|---|---|
| Labor | Annastacia Palaszczuk | 18,915 | 68.46 | +22.24 |
| Liberal National | Adam Hannant | 6,442 | 23.32 | −11.74 |
| Greens | Silke Volkmann | 2,272 | 8.22 | +1.01 |
| Total formal votes | | 27,629 | 97.76 | +0.76 |
| Informal votes | | 632 | 2.24 | −0.76 |
| Turnout | | 28,261 | 89.67 | −1.29 |
Two-party-preferred result
| Labor | Annastacia Palaszczuk | 20,271 | 75.12 | +18.22 |
| Liberal National | Adam Hannant | 6,715 | 24.88 | −18.22 |
| Labor hold | | Swing | +18.22 | |

2012 Queensland state election: Inala
| Party | Candidate | Votes | % | ±% |
|---|---|---|---|---|
| Labor | Annastacia Palaszczuk | 12,016 | 46.22 | −17.73 |
| Liberal National | Joanna Lindgren | 9,115 | 35.06 | +11.34 |
| Katter's Australian | Ashley Dodd | 2,993 | 11.51 | +11.51 |
| Greens | Michael Quall | 1,874 | 7.21 | −0.82 |
| Total formal votes | | 25,998 | 97.01 | −0.63 |
| Informal votes | | 802 | 2.99 | +0.63 |
| Turnout | | 26,800 | 90.96 | −0.60 |
Two-party-preferred result
| Labor | Annastacia Palaszczuk | 13,410 | 56.90 | −14.63 |
| Liberal National | Joanna Lindgren | 10,159 | 43.10 | +14.63 |
| Labor hold | | Swing | −14.63 | |

=== Elections in the 2000s ===
2009 Queensland state election: Inala
| Party | Candidate | Votes | % | ±% |
|---|---|---|---|---|
| Labor | Annastacia Palaszczuk | 16,746 | 64.0 | −5.3 |
| Liberal National | Leo Perkins | 6,212 | 23.7 | +2.8 |
| Greens | Alan Maizey | 2,104 | 8.0 | −1.7 |
| Family First | Felicity Ryan | 1,124 | 4.3 | +4.3 |
| Total formal votes | | 26,186 | 97.5 | |
| Informal votes | | 633 | 2.5 | |
| Turnout | | 26,819 | 91.6 | |
Two-party-preferred result
| Labor | Annastacia Palaszczuk | 17,779 | 71.5 | −4.5 |
| Liberal National | Leo Perkins | 7,077 | 28.5 | +4.5 |
| Labor hold | | Swing | −4.5 | |

2006 Queensland state election: Inala
| Party | Candidate | Votes | % | ±% |
|---|---|---|---|---|
| Labor | Annastacia Palaszczuk | 15,417 | 69.1 | +0.9 |
| Liberal | Peter Matic | 4,558 | 20.4 | +7.1 |
| Greens | Bob East | 2,327 | 10.4 | +4.5 |
| Total formal votes | | 22,302 | 97.5 | +0.2 |
| Informal votes | | 568 | 2.5 | −0.2 |
| Turnout | | 22,870 | 91.3 | +0.2 |
Two-party-preferred result
| Labor | Annastacia Palaszczuk | 16,223 | 76.3 | −4.7 |
| Liberal | Peter Matic | 5,028 | 23.7 | +4.7 |
| Labor hold | | Swing | −4.7 | |

2004 Queensland state election: Inala
| Party | Candidate | Votes | % | ±% |
|---|---|---|---|---|
| Labor | Henry Palaszczuk | 14,865 | 68.2 | +0.1 |
| Liberal | Christopher Cramond | 2,911 | 13.3 | +3.0 |
| One Nation | George Pugh | 2,107 | 9.7 | +9.7 |
| Greens | Nigel Quinlan | 1,296 | 5.9 | +5.9 |
| Independent | Adrian Skerritt | 633 | 2.9 | +2.9 |
| Total formal votes | | 21,812 | 97.3 | −0.2 |
| Informal votes | | 611 | 2.7 | +0.2 |
| Turnout | | 22,423 | 91.1 | −2.4 |
Two-party-preferred result
| Labor | Henry Palaszczuk | 16,192 | 81.0 | +9.5 |
| Liberal | Christopher Cramond | 3,793 | 19.0 | +19.0 |
| Labor hold | | Swing | +9.5 | |

2001 Queensland state election: Inala
| Party | Candidate | Votes | % | ±% |
|---|---|---|---|---|
| Labor | Henry Palaszczuk | 14,434 | 68.1 | +2.3 |
| Independent | George Pugh | 4,585 | 21.6 | +21.6 |
| Liberal | Marie Jackson | 2,180 | 10.3 | −7.1 |
| Total formal votes | | 21,199 | 97.5 | |
| Informal votes | | 551 | 2.5 | |
| Turnout | | 21,750 | 93.5 | |
Two-candidate-preferred result
| Labor | Henry Palaszczuk | 14,606 | 71.5 | −5.0 |
| Independent | George Pugh | 5,836 | 28.5 | +28.5 |
| Labor hold | | Swing | −5.0 | |

=== Elections in the 1990s ===
1998 Queensland state election: Inala
| Party | Candidate | Votes | % | ±% |
|---|---|---|---|---|
| Labor | Henry Palaszczuk | 12,748 | 67.1 | −1.8 |
| Liberal | Philip Greenaway | 3,253 | 17.1 | −14.0 |
| Democrats | Lin Dengate | 1,618 | 8.5 | +5.8 |
| Greens | Lenore Taylor | 1,020 | 5.4 | +5.4 |
| Independent | Xuan Nguyen | 373 | 2.0 | +2.0 |
| Total formal votes | | 19,012 | 96.6 | −0.4 |
| Informal votes | | 674 | 3.4 | +0.4 |
| Turnout | | 19,686 | 92.8 | −1.4 |
Two-party-preferred result
| Labor | Henry Palaszczuk | 14,015 | 77.4 | +8.5 |
| Liberal | Philip Greenaway | 4,094 | 22.6 | −8.5 |
| Labor hold | | Swing | +8.5 | |

1995 Queensland state election: Inala
| Party | Candidate | Votes | % | ±% |
|---|---|---|---|---|
| Labor | Henry Palaszczuk | 12,894 | 68.9 | −3.3 |
| Liberal | Andrew Rowland | 5,830 | 31.1 | +12.7 |
| Total formal votes | | 18,724 | 97.0 | +0.1 |
| Informal votes | | 583 | 3.0 | −0.1 |
| Turnout | | 19,307 | 91.4 | |
| Labor hold | | Swing | −7.6 | |

1992 Queensland state election: Inala
| Party | Candidate | Votes | % | ±% |
|---|---|---|---|---|
| Labor | Henry Palaszczuk | 14,070 | 72.2 | −0.6 |
| Liberal | Charles Perry | 3,586 | 18.4 | −4.2 |
| Indigenous Peoples | Norma James | 1,835 | 9.4 | +9.4 |
| Total formal votes | | 19,491 | 96.9 | |
| Informal votes | | 630 | 3.1 | |
| Turnout | | 20,121 | 91.0 | |
Two-party-preferred result
| Labor | Henry Palaszczuk | 14,546 | 76.4 | +3.2 |
| Liberal | Charles Perry | 4,486 | 23.6 | −3.2 |
| Labor hold | | Swing | +3.2 | |
