= Podlachians =

Podlasianie (Polish)

Regions with significant populations
- Podlaskie and Lublin Voivodeships, Poland

Languages
- Polish

Religion
- Roman Catholicism

Related ethnic groups
- Poles, Mazovians, Podlashuks

Podlachians, (Note: Polish: Podlasianie, Podlaszanie) also known as Podlachian Masurians, (Note: Polish: Mazurzy podlascy) are an ethnographic group of Polish people that inhabit an area of Podlachia in Poland, including Podlaskie and Lublin Voivodeships.

== History ==
They originated from Mazovia and in are descendants of Masovians who between 13th and 15th century had colonised area around the Bug river, mixing with the population of Ruthenians already present in the area.

== Citations ==
=== Bibliography ===
- Encyklopedia powszechna PWN, vol. 3, edition 3. Warsaw. PWN. 1985. ISBN 83-01-00003-1.
