= Belarusians =

East Slavic ethnic group native to Belarus

Belarusian: Беларусы

Total population
- c. 9 million

Regions with significant populations
- Belarus 7.99 million
- United States (Belarusian ancestry): 155,000 - 600,000
- Russia: 521,443 (2010)
- Ukraine: 275,763 (2001)
- Kazakhstan: 76,484 (2021)
- Germany: 61,000
- Poland: 56,607 (2021)
- Latvia: 55,929 (2023)
- Czech Republic: 31,000
- Lithuania: 28,183
- Moldova: 20,000
- Canada: 15,565
- Brazil: 12,100
- Estonia: 11,828 (2017)
- Italy: 8,529
- France: 7,500
- United Kingdom: 7,000
- Uruguay: 7,000
- Spain: 5,828
- Turkey: 4,207
- Sweden: 2,833
- Norway: 2,015
- Turkmenistan: 2,000
- Belgium: 2,000
- Australia: 1,560 (2006)
- Denmark: 1,268
- Greece: 1,168
- Portugal: 1,002 (2009)
- Bulgaria: 1,000
- Netherlands: 973 (2016)
- Slovakia: c. 500 (2021)
- Austria: below 500

Languages
- Belarusian (historical and native); Russian (dominant); Trasianka

Religion
- Orthodox Christianity (majority), Roman Catholicism, Belarusian Greek Catholicism, Irreligion (minority)

Related ethnic groups
- Other East Slavs (Poleshuks, Podlashuks, Russians, Ukrainians)

Belarusians (Belarusian: беларусы, romanized: biełarusy [bʲeɫaˈrusɨ]) are an East Slavic ethnic group native to Belarus. They share a common culture, ancestry, history, and traditionally speak the Belarusian language. More than 9 million people proclaim Belarusian ethnicity worldwide. Nearly 7.99 million Belarusians reside in Belarus, with the United States and Russia being home to more than 500,000 Belarusians each. The majority of Belarusians adhere to Eastern Orthodoxy.

== Name ==
Upon Belarusian independence in 1991, they became known as Belarusians or Belarusans (from Belarus, derived from "Беларусь"). During the Soviet era, Belarusians were referred to as Byelorussians, Belorussians (from Byelorussia, derived from Russian "Белоруссия") or White Russians (Note: While sometimes historically referred to as Byelorussians, Belorussians and White Russians, they are distinct from Russians themselves). Before, they were typically known as Ruthenians, Litvins and White Ruthenians (from White Ruthenia or White Rus', based on "Белая Русь").

The term White Rus' (Белая Русь, Biełaja Ruś), also known as White Ruthenia or White Russia (as the term Rus' is often conflated with its Latin forms Ruthenia and Russia), was first used in the Middle Ages to refer to the area of Polotsk. The name Rus' itself is derived from the Rus' people which gave the name to the territories of Kievan Rus'. The chronicles of Jan of Czarnków mention the imprisonment of Lithuanian grand duke Jogaila and his mother at "Albae Russiae, Poloczk dicto" in 1381. During the 17th century, the Russian tsars used the term to describe the lands added from the Grand Duchy of Lithuania. However, during the Russian Civil War, the term White Russian became associated with the White movement.

== Geographic distribution ==
Belarusians are an East Slavic ethnic group, who constitute the majority of Belarus' population. Belarusian minority populations live in countries neighboring Belarus: Ukraine, Poland (especially in the Podlaskie Voivodeship), the Russian Federation and Lithuania. At the beginning of the 20th century, Belarusians constituted a minority in the regions around the city of Smolensk in Russia.

Significant numbers of Belarusians emigrated to the United States, Brazil and Canada in the early 20th century. During Soviet times (1917–1991), many Belarusians were deported or migrated to various regions of the USSR, including Siberia, Kazakhstan and Ukraine.

Since the 1991 breakup of the USSR, several hundred thousand Belarusians have emigrated to the Baltic states, the United States, Canada, Russia, and EU countries.

== Languages ==
The two official languages of Belarus are Belarusian and Russian. Russian was made co-official with Belarusian after the 1995 Belarusian referendum, which also established that the flag (with the hammer and sickle removed), anthem, and coat of arms would be those of the BSSR (with some changes). The OSCE Parliamentary Assembly stated that the referendum violated international standards. Members of the opposition claimed that the organization of the referendum involved several serious violations of legislation, including a violation of the constitution.

== Genetics ==
Belarusians, like most Europeans, largely descend from three distinct lineages: Mesolithic hunter-gatherers, descended from a Cro-Magnon population that arrived in Europe about 45,000 years ago; Neolithic farmers who migrated from Asia Minor during the Neolithic Revolution 9,000 years ago; and Yamnaya steppe pastoralists who expanded into Europe from the Pontic–Caspian steppe in the context of Indo-European migrations 5,000 years ago.

== History ==
=== The Neolithic and the Bronze Age ===
Balts have historically inhabited most of the territory of present-day Belarus, particularly The upper Dnieper River basin, Sozh, Berezina, Pripyat, and Western Dvina river regions. Many ancient place names in Belarus are of Baltic origin. These names predate Slavic settlement, showing that Balts lived in these areas before the arrival of Slavs which began around the 6th–7th centuries AD. In Belarus, Balts gradually assimilated into Slavic tribes, especially during the 1st millennium AD.

=== Early Middle Ages ===
Slavic tribes in the 7th-9th century

According to Russian archaeologist Valentin Sedov, intensive contacts with the Balts contributed to the distinctiveness of the Belarusian tribes from the other Eastern Slavs.

The Baltic population gradually became Slavic, undergoing assimilation, a process that for eastern and central Belarus ended around the 12th century. Most of present-day Belarusian lands in the 8th-9th centuries were inhabited by three tribal unions: the Kryvichs, Dryhavichs and Radzimichs. Of these, the Kryvichs played the most important role; Polotsk and Smolensk, founded by them, were the most important cultural and political center during this period. The principalities formed at that time on the territory of Belarus were part of Kievan Rus'.

=== In the Grand Duchy of Lithuania ===
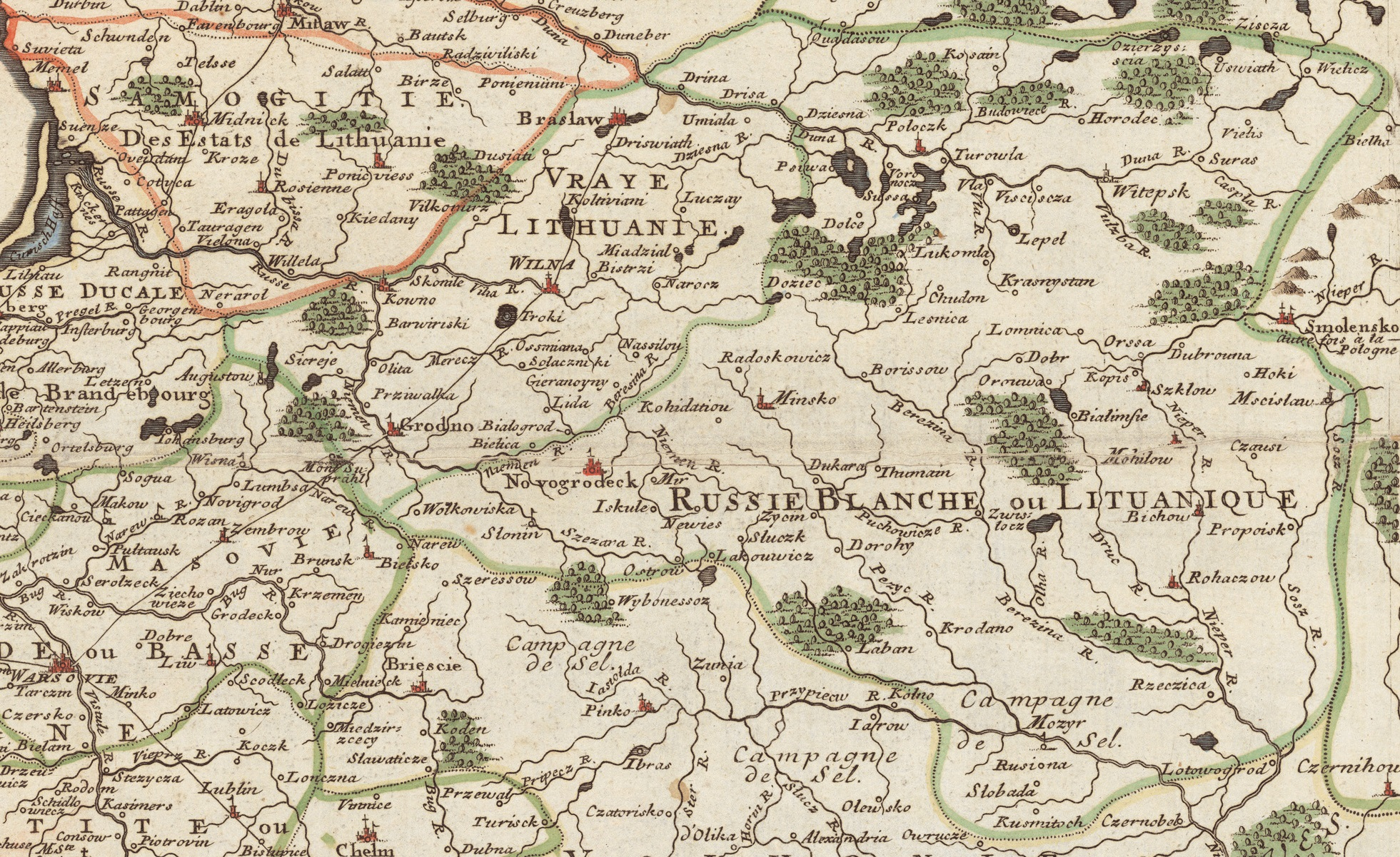
A fragment of an 18th-century map by Nicolas de Fer featuring Samogitia (Samogitie), Lithuania proper (Vraye Lithuanie) and the Belarusian territories of the Grand Duchy of Lithuania (Russie Blanche ou Lituanique)

Over time, East Slavic populations – a part of which today are broadly identified as Belarusians – came to comprise a substantial portion of the Grand Duchy of Lithuania's population, territory, and administrative structure. Beginning with the reigns of monarchs Mindaugas and Gediminas, Lithuania expanded rapidly eastward and southward. By the mid-14th century, most of modern Belarus (including Polotsk, Vitebsk, Minsk, Turov, and Pinsk) were part of the Lithuanian state. These regions were historically part of the Kievan Rus' cultural and political sphere and retained strong Orthodox Christian and East Slavic traditions. Their elites, while politically integrated into the Lithuanian state, continued to identify with the Rus' legacy and maintained local self-governance to varying degrees. The Ruthenian nobility living on modern-day Belarus were full participants in the political life of Lithuania. Many of them were bilingual or trilingual, speaking Ruthenian, Polish, and Latin, and later came under increasing Polish cultural influence, especially after the Union of Lublin in 1569 and the Union of Brest in 1596, which created the Greek Catholics of the Ruthenian Uniate Church. While a modern Belarusian national identity did not yet exist, Lithuania's Ruthenian-speaking population is recognized as the cultural and linguistic ancestors of modern Belarusians. Over the next two centuries, Belarusian lands experienced growing Polonization and religious shifts, although Ruthenian continued to be used in some official contexts until the late 17th century, when it was replaced by Polish.

After the late 18th-century Partitions, most Belarusian territories were annexed by the Russian Empire, where a new phase of identity development, repression, and cultural shifts began.

=== In the Russian Empire ===
Following the destruction of Poland–Lithuania with the Third Partition in 1795, Empress Catherine of Russia created the Belarusian Governorate from the Polotsk and Mogilev Governorates. However, Tsar Nicholas I of Russia banned the use of the word Belarus in 1839, replacing it with the designation Northwestern Krai. Due to the ban, various different names were used for naming the inhabitants of those territories. It was part of the Pale of Settlement, which was the region where Jews were allowed permanent residency.

=== 20th century ===
During World War I and the fall of Russian Empire, a short-lived Belarusian Democratic Republic was declared in March 1918. Thereafter, modern Belarus' territory was split between the Second Polish Republic and Soviet Russia during the Peace of Riga in 1921. The latter created the Belarusian Soviet Socialist Republic, which was reunited with Western Belarus during World War 2 and lasted until the dissolution of the Soviet Union, which was ended by the Belovezha Accords in 1991. The modern Republic of Belarus exists since then.

More than two million people were killed in Belarus during the three years of German occupation in 1941–44, around a quarter of the region's population, or even as high as three million killed or thirty percent of the population.

== See also ==
- List of Belarusians (ethnic group)
- Demographics of Belarus
- Dryhavichs
- Kryvichs
- Radzimichs
- Litvins
- History of Belarus
- Belarusian Americans

== Bibliography ==
- Pankowicz, Andrzej (2004). "Spór o genezę narodu białoruskiego. Perspektywa historyczna" [The dispute over the genesis of the Belarusian nation. A historical perspective]. Krakowskie Studia Międzynarodowe (in Polish). 4: 89–106.
- Plokhy, Serhii (2001). The Cossacks and Religion in Early Modern Ukraine. Oxford University Press. ISBN 0-19-924739-0.
- Savchenko, Andrew (2009). Belarus - A Perpetual Borderland. Leiden-Boston: Brill.
- Shved, Viachaslau; Grzybowski, Jerzy (2020). Historia Białorusi. Od czasów najdawniejszych do roku 1991 [History of Belarus. From the earliest times to 1991] (in Polish). Warsaw: WUW.
- Vauchez, André; Dobson, Richard Barrie; Lapidge, Michael (2001). Encyclopedia of the Middle Ages. Routledge. ISBN 1-57958-282-6.
