= Electoral district of Inala =

State electoral district of Queensland, Australia

Inala Queensland—Legislative Assembly
- Electoral map of Inala, 2017
- State: Queensland
- MP: Margie Nightingale
- Party: Labor
- Namesake: The suburb of Inala
- Electors: 35,716 (2020)
- Area: 52 km^{2} (20.1 sq mi)
- Demographic: Inner-metropolitan
- Coordinates: 27°37′S 152°57′E
Electorates around Inala:
Moggill	Mount Ommaney	Miller
Bundamba	Inala	Algester
Jordan	Jordan	Algester

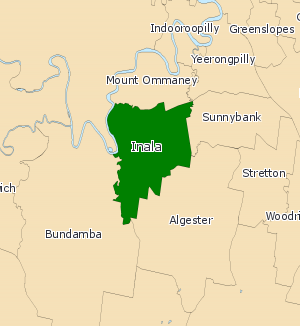
Electoral map of Inala, 2008

Inala is an electoral district of the Legislative Assembly of Queensland in south-west Brisbane. It includes the suburbs of Inala, Ellen Grove, Forest Lake, Doolandella, Durack, Wacol, Richlands and parts of Oxley. It borders the electoral districts of Mount Ommaney, Miller, Algester, Jordan, Bundamba and Moggill.

The Inala electoral district was created in the 1990 redistribution as part of the one vote one value reforms under Wayne Goss, and was contested for the first time at the 1992 election.

For its entire existence, it has been held by the Labor Party. Henry Palaszczuk, the seat's first member, transferred from Archerfield to Inala upon Inala's creation in 1992. He went on to become a senior minister in the Beattie government. Henry retired in 2006 and was succeeded by his daughter and former member, Annastacia Palaszczuk, who was the Premier of Queensland from 2015 to 2023.

For most of its existence, Inala has been a comfortably safe Labor seat, and on several occasions it was the safest Labor seat in the state. The only time the Labor hold on Inala was seriously threatened was in 2012, when Annastacia lost over 17 percent of her primary vote from 2009–to date, the only time that Labor hasn't won the seat outright on the primary vote. She suffered a 14-point two-party swing, reducing her majority to 6.2 percent. Annastacia was elected as leader of what remained of Labor, and led her party back to government in 2015. Along the way, she reverted Inala to its traditional status as a comfortably safe Labor seat; her majority ballooned to 25 percent, the second-safest seat in the entire chamber. She consolidated her majority in 2017 and 2020, and now sits on a majority of 28.1 percent, the safest seat in the state.

== Members for Inala ==
Member	Party	Term
Henry Palaszczuk	Labor	1992–2006
Annastacia Palaszczuk	Labor	2006–2023
Margie Nightingale	Labor	2024-present

== Election results ==
2024 Queensland state election: Inala
Party	Candidate	Votes	%	±%
Labor	Margie Nightingale	15,227	47.13	−20.29
Liberal National	Trang Yen	9,104	28.18	+11.64
Greens	Linh Nguyen	3,925	12.15	+4.44
Independent	Kieu Oanh Do	1,495	4.63	+4.63
One Nation	Carl Cassin	1,386	4.29	−0.26
Animal Justice	Van Tuan Andy Nguyen	1,168	3.62	+3.62
Total formal votes		32,305	95.19	+0.09
Informal votes		1,632	4.81	−0.09
Turnout		33,937	86.80	−0.05
Two-party-preferred result
Labor	Margie Nightingale	20,235	62.64	−15.53
Liberal National	Trang Yen	12,070	37.36	+15.53
Labor hold		Swing	−15.53	

Primary vote results in Inala (Parties that have never gotten 5% of the vote are omitted)
Labor
Liberal/Liberal National
Greens
One Nation
Katter's Australian
Australian Democrats
Indigenous Peoples
Independent
View source data.
Two-candidate-preferred vote results in Inala View source data.
