= Electoral district of Algester =

State electoral district of Queensland, Australia

Algester Queensland—Legislative Assembly
- Map of the electoral district of Algester, 2017
- State: Queensland
- MP: Leeanne Enoch
- Party: Labor
- Namesake: Suburb of Algester
- Electors: 35,108 (2020)
- Area: 66 km^{2} (25.5 sq mi)
- Demographic: Inner-metropolitan
- Coordinates: 27°42′S 152°57′E
Electorates around Algester:
Mount Ommaney	Miller	Toohey
Inala	Algester	Stretton
Jordan	Logan	Woodridge

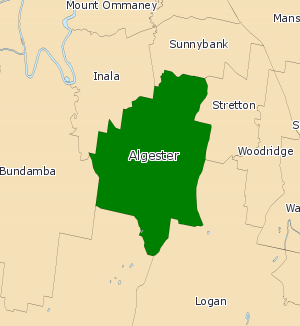
2008 map

The electoral district of Algester is an electoral district of the Legislative Assembly of Queensland in south-west Brisbane. It includes the suburbs of Algester, Parkinson, Hillcrest, Boronia Heights, Forestdale, Larapinta, Heathwood, Forest Lake, Doolandella and Pallara, as well as the Greenbank Military Range. It borders the electoral districts of Sunnybank, Stretton, Logan, Lockyer, Bundamba and Inala.

The Algester electoral district was created at the 1999 redistribution from the former electoral district of Archerfield, and was contested for the first time at the 2001 election. It had been a safe seat for the Labor Party since its inception, as had Archerfield, but it was won by Anthony Shorten of the Liberal National Party at the 2012 election. Leeanne Enoch won the seat back for Labor at the 2015 election. Enoch is the first Indigenous Australian woman elected to the Queensland parliament.

== Members for Algester ==
Member	Party	Term
Karen Struthers	Labor	2001–2012
Anthony Shorten	Liberal National	2012–2015
Leeanne Enoch	Labor	2015–present

== Election results ==
2024 Queensland state election: Algester
Party	Candidate	Votes	%	±%
Labor	Leeanne Enoch	15,463	45.81	−13.11
Liberal National	Jitendra Prasad	10,871	32.21	+6.87
Greens	Andrea Wildin	3,219	9.54	+1.05
One Nation	George Maris	1,603	4.75	−2.5
Independent KAP	Rhys Bosley	1,560	4.62	+4.62
Family First	Jane Turner	1,035	3.07	+3.07
Total formal votes		33,751	95.38	−0.39
Informal votes		1,636	4.62	0.39
Turnout		35,387	87.94	+0.32
Two-party-preferred result
Labor	Leeanne Enoch	19,398	57.47	−10.3
Liberal National	Jitendra Prasad	14,353	42.53	+10.3
Labor hold		Swing	–10.3	

Labor
Liberal/Liberal National
Greens
One Nation
Katter's Australian
Independent
View source data.
View source data.
