= Masovians =

Ethnographic group of Polish people originating from Masovia

Mazowszanie (Polish)
- The flag of the Masovian Voivodeship, Poland

Regions with significant populations
- Poland (Masovian Voivodeship)

Languages
- Polish (Masovian dialect)

Religion
- Roman Catholicism

Related ethnic groups
- Poles, Masurians, Podlachians

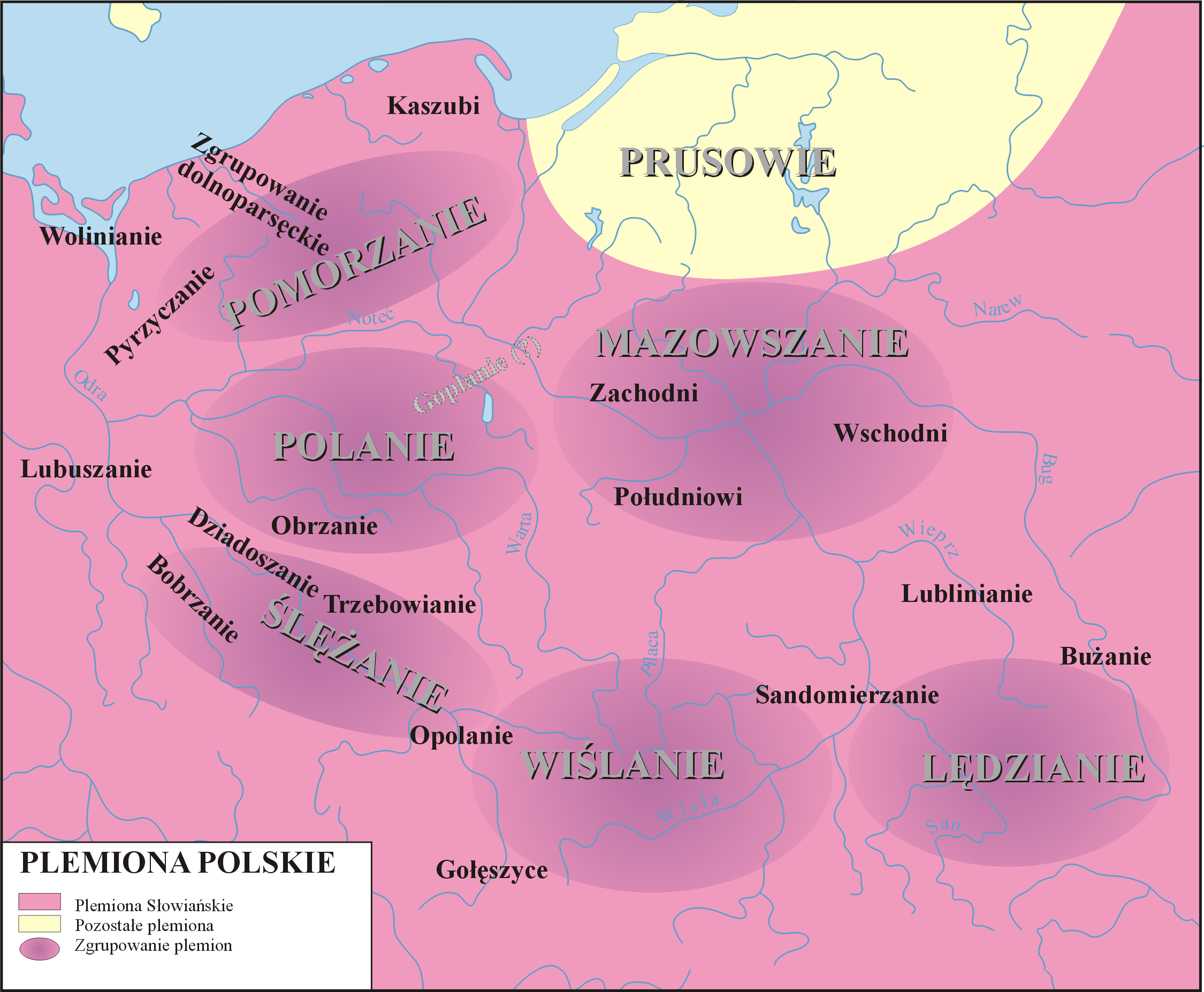
Masovians as Mazowszanie around the mid-Vistula River region

Masovians, (Note: Polish: Mazowszanie [ˈmazɔvˈʂaɲɛ]) also spelled as Mazovians, and historically known as Masurians, (Note: Polish: Mazurzy) is an ethnographic group of Polish people that originates from the region of Masovia, located mostly within borders of the Masovian Voivodeship, Poland. They speak the Masovian dialect of Polish.

The group originates from the Lechitic tribe of Masovians, first referenced in the historical records by Nestor the Chronicler in the 11th century.

In the Polish census of 2021, 97 people declared Mazovian national identity.

== Name ==
The name Masovian, in Polish, Mazowszanin, comes from the name of the region of Masovia, in Polish known as Mazowsze. The name of the region, comes from its Old Polish names Mazow, and Mazosze, and most likely came from word maz (ancestor word of modern maź and mazać), which was used to either describe a "muddy region" or a "person covered in mud".

Historically, prior to the World War II, the population was known as Masurians (Polish: Mazurzy). More recently, that name became associated with a related ethnic group, originating in the nearby region of Masuria proper; the Masurians per se were known, historically, as "Prussian Masurians". In modern usage, the population of Masovia is known exclusively as Masovians.

== History ==
The group originate from the Lechitic tribe of Masovians, first referenced in the historical records by Nestor the Chronicler in the 11th century. The tribe inhabited an area in modern region of Masovia, centered on the Vistula river. They were originally of the Slavic paganism faith, prior to the christianization of Poland, begun in 10th century. The main settlements of the tribes were Ciechanów, Czersk, Łomża, Płock, Płońsk, and Wizna.

== Ethnographic subgroups ==
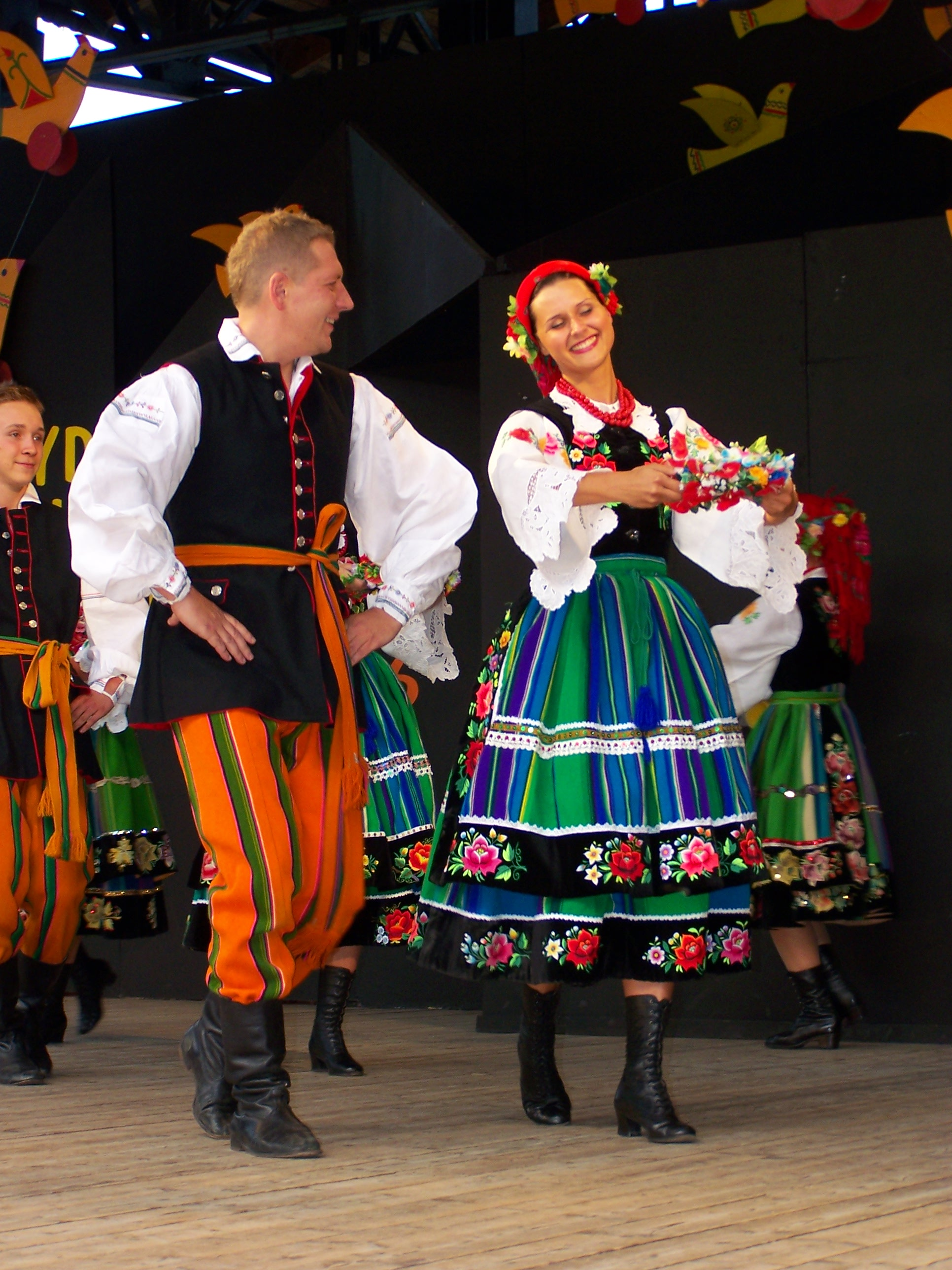
A pair of Łowiczans in traditional regional dress.

There are several subgroups of Masovian people. They include Łowiczans, Poborzans, and Podlachians. Historically, they also included Międzyrzec Boyars.
