= Podlashuks =

East Slavic ethnic group

Пудляшуки
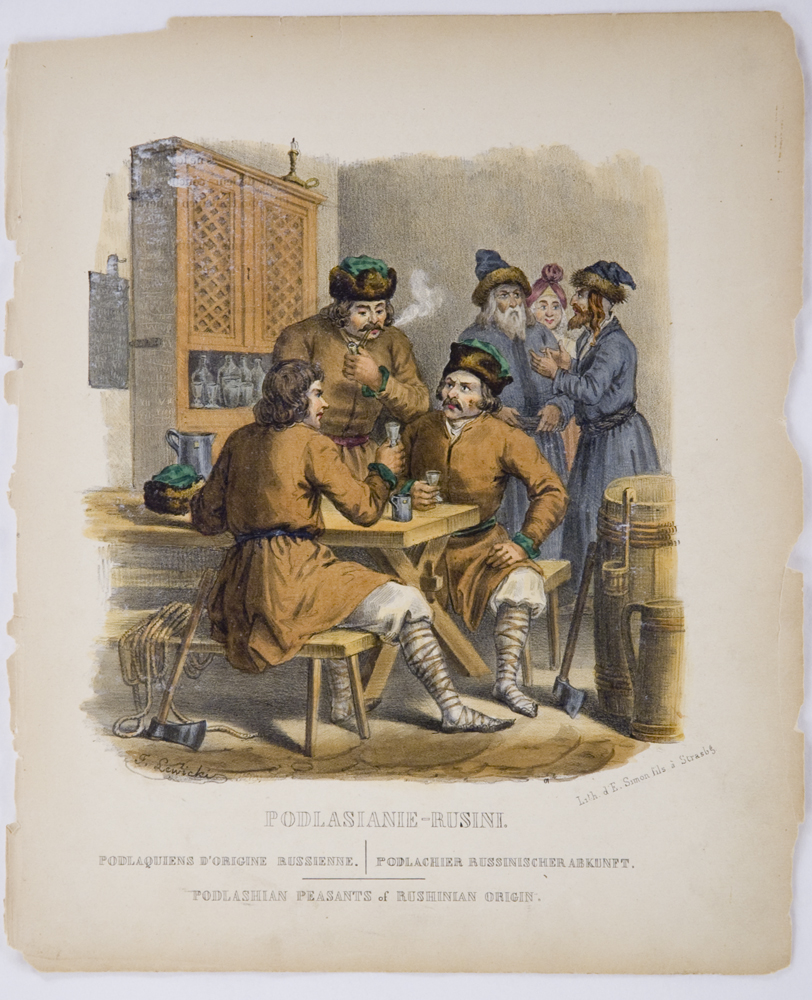
- 19th century painting "Ruthenians from Podlachia" by Jan Lewicki.

Regions with significant populations
- Podlaskie and Lublin Voivodeships, Poland

Languages
- Podlachian (sometimes classified as a subdialect of Ukrainian or Belarusian), Polish

Religion
- Eastern Orthodox, Roman Catholicism

Related ethnic groups
- Belarusians, Ukrainians, Podlachians, Poleshuks

Podlashuks, or Padlashuks (Podlachian: Пудляшуки, romanized: Pudliashuki; Belarusian: Падляшукі, romanized: Padlašuki; Ukrainian: Підляшани, romanized: Pidliashany; Polish: Podlaszucy), are an East Slavic ethnic group from Podlachia, a historical region in northeastern Poland which includes the Podlaskie and Lublin Voivodeships. Some Podlashuks identify as Belarusian, Ukrainian, or Polish, while others identify as a distinct ethnic group.

== Language ==
Podlashuks traditionally speak the Podlachian microlanguage, alternatively classified as the Podlachian subdialect of Northern Ukrainian.

== Religion ==
Podlashuks in northern Podlachia, located within Podlaskie Voivodeship, are mostly Eastern Orthodox, while those in southern Podlachia, in Lublin Voivodeship, are mostly Roman Catholic.
