= Poborzans =

Ethnographic group of Polish people originating from Masovia

Poborzanie (Polish)

Regions with significant populations
- Poland (Masovian Voivodeship)

Languages
- Polish (Masovian dialect)

Religion
- Roman Catholicism

Related ethnic groups
- Poles, Masovians

Poborzans, (Note: Polish: Poborzanie) also spelled as Pobożans, (Note: Polish: Pobożanie) are an ethnographic group of Polish people, that are part of the ethnographic subgroup of Masovians. They originate from the north west Masovia, located within the region of Poborze and Zawkrze, to the north of Mława river. The group is descendant of the Polish nobility that had inhabit the area in the Late Middle Ages. They are culturally separate from the neighbouring groups.
