= Len Ardill =

Australian politician

Member of the Queensland Legislative Assembly for Salisbury
- In office 1 November 1986 – 19 September 1992
- Preceded by: Wayne Goss
- Succeeded by: Seat abolished

Member of the Queensland Legislative Assembly for Archerfield
- In office 19 September 1992 – 13 June 1998
- Preceded by: Henry Palaszczuk
- Succeeded by: Karen Struthers

Personal details
- Born: Leonard Arthur Ardill; 15 March 1931 Brisbane, Queensland, Australia
- Died: 4 April 2014 (aged 83) Queensland, Australia
- Party: Labor

Leonard Arthur Ardill (15 March 1931 – 4 April 2014) was an Australian state politician, representing the Labor.

Following time as an Alderman in the Brisbane City Council, including serving as the Vice Mayor, Ardill was elected in 1986 to the Legislative Assembly of Queensland as the member for Salisbury. He then became the member for Archerfield from 1992 till his retirement in 1998 .

His parliamentary service included time as the Chairman of the Parliamentary Travelsafe Committee and membership of the Parliamentary Public Works Committee.

Ardill died in 2014 and was cremated at Mt Gravatt Crematorium.

Parliament of Queensland
Preceded by Wayne Goss	Member for Salisbury; 1986–1992	Abolished
Preceded by Henry Palaszczuk	Member for Archerfield; 1992–1998	Succeeded by Karen Struthers
