= Kvasha =

Kvasha (Ukrainian: Кваша) is a traditional Ukrainian dish similar to kissel. It is also a gender-neutral Ukrainian surname that may refer to

- Alona Kvasha (born 1984), Ukrainian artistic gymnast
- Igor Kvasha (1933–2012), Soviet and Russian theater and film actor
- Illya Kvasha (born 1988), Ukrainian
- Oleg Kvasha (born 1978), Russian ice hockey forward
