= Kevin Hooper (politician) =

Australian politician

Kev Hooper

Member of the Queensland Parliament for Archerfield
- In office 27 May 1972 – 9 March 1984
- Preceded by: New seat
- Succeeded by: Henry Palaszczuk

Personal details
- Born: 9 July 1928 Brisbane, Australia
- Died: 9 March 1984 (aged 55) The Prince Charles Hospital Chermside, Queensland, Australia
- Resting place: Mt Gravatt Cemetery
- Party: Labor
- Spouse: Beryl Theresa Kelly
- Children: 6
- Occupation: Shop assistant, storeman, trade union official

Kevin Joseph (Kev) Hooper, (9 July 1928 – 9 March 1984), was an Australian politician who represented the Labor Party as a member of the Legislative Assembly of Queensland for the Electoral district of Archerfield from 1972 until his death in 1984.

== Early life ==
Born in Brisbane, Kevin Hooper was the eldest child of labourer George Cyril Hooper and Catherine (née Moriarty). They lived at the Torwood Estate. Kevin attended nearby Rainworth and Milton State schools, as well as Marist Brothers College Rosalie to grade eight level. He married Beryl Kelly in December 1953, and they secured a Queensland Housing Commission rental house at Inala in 1956.

== Political career ==
Hooper became known as 'Buckets' for fearless testing of parliamentary privilege in relation to allegations of corruption, incompetence or maladministration. He was also nicknamed "Big Vinnie" after a notorious Mafia informant due to championing the cause of the underdog and was outspoken against illegal prostitution, drugs, gambling, and white-collar crime.

== Death ==
On 9 March 1984, Hooper died after Hodgkin's disease surgery at The Prince Charles Hospital in suburban Chermside, Queensland. He was buried in the Mount Gravatt Cemetery.

== Legacy ==
Hooper is remembered at Inala by Kev Hooper Park, and at Acacia Ridge by the Kev Hooper Bridge on Learoyd Road.

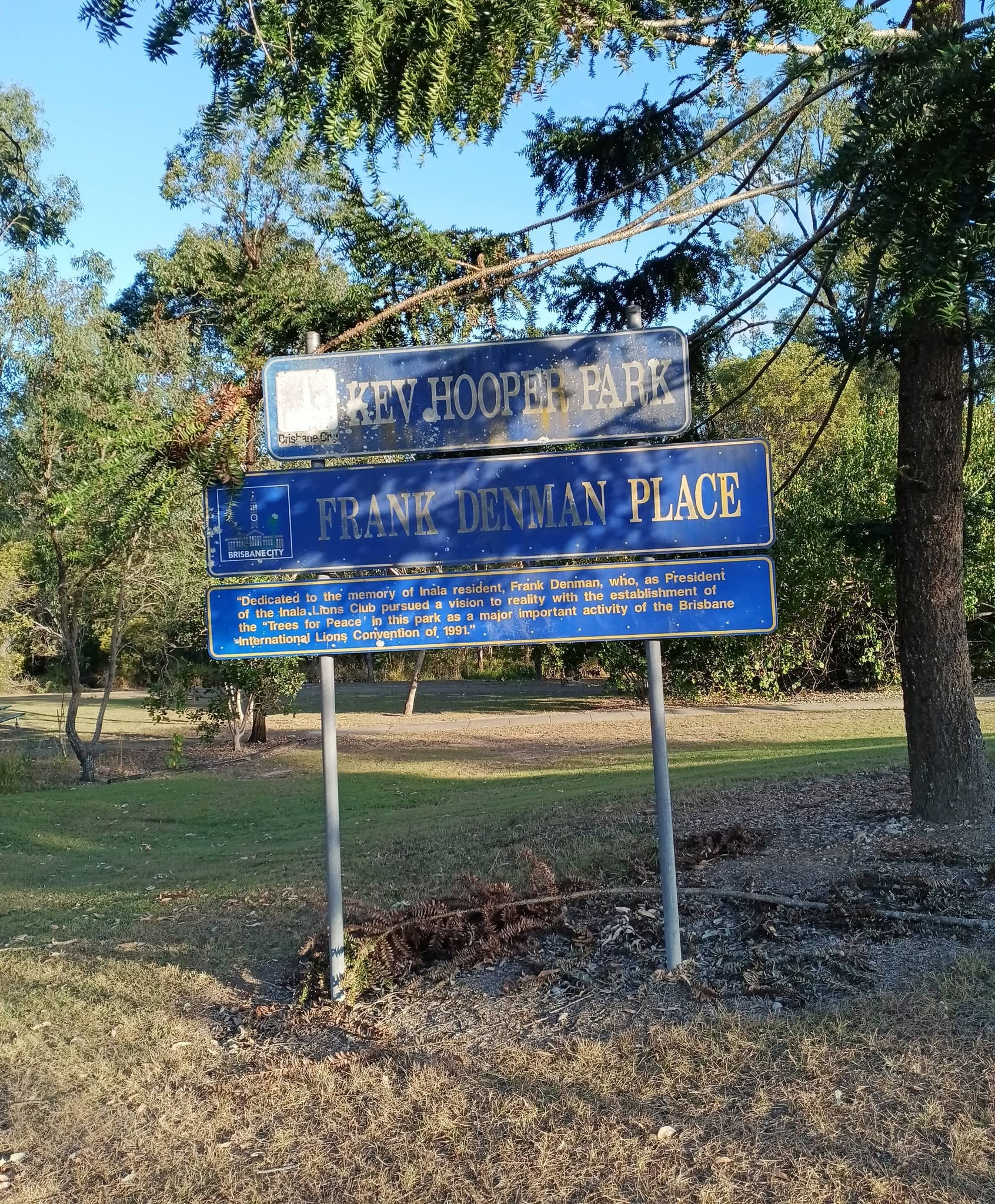
Kev Hooper Park - Frank Denman Place, Inala Queensland

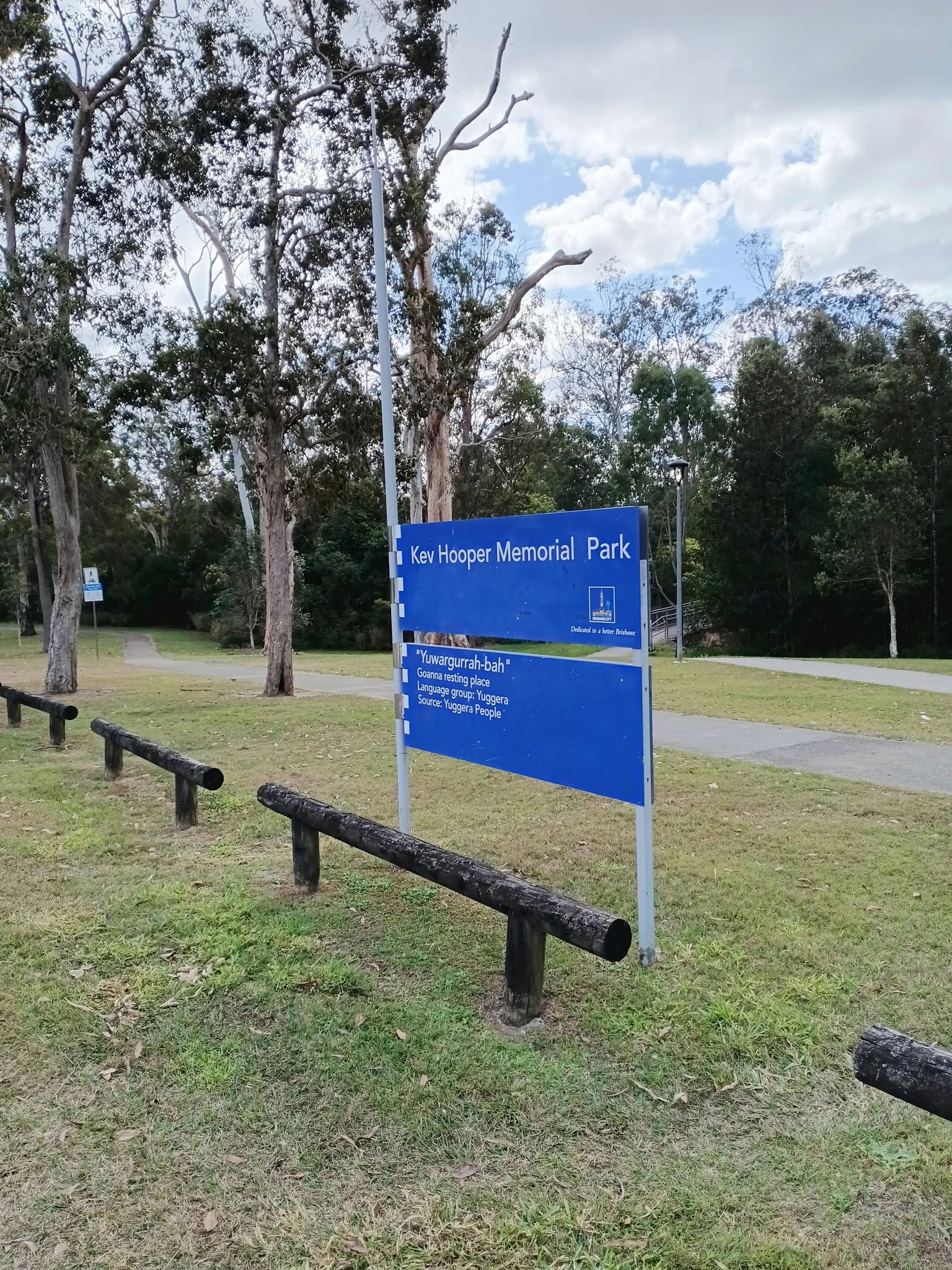
Kev Hooper Park, Inala Brisbane Queensland

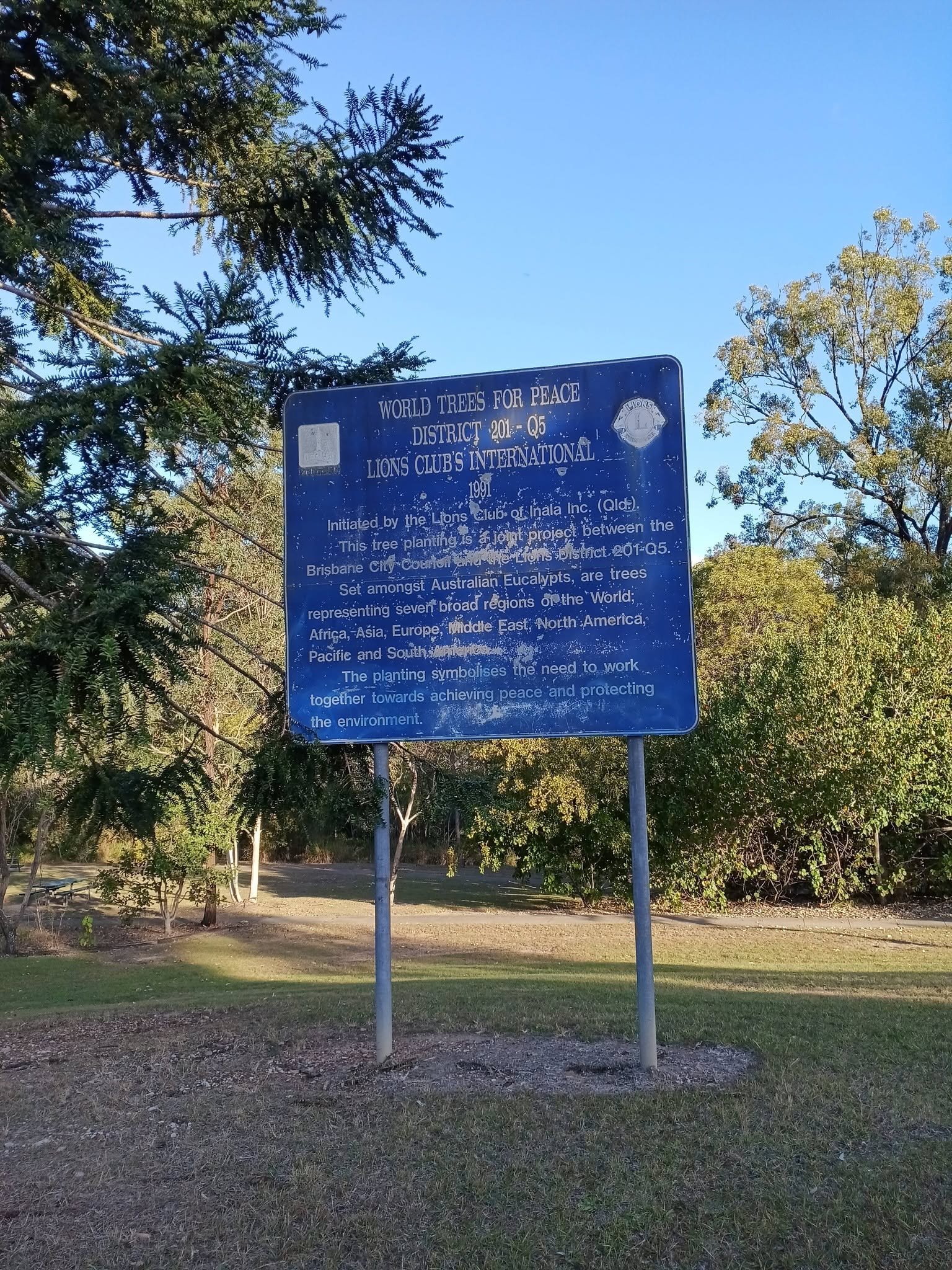
Kev Hooper Park - Lions Club signage, Inala Queensland

Kev Hooper Bridge, Acacia Ridge Queensland

Kev Hooper Bridge, 153A Learoyd Rd, Acacia Ridge

Parliament of Queensland
New seat	Member for Archerfield; 1972–1984	Succeeded by Henry Palaszczuk
