= Anthony Shorten =

Australian politician

Member of the Queensland Parliament for Algester
- In office 24 March 2012 – 31 January 2015
- Preceded by: Karen Struthers
- Succeeded by: Leeanne Enoch

Personal details
- Born: 12 June 1969 (age 56)
- Party: Independent

Anthony Shorten (born 12 June 1969) is a former Australian Liberal National politician and a former Member of the Queensland Legislative Assembly. He currently is a community advocate for the Logan region. In October 2023 he became a candidate for Logan City Council Division 7. He was not successful in being elected.

== Politics ==
Shorten represented Algester from 2012 to 2015, having defeated Karen Struthers at the 2012 state election.

Parliament of Queensland
| Preceded by Karen Struthers | Member for Algester; 2012–2015 | Succeeded by Leeanne Enoch |
