= Henry Palaszczuk =

Australian politician

The Honourable Henry Palaszczuk

Minister for Water
- In office 2 February 2006 – 13 September 2006
- Premier: Peter Beattie
- Preceded by: Office created
- Succeeded by: Kerry Shine

Minister for Natural Resources and Mines
- In office 28 July 2005 – 13 September 2006
- Premier: Peter Beattie
- Preceded by: Stephen Robertson
- Succeeded by: Kerry Shine (Natural Resources); Geoff Wilson (Mines)

Minister for Fisheries
- In office 12 February 2004 – 28 July 2005
- Premier: Peter Beattie
- Preceded by: Trevor Perrett
- Succeeded by: Gordon Nuttall

Minister for Rural Communities
- In office 16 December 1999 – 12 February 2004
- Premier: Peter Beattie
- Preceded by: Terry Mackenroth
- Succeeded by: Warren Pitt

Minister for Primary Industries
- In office 29 June 1998 – 28 July 2005
- Premier: Peter Beattie
- Preceded by: Marc Rowell
- Succeeded by: Gordon Nuttall

Shadow Minister for Primary Industries
- In office 7 October 1997 – 29 June 1998
- Leader: Peter Beattie
- Preceded by: Robert Schwarten
- Succeeded by: Russell Cooper

Shadow Minister for Natural Resources and Multicultural and Ethnic Affairs
- In office 27 February 1996 – 7 October 1997
- Leader: Peter Beattie
- Preceded by: Howard Hobbs
- Succeeded by: Robert Schwarten

Member of the Queensland Parliament for Inala
- In office 19 September 1992 – 9 September 2006
- Preceded by: New seat
- Succeeded by: Annastacia Palaszczuk

Member of the Queensland Parliament for Archerfield
- In office 19 May 1984 – 19 September 1992
- Preceded by: Kevin Hooper
- Succeeded by: Len Ardill

Personal details
- Born: Heinrich Palaszczuk; 12 January 1947 (age 79) Germany
- Party: Labor
- Children: 4 (Including Annastacia)
- Parent(s): Hipolit Palaszczuk and Ludwika (nee Boba)
- Education: Kelvin Grove Teachers College
- Alma mater: Queensland University

Heinrich Palaszczuk (/ˈpæləʃeɪ/, Polish: [pa'waʂt͡ʂuk]; born 12 January 1947) is a former Labor member of the Legislative Assembly of Queensland, and minister of the Beattie Government of Queensland. He was elected as the member for Archerfield in 1984, and held that seat until his election as the member for Inala in 1992. Palaszczuk retired from politics in 2006, and was succeeded in his seat of Inala by his daughter Annastacia Palaszczuk, who was the Premier of Queensland from 2015 until her resignation in December 2023.

== Early life and career ==
Palaszczuk was born in Germany to Polish parents. His family moved to Queensland when he was young. Prior to entering politics, he earned a Diploma of Education and became a school teacher. From 1980 to 1987, he was a secretary of the Inala Branch of the Labor Party, and served as the president of various electorate committees for state and federal government. Between 1985 and 1993, he worked as the campaign director on elections for the City of Brisbane and the federal electoral division of Rankin.

== Member of parliament ==
As a member of parliament, Palaszczuk served on numerous committees, including the Estimates Committee and Standing Orders Committee, as well as being a Deputy Government Whip between 1990 and 1992.

When the Goss Labor Government was re-elected in 1995, the Labor caucus nominated Palaszczuk for speaker, to replace the sitting Labor speaker Jim Fouras. Labor later voted for Fouras in parliament, however, due to fears that Fouras would be re-elected as speaker with the support of the Nationals and Liberals. Wanting to avoid the controversy of Fouras crossing the floor to elect himself as speaker, Labor decided to support him instead of Palaszczuk.

=== Shadow Cabinet ===
After the fall of the Goss Government in February 1996, Palaszczuk joined the Opposition front bench as Shadow Minister for Natural Resources and Multicultural and Ethnic Affairs, later moving to Primary Industries.

=== Beattie Government Minister ===
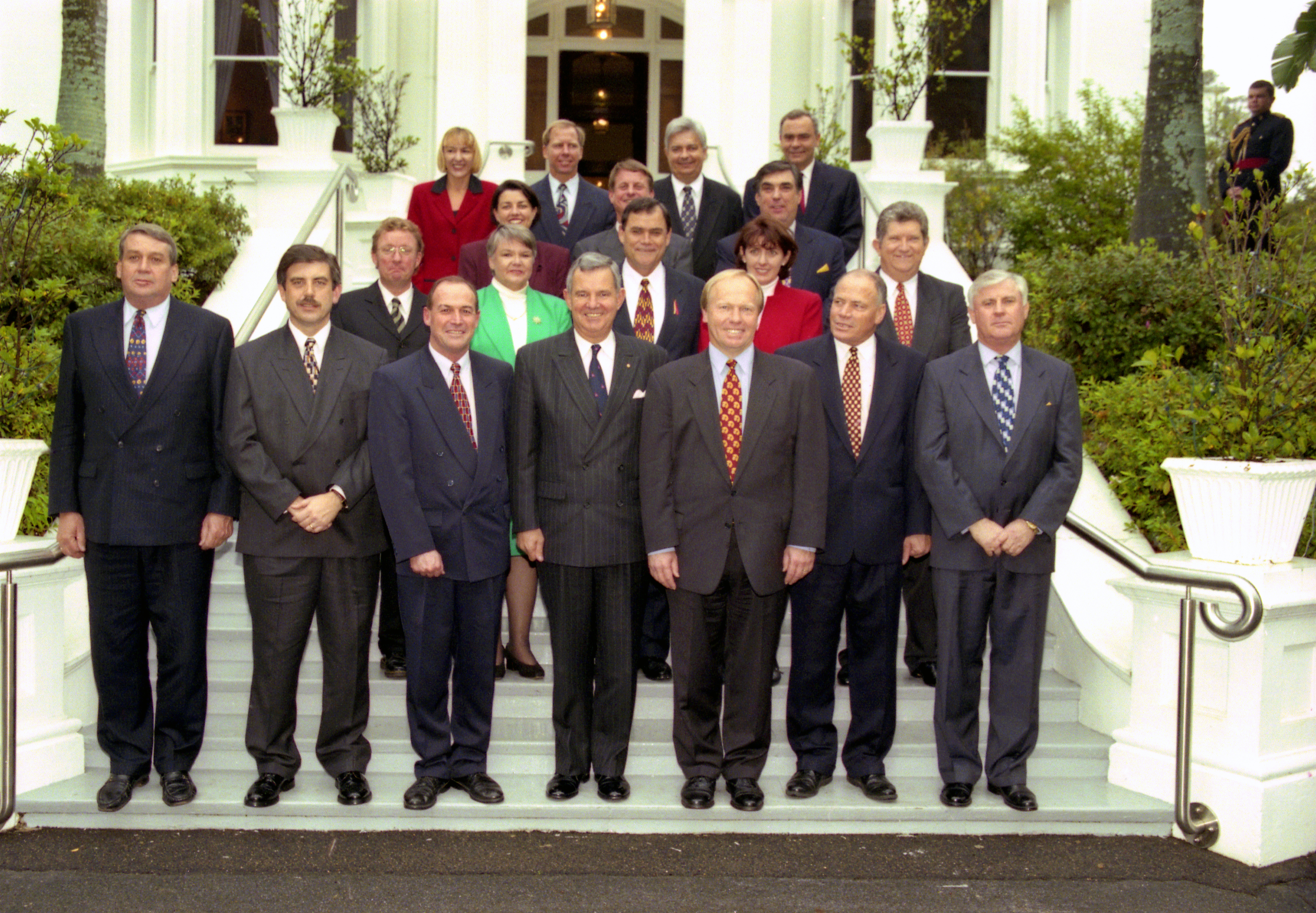
Palaszczuk (top row, third from left) with fellow members of the Beattie Ministry in June 1998

When the Beattie Labor Government was elected in 1998, Palaszczuk was appointed Minister for Primary Industries. In 1999, he was also appointed Minister for Rural Communities. Following the 2004 election, he was appointed Minister for Primary Industries and Fisheries. When Terry Mackenroth resigned as Treasurer and Deputy Premier in 2005, he was appointed Minister for Natural Resources and Mines, and in 2006 he had Water added to his portfolio.

He continued in cabinet until he retired at the 2006 election.

== Personal life ==
Palaszczuk is married, and has four daughters, including former Premier Annastacia Palaszczuk, who represented the same seat he did, Inala. He lives in Brisbane.

== See also ==
- Political families of Australia

Parliament of Queensland
Preceded by Kevin Hooper	Member for Archerfield; 1984–1992	Succeeded by Len Ardill
New seat	Member for Inala; 1992–2006	Succeeded by Annastacia Palaszczuk
