= Karen Struthers =

Australian politician

The Hon Karen Struthers
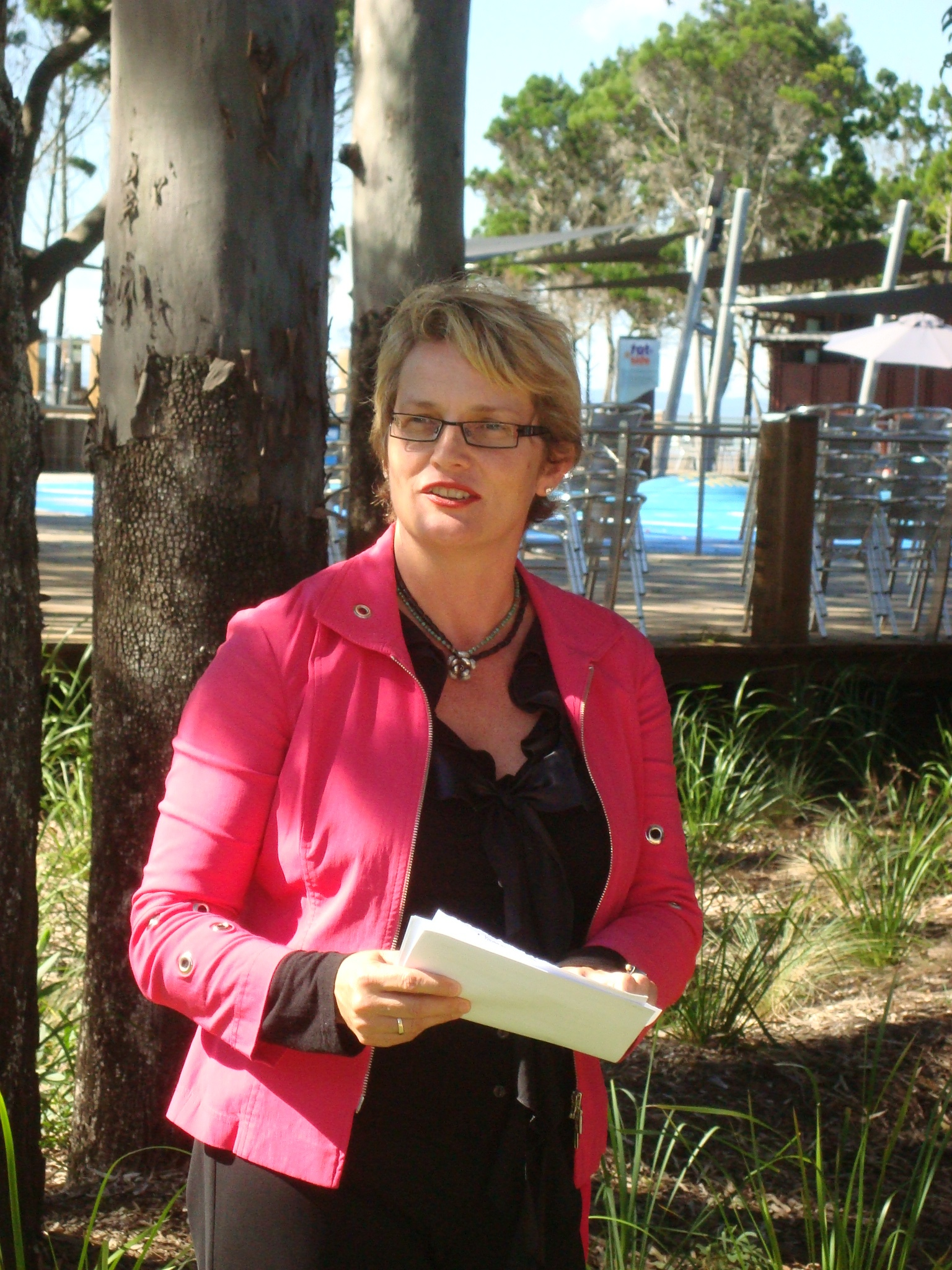

Minister for Community Services of Queensland
- In office 26 March 2009 – 26 March 2012
- Premier: Anna Bligh
- Preceded by: Lindy Nelson-Carr (Communities)
- Succeeded by: Tracy Davis (Communities)

Minister for Housing of Queensland
- In office 26 March 2009 – 26 March 2012
- Premier: Anna Bligh
- Preceded by: Robert Schwarten
- Succeeded by: Bruce Flegg

Minister for Women of Queensland
- In office 26 March 2009 – 26 March 2012
- Premier: Anna Bligh
- Preceded by: Margaret Keech
- Succeeded by: Tracy Davis (as Minister for Communities)

Member of the Queensland Parliament for Algester Archerfield (1998–2001)
- In office 13 June 1998 – 24 March 2012
- Preceded by: Len Ardill
- Succeeded by: Anthony Shorten

Personal details
- Born: 19 February 1963 (age 63) Adelaide, South Australia, Australia
- Party: Labor Party
- Children: 1
- Education: University of Queensland, Griffith University

Karen Struthers (born 19 February 1963) is an Australian politician who served in the Legislative Assembly of Queensland from 1998 to 2012.

== Early life and career ==
Before she was elected Struthers was an assistant director of the Queensland Council of Social Service.

== Member of parliament ==
She first entered Parliament at the 1998 election, winning the seat of Archerfield after the retirement of sitting member Len Ardill.

Archerfield was abolished in a redistribution ahead of the 2001 state election, and Struthers followed most of her constituents into the new seat of Algester, which she held until her defeat in the 2012 election.

=== Beattie Ministry ===
She was promoted to the front bench on 12 February 2004 as Parliamentary Secretary to the Premier (Multicultural Affairs) and Minister for Trade. She was appointed Parliamentary Secretary to the Minister for Employment, Training and Industrial Relations on 28 July 2005 and became Parliamentary Secretary to the Minister of Health on 13 September 2006.

=== Bligh Ministry ===
In March 2009, she was promoted to the Cabinet as Minister for Community Services and Housing and Minister for Women.

Struthers was one of several Labor MPs in previously safe seats who were swept out in the massive Liberal National landslide of 2012, losing to LNP challenger Anthony Shorten on a swing of over 18 percent—enough to turn the seat from safe Labor to safe LNP in one stroke. In a measure of the backlash against Labor that year, Struthers had seen off a challenge from Shorten in 2009, taking 59 percent of the two-party vote.

== Personal life ==
She has one son.

Parliament of Queensland
Preceded by Len Ardill	Member for Archerfield; 1998–2001	Abolished
New seat	Member for Algester; 2001–2012	Succeeded by Anthony Shorten
