= Electoral district of Archerfield =

Former state electoral district of Queensland, Australia

Archerfield Queensland—Legislative Assembly
- State: Queensland
- Created: 1972
- Abolished: 2001
- Namesake: Archerfield
- Demographic: Metropolitan
- Coordinates: 27°34′S 153°01′E

Archerfield was an electoral district of the Legislative Assembly in the Australian state of Queensland from 1972 to 2001.

The district was based in the south-western suburbs of Brisbane and named for the suburb of Archerfield.

== Members for Archerfield ==
The members for Archerfield were:

Member	Party	Term
Kevin Hooper	Labor	1972–1984
Henry Palaszczuk	Labor	1984–1992
Len Ardill	Labor	1992–1998
Karen Struthers	Labor	1998–2001

== See also ==
- Electoral districts of Queensland
- Members of the Queensland Legislative Assembly by year
- Category:Members of the Queensland Legislative Assembly by name
