= Poleshuks =

East Slavic ethnic group

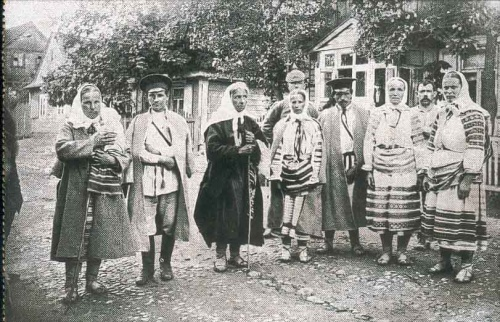
- Poleshuks from Kobryn (1916)

Regions with significant populations
- Belarus: 14,000
- Ukraine: 9,000

Languages
- West Polesian, Russian, Ukrainian (Polesian dialects), Belarusian

Religion
- Christianity, Slavic Native Faith

Related ethnic groups
- Belarusians, Ukrainians, Podlashuks

The Poleshuks, Paleshuks or Polishchuks, also known as Polesians (Belarusian: палешукі, romanized: palešuki; Ukrainian: поліщуки, romanized: polishchuky; Russian: полещуки, romanized: poleshchuki; Polish: Poleszucy), are the indigenous population of Polesia (also known as Polesie and Polissia). Their native speech forms a dialect continuum between the Belarusian and Ukrainian languages and includes recently codified West Polesian, as well as many local variations and sub-dialects.

== History ==
=== Interwar period ===
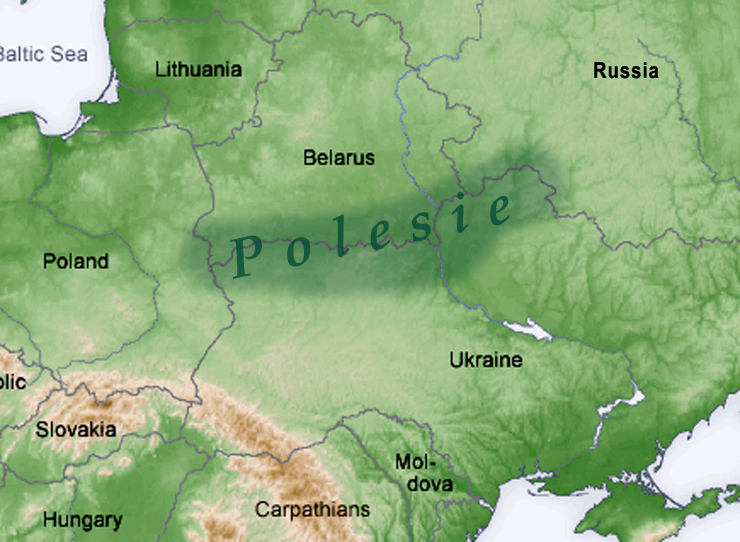
Polesia (dark green), current borders

Since the interbellum, the Poleshuks started developing a sense of identity, influenced by the ethnic politics of the Second Polish Republic within the Polesie Voivodeship. The voivodship had the sparsest population and among the lowest levels of prosperity, due to its adverse climatic and agricultural (soil) conditions. A 1923 Polish statistical document said that 38.600 of 880.900 of population in Polesie Voivodeship (about 4%) were identified as Polezhuks, who self-identified their ethnicity in the census as tutejszy ("local"). The document noted that they were using East Slavic dialects, transitional between Ukrainian and Belarusian, sometimes identified as a separate Polesian language. In the 1931 Polish Census the question about ethnicity was replaced with the question about mother tongue. As a result, 62.5% of population identified their language as tutejszy ("local"). (14.5% declared Polish and 10.0% declared Yiddish or Hebrew as mother tongue.) That some respondents declared their language as Belarusian or Ukrainian was interpreted as the formation of the corresponding ethnic consciousness in the area. Currently the ethnic group of Poleshuks is considered one of the distinct cultural and ethnic identities in the area, while most of the population of the Belarusian, Polish and Ukrainian parts of the region of Polesie have assimilated with the respective nations, as well as with Russian ethnos.

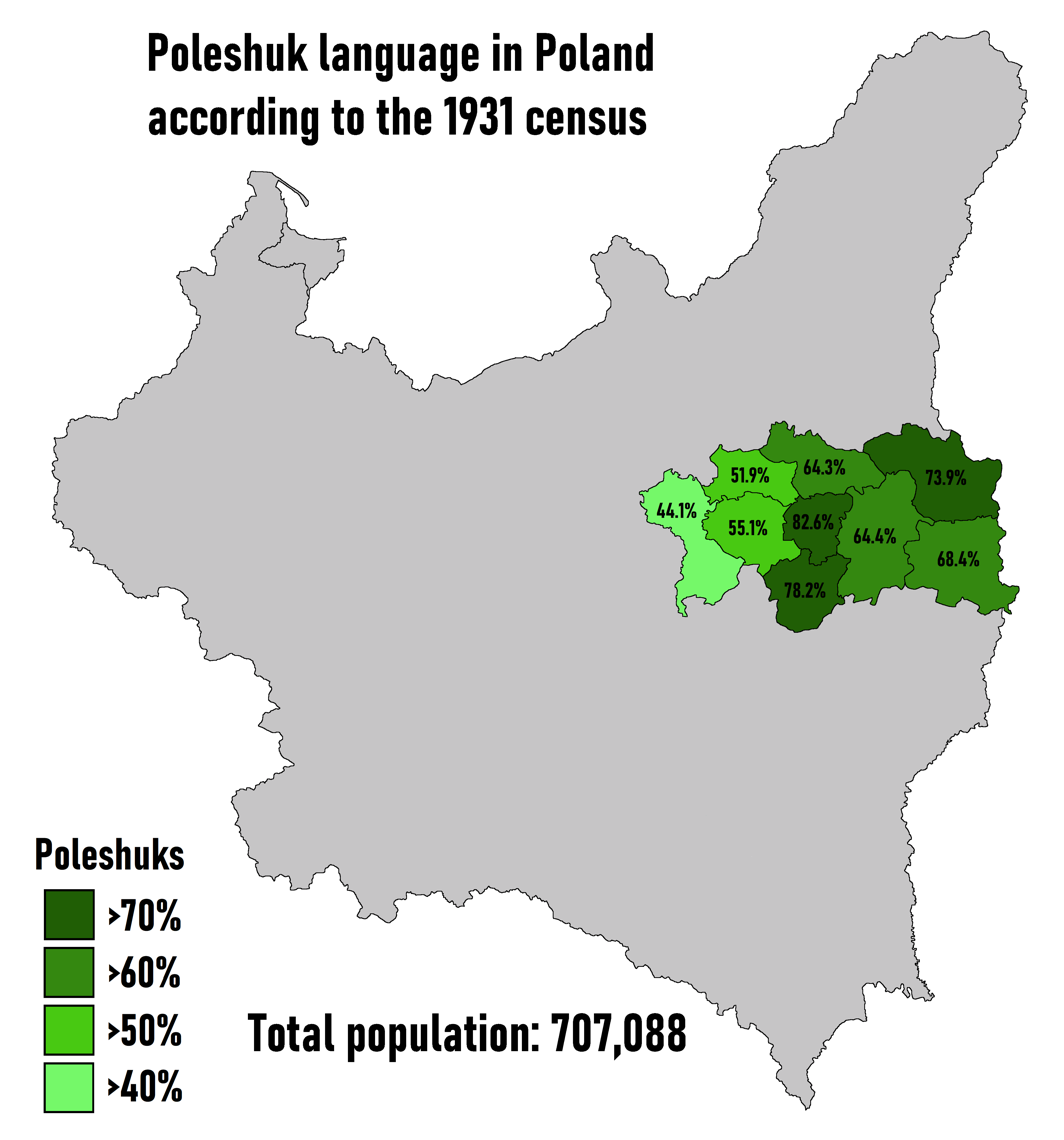
"Tutejszy" (Poleshuk) language in the 1931 Polish census

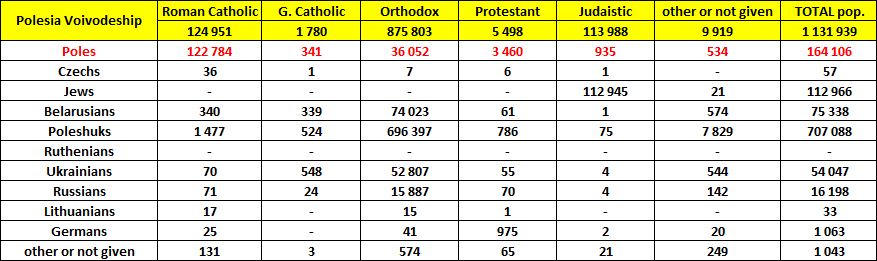
Linguistic and religious structure of the Polesie Voivodeship in 1931

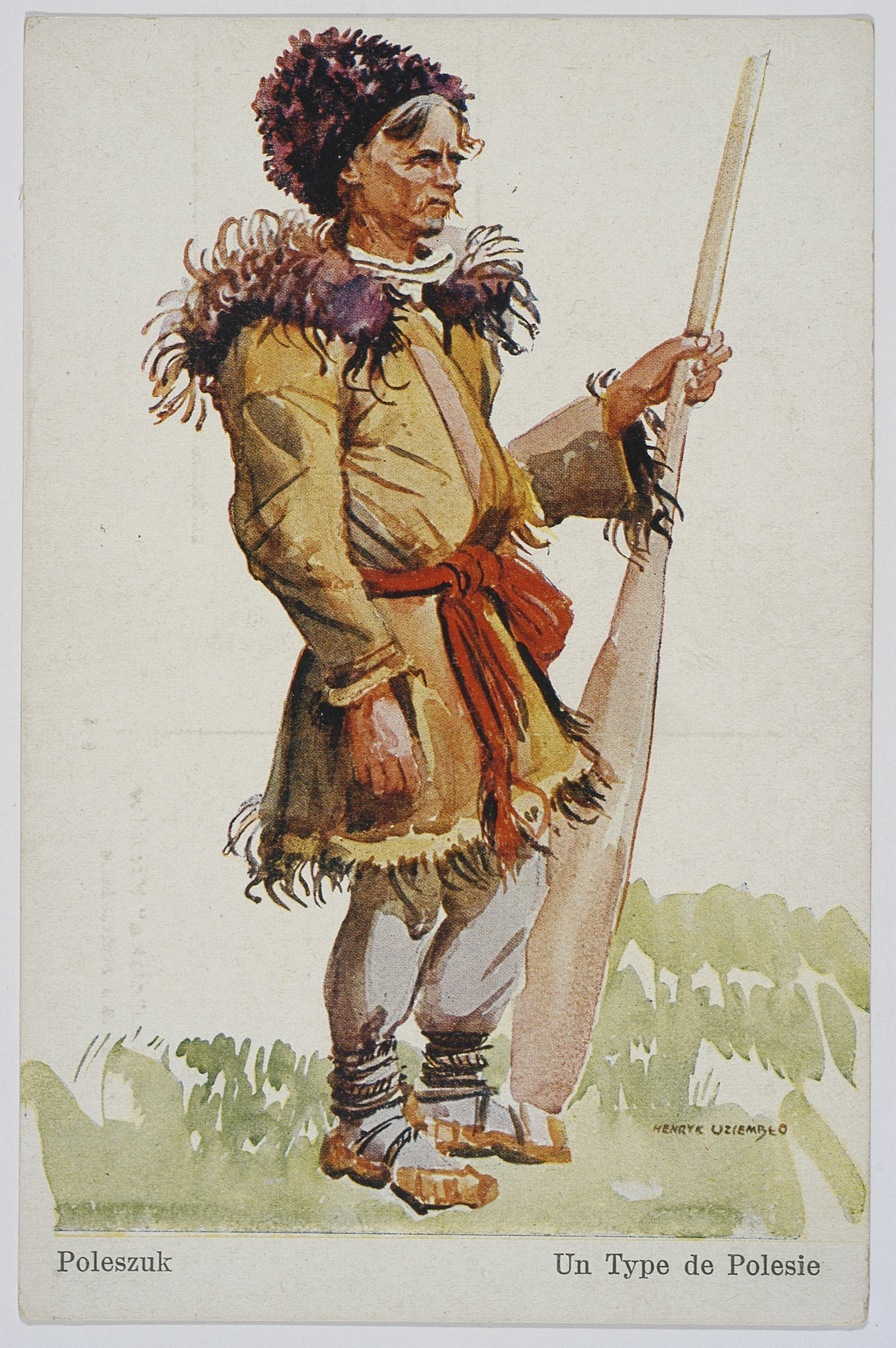
Poleszuk (1939)

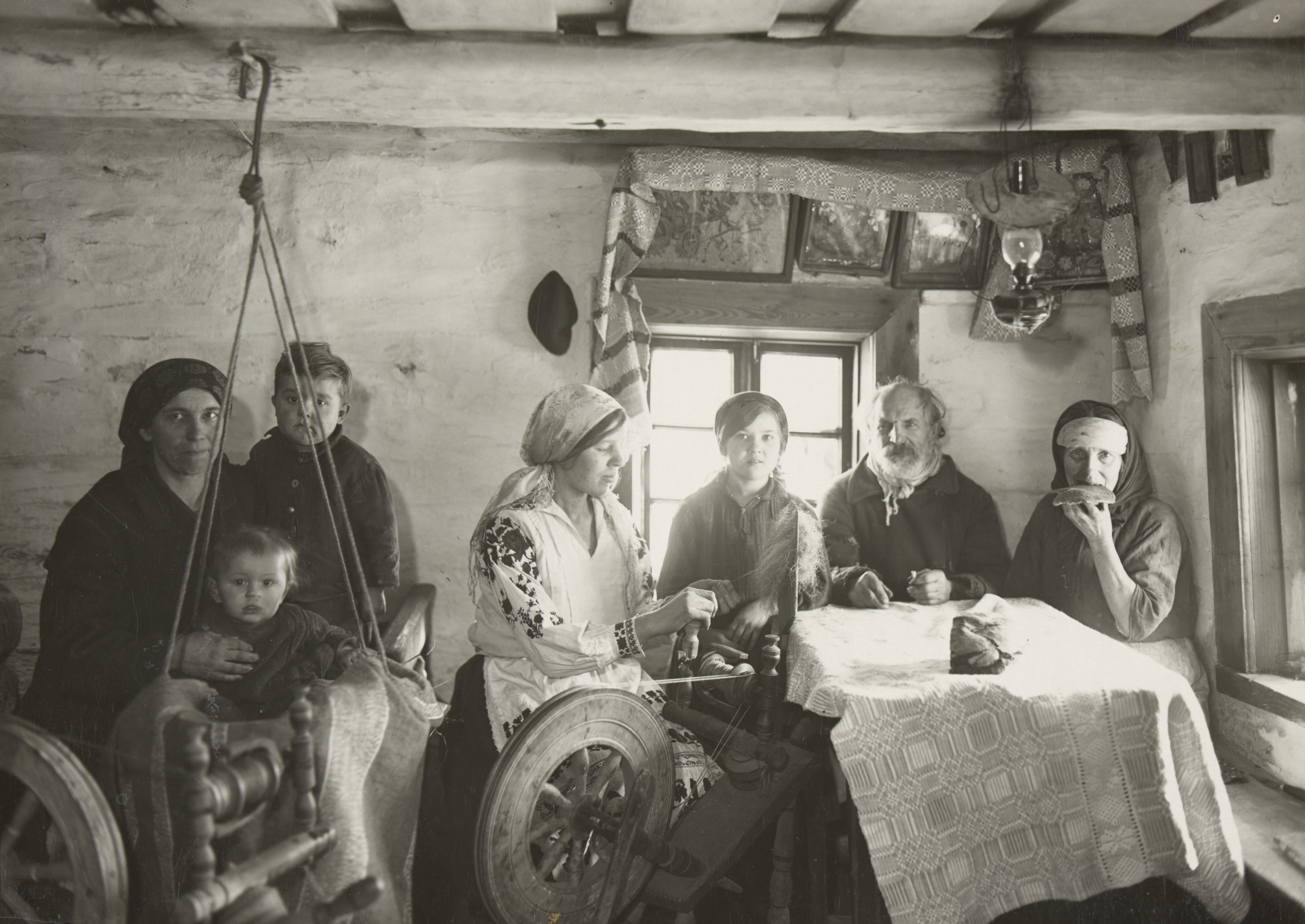
The interior of the house, Sieńkavičy, before 1939

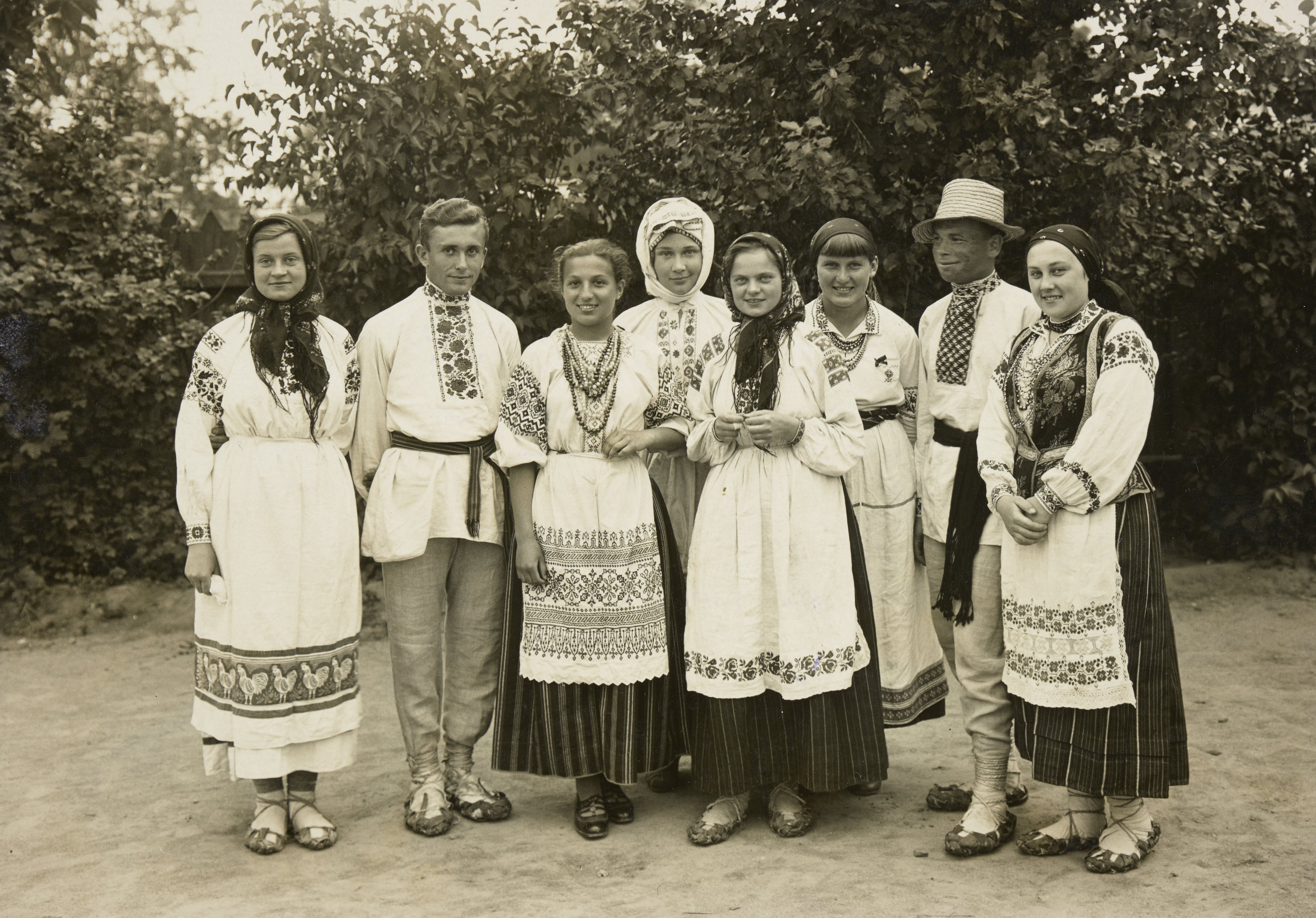
Poleshuks, before 1939

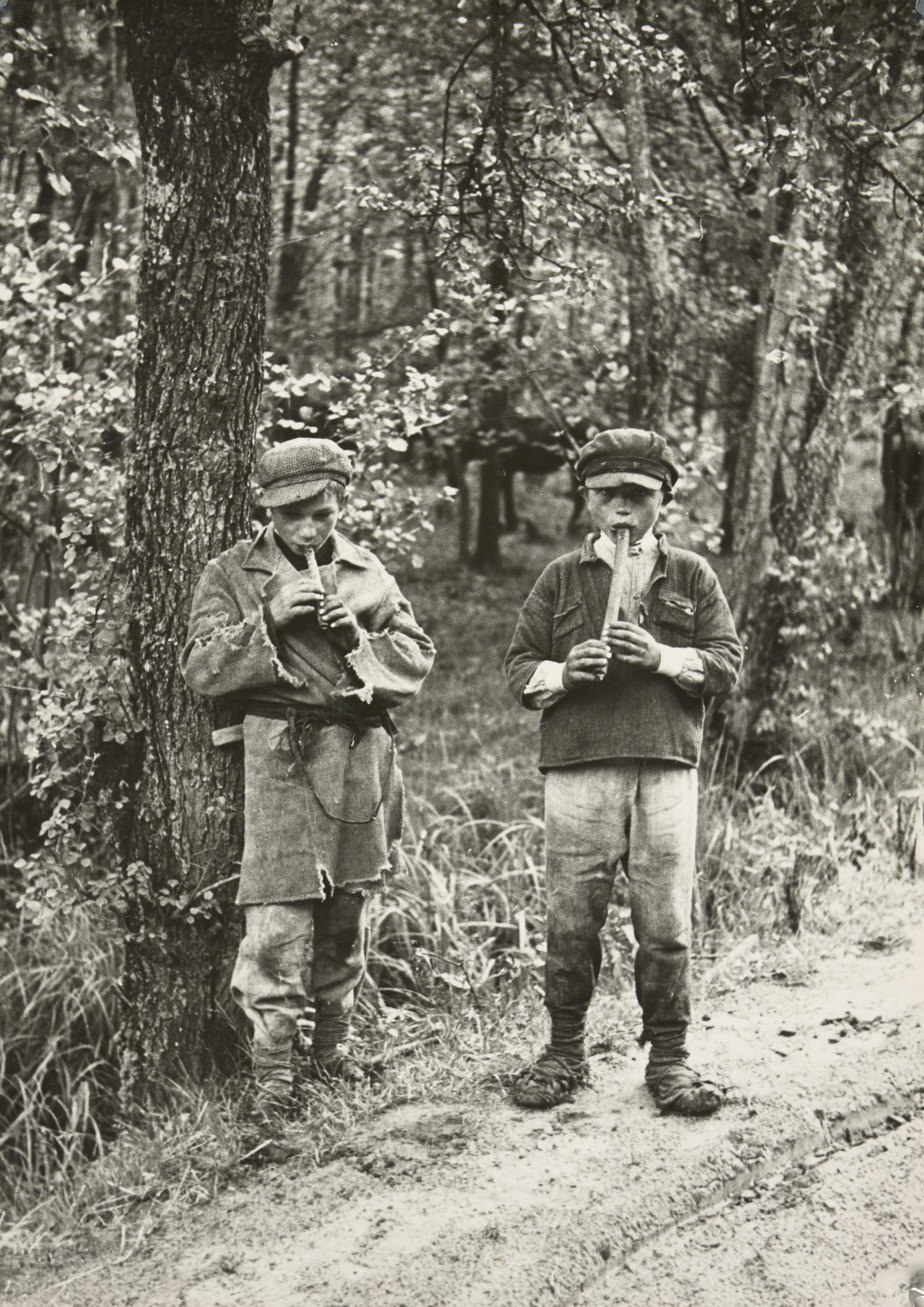
Shepherds near Sitsitsk, circa 1936

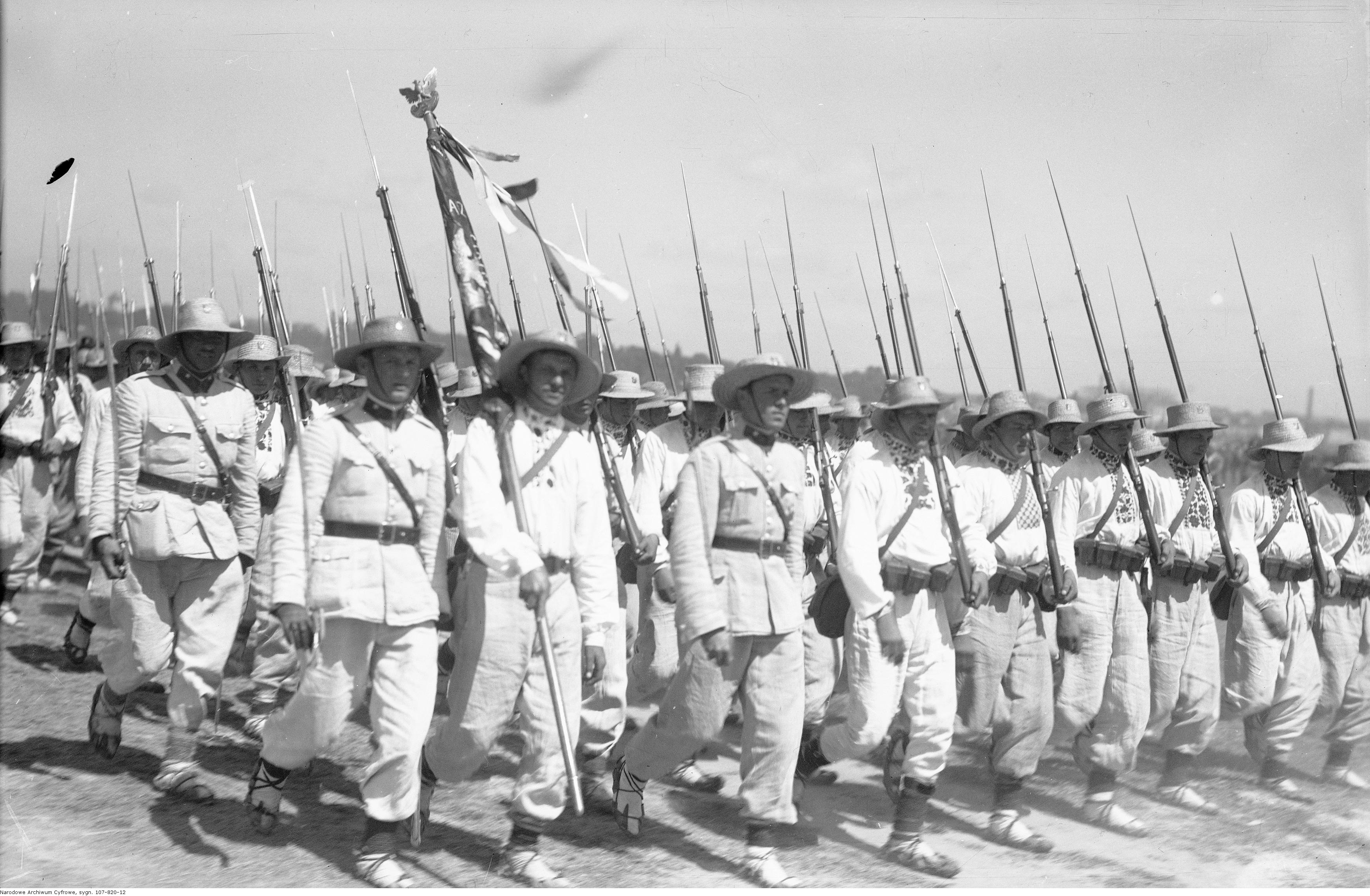
Military march of Poleshuks, 1937

=== Polesie Cultural Union ===
In 1988, Nikolai Shelyagovich created the public-cultural association "Polesie" on the Belarusian Culture Fund. Its goals were the revival of the Western Polesie language, and recognition of the local residents of as a national minority, with some further supporting national and cultural autonomy or even independence of Western Polesie. The organization caused great interest among the intelligentsia of Minsk and Brest, attracting many well-known scholars, researchers, philologists, historians, writers and poets. With the Belarusian referendum in 1995, the activities of the association gradually tapered off.

== Culture ==
=== Cuisine ===
The cuisine of Polishchuks is characterized with abundance of products won through fishing and gathering, such as fish (tench, crucian carp, perch), berries, mushrooms and grass. Many dishes are prepared with the use of rye flour, for example pies, pancakes and various kinds of bread. A traditional Polesian dish is buckwheat varenyky with soured milk. Another authentic speciality in the region is kvasha, prepared from soured rye and buckwheat flour. Typical festive dishes cooked by Polishchuks are borshch, kissel, thick pancakes with sour cream, cottage cheese with milk and millet kasha.

==== Common Polishchuk dishes ====
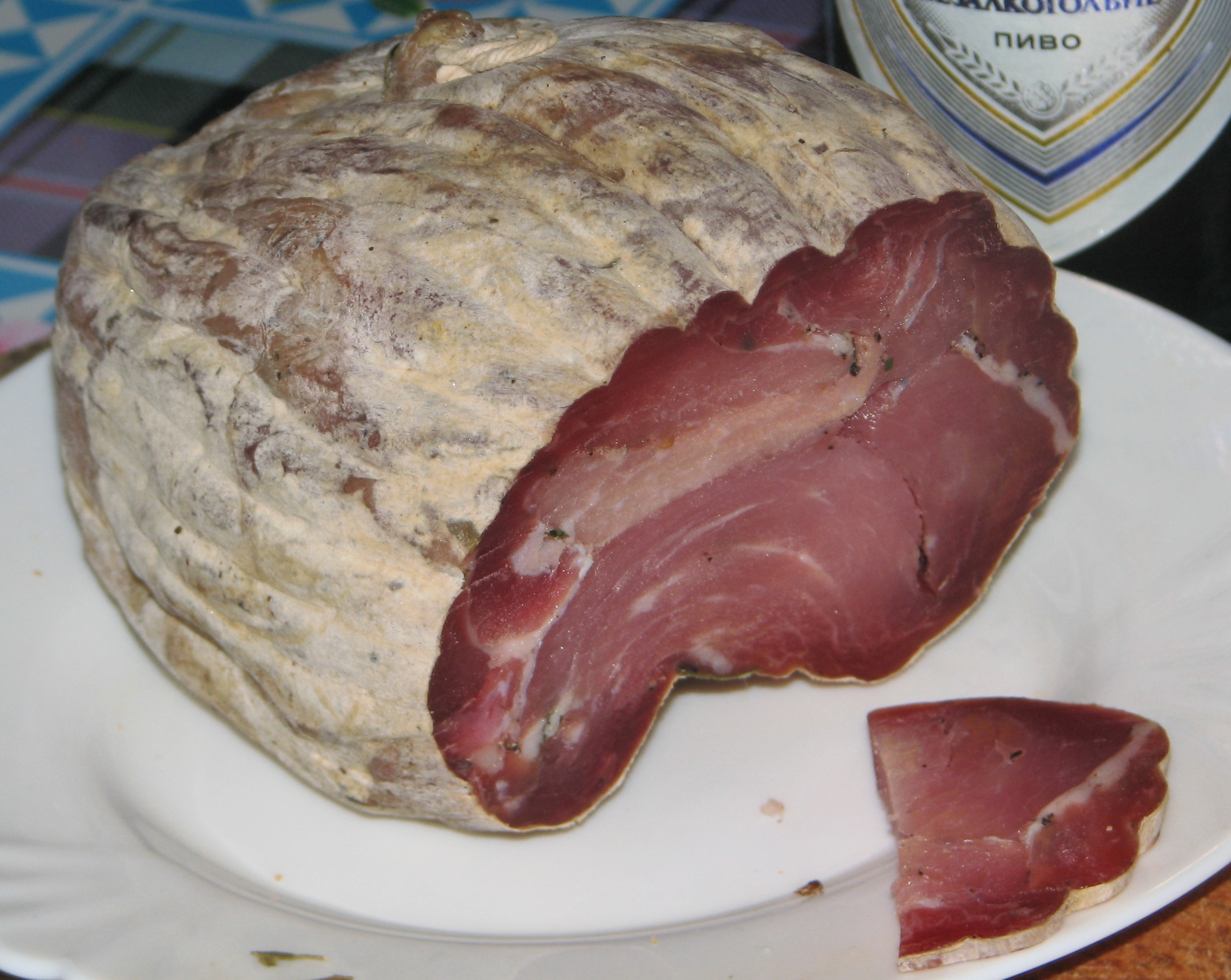
Matsyk, a traditional Polesian dish made of cured pork

- Blueberries - can be dried and mixed with sugar, flour or poppyseed, also consumed fresh with bread and milk or sour cream;
- Bukhty - wheat flour pastry with raisins and berries;
- Hartanachka - millet porridge with meat and potatoes, cooked in a large pot;
- Hurky - braised cucumbers with carrots, onions, poultry or pork;
- Kalamukha - a dessert made from boiled cherries, sour cream and flour;
- Kvasovka - a wedding dish made from boiled millet with addition of dried cherries, apples and plums;
- Krupnyk - a soup with millet, mushrooms, whey etc.;
- Matsyk (also known as kavruk, kirukh, matsiok, kniushok, bohuk) - salted cured meat prepared by keeping it in a linen bag or pig stomach/bladder for several months;
- Oven-baked cabbage (kapusta);
- Syta - a type of honey water made in relation to Poleshuk bartnictwo traditions. It is can be consumed warm, at room temperature, or chilled overnight;
- Tomachi - mashed potatoes;
- Volok (voylok) - boiled or braised leaves of beetroot, goosefoot or nettle, seasoned with sour cream, whey, seed oil or garlic.

== See also ==
- Polekhs
- Podlashuks
- Tutejszy
