= Electoral history of Pauline Hanson =

Elections featuring Australian politician

Electoral history of Pauline Hanson.

== Australian Senate elections ==
=== 2022 ===
2022 Australian federal election: Senate, Queensland
Party	Candidate	Votes	%	±%
Quota		430,553		
Liberal National	1. James McGrath (elected 1); 2. Matt Canavan (elected 3); 3. Amanda Stoker; 4. Nicole Tobin; 5. Andrew Cripps; 6. Fiona Ward	1,061,638	35.23	–3.67
Labor	1. Murray Watt (elected 2); 2. Anthony Chisholm (elected 6); 3. Edwina Andrew; 4. Christina Warry; 5. Jen Henderson; 6. Richard Pascoe	744,212	24.69	+2.12
Greens	1. Penny Allman-Payne (elected 4); 2. Anna Sri; 3. Ben Pennings; 4. Navdeep Singh Sidhu; 5. Alyce Nelligan; 6. Rebecca Haley	373,460	12.39	+2.45
One Nation	1. Pauline Hanson (elected 5); 2. Raj Guruswamy; 3. George Christensen	222,925	7.40	–2.87
Legalise Cannabis	1. Bernard Bradley; 2. Suzette Luyken	161,899	5.37	+3.62
United Australia	1. Clive Palmer; 2. Martin Brewster; 3. Desmond Adidi; 4. Jack McCabe	126,343	4.19	+0.67
Liberal Democrats	1. Campbell Newman; 2. Tegan Grainger	75,158	2.49	+1.66
Animal Justice	1. Mackenzie Severns; 2. Sue Weber	38,765	1.29	–0.04
Indigenous-Aboriginal	1. Lionel Henaway; 2. Jenny-Lee Carr	32,841	1.09	+1.09
Great Australian	1. Jason Miles; 2. Elise Cottam	24,262	0.81	+0.63
Sustainable Australia	1. Rhett Martin; 2. Timotheos Firestone	19,146	0.64	+0.35
Australian Values	1. Heston Russell; 2. Jay Hansen	18,194	0.60	+0.60
Informed Medical Options	1. Allona Lahn; 2. Jasmine Melhop; 3. Peter Lambeth	13,916	0.46	+0.18
Group A	1. Len Harris; 2. Debra Yuille	13,205	0.44	+0.44
Democrats	1. Luke Arbuckle; 2. Chris Simpson	11,473	0.38	+0.38
Fusion	1. Brandon Selic; 2. Roger Whatling	11,079	0.37	+0.37
Socialist Alliance	1. Renee Lees; 2. Kamala Emanuel	10,538	0.34	+0.34
Federation	1. Isabel Tilyard; 2. Jackie Bennett; 3. Michael Smyth	7,330	0.24	+0.24
Reason	1. Ron Williams; 2. Frank Jordan	6,514	0.22	+0.22
Federal ICAC Now	1. Kerin Payne; 2. Ken Carroll	6,199	0.21	+0.21
Citizens	1. Jan Pukallus; 2. Rod Doel	6,123	0.20	+0.13
Drew Pavlou Democratic Alliance	1. Drew Pavlou; 2. Simon Leitch	4,555	0.15	+0.15
Group H	1. Steve Dickson; 2. Rebecca Lloyd	4,566	0.15	+0.15
TNL	1. Bess Brennan; 2. Hannah Kennish; 3. Steven Hopley; 4. Jonathon Momsen; 5. Lloyd Ingram; 6. Jack Creighton	4,302	0.14	+0.14
Group I	1. Mike Head; 2. John Davis	1,129	0.04	+0.04
Ungrouped	Robert Lyon (KAP); David Schfe; Lindsay Temple; Chey Hamilton; Lorraine Smith; Laurence Quinlivan; Karakan Kochardy; Peter Rogers	14,096	0.47	+0.31
Total formal votes		3,013,868	96.88	+0.14
Informal votes		97,166	3.12	−0.14
Turnout		3,111,034	88.85	–3.07

=== 2016 ===
2016 Australian federal election: Senate, Queensland
Party	Candidate	Votes	%	±%
Quota		209,475		
Liberal National	1. George Brandis (elected 1); 2. Matt Canavan (elected 4); 3. James McGrath (elected 6); 4. Ian Macdonald (elected 8); 5. Barry O'Sullivan (elected 10); 6. Joanna Lindgren; 7. Dan Ryan; 8. Gerard Rennick	960,467	35.27	−6.12
Labor	1. Murray Watt (elected 2); 2. Anthony Chisholm (elected 5); 3. Claire Moore (elected 7); 4. Chris Ketter (elected 11); 5. Jane Casey; 6. Cheryl Thompson	717,524	26.35	−2.17
One Nation	1. Pauline Hanson (elected 3); 2. Malcolm Roberts (elected 12) (Note: Roberts was declared to be ineligible by the Court of Disputed Returns because he was a dual citizen of the United Kingdom. A special recount determined that Fraser Anning was elected instead.); 3. Fraser Anning; 4. Judy Smith	250,126	9.19	+8.64
Greens	1. Larissa Waters (elected 9) (Note: Waters resigned on 18 July 2017 because she was a dual citizen of Canada. The Court of Disputed Returns declared she was ineligible to be elected. A special recount declared Andrew Bartlett had been elected instead.); 2. Andrew Bartlett; 3. Ben Pennings; 4. Johanna Kloot; 5. Fiona Anderson; 6. Charles Worringham; 7. Rainee Skinner; 8. Janina Leo; 9. Meg Anderson; 10. Louise Noble; 11. Kirsten Kennedy; 12. Elena Quirk	188,323	6.92	+0.88
Liberal Democrats	1. Gabe Buckley; 2. John Rooth	77,601	2.85	+2.16
Xenophon	1. Suzanne Grant; 2. Daniel Crow	55,653	2.04	+2.04
Family First	1. Rod McGarvie; 2. Sue Baynes; 3. Kate Horan; 4. David Pellowe	52,453	1.93	+0.84
Katter's Australian	1. Rowell Walton; 2. Joy Marriott	48,807	1.79	−1.15
Glenn Lazarus Team	1. Glenn Lazarus; 2. Kerrod Walters; 3. Annette Lourigan	45,149	1.66	+1.66
Animal Justice	1. Paul Bevan; 2. Zade Watson	32,306	1.19	+0.12
Sex Party/HEMP joint ticket	1. Robin Bristow; 2. Therese Howes; 3. Kirsty Patten	30,157	1.11	+1.11
Shooters, Fishers, Farmers	1. Michael Turner; 2. Michael Gee	29,571	1.09	+0.39
Liberty Alliance	1. Bernard Gaynor; 2. Alan Biggs; 3. Chelle Dobson	29,392	1.08	+1.08
Marriage Equality	1. Marnie Southward; 2. William Moran	23,811	0.87	+0.87
Cyclists	1. Chris Cox; 2. Edward Re	19,933	0.73	+0.73
Drug Law Reform	1. Deb Lynch; 2. Lorraine Smith	17,060	0.63	+0.63
Democratic Labour	1. Sheila Vincent; 2. Lucius Majoor	15,443	0.57	+0.25
Justice	1. Deb Cotter; 2. Karin Hanbidge	14,256	0.52	+0.52
Arts	1. Frances Jankowski; 2. Neil Fainges	11,030	0.41	+0.41
Pirate	1. Brandon Selic; 2. Isaac Pursehouse	10,342	0.38	−0.12
Health Australia	1. Jason Woodforth; 2. Sarinah Golden	10,147	0.37	+0.37
Christians	1. Shea Taylor; 2. Malcolm Brice	9,686	0.36	−0.06
Lambie	1. Marcus Saltmarsh; 2. Crystal Peckett	9,138	0.34	+0.34
Christian Democrats	1. Wayne Solomon; 2. Ludy Sweeris-Sigrist	7,314	0.27	+0.27
Renewable Energy	1. James Moylan; 2. MaryBeth Gundrum	6,245	0.23	+0.23
Rise Up Australia	1. Paul Taylor; 2. Neroli Mooney	5,734	0.21	+0.00
Mature Australia	1. Terry Snell; 2. Belinda Cameron	5,519	0.20	+0.20
Online Direct Democracy	1. Peter Radic; 2. David Missingham	5,504	0.20	+0.16
Sustainable Australia	1. John Roles; 2. Matt Moran	5,366	0.20	+0.20
Palmer United	1. James McDonald; 2. Craig Gunnis	4,816	0.18	−9.71
Secular	1. Trevor Bell; 2. Scott Clark	4,623	0.17	+0.07
Defence Veterans	1. Jeremy Davey; 2. Darryl Hodkinson	4,534	0.17	+0.17
CountryMinded	1. Pete Mailler; 2. Sherrill Stivano	2,836	0.10	+0.10
VOTEFLUX.ORG	1. Mark Gardner; 2. Reece Flowers	1,881	0.07	+0.07
Citizens Electoral Council	1. Jan Pukallus; 2. Stephen Harding	1,877	0.07	+0.07
Socialist Equality	1. Mike Head; 2. Erin Cooke	1,639	0.06	+0.00
Group R	1. Sal Rivas; 2. Val Tanguilig	1,536	0.06	+0.06
Progressives	1. Ken Stevens; 2. Jo McCormack	1,213	0.04	+0.04
Ungrouped	Shyamal Reddy; Greg McMahon; David Bundy; Kim Vuga; Jim Savage; Tony Moore; Josephine Potter; Paul Stevenson; Marshal Anderson; Ian Eugarde; Julie Boyd; Leeanne Hanna-McGuffie; Zoemaree Harris; Michael Kaff; Terry Jorgensen; Gary Pead; John Gibson; Belinda Marriage; Greg Beattie	4,154	0.15	−0.01
Total formal votes		2,723,166	96.60	−1.25
Informal votes		95,831	3.40	+1.25
Turnout		2,818,997	91.65	−2.52

#	Senator	Party
1	George Brandis	LNP
2	Murray Watt	Labor
3	Pauline Hanson	One Nation
4	Matt Canavan	LNP
5	Anthony Chisholm	Labor
6	James McGrath	LNP
7	Claire Moore	Labor
8	Ian Macdonald	LNP
9	~~Larissa Waters~~ Andrew Bartlett	Greens
10	Barry O'Sullivan	LNP
11	Chris Ketter	Labor
12	~~Malcolm Roberts~~ Fraser Anning	One Nation

=== 2007 ===
2007 Australian federal election: Senate, Queensland
Party	Candidate	Votes	%	±%
Quota		345,559		
Liberal/National Coalition	1. Ian Macdonald (Lib) (elected 1); 2. Sue Boyce (Lib) (elected 3); 3. Ron Boswell (Nat) (elected 5); 4. Mark Powell (Lib); 5. David Goodwin (Nat); 6. Scott Buchholz (Nat)	977,316	40.40	−4.50
Labor	1. John Hogg (elected 2); 2. Claire Moore (elected 4); 3. Mark Furner (elected 6); 4. Diana O'Brien	948,145	39.20	+7.55
Greens	1. Larissa Waters; 2. Anja Light; 3. Darryl Rosin	177,063	7.32	+1.92
Pauline's UAP	1. Pauline Hanson; 2. David Saville	101,461	4.19	+4.19
Family First	1. Jeff Buchanan; 2. Beryl Spencer; 3. Merlin Manners; 4. Cathy Eaton; 5. Shaun Hart; 6. Elizabeth Benson-Scott	53,249	2.20	−1.17
Democrats	1. Andrew Bartlett; 2. Sharon Neill	45,584	1.88	−0.32
Fishing Party	1. Bob Smith; 2. Elizabeth Stocker	20,290	0.84	−0.44
Fishing and Lifestyle	1. Kevin Collins; 2. Dave Donald	19,131	0.79	+0.79
What Women Want	1. Anne Bousfield; 2. Sonya Beutel	17,370	0.72	+0.72
Shooters	1. Paul Feeney; 2. Allen Hrstich	12,845	0.53	+0.53
Climate Change	1. Phil Johnson; 2. Steve Posselt	8,818	0.36	+0.36
Democratic Labor	1. Noel Jackson; 2. Brian Dowling	7265	0.30	+0.30
Christian Democrats	1. Linda Brice; 2. Malcolm Brice	6,289	0.26	+0.26
Carers Alliance	1. Felicity Maddison; 2. Robert Gow	4,822	0.20	+0.20
One Nation	1. Ian Nelson; 2. Lew Arroita	4,174	0.17	−2.97
Liberty & Democracy	1. John Humphreys; 2. Joseph Clark	3,890	0.16	+0.16
Socialist Alliance	1. Sam Watson; 2. Amelia Taylor	1,941	0.08	−0.02
Group K	1. Richard Hackett-Jones; 2. John Rivett	1,738	0.07	+0.07
Group X	1. James Baker; 2. Louise Fitzgerald-Baker	1,506	0.06	+0.06
Non-Custodial Parents	1. Bill Healey; 2. Doug Thompson	1,390	0.06	−0.13
Senator On-Line	1. Ben Peake; 2. Sharon Bateson	1,251	0.05	+0.05
Citizens Electoral Council	1. Jan Pukallus; 2. Maurice Hetherington	1,155	0.05	−0.10
Group N	1. David Couper; 2. Michael Brown	826	0.03	+0.03
Independent	1. Katrina Alberts; 2. Martin Rady	493	0.02	+0.02
Independent	John Duggan	406	0.02	+0.02
Independent	Robin Petersen	198	0.01	+0.01
Independent	Leo DeMarchi	144	0.01	+0.01
Independent	James Reid	70	0.00	+0.00
Independent	Marsileo Traversari	52	0.00	+0.00
Independent	Pilly Low	25	0.00	+0.00
Total formal votes		2,418,907	97.66	+0.45
Informal votes		57,912	2.34	−0.45
Turnout		2,476,819	94.81	+0.68

=== 2004 ===
2004 Australian federal election: Senate, Queensland
Party	Candidate	Votes	%	±%
Quota		323,611		
Liberal	1. Brett Mason (elected 1); 2. George Brandis (elected 3); 3. Russell Trood (elected 6); 4. Sue Boyce	867,276	38.29	+3.39
Labor	1. Jan McLucas (elected 2); 2. Joe Ludwig (elected 4); 3. Frank Gilbert	717,005	36.12	−0.08
National	1. Barnaby Joyce (elected 5); 2. James Baker; 3. Stewart Gillies	149,719	6.61	−2.55
Greens	1. Drew Hutton; 2. Sarah Moles; 3. Theresa Millard	122,393	5.40	+2.09
Group K	1. Pauline Hanson; 2. Judy Smith	102,824	4.54	+4.54
Family First	1. John Lewis; 2. Tracy Skellern-Smith	76,309	3.37	+3.37
One Nation	1. Len Harris; 2. Ian Nelson; 3. James Savage	71,043	3.14	−6.88
Democrats	1. John Cherry; 2. Bonny Bauer	49,898	2.20	−4.49
Fishing Party	1. Kevin Collins; 2. Darryl Whitford	29,034	1.28	+1.28
Liberals for Forests	1. Joseph Clark; 2. Archie Chapman	22,283	0.98	+0.98
HEMP	1. Guy Freemarijuana; 2. Tony Kneipp	17,485	0.77	−0.54
Group O	1. Hetty Johnston; 2. Diana Scott	15,596	0.69	+0.69
Group A	1. Terry Rushton; 2. Eamon Coll	5,152	0.23	+0.23
Non-Custodial Parents	1. Geoff Webster; 2. Doug Thompson	4,226	0.19	+0.19
Citizens Electoral Council	1. Maurice Hetherington; 2. Ray Gillham	3,359	0.15	+0.05
New Country	1. Lorraine Wheeldon; 2. Rowell Walton	2,841	0.13	+0.13
Socialist Alliance	1. Sam Watson; 2. Nicole Clevens	2,334	0.10	+0.10
Great Australians	1. John Rivett; 2. Mal McKenzie	2,293	0.10	+0.10
Group D	1. Selwyn Johnston; 2. Susan Harvey	1,408	0.06	+0.06
Group G	1. Gail Duncan; 2. Kim McIntosh	1,015	0.04	+0.04
Progressive Alliance	1. Tony Newman; 2. Darrell Morris	921	0.04	+0.04
Independent	Darryl McArthur	568	0.03	+0.03
Independent	Hassan Ghulam	295	0.01	+0.01
Total formal votes		2,265,274	97.21	+0.16
Informal votes		65,037	2.79	−0.16
Turnout		2,330,311	94.13	−1.10

=== 2001 ===
Elected	#	Senator	Party
2001	1	Ian Macdonald	Liberal
2001	2	John Hogg	Labor
2001	3	John Herron	Liberal
2001	4	Claire Moore	Labor
2001	5	Andrew Bartlett	Democrats
2001	6	Ron Boswell	National
1998
1998	1	Jan McLucas	Labor
2000*	2	George Brandis	Liberal
1999†	3	Len Harris	One Nation
1998	4	Joe Ludwig	Labor
1998	5	Brett Mason	Liberal
2001‡	6	John Cherry	Democrats

2001 Australian federal election: Senate, Queensland
Party	Candidate	Votes	%	±%
Quota		307,154		
Liberal	1. Ian Macdonald (elected 1); 2. John Herron (elected 3); 3. Russell Trood; 4. Deborah Kember	750,416	34.90	+9.0
Labor	1. John Hogg (elected 2); 2. Claire Moore (elected 4); 3. Brenda Gibbs	682,239	31.73	−0.9
One Nation	1. Pauline Hanson; 2. Trevor Hansen; 3. Morrie Marsden; 4. John Slack-Smith	215,400	10.02	−4.8
National	1. Ron Boswell (elected 6); 2. Pam Stallman; 3. Barnaby Joyce	196,845	9.16	−0.3
Democrats	1. Andrew Bartlett (elected 5); 2. Liz Oss-Emer; 3. Megan Bathurst	143,942	6.69	−1.0
Greens	1. Sarah Moles; 2. Desiree Mahoney; 3. Mark Taylor	71,102	3.31	+1.2
HEMP	1. Nigel Freemarijuana; 2. Guy Freemarijuana	28,122	1.31	+1.3
No GST	1. David Ettridge; 2. Richard Gooch	24,319	1.13	−1.0
Christian Democrats	1. Kerry Blackman; 2. Geoffrey Bullock	22,703	1.06	−0.3
Group A	1. Sam Watson; 2. Karen Fletcher	8,553	0.40	+0.40
Republican	1. John Pyke; 2. Malcolm Simpson	2,553	0.12	+0.1
Citizens Electoral Council	1. Danny Hope; 2. Nick Contarino	2,226	0.10	+0.10
Independent	Derek Rosborough	700	0.03	+0.03
Independent	Phillip Riley	263	0.01	+0.01
Independent	George Szentes	180	0.01	+0.01
Independent	Oni Kirwin	173	0.01	+0.01
Independent	Anthony Melrose	105	0.01	+0.01
Independent	John Jones	86	0.01	+0.01
Independent	David Howse	78	0.01	+0.01
Independent	Walter Philippi	72	0.01	+0.01
Total formal votes		2,150,077	97.05	+0.09
Informal votes		65,450	2.95	−0.09
Turnout		2,215,527	95.23	+0.33

== Australian House of Representatives elections ==
=== 1998 ===
1998 Australian federal election: Blair
Party	Candidate	Votes	%	±%
One Nation	Pauline Hanson	24,516	35.97	+35.97
Labor	Virginia Clarke	17,239	25.29	−0.18
Liberal	Cameron Thompson	14,787	21.69	−24.19
National	Brett White	6,989	10.25	−6.91
Democrats	Neal McKenzie	2,478	3.64	−2.13
Greens	Libby Connors	1,230	1.80	−0.43
Independent	Lee Roberts	556	0.82	+0.82
Citizens Electoral Council	Owen Bassingthwaighte	199	0.29	+0.29
Abolish Child Support	Mark Sloan	170	0.25	+0.25
Total formal votes		68,164	96.41	−0.98
Informal votes		2,541	3.59	+0.98
Turnout		70,705	95.28	
Two-party-preferred result
Liberal	Cameron Thompson	36,398	53.40	−15.30
One Nation	Pauline Hanson	31,766	46.60	+46.60
Liberal hold		Swing	−15.30	

=== 1996 ===
1996 Australian federal election: Oxley
Party	Candidate	Votes	%	±%
Liberal	Pauline Hanson*	33,960	48.61	+22.86
Labor	Les Scott	27,497	39.36	−15.18
Democrats	David Pullen	4,248	6.08	+0.56
Greens	John McKeon	1,870	2.68	−1.74
Independent	Victor Robb	1,094	1.57	+1.57
	Carl Wyles	765	1.09	+1.09
Indigenous Peoples	Bill Chapman	433	0.62	+0.62
Total formal votes		69,867	97.15	+0.47
Informal votes		2,049	2.85	−0.47
Turnout		71,916	94.94	−0.92
Two-party-preferred result
Liberal	Pauline Hanson*	38,129	54.66	+19.31
Labor	Les Scott	31,622	45.34	−19.31
Independent gain from Labor		Swing	+19.31	

*Pauline Hanson had been disendorsed as the Liberal candidate and ran as an independent, but she remained a Liberal on the ballot paper.

== Queensland State elections ==
=== 2015 ===
2015 Queensland state election: Lockyer
Party	Candidate	Votes	%	±%
Liberal National	Ian Rickuss	10,259	33.73	−18.28
One Nation	Pauline Hanson	8,132	26.74	+26.74
Labor	Steve Leese	7,652	25.16	+7.48
Katter's Australian	David Neuendorf	2,111	6.94	−16.88
Greens	Clare Rudkin	1,190	3.91	−2.58
Palmer United	Craig Gunnis	1,068	3.51	+3.51
Total formal votes		30,412	98.46	+0.8
Informal votes		476	1.54	−0.8
Turnout		30,888	92.14	−1.52
Two-candidate-preferred result
Liberal National	Ian Rickuss	13,230	50.22	−14.65
One Nation	Pauline Hanson	13,116	49.78	+49.78
Liberal National hold		Swing	−14.65	

=== 2009 ===
2009 Queensland state election: Beaudesert
Party	Candidate	Votes	%	±%
Liberal National	Aidan McLindon	10,700	37.9	−12.6
Labor	Brett McCreadie	7,012	24.8	−13.3
Independent	Pauline Hanson	5,998	21.2	+21.2
Independent	Keith Gee	2,191	7.8	+7.8
Greens	Andy Grodecki	1,970	7.0	−4.4
DS4SEQ	Russell Pata	193	0.7	+0.7
Independent	Richard Somers	166	0.6	+0.6
Total formal votes		28,230	98.1	
Informal votes		498	1.9	
Turnout		28,728	92.2	
Two-party-preferred result
Liberal National	Aidan McLindon	12,418	58.3	+2.4
Labor	Brett McCreadie	8,879	41.7	−2.4
Liberal National hold		Swing	+2.4	

== NSW State elections ==
=== 2011 ===
2011 New South Wales state election: Legislative Council
Party	Candidate	Votes	%	±%
Quota		185,274		
Liberal/National Coalition	1. Mike Gallacher (Lib) (elected 1); 2. Duncan Gay (Nat) (elected 4); 3. Greg Pearce (Lib) (elected 7); 4. David Clarke (Lib) (elected 9); 5. Rick Colless (Nat) (elected 11); 6. Scot MacDonald (Lib) (elected 13); 7. Catherine Cusack (Lib) (elected 14); 8. Natasha Maclaren-Jones (Lib) (elected 15); 9. Peter Phelps (Lib) (elected 16); 10. Niall Blair (Nat) (elected 17); 11. Sarah Johnston (Nat) (elected 21); 12. Henson Liang (Lib); 13. Andy Heath (Lib); 14. Lili Gestakovska (Lib); 15. Ben Tyson (Nat)	1,943,246	47.68	+13.46
Labor	1. Eric Roozendaal (elected 2); 2. Greg Donnelly (elected 5); 3. Penny Sharpe (elected 8); 4. Peter Primrose (elected 10); 5. Tony Kelly (elected 12); 6. Andrew Ferguson; 7. Natalie Bradbury; 8. Ernest Wong; 9. Nizza Siano; 10. Sue Fletcher; 11. Alexandra Cowan; 12. Richard SMolenski; 13. Glenn Kolomeitz; 14. Michelle Miran; 15. Anna Minns; 16. John Knight; 17. John Rumble; 18. Kien Ly	967,242	23.73	−15.41
Greens	1. David Shoebridge (elected 3); 2. Jan Barham (elected 6); 3. Jeremy Buckingham (elected 20); 4. Lesa de Leau; 5. Chris Harris; 6. Brami Jegatheeswaran; 7. Terri Latella; 8. Brian Mason; 9. Lynne Saville; 10. Leonard Chin; 11. Catherine Moore; 12. Bronislava Lee; 13. Alex Surace; 14. Anne Marett; 15. Anthony Petrolo; 16. Jan Davis; 17. Melissa Brooks; 18. Jason Koh; 19. Pauline Tyrrell; 20. Joel Macrae; 21. Sandra Heilpern	453,125	11.12	+2.00
Shooters and Fishers	1. Robert Brown (elected 18); 2. Jim Muirhead; 3. Max Castle; 4. Pauline Smith; 5. Tony McManus; 6. Al McGlashan; 7. Col Allison; 8. John Featherstone; 9. Steve Lee; 10. Alain Noujaim; 11. Kath Clapham; 12. Arthur Baker; 13. Darren Higgins; 14. Karl Houseman; 15. Peter Saunders; 16. Ron Wakem; 17. David Cook; 18. Bob Shaw	150,741	3.70	+0.90
Christian Democrats	1. Paul Green (elected 19); 2. Robyn Peebles; 3. Graham Freemantle; 4. Max Cracknell; 5. Elaine Nile; 6. Magdi Hanna; 7. Ian Smith; 8. Elwyn Sheppard; 9. David Fraser; 10. Anita Bird; 11. Eddie Cropper; 12. Michelle Green; 13. Trisha Ellis; 14. Devon Chapman; 15. Graeme Young; 16. Bruce Watson; 17. Diana Thew; 18. Gamil Heimy-Kostandy; 19. Soon-Hyung Kwon; 20. Ula Falanga	127,233	3.12	−1.30
Independent	1. Pauline Hanson; 2. Brian Burston; 3. Graham Abel; 4. Kate McCulloch; 5. David Taylor; 6. Alan Cronin; 7. Michael Parsons; 8. Rosalyn Wright; 9. John Cantwell; 10. Ed Farnsworth; 11. Sharon Elwell; 12. Andy Frew; 13. David Seccombe; 14. Stephen Mulcahy; 15. Kenneth Dibsdale; 16. Bev Wallis	98,043	2.41	+2.41
Family First	1. Gordon Moyes; 2. Phil Lamb; 3. Gregory Swane; 4. Joseph Mack; 5. Ken Duncan; 6. John Millard; 7. Sam Habashy; 8. Graham Guy; 9. Richard Menteith; 10. Nett Knox; 11. Grace Sham; 12. Nancy Piggott; 13. Patricia Giles; 14. Arnold Gorrell; 15. Wayne Koivu; 16. Ken Scott; 17. Gavin Brett; 18. Johnny Teong; 19. Rejieli Flexman	59,640	1.46	+1.46
Fishing Party	1. Bob Smith; 2. Elizabeth Stocker; 3. Chris Goodbar; 4. Deanne Shepherd; 5. Russell Bond; 6. Bob Sieber; 7. Ted Mackay; 8. Vicki Johns; 9. Stewart Paterson; 10. Kevin Johnson; 11. Brian Sutton; 12. Alison Johnstone; 13. Paul Derrick; 14. Adrian Callaghan; 15. Michael O'Connor; 16. Frank Bills; 17. Craig McCartney; 18. Margaret Hare; 19. Rowan Phelps; 20. David Hitchcock; 21. Matthew Small	54,253	1.33	−0.20
Independent	1. John Hatton; 2. Ian Scandrett; 3. John McInerney; 4. Tony Brown; 5. David Swan; 6. Mike King; 7. Debra Wales; 8. Sandra Wilson; 9. Peter Cipollone; 10. Joe Nagy; 11. Dianne Allen; 12. Edgar Azzopardi; 13. Julie Head; 14. Darren Boehm; 15. Deborah Richards; 16. Chris Gibson; 17. John Stephens; 18. Alan Hunt; 19. Lindsay Fuller; 20. Mark Corrigan; 21. Meg Bishop	52,514	1.29	+1.29
No Parking Meters	1. Charles Matthews; 2. Robert Morris; 3. David Johnson; 4. Sirena Beveridge; 5. Troy Seelin; 6. Caroline Schlee; 7. Dale Ayshford; 8. Helen Patterson; 9. Robert Braid; 10. Joyce McDonnell; 11. Kevin Barron; 12. John Fleming; 13. Michael Morrisey; 14. Susan Bisaro; 15. John Shaw; 16. Louise Morrisey; 17. Carol Matthews; 18. Carolyn Beveridge	49,429	1.21	+1.21
Democrats	1. Arthur Chesterfield-Evans; 2. Ronaldo Villaver; 3. Dean Winter; 4. Glenn Luxford; 5. Brett Paterson; 6. Casey Balk; 7. Pamela Clifford; 8. Robert McFarlane; 9. Perry Garofani; 10. Carolyn Hastie; 11. John Haydon; 12. Georgina Johanson; 13. Mayo Materazzo; 14. Julia Melland; 15. David Robinson; 16. Carol Prendergast; 17. Jaeme Serpanchy; 18. Samantha Elliott-Halls	34,046	0.84	−0.95
Outdoor Recreation	1. David Leyonhjelm; 2. Peter Whelan; 3. Martin Walsh; 4. Fay Destry; 5. Ian Best; 6. James Whelan; 7. Jennifer Rose; 8. John Phibbs; 9. Bob Hennessy; 10. Angelique Pettett; 11. Virginia Kruse; 12. Lucy Gabb; 13. Jason Kent; 14. Graham Nickols; 15. Robert Dolphin; 16. Janos Beregszaszi	31,279	0.77	+0.20
Restore the Workers' Rights	1. Barry Gissell; 2. Clifford Waiford; 3. Amanda Goodwin; 4. Jody Gissell; 5. Toni Griffis; 6. Peter Squires; 7. Anthony Adams; 8. Donna Adams; 9. Irene Wilson; 10. Maureen Cross; 11. Amanda Radburn; 12. Yvonne King; 13. David McCabe; 14. Kelly Slater; 15. Rodney Slater	17,661	0.43	−0.49
Save Our State	1. Tony Recsei; 2. Monica Wangmann; 3. Gordon Hocking; 4. Ted Webber; 5. Jean Posen; 6. John Ward; 7. Barry Hadaway; 8. Colin Freeman; 9. Rosemary Hadaway; 10. Tony Meaney; 11. Tanya Wood; 12. Margaretha van Gennip; 13. Jennifer Bennett; 14. Pat Cameron; 15. Mary Minns; 16. Allan Butt; 17. Hugh Knox; 18. Robert Hochmann	13,579	0.33	+0.02
Socialist Alliance	1. Peter Boyle; 2. Jess Moore; 3. Luis Almario; 4. Susan Prince; 5. Ibrahim Barssi; 6. Bea Bielle; 7. Raul Bassi; 8. Simon Cunich; 9. Rachel Evans; 10. Ross Geary; 11. John Coleman; 12. Steve O'Brien; 13. Kate Ausburn; 14. Patrick Harrison; 15. Federico Fuentes; 16. Luis Olaya; 17. Jill Hickson; 18. Duroyan Fertl; 19. Stefan Skibicki; 20. Terry Townsend; 21. Simon Butler	10,619	0.26	−0.14
Building Australia	1. Ray Brown; 2. Michael O'Donnell; 3. Liz Tomlinson; 4. John Fransen; 5. Maureen Riordan; 6. Alan Smith; 7. Louise Williams; 8. Ross Trovato; 9. Shiyun Chen; 10. John Zhang; 11. Kieron Farrell; 12. John Baiada; 13. Domenic Cammareri; 14. John White; 15. Robert Pickett; 16. John Vellenga; 17. Brett Walter; 18. Ron Gattone	9,058	0.22	+0.22
Independent	James Liu	1,220	0.03	+0.03
Independent	Ramsay Nuthall	612	0.02	+0.02
Independent	Huw Campbell	465	0.01	+0.01
Independent	Darren Marton	446	0.01	+0.01
Independent	June Esposito	208	0.01	+0.01
Independent	Danny Lim	192	0.00	0.00
Independent	Kyrsty MacDonald	189	0.00	0.00
Independent	Ben Smith	187	0.00	0.00
Independent	Richard Stanton	157	0.00	0.00
Independent	Jennifer Stefanac	119	0.00	0.00
Independent	Robert Peake	103	0.00	0.00
Independent	Stuart Baanstra	88	0.00	0.00
Independent	Phil Douglas	71	0.00	0.00
Independent	Lindsay Bignell	57	0.00	0.00
Independent	Alan Francis	57	0.00	0.00
Independent	Frank Monte	52	0.00	0.00
Independent	John Tullis	49	0.00	0.00
Independent	Bruce Manefield	44	0.00	0.00
Total formal votes		4,076,024	94.65	+0.76
Informal votes		230,260	5.35	−0.76
Turnout		4,306,285	92.89	+0.10

=== 2003 ===
2003 New South Wales state election: Legislative Council
Party	Candidate	Votes	%	±%
Quota		169,158		
Labor	1. Michael Egan (elected 1); 2. Carmel Tebbutt (elected 4); 3. Michael Costa (elected 6); 4. Ian West (elected 8); 5. Tony Kelly (elected 10); 6. Peter Primrose (elected 12); 7. Tony Burke (elected 14); 8. Christine Robertson (elected 16); 9. Kayee Griffin (elected 17); 10. Tony Catanzariti (elected 20); 11. Alison Peters; 12. Warren Mundine; 13. Pierre Esber; 14. Sophie Cotsis; 15. Lois Boswell; 16. Linda Kirgan; 17. Gerald Ng; 18. Carly Learson	1,620,190	43.54	+6.27
Liberal/National Coalition	1. Mike Gallacher (elected 2); 2. Duncan Gay (elected 5); 3. Greg Pearce (elected 7); 4. David Clarke (elected 9); 5. Rick Colless (elected 11); 6. Catherine Cusack (elected 13); 7. Robyn Parker (elected 15); 8. Gerald Anderson; 9. Robert Hansen; 10. Rachel Creek; 11. Avis Kennedy; 12. David Poole; 13. Terence Tang; 14. Michael Darby; 15. Jeff Herdegen; 16. Coral Slattery; 17. Elizabeth Hill; 18. Deal Gillespie; 19. Nick De Stefani	1,239,107	33.30	+5.91
Greens	1. Ian Cohen (elected 3); 2. Sylvia Hale (elected 18); 3. Carol Berry; 4. Jan Davis; 5. John Kaye; 6. Emelia Holdaway; 7. Mithra Cox; 8. Jeff Poole; 9. Imogen Schoots; 10. Alison Lyssa; 11. Philip Myers; 12. Judy Greenwood; 13. Wendy White; 14. Julie-Anne Richard; 15. Margaret Henry; 16. Cathy Rytmeister; 17. James Diack; 18. Kylie Hitchman; 19. Susan Jarnason; 20. Mora Main; 21. Stewart Jackson	320,010	8.60	+5.69
Christian Democrats	1. Gordon Moyes (elected 19); 2. Ross Clifford; 3. Peter Walker; 4. Graham McLennan; 5. George Capsis; 6. Alasdair Webster; 7. Kevin Hume; 8. Gamil Helmy-Kostandy; 9. Shirley Grigg; 10. Elwyn Sheppard; 11. Donald Baker; 12. Barry Small; 13. Beverley Pitt; 14. Warwick Copeland; 15. Ruth Nannelli	112,865	3.03	−0.14
Shooters	1. John Tingle (elected 21); 2. Robert Brown; 3. Dan Field; 4. Suzanne O'Connell; 5. Robyn Bourke; 6. Jo Hall; 7. Joan Maraldo; 8. Don Stewart; 9. Jenny Coates; 10. Ali Ambs; 11. Roger Thwaites; 12. Kenneth Moore; 13. Klaus Schwartz; 14. Dave Cook; 15. John Howden; 16. Janos Beregszaszi; 17. Dal Birrell; 18. Neil McCosker; 19. Colin Fraser; 20. Leon Belgrave; 21. Darryl Cheal	76,133	2.05	+0.38
Hanson Group	1. Pauline Hanson; 2. Trevor Clarke; 3. Zojka Cleary; 4. Peter Carver; 5. Peter Sayegh; 6. John Rose; 7. Ray Wallis; 8. Phillip Downey; 9. Colin Rogers; 10. Kay Earl; 11. Andy Frew; 12. Bill Healey; 13. Marian Hills; 14. Peter Fairall; 15. Noel Clarke; 16. Mark Marinkovich; 17. Michael Kordek	71,368	1.92	+1.92
Democrats	1. James Lantry; 2. Peter Furness; 3. Nina Burridge; 4. Matthew Baird; 5. Vicki Dimond; 6. Peter Zakrzewski; 7. Scilla Rosenberg; 8. Harry Boyle; 9. Pamela Clifford; 10. Sandy King; 11. Brian Day; 12. Theo Phillip; 13. Mary De Merindol; 14. Kate Botting; 15. Julian Swallow; 16. Carolyn McLean; 17. Roy Day; 18. Brenda Padgett; 19. Robyn Kirk	58,494	1.57	−2.44
One Nation NSW	1. Brian Burston; 2. Graham Burston; 3. John Cantwell; 4. Mark Booth; 5. Rosalyn Wright; 6. Stuart McBeth; 7. Kevin Bristow; 8. James O'Brien; 9. Ricky Bailey; 10. Larissa Bailey; 11. Lyn Stackman; 12. Tristen Peden; 13. Edwin Farnsworth; 14. Patricia Vaughan; 15. Sylvia Haley; 16. Jillian Burnage	55,396	1.49	−4.85
Unity	1. Ernest Wong; 2. Hanh Nguyen; 3. Robert Donnelly; 4. Victoria Paramonov; 5. Silma Ihram; 6. Shan Chin Su; 7. Melanie Vere; 8. Vannara Kim; 9. Jason Pham; 10. Parkcie Lam; 11. Thi Nga Tran; 12. Kam Leung; 13. Michael Tongsumrith; 14. Kit Fok; 15. Ping Law; 16. Wayne Yip; 17. Bich Le; 18. Nghiep Lu	52,979	1.42	+0.44
Fishing/Horse Riders/4WD	1. Robert Smith; 2. Glenn Druery; 3. Ruth Green; 4. Frank Sanzari; 5. David Wiseman; 6. Debra Avis; 7. Philip Gilham; 8. Stewart Paterson; 9. Fiona Meller; 10. David Bennis; 11. Deanne Shepherd; 12. Wendy Smallwood; 13. Dean Carpenter; 14. David Hitchcock; 15. Michelle Carpenter; 16. Steven Kaskaniotis; 17. Michael Butcher; 18. Graham Crossley; 19. Antonio Gabrielle; 20. Phillip Bell; 21. Chris Hodgson	39,315	1.06	+0.85
AAFI	1. Janey Woodger; 2. David Kitson; 3. Edwin Woodger; 4. Ken O'Leary; 5. Bob Girvan; 6. Peter James; 7. Frank Corrigan; 8. Roy Butler; 9. Hugh Watkins; 10. Craig Jeffriess; 11. Rex Dobson; 12. John Campbell; 13. Paul Higgins; 14. Tom Moody; 15. Kenneth Spragg	33,409	0.90	+0.59
Save Our Suburbs	1. Tony Recsei; 2. Noel Plumb; 3. Jean Lennane; 4. Marga Van Gennip; 5. Giselle Mawer; 6. Rex Hill; 7. Ross Collins; 8. June Hefferan; 9. Pat Hancock; 10. Hugh Bennett; 11. Colin Audet; 12. Monica Wangmann; 13. Jean Posen; 14. Leigh Wallbank; 15. Carolyn O'Connell; 16. Leanne Gavagna; 17. Andrew Rider; 18. Bernard Laughlan; 19. Mary Minns; 20. Colin Freeman; 21. Ann Mills	18,033	0.48	+0.48
Legal System Reform	1. Ahmed Sokarno; 2. Mike Davis; 3. Valerie Murphy; 4. Antoinette Housego; 5. Wayne Lawrence; 6. Terry Hines; 7. Janette Warby; 8. Catherine Byrne; 9. Maree Breen; 10. Pam Laidler; 11. Elizabeth Thomas; 12. Arthur Kraulis; 13. Gustav Herstik; 14. Gordon The; 15. Terry Bell	9,644	0.26	−0.74
No Privatisation People's Party	1. Samir Bargashoun; 2. Mohammed Daher; 3. Mohamed Derbas; 4. Nivin El Kassir; 5. Maisa Samman; 6. Hussein El-Massri; 7. Mark Ekermawi; 8. Hala Sangari; 9. Mervet Abdallah; 10. Omar Samman; 11. Steven Ajaj; 12. Mariam Berbas; 13. Jennifer Lozi; 14. Norm Chalak; 15. Leila Hbous; 16. Steven Alameddine; 17. Fayez Mahfoud; 18. Ahmad Haddad; 19. Mahmoud Rashid; 20. Ahmed Ibrahim	6,652	0.18	+0.12
Socialist Alliance	1. Lisa Macdonald; 2. John Morris; 3. Raul Bassi; 4. Angela Budai; 5. Jamal Darwand; 6. Naomi Arrowsmith; 7. Darcy Byrne; 8. Michael Schembri; 9 . Karol Florek; 10. Pip Hinman; 11. Kieran Latty; 12. Margaret Perrott; 13. Kylie Witt; 14. John Percy; 15. Ashisha Cunningham; 16. Geoff Payne; 17. Osama Yousif; 18. Angela Luvera; 19. Kim Bullimore; 20. Stephen O'Brien; 21. Jim Knight	5,428	0.15	+0.15
Independent	Alexandra Rivers	874	0.02	+0.02
Independent	Mary Mockler	634	0.02	+0.02
Independent	Michael Middleton	313	0.01	+0.01
Independent	Brian Ellis	261	0.01	+0.01
Independent	Ivor F	249	0.01	0.00
Independent	Peter Consandine	56	0.01	+0.01
Independent	Simon Mitchell	47	0.01	+0.01
Total formal votes		3,721,457	94.66	+1.83
Informal votes		209,851	5.34	−1.83
Turnout		3,931,308	92.02	−1.11
