= Pauline Hanson: Please Explain! =

2016 Australian documentary

- Directed by: Anna Broinowski
- Starring: Pauline Hanson
- Narrated by: Tara Morice
- Country of origin: Australia
- Original language: English

Production
- Producer: Anna Broinowski
- Cinematography: Luke Peterson
- Editor: Nikki Stevens
- Running time: 77 minutes

Original release
- Release: 31 July 2016

Pauline Hanson: Please Explain! is a 2016 political documentary television film directed by Anna Broinowski exploring the history of the Australian political figure Pauline Hanson and the One Nation party as well as the controversy and debate in which both have been surrounded. The documentary features critics, commentators and former advisors, as well as archival footage.

The documentary premiered on the Special Broadcasting Service (SBS) in Australia shortly after Hanson's election to the Australian senate at the 2016 federal election. The documentary was funded by Screen Australia and Screen NSW.

== Featured people ==
- Pauline Hanson
- Marcia Langton
- Helen Sham-Ho
- Alan Jones
- John Howard
- Neville Roach AO
- Linda Burney
- Tracey Curro
- David Oldfield
- Margo Kingston
- John Pasquarelli
- Thiam Ang
- David Ettridge

== Reception ==
The Guardian reviewed the documentary, saying that "We need Hanson exposed for what she is and what she's for, and that's what Broinowski’s documentary does so well: it illuminates a hare-brained and bizarre woman, and the political cynics who direct her."

The New Daily published an analysis of the program by Denise Eriksen, writing that "it’s one of the best television programmes you are likely to see all year."

Hanson livestreamed herself watching and commenting upon the documentary, stating that many of her critics misunderstood her comments due to her always being under public scrutiny. Mashable remarked upon Hanson's stream, dubbed the "Pauline Hanson 'social media echo chamber'" by The Sydney Morning Herald, which they felt was "the weirdest thing you'll see on the internet all day".

== See also ==
- Politics of Australia
