= David Oldfield (politician) =

Australian politician (born 1958)

Leader of One Nation NSW
- In office 8 October 2000 – 20 March 2004
- Deputy: Brian Burston
- Preceded by: Party created
- Succeeded by: Judith Newson

National Director of One Nation
- In office 11 April 1997 – 4 October 2000; Alongside David Ettridge
- President: Pauline Hanson
- Preceded by: Party established; office created
- Succeeded by: Brian Burston

Member of the New South Wales Legislative Council
- In office 27 March 1999 – 24 March 2007

Alderman of Manly Council
- In office September 1991 – August 1998

One Nation Chief of Staff
- In office April 1996 – 4 October 2000
- President: Pauline Hanson
- Preceded by: John Pasquarelli
- Succeeded by: Cheyenne MacLeod

Personal details
- Born: David Ernest Oldfield; 25 June 1958 (age 68) Manly, New South Wales, Australia
- Party: Independent (2000–2001; 2004–present)
- Other political affiliations: Liberal (before 1990–1997); One Nation (1997–2000); One Nation New South Wales (2000–2004)
- Relations: Edward Oldfield (uncle); See Oldfield family
- Education: Balgowlah Boys' School
- Occupation: Sporting retail company director (Fathom Pty Ltd); Talkback radio host (2UE, 2GB)
- Profession: Businessman politician journalist
- Website: Official website

David Ernest Oldfield (born 25 June 1958) is an Australian former politician who co-founded and was national director of the Pauline Hanson's One Nation party.

Oldfield was initially involved in politics as a member of Manly Council, a Liberal candidate for Manly and a political advisor to then–Liberal Party minister (and future Prime Minister of Australia), Tony Abbott. He later became acquainted with parliamentary newcomer Pauline Hanson, who in the wake of her election to the Australian House of Representatives gained notoriety for comments about Indigenous Australians, Asians, immigration and multiculturalism. While working for Abbott, Oldfield began to construct Pauline Hanson's One Nation. One Nation was formed in 1997, and Oldfield was appointed an informal deputy leader, serving with David Ettridge.

The structural basis of One Nation was orchestrated solely by Ettridge and Oldfield, who acted as the policy masterminds behind Pauline Hanson's image and political style. However, in 2000 Oldfield was expelled from One Nation after a dispute with Hanson and formed the splinter group One Nation NSW, serving as its leader from its creation in 2000, to its dissolution in 2004.

Oldfield was a member of the New South Wales Legislative Council from 1999 to 2007, under One Nation, One Nation NSW and briefly as an independent twice. In 2006, Oldfield announced that he would not recontest the 2007 New South Wales election.

He formerly hosted radio programs on radio 2UE and radio 2GB. On 19 February 2018, David and wife Lisa joined the Australian version of I'm a Celebrity...Get Me Out of Here.

== Early life and education ==
David Oldfield is the 4th and youngest child of June Emma (c. 1930–present) and Ernest Radcliffe "Bill" Oldfield (1918–2008). His uncle, Edward Peate "Ted" Oldfield was a Member of the Western Australian Legislative Assembly from 1951 to 1965, representing Maylands between 1951 and 1956, Mount Lawley between 1956 and 1962, and Maylands again from 1962 to 1965. He first represented Maylands as a Liberal, before contesting Mount Lawley as an Independent, and returning to Maylands under Labor. His paternal grandparents, Lena Eva (née Peate) was a housewife, and Ernest Henry was a Commercial traveller.

Oldfield was born and raised in Manly, a beachside suburb of Sydney. His mother was a small business proprietor during Oldfield's childhood. His father, Ernest Oldfield, enlisted to serve in World War II. He joined the Australian Army in 1939 and was transferred to the Royal Australian Air Force in 1940. He was assigned to the No. 2 Squadron and achieved the rank of Flight lieutenant before becoming a prisoner of war when the Consolidated B-24 Liberator bomber carrying his crew crash landed due to engine complications, 20 yards off the coast of Sumba Island, Indonesia, where they were captured by Japanese forces on 27 April 1945. The crew was rescued and returned to Australia in 1946, and Ernest Oldfield was promoted to flight sergeant and was awarded a Distinguished Flying Medal for courage... In later years, Ernest Oldfield became the CEO of Samuel Taylor Pty Ltd, a pioneering company of the household goods industry in Australia (known for their creation of cleaning products such as Mr Sheen and Mortein).

== Business career, 1984–1993 ==
After graduating from Balgowah, Oldfield founded Fathom Dive Pty Ltd in 1984, a Sporting goods retailer specializing in water sports, based in Farlight near Manly Beach. Fathom was also a diving academy and operated recreational underwater diving expeditions, exploring underwater off the coast of New South Wales.

On 8 January 1988, a drowning occurred on the boat and the equipment hired from Fathom to explore of the wreck of the S.S. Annie M. Miller, near the Sydney South Head. His clients Dr. Andy Newman-Maurice and Richard Evans, who were holidaying in Sydney from Melbourne. Evans died during the exploration, and the Coroner's inquest found that it was an "accidental death by drowning". In September 1993, A court case was brought against Fathom by Evans' family in the Victorian Supreme Court. Oldfield represented himself, and after 11 days the jury was discharged by consent.

== Political career, 1990–2007 ==
=== Entry into politics (1990–1996) ===
By 1990, Oldfield was a member of the Liberal Party. He was elected an Alderman of the Manly Municipal Council in September 1991, and while his activity while on the Council remains largely unpublished and unknown, he was a known member of the Environmental Works Community Audit Committee (1993–1995) and the Fisher Road Special School Committee (1994–1996). When Pauline Hanson's One Nation was founded, Oldfield became the first representative of the party on a Local government level. He remained an Alderman of the Council until 1998 when he resigned to stand for the Australian Senate.

In April 1994, Oldfield was assigned to the parliamentary staff of Tony Abbott, who was appointed Parliamentary secretary to the Minister for Education (later becoming a senior Minister in the Howard government, and also Prime Minister of Australia from 2013 to 2015). Abbott had been elected at a March by-election that same year for the Division of Warringah, based in Manly. Abbott had approached Oldfield by phone to discuss his preselection for the seat and asked for Oldfield's influence in the Manly area to help Abbott secure this position. He later visited Oldfield's office to discuss further matters, which was likely to have involved Oldfield's position on Abbott's staff. When Abbott won the seat, he made Oldfield his principal advisor, which built Oldfield's influence in the Liberal Party.

In late 1994, Oldfield won the Liberal preselection for the electoral district of Manly. At the 1995 state election, Oldfield fell 243 votes short of winning the seat from independent Peter Macdonald. Despite the marginal number of votes required to win the seat, only a nominal swing of 0.3 was achieved. Oldfield received 16,433 votes (49.6%) in the two-party-preferred result, while Macdonald received 16,676 votes (50.4%) in the Two-party-preferred result. Oldfield did not contest the next preselection battle for the seat.

=== Rise to power (1996–1999) ===
Pauline Hanson was endorsed in November 1995 as the Liberal candidate for the Division of Oxley. She was elected to Parliament at the 1996 federal election as an Independent. Her maiden speech, outlining her right-wing views on race, her appeal to economically disadvantaged White Australians and her dissatisfaction with government policy on indigenous affairs had caught the attention of Oldfield.

==== Founding of One Nation ====
In September 1996, on the night of Hanson's maiden speech, Oldfield contacted Hanson to arrange a meeting at a Canberra tavern where they discussed how the growing support for Hanson would be handled. Oldfield, at this point, was still working for Tony Abbott. They continued their meetings, privately, for a number of weeks, which continued to an encounter in December 1996 at a Canberra motel, where they had sex. Oldfield had previously denied that he had engaged in sexual activities with Hanson until he conceded after a lie-detector test. However, he continues to deny that there was any 'romance'. After the affair, Oldfield publicly resigned from Tony Abbott's staff. John Pasquarelli, Hanson's Chief of Staff and Principal Adviser since March 1996, was fired, and Oldfield took his position.

Oldfield had previously been in contact with David Ettridge, a professional fundraiser from Adelaide, discussing the prospect of establishing a political party. In February 1997, in a meeting at a Sydney hotel, Oldfield, Ettridge, and Hanson came to the agreement that a political party would be formed.

The name 'One Nation' was chosen to signify their aim of national unity in Australia, reflecting Hanson's view that the country was becoming increasingly divided by government policies which supposedly favoured migrants and Aboriginal Australians. The term had previously been used for an economic program created by Labor Prime Minister Paul Keating in 1992. The policies strengthening relations with Asia, the Free Market, and social welfare were the opposite of that of Pauline Hanson's One Nation.

===== Early electoral success =====
On 11 April 1997, Pauline Hanson's One Nation was launched in Ipswich, Queensland, in the George Hogg Auditorium of the Ipswich Civic Centre, filled to capacity with over 400 party faithful. The launch was also attended by supporters of the Australian Democrats, Labor and the Coalition, and was notably attended by Paul Filing, the Independent Member for Moore, Western Australia, who considered joining the party. Several executive members, including Oldfield, Ettridge, and Hanson received a police escort into the venue, due to the demonstration of over 200 protesters, led by Ipswich City Councillor Paul Tully. Most protesters were involved in left-wing student politics at Griffith University. In her speech, Hanson spoke out against the racial discrimination policy in Australia, religious monasticism, and addressed the danger of a civil war in Australia, fabricated through racial division and inequality.

By October 1997, an A C Nielsen-McNair poll showed that 27% of Queensland voters would vote for One Nation, and a national poll showed that the party could win up to 12 Senate seats.

Both Oldfield and Ettridge went to extreme lengths to secure the party's survival, forcing members to prematurely sign resignation forms, disendorsing anyone who refused to do so, as well as disendorsing members who disagreed with the party constitution. Due to this behaviour, perceived as almost authoritarian, the Australian public came to view Hanson as a puppet, and that Oldfield and Ettridge held the true power within the party.

===== 1998 Queensland election =====
One Nation achieved its peak of support in the 1998 Queensland state election. By October 1997, an A C Nielsen-McNair poll showed that 27% of Queensland voters would vote for One Nation. The party won 22.7% of the vote, behind only Labor, winning 11 seats in the unicameral Legislative Assembly in the June 1998 election. In terms of first-preference votes, One Nation received more than either the Liberals or Nationals; its vote share was high enough to render any attempt to calculate a two-party preferred vote meaningless. However, since One Nation's vote was spread out across the state, this was only good enough for 11 of 89 seats and fourth place in the legislature (behind Labor, the Liberals, and Nationals). This was still enough to deny Labor a majority, as seven of One Nation's seats would have gone to Labor if not for leakage of Coalition preferences. Queensland Labor leader Peter Beattie secured 45-seat majority and the premiership with the vote of Independent Peter Wellington.

However, in November of the same year, One Nation MLA Charles Rappolt resigned from parliament due to increasing media pressure against him, after his partner sought legal action due to spousal abuse. This triggered a by-election in the seat of Mulgrave, which was won by Labor's Warren Pitt, allowing them to secure a majority in their own right.

Besides the Rappolt resignation, the support for One Nation continued uninterrupted until early 1999.

==== Deputy president; leading One Nation in New South Wales ====
Oldfield, from the launch of the party, was its state leader in New South Wales, and was the vice president of the party federally, alongside David Ettridge. Oldfield became the sole vice president when Ettridge left the party in early 2000 to return to the private sector. He was the lead senate candidate in New South Wales for One Nation at the 1998 federal election, where he fell short of achieving the quota required. Nationally, One Nation gained 8.99 percent of the Senate vote and 8.4% of the Representatives vote, but only one MP was elected – Len Harris (politician) as a Senator for Queensland. Heather Hill had been elected to this position, but the High Court of Australia ruled that, although she was an Australian citizen, she was ineligible for election to sit as a Senator because she had not renounced her British citizenship, which the court assumed she possessed because she had been born in Britain.

Oldfield's deputy leader in New South Wales was Brian Burston, who became a senator from New South Wales at the 2016 federal election for One Nation.

===== 1999 New South Wales election =====
At the 1999 New South Wales state election, Oldfield was elected to the New South Wales Legislative Council, where One Nation achieved 6.34% of the vote and narrowly missing out winning a second seat (contested by Brian Burston). This was the only seat in the New South Wales Parliament that the party secured. It was their first seat ever held in New South Wales.

=== Member of the Legislative Council (1999–2007) ===
Oldfield took office in the Legislative Council after the state election. He worked most notably on the General Purpose Standing Committee No. 4 (2003–2007). His maiden speech outlined the future course of action that One Nation would take, and spoke of invigorating the Australian community to support this.

In 2003 and 2006, Oldfield moved a bill for a Referendum on Death Penalty.

==== Expulsion from One Nation ====
The popularity of One Nation began to decline after the 1998 federal election, in which Pauline Hanson lost her seat and only one senator was elected. An electoral redistribution essentially split Oxley (Hanson's constituency) in half. Oxley was reconfigured as a marginal Labor seat, while a new seat of Blair was created in the rural area surrounding Ipswich. Hanson knew her chances of holding the reconfigured Oxley were slim, especially after former Labor state premier Wayne Goss won preselection for the seat.

Hanson launched her 1998 election campaign with a focus on jobs, rather than a focus on race/ethnicity or on "the people" against "the elites". Instead, Hanson focused on unemployment and the need to create more jobs not through government schemes but by "cheap loans to business, by more apprenticeships, and by doing something about tariffs". She opted to contest Blair, where most of her support was now located. On paper, Blair was a very safe Liberal seat with a notional majority of 18.7 percent. Hanson won 36 percent of the primary vote, slightly over 10% more than her nearest rival. However, preferences were enough to elect the Liberal candidate, Cameron Thompson, who had been third in the primary vote. Because all three major parties directed their preferences to each other ahead of Hanson, Thompson overtook the Labor candidate on National preferences and defeated Hanson on Labor preferences.

At the 2000 One Nation New South Wales State Conference, Hanson accused Oldfield of abusing his authority, usurping power and setting up alternative political parties under his control. His expulsion created even more instability in a party which was constantly embroiled in scandal and internal strife and the party saw a split in its New South Wales division, as well as earlier in Queensland and later in Western Australia.

==== One Nation New South Wales ====
As a result of his expulsion from the original party, Oldfield formed One Nation New South Wales in 2001. The new party took advantage of electoral party registration laws to register itself as a political party under the ‘One Nation’ name with the NSW electoral commission, and achieved registration in April 2002. The effect of this was that the original Pauline Hanson's One Nation was now unable to gain registration for New South Wales state elections, and therefore any candidates which that party chose to represent them at state elections could not use the party name. Consequently, One Nation could only contest federal elections in New South Wales, whilst the Oldfield group could only contest state elections in New South Wales.

One Nation NSW encountered some internal ruptures in 2002 and 2003 during the preselection process for the March 2003 New South Wales election. Brian Burston had been preselected by a party conference in December 2002 for 1st place on the party ticket, for the election to the Upper House, the Legislative Council. Oldfield however, had intended that his wife, Lisa, secure this position. He, therefore, summoned a second meeting of party members in January 2003, which saw a reversal of the December decision to give Burston the top spot on the ticket, in favour of Lisa Oldfield. Burston and his supporters filed legal action, and the court upheld the initial party decision of December, which gave Burston the leading position on the ticket.

At the March election, One Nation New South Wales achieved only 1.5% of the primary vote, compared to 6.3% for One Nation in the previous 1999 election that saw Oldfield elected. This result was substantially below the 4.55% election quota, and consequently, Burston failed to get elected. Apart from the internal feuding which affected the party's performance, was the fact that Pauline Hanson also ran in the election as a grouped independent, with support from what was left of One Nation, and this fractured the One Nation vote. Hanson polled slightly better than Burston's group, achieving 1.9%, and narrowly missed gaining the last Legislative Council spot.

Since the 2003 state election, One Nation New South Wales kept a very low profile. The party did not maintain a website and drew very little media attention. Oldfield resigned from the party in December 2004, to serve the remainder of his term as an independent.

==== Resignation from Parliament ====
In 2006, Oldfield announced that he would not contest the next state election. His term expired on 24 March 2007.

One Nation New South Wales, led by Judith Newson, met all the necessary registration criteria to achieve registration for the March 2007 NSW election. However, the party decided not to contest that election, and was deregistered shortly after the election.

== Media career, 2007–2018 ==
In 2006, he was a contestant on Australia's Celebrity Survivor. His performance as a player on the show, he was the 4th best Australian Survivor player among first four editions of the show by The OZ Network.

Oldfield commenced as a talkback radio host with Sydney radio station 2GB in November 2007. In 2009, Oldfield became the highest rating radio presenter in Sydney with 25.2% of the overnight audience. In 2010, Oldfield was fired by 2GB.

In May 2010, he began hosting the afternoon shift as a relief presenter on 2UE. After three days, Oldfield was suspended by the station for making inflammatory remarks with respect to asylum seekers. In his on-air comments, Oldfield suggested an immigration policy whereby:

"We'll turn on the electric fences, we'll stop them from coming, and the ones that are here: we'll make sure they can't escape, and if they do try it, they'll be fried."

In December 2010, Oldfield replaced Steve Liebmann as the host of the Mornings program on 2UE.

In April 2012, Oldfield moved from the Mornings program to present Nights on 2UE.

In November 2016, Oldfield appeared on the SBS television program First Contact, a series that takes a group of Australians who have had limited contact with indigenous people and brings them into contact with them. In the first episode he stated that Aboriginal culture "should have died out, like the Stone Age died out". He also expressed the view that the Australian constitution is not racist for omitting mention of Aboriginal or Torres Strait Islander people. He also was seen making an emotional connection with an indigenous man over something they had in common; the death of their fathers.

In 2017, Oldfield appeared as a celebrity contestant on the Australian version of Hell's Kitchen.

In 2018, Oldfield appeared as a celebrity contestant on the Australian version of I'm A Celebrity, Get Me Out of Here, alongside his wife Lisa.

== Personal life ==
Oldfield was married to Lisa Oldfield, who was 16 years his junior. She was a former co-host of Channel 9's daytime television program, The Catch-Up, and a castmate on The Real Housewives of Sydney. In 2010 the couple had their first child, and a second in 2012. The couple split in 2019.

In the documentary Pauline Hanson: Please Explain!, Oldfield describes himself as "not a fan of multiculturalism".

Oldfield's ex-wife Lisa describes herself as a 21% Native American in ancestry.
