= United Australia Party (disambiguation) =

The United Australia Party was the major conservative party in Australia from 1931 to 1945.

United Australia Party may also refer to:

- The Queensland branch of the above United Australia Party.
- United Australia Party (1997), a defunct political party in South Australia.
- Pauline's United Australia Party, a defunct political party led by Pauline Hanson.
- United Australia Party (2013), an extant political party led by Clive Palmer.
