= Brian Burston =

Australian politician (born 1948)

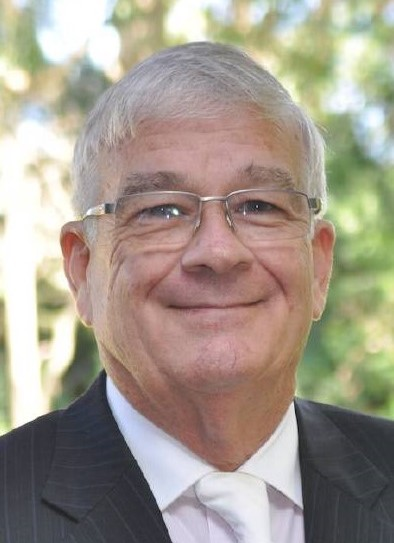

Leader of One Nation New South Wales
- In office 31 March 2010 – 17 June 2018
- Preceded by: Judith Newson
- Succeeded by: Mark Latham

Party Whip of One Nation in the Senate
- In office 30 August 2016 – 24 May 2018
- Succeeded by: Peter Georgiou

Senator for New South Wales
- In office 2 July 2016 – 30 June 2019

Leader of the United Australia Party in the Senate
- In office 18 June 2018 – 30 June 2019
- Leader: Clive Palmer
- Preceded by: Glenn Lazarus
- Succeeded by: Ralph Babet

Deputy Leader of Pauline's United Australia Party
- In office 24 May 2007 – 31 March 2010
- Leader: Pauline Hanson
- Preceded by: Party created
- Succeeded by: Party dissolved

National Director of One Nation
- In office 4 October 2000 – 5 August 2002; Alongside David Ettridge
- Leader: John Fischer
- Preceded by: David Oldfield
- Succeeded by: Ian Nelson

Personal details
- Born: 25 February 1948 (age 78) Cessnock, New South Wales, Australia
- Party: United Australia (since 2018)
- Other political affiliations: One Nation NSW (2000–2004); Pauline's UAP (2007–2010); One Nation (1997–2000; 2010–2018)
- Education: Cessnock High School
- Alma mater: Hunter Institute of TAFE; Sydney Institute of TAFE; Sydney Teachers' College
- Occupation: Boilermaker; Draftsman; Politician

Brian Burston (born 25 February 1948) is a former Australian politician. He was a Senator for New South Wales from 2016 to 2019, originally representing One Nation. After falling out with party leader Pauline Hanson over company tax cuts, Burston left One Nation and joined businessman Clive Palmer's newly relaunched United Australia Party. Palmer announced Burston as the new parliamentary leader of the party on 18 June 2018, but Burston failed to win re-election at the 2019 federal election.

== Early life ==
Burston was born and grew up in Cessnock, New South Wales. He started an apprenticeship as a boilermaker with BHP when he was 15. He has taught at TAFE NSW, trained TAFE teachers at Newcastle University and worked as a contract draftsman. He was employed at the former Newcastle Teachers College.

He has been a councillor on Cessnock City Council. He married at the age of 22, had three children and later divorced. He married his second wife, a teacher named Rosie, in 2008. Their home overlooks Lake Macquarie.

Burston became a member of Pauline Hanson's One Nation soon after its inception. He is a former National Director of One Nation, having served alongside David Ettridge. In concert with the overthrow and imprisonment of Pauline Hanson, Burston left Pauline Hanson's One Nation and joined One Nation NSW, a splinter group of Pauline Hanson's One Nation, founded and led by David Oldfield. After Oldfield abandoned One Nation NSW, Burston rejoined Pauline Hanson's One Nation.

== Senator (2016–2019) ==
After Burston was elected to the Senate at the 2016 federal election, he was elected as One Nation's party whip.

In his maiden speech to parliament, Burston warned that large-scale immigration was undermining social cohesion, placing pressure on infrastructure and housing affordability and increasing crime in Australia. He also criticised "aggressive multiculturalism", stating:

It seems that every group pride is promoted in the media and schools except for ours, the nation's. The ABC long ago abandoned any semblance of patriotism, or even balance. Other taxpayer-funded media – SBS and NITV – serve immigrants and Indigenous Australians. The national flag is often ignored or dishonoured in schools, while multiculturalism and indigenous issues are now part of the curriculum. The majority of students are not supported in their Anglo-Australian identity, but are made to feel guilty for supposed historical injustices committed by their ancestors.

Burston is a public opponent of same-sex marriage, and was one of twelve senators who voted against what became the Marriage Amendment (Definition and Religious Freedoms) Act 2017. In 2017, he was one of ten senators to vote in favour of Cory Bernardi's motion to ban gender-selective abortion. It was defeated by ten votes to 36.

In May 2018, Burston announced he would support the Turnbull government's proposed corporate tax cuts, a move that contradicted One Nation policy. He was soon demoted from the role of party whip, and reportedly attempted to leave One Nation for the Shooters, Fishers and Farmers Party. On 18 June 2018, he told the Senate he had resigned from One Nation to sit as an independent, but later that day he announced that he would join Clive Palmer's United Australia Party, as party leader. He became part of the economically conservative voting bloc formed by crossbench Senators David Leyonhjelm, Cory Bernardi and Fraser Anning.

In February 2019, Burston accused Senator Pauline Hanson of sexual harassment, over an incident which occurred in 1998. Hanson denied the allegations. Burston was defeated at the 2019 federal election.
