= Pauline Hanson =

Australian politician (born 1954)

Senator Pauline Hanson
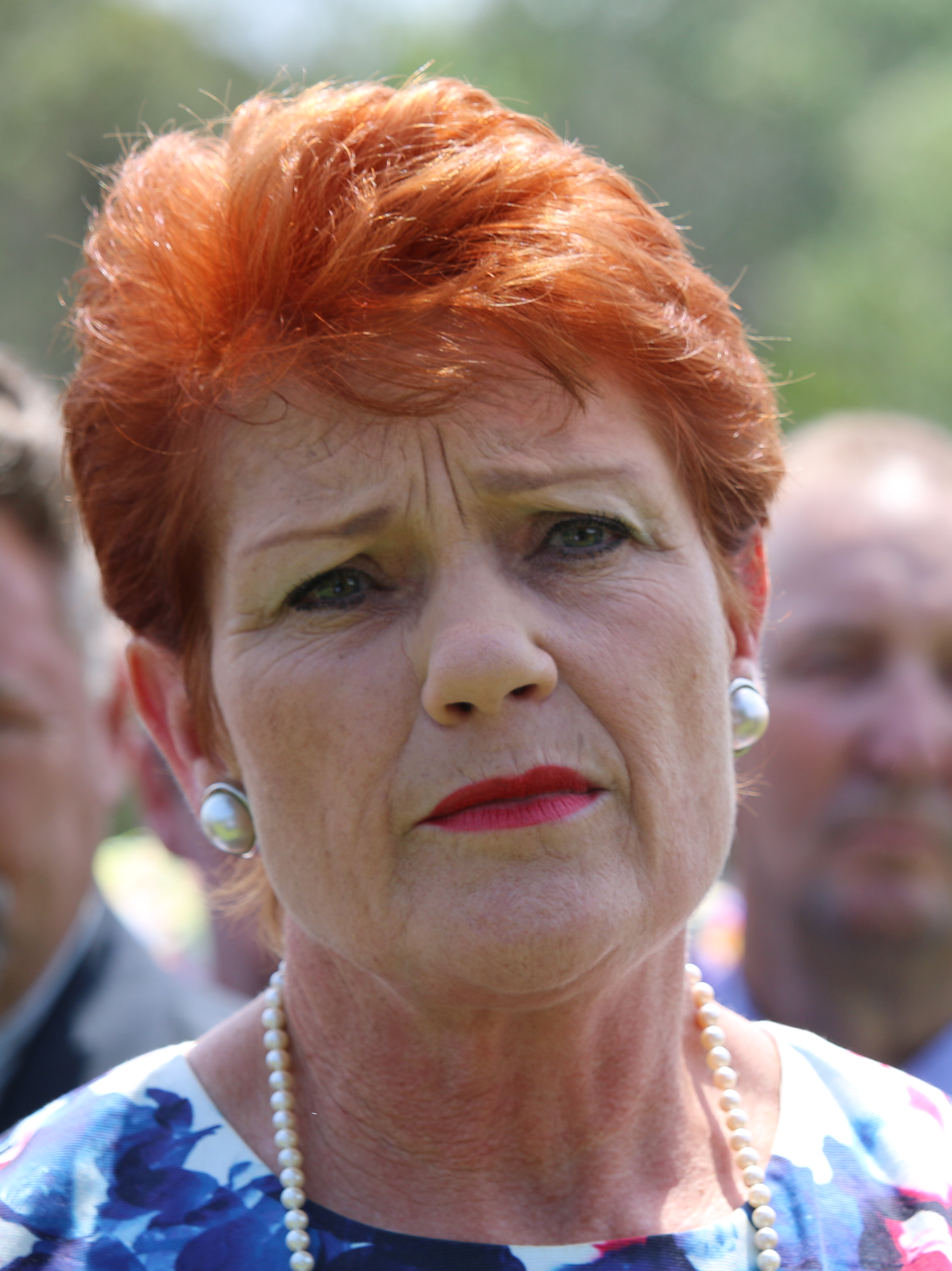
- Hanson in 2016

Senator for Queensland
- Incumbent
- Assumed office 2 July 2016
- Preceded by: Glenn Lazarus

Leader of One Nation
- Incumbent
- Assumed office 29 November 2014
- Preceded by: Jim Savage
- In office 11 April 1997 – 27 January 2002
- Preceded by: Party established
- Succeeded by: John Fischer

Leader of Pauline's United Australia Party
- In office 24 May 2007 – 31 March 2010
- Deputy: Brian Burston
- Preceded by: Party established
- Succeeded by: Party dissolved

Member of the Australian Parliament for Oxley
- In office 2 March 1996 – 3 October 1998
- Preceded by: Les Scott
- Succeeded by: Bernie Ripoll

Councillor of the Ipswich City Council for Division 7
- In office 3 April 1994 – 22 March 1995
- Preceded by: Paul Pisasale
- Succeeded by: Denise Hanly

Personal details
- Born: Pauline Lee Seccombe; 27 May 1954 (age 72) Brisbane, Queensland, Australia
- Party: One Nation (1997–2002, 2013–present)
- Other political affiliations: Independent (before 1995, 1996–1997, 2010–2013); Liberal (1995–1996); United Australia (2007–2010)
- Spouse(s): Walter Zagorski (divorced) Mark Hanson (m. 1980, divorced)
- Children: 4
- Pauline Hanson's voice Hanson speaking in January 2025
- Criminal information
- Status: Conviction overturned on appeal (2 months 17 days)
- Conviction: Electoral fraud
- Penalty: 3 years (2003)

Pauline Lee Hanson (née Seccombe, formerly Zagorski; born 27 May 1954) is an Australian politician who is the leader of One Nation. She has been a senator for Queensland since 2016, and was the member of Parliament (MP) for the Queensland division of Oxley from 1996 to 1998.

Born in Brisbane, Hanson worked in small businesses and was a councillor of Ipswich City Council, joining the Liberal Party in 1995. She was preselected as the Liberal candidate for the division of Oxley at the 1996 federal election, but was disendorsed by the party shortly before the election for her controversial comments about Aboriginal Australians. Hanson remained on the ballot paper as the Liberal candidate, winning the election to sit as an independent, before co-founding One Nation in 1997. She was unsuccessful in her re-election attempt at the 1998 election.

Hanson unsuccessfully contested the 2001 election as the leader of One Nation, but was expelled from the party in 2002. A District Court jury found Hanson guilty of electoral fraud in 2003, but her convictions were later overturned by the Queensland Court of Appeal. She spent 11 weeks in jail prior to the appeal being heard. Following her release, Hanson ran in several state and federal elections, as the leader of her United Australia Party and as an independent, before rejoining One Nation in 2013 and becoming leader again the following year. Narrowly defeated at the 2015 Queensland state election, she bounced back to get elected to the Senate at the 2016 election, along with three other members of the party. She was re-elected at the 2022 election.

Since 1996, Hanson has been widely characterised as radical right, far-right and right-wing populist. She has called for massive reductions in the number of migrants allowed into Australia, and has made controversial critical comments about Indigenous Australians, Asian Australians, Islam and African migrants. In 2017 and 2025, Hanson gained media attention for wearing a burqa into the Australian Senate. She was suspended from the Senate for seven days for the 2025 event.

== Early life and career ==
Hanson was born Pauline Lee Seccombe on 27 May 1954 in Woolloongabba, a suburb of Brisbane. She is the fifth of seven children and the youngest daughter of John Alfred "Jack" Seccombe and Hannorah Alousius Mary "Norah" Seccombe (née Webster). She first attended school at Buranda Girls' School, and then later Coorparoo State High School in Coorparoo which she left at age 15, shortly before her first marriage and pregnancy.

Jack and Norah Seccombe owned a fish and chip shop in Ipswich, Queensland, where Hanson and her siblings worked from a young age, preparing meals and taking orders. As she grew older, she helped keep the accounts.

Shortly after turning 16 years old in May 1970, Hanson (then Pauline Seccomb) met Walter Zagorski, who had immigrated to Australia from Poland. She soon became pregnant, and the couple married shortly thereafter, all before the end of the calendar year. The marriage was turbulent, marked by various extra-marital affairs on both sides, as well as at least one lengthy separation. She gave birth to sons Jay and Steven during the marriage, although Zagorski suspected that he was not Steven's father, a charge she denied.

In 1978, Hanson (then Pauline Zagorski) met Mark Hanson, a tradesman on Queensland's Gold Coast. They married in 1980, and established a construction business specialising in roof plumbing. Hanson ran the administrative side, while her husband handled the workforce. In 1987, the couple divorced and the company was liquidated. Hanson later bought a fish and chip shop with a new business partner, Morrie Marsden in Silkstone in Ipswich. The shop was sold upon her election to Parliament in 1996.

=== Entry into politics ===
Hanson's first election to political office was in 1994, when she won a seat on the Ipswich City Council. She ran on a platform opposing extra funding for a new library that would provide free public Internet access. Hanson held the seat for 11 months before being removed in 1995 due to administrative changes.

==== 1996 election ====
In August 1995, she joined the Liberal Party and in 1996 was endorsed as the Liberal candidate for the House of Representatives seat of Oxley, based on Ipswich, for the March 1996 federal election. The Labor incumbent, Les Scott, held it with an almost 15% two-party majority, making it the safest Labor seat in Queensland. Hanson was given little chance of winning the seat. However, Hanson received widespread media attention when, leading up to the election, she advocated the abolition of special government assistance for Aboriginal Australians, and she was subsequently disendorsed by the Liberal Party. Ballot papers had already been printed listing Hanson as the Liberal candidate, and the Australian Electoral Commission had closed nominations for the seat. As a result, Hanson was still listed as the Liberal candidate when votes were cast, even though Liberal leader John Howard had declared she would not be allowed to sit with the Liberals if elected.

On election night, Hanson took a large lead on the first count and picked up enough preferences from Democrat voters to defeat Scott on the sixth count. Her victory came amid Labor's near-collapse in Queensland, which saw it reduced to only two seats in the state. Hanson won 54% of the two-candidate-preferred vote. Had she still been running as a Liberal, the 19.3-point swing would have been the largest two-party swing of the election. Since Hanson had been disendorsed, she entered Parliament as an independent.

== MP for Oxley (1996–1998) ==
Hanson gained extensive media coverage during her campaign and once she took her seat in the House. Her first speech attracted considerable attention for the views it expressed on benefits for Indigenous Australians, welfare, immigration and multiculturalism. During her term in Parliament, Hanson spoke on social and economic issues such as the need for a fairer child support scheme and concern for the emergence of the working-class poor. She also called for more accountable and effective administration of Indigenous affairs. Hanson's supporters viewed her as an ordinary person who challenged 'political correctness' as a threat to Australia's identity.

The reaction of the mainstream political parties was negative, with parliament passing a resolution (supported by all members except Graeme Campbell) condemning her views on immigration and multiculturalism. However, the prime minister at the time, John Howard, refused to censure Hanson or speak critically about her, acknowledging that her views were shared by many Australians, commenting that he saw the expression of such views as evidence that the "pall of political correctness" had been lifted in Australia, and that Australians could now "speak a little more freely and a little more openly about what they feel".

Hanson immediately labelled Howard a "strong leader" and said Australians were now free to discuss issues without "fear of being branded as a bigot or racist". Over the next few months, Hanson attracted populist anti-immigration sentiment and the attention of the Citizens' Electoral Council, the Australian League of Rights, and other right-wing groups. Then-Minister for Immigration Philip Ruddock announced a tougher government line on refugee applications, and cut the family reunion intake by 10,000, despite an election promise to maintain immigration levels. Various academic experts, business leaders and several state premiers attacked the justification offered by Ruddock, who had claimed that the reduction had been forced by continuing high unemployment. Various ethnic communities complained that this attack on multiculturalism was a cynical response to polls showing Hanson's rising popularity. Hanson claimed credit for forcing the government's hand.

=== Maiden speech ===
On 10 September 1996, Hanson gave her maiden speech to the House of Representatives, which was widely reported in the media. Opening her speech, Hanson said, "I won the seat of Oxley largely on an issue that has resulted in me being called a racist. That issue related to my comment that Aboriginals received more benefits than non-Aboriginals." Hanson then asserted that Australia was in danger of being "swamped by Asians", and that these immigrants "have their own culture and religion, form ghettos and do not assimilate". Hanson argued that "mainstream Australians" were instead subject to "a type of reverse racism ... by those who promote political correctness and those who control the various taxpayer funded 'industries' that flourish in our society servicing Aboriginals, multiculturalists and a host of other minority groups". This theme continued with the assertion that "present governments are encouraging separatism in Australia by providing opportunities, land, moneys and facilities available only to Aboriginals".

Among a series of criticisms of Aboriginal land rights, access to welfare and reconciliation, Hanson criticised the Aboriginal and Torres Strait Islander Commission (ATSIC), saying: "Anyone with a criminal record can, and does, hold a position with ATSIC". This was followed by a short series of statements on family breakdown, youth unemployment, international debt, the Family Law Act, child support, and the privatisation of Qantas and other national enterprises. The speech also included an attack on immigration and multiculturalism, a call for the return of high-tariff protectionism, and criticism of economic rationalism. Her speech was delivered uninterrupted by her fellow parliamentarians as it was the courtesy given to MPs delivering their maiden speeches.

=== Founding of One Nation ===
In February 1997, Hanson, David Oldfield and David Ettridge founded the Pauline Hanson's One Nation political party. Disenchanted rural voters attended her meetings in regional centres across Australia as she consolidated a support base for the new party. An opinion poll in May of that year indicated that the party was attracting the support of 9% of Australian voters and that its popularity was primarily at the expense of the Coalition's base.

Hanson's presence in the suburb of Dandenong, Victoria, to launch her party, was met with demonstrations on 7 July 1997, with 3,000–5,000 people rallying outside. A silent vigil and multicultural concert were organised by the Greater Dandenong City Council in response to Hanson's presence, while a demonstration was organised by an anti-racism body. The majority of attendees were of Asian origin, where an open platform attracted leaders of the Vietnamese, Chinese, East Timorese and Sri Lankan communities. Representatives from churches, local community groups, lesbian and gay and socialist organisations also attended and addressed the crowd.

In its late 1990s incarnation, One Nation called for zero net immigration, an end to multiculturalism and a "revival" of Australia's Anglo-Celtic cultural tradition which it said had been diminished, the abolition of native title and the Aboriginal and Torres Strait Islander Commission (ATSIC), an end to special Aboriginal funding programs, opposition to Aboriginal reconciliation which the party says will create two nations, and a review of the 1967 constitutional referendum which gave the Commonwealth power to legislate for Aborigines. The party's economic position was to support protectionism and trade retaliation, increased restrictions on foreign capital and the flow of capital overseas, and a general reversal of globalisation's influence on the Australian economy. Domestically, One Nation opposed privatisation, competition policy, and the GST, while proposing a government-subsidised people's bank to provide 2% loans to farmers, small businesses, and manufacturers. On foreign policy, One Nation called for a review of Australia's United Nations membership, a repudiation of Australia's UN treaties, an end to foreign aid, and a ban on foreigners from owning Australian land.

=== 1998 re-election campaign ===
1998 campaign poster

In 1999, The Australian reported that support for One Nation had fallen from 22% to 5%. One Nation Senate candidate Lenny Spencer blamed the press together with party director David Oldfield for the October 1998 election defeat, while the media reported the redirecting of preferences away from One Nation as the primary reason, with a lack of party unity, poor policy choices, and an "inability to work with the media" also responsible.

Ahead of the 1998 federal election, an electoral redistribution essentially split Oxley in half. Oxley was reconfigured as a marginal Labor seat, losing most of its more rural and exurban area while picking up the heavily pro-Labor suburb of Inala. A new seat of Blair was created in the rural area surrounding Ipswich. Hanson knew her chances of holding the reconfigured Oxley were slim, especially after former Labor state premier Wayne Goss won preselection for the seat. After considering whether to contest a Senate seat—which, by most accounts, she would have been heavily tipped to win—she opted to contest Blair. Despite its very large notional Liberal majority (18.7%), most of her base was now located there.

Hanson launched her 1998 election campaign with a focus on jobs, rather than a focus on race/ethnicity or on "the people" against "the elites". Instead, Hanson focused on unemployment and the need to create more jobs not through government schemes but by "cheap loans to business, by more apprenticeships, and by doing something about tariffs".

Hanson won 36% of the primary vote, slightly over 10% more than the second-place Labor candidate, Virginia Clarke. However, with all three major parties preferencing each other ahead of Hanson, Liberal candidate Cameron Thompson was able to win the seat despite finishing in third place on the first count. Thompson overtook Clarke on National preferences and defeated Hanson on Labor preferences. It has been suggested by Thompson that Hanson's litigation against parodist Pauline Pantsdown was a distraction from the election, which contributed to her loss.

Nationally, One Nation gained 8.99% of the Senate vote and 8.4% of the Representatives vote, but only one MP was elected – Len Harris as a Senator for Queensland. Heather Hill had been elected to this position, but the High Court of Australia ruled that, although she was an Australian citizen, she was ineligible for election to sit as a Senator because she had not renounced her British citizenship. The High Court found that, at least since 1986, Britain had counted as a 'foreign power' within the meaning of section 44(i) of the Constitution. Hanson alleged in her 2007 autobiography Pauline Hanson: Untamed & Unashamed that a number of other politicians had dual citizenship yet this did not prevent them from holding positions in Parliament. Many MPs and Senators were removed from office during the 2017–18 Australian parliamentary eligibility crisis.

In 1998, Tony Abbott established a trust fund called "Australians for Honest Politics Trust" to help bankroll civil court cases against the One Nation Party and Hanson herself. John Howard denied any knowledge of the existence of such a fund. Abbott was also accused of offering funds to One Nation dissident Terry Sharples to support his court battle against the party. However, Howard defended the honesty of Abbott in this matter. Abbott conceded that the political threat One Nation posed to the Howard Government was "a very big factor" in his decision to pursue the legal attack, but he also said he was acting "in Australia's national interest". Howard also defended Abbott's actions, saying, "It's the job of the Liberal Party to politically attack other parties – there's nothing wrong with that."

== Between terms (1998–2016) ==
=== 2001 election campaign ===
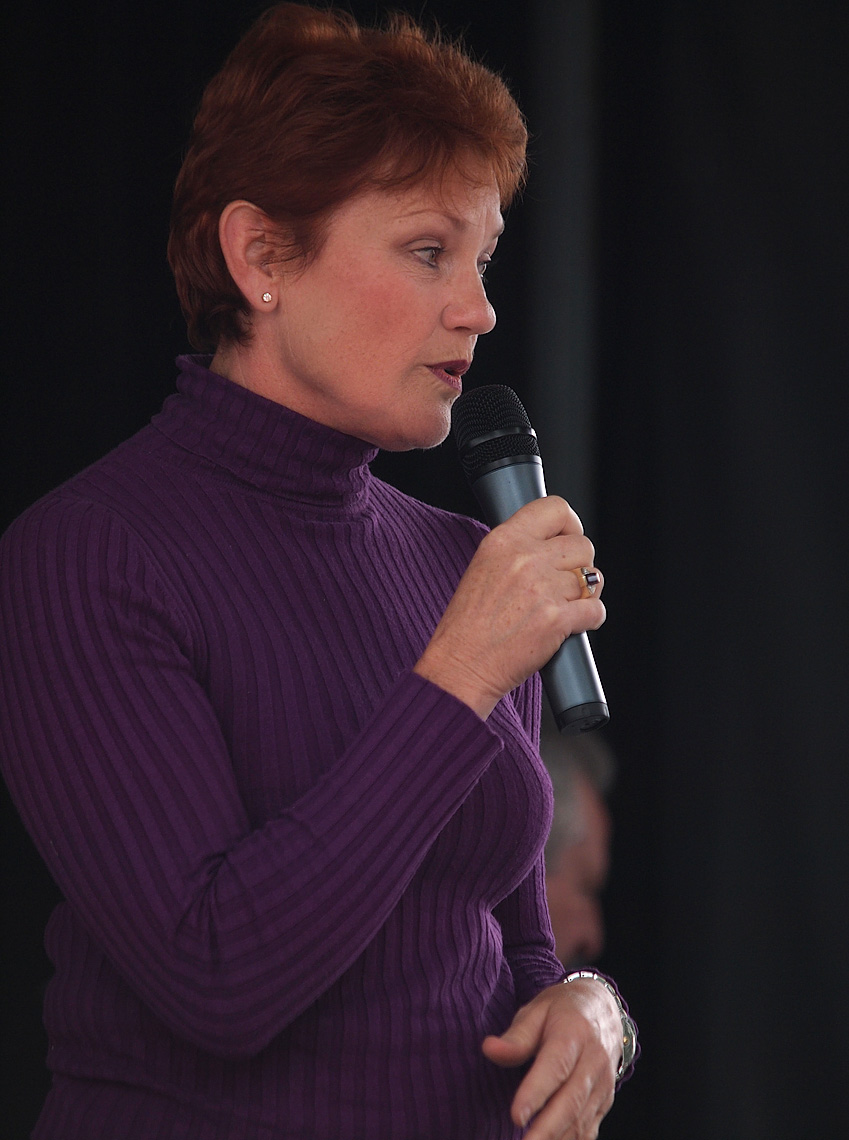
Hanson at the Kurri Kurri Nostalgia Festival in 2011

At the next federal election on 10 November 2001, Hanson ran for a Queensland Senate seat but narrowly failed. She accounted for her declining popularity by claiming that the Liberals under John Howard had stolen her policies.

It has been widely recognised by all, including the media, that John Howard sailed home on One Nation policies. In short, if we were not around, John Howard would not have made the decisions he did.

Other interrelated factors that contributed to her political decline from 1998 to 2002 include her connection with a series of advisors with whom she ultimately fell out (John Pasquarelli, David Ettridge and David Oldfield); disputes amongst her supporters; and a lawsuit over the organisational structure of One Nation.

In 2003, following her release from prison, Hanson unsuccessfully contested the New South Wales state election, running for a seat in the upper house. In January 2004, Hanson announced that she did not intend to return to politics, but then stood as an independent candidate for one of Queensland's seats in the Senate in the 2004 federal election. At the time, Hanson declared, "I don't want all the hangers-on. I don't want the advisers and everyone else. I want it to be this time, Pauline Hanson." She was unsuccessful, receiving only 31.77% of the required quota of primary votes, and did not pick up enough additional support through preferences. However, she attracted more votes than the One Nation party (4.54% compared to 3.14%) and, unlike her former party, recovered her deposit from the Australian Electoral Commission and secured $150,000 of public electoral funding. Hanson claimed to have been vilified over campaign funding.

Hanson contested the electoral district of Beaudesert as an independent at the 2009 Queensland state election. After an election campaign dominated by discussion over hoax photographs, she placed third behind the Liberal National Party's Aidan McLindon and Labor's Brett McCreadie. There were conflicting media reports as to whether she had said she would not consider running again.

On 23 July 2010, while at an event promoting her new career as a motivational speaker, Hanson expressed interest in returning to the political stage as a Liberal candidate if an invitation were to be offered by the leader Tony Abbott in the 2010 federal election. No such offer was made.

=== Rattnergate scandal ===
In March 2011, Hanson ran as an independent candidate for the New South Wales Legislative Council at the 2011 state election, but was not elected, receiving 2.41% of the primary statewide vote but losing on preferences. Following the election, Hanson alleged that "dodgy staff" employed by the NSW Electoral Commission put 1,200 votes for her in a pile of blank ballots, and she claimed that she had a forwarded NSW Electoral Commission internal email as evidence of this. Hanson then commenced legal proceedings to challenge the outcome of the election in the NSW Supreme Court, which sat as the Court of Disputed Returns.

From the start of proceedings, the NSW Electoral Commissioner maintained the view that Hanson's claims lacked substance. The man who alerted Hanson to the alleged emails, who identified himself as "Michael Rattner", failed to appear in court on 8 June 2011. "Rattner" was revealed to be Shaun Castle, a history teacher who posed as a journalist to obtain embargoed progressive poll results.

"Michael Rattner" was a pun on Mickey Mouse, and reports linked the pseudonym to an "anti-voter-fraud" organisation led by Amy McGrath and Alasdair Webster.

After having refused to answer questions on the grounds of self-incrimination, Castle apologised to the court and was granted protection from prosecution by Justice McClellan, before being compelled to answer questions relating to the fraudulent email. The judge ordered that Hanson's legal costs of more than $150,000 be paid by the State of New South Wales – a move which outraged Greens MP Jeremy Buckingham, who would have been replaced by Hanson had her challenge been successful. Questioning whether Hanson's legal action should have gone ahead at all given the nature of the evidence, Buckingham said, "This lack of judgement shows that she's unfit for public office." Earlier, the judge, Justice McClellan, said Hanson had no other remedy but to take legal action after receiving the fraudulent email.

=== Expulsion and return to One Nation ===
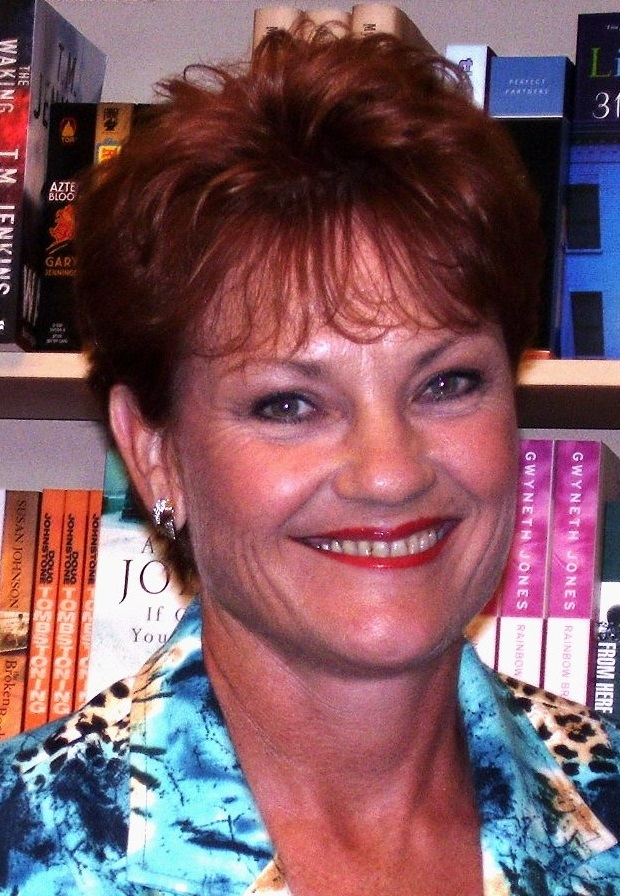
Hanson in March 2007 at the launch of her autobiography Untamed and Unashamed

At the 1999 state election, One Nation co-founder David Oldfield was elected to the New South Wales Legislative Council, the state parliament's upper house. However, in 2000, Oldfield was expelled from One Nation for an alleged verbal dispute with Hanson. Within weeks, Oldfield had established the splinter group, One Nation NSW.

One Nation won three seats in the Western Australian Legislative Council at the 2001 state election, but the electoral success of One Nation began to deteriorate after this point because the split-away of One Nation NSW began to spark further lack of party unity, and a series of gaffes by One Nation members and candidates, particularly in Queensland.

Hanson resigned from One Nation in January 2002, and John Fischer, the state leader from Western Australia, was elected the federal president of One Nation.

On 24 May 2007, Hanson launched Pauline's United Australia Party (PUAP). The party name invokes that of the historic United Australia Party. Speaking on her return to politics, she stated, "I have had all the major political parties attack me, been kicked out of my own party and ended up in prison, but I don't give up." In October 2007, Hanson launched her campaign song, entitled "Australian Way of Life", which included the line, "Welcome everyone, no matter where you come from." The election campaign received media attention due to Hanson hiring a convicted child predator, Bob Hutton, as a volunteer for PUAP. Hutton had been charged with raping two children in 2003, and remained on the national child offender registry until 2018, though he claimed innocence. Hanson defended Hutton, stating "[i]f I thought Bob was guilty of that I wouldn't have him around me." Under the PUAP banner, Hanson again contested one of Queensland's seats in the Senate in the 2007 federal election, when she received over 4% of total votes.

After an unsuccessful campaign in the 2009 Queensland state election, Hanson announced in 2010 that she planned to deregister Pauline's United Australia Party, sell her Queensland house and move to the United Kingdom. The announcement was warmly welcomed by Nick Griffin, leader of the far-right British National Party (BNP). While considering the move, Hanson said that she would not sell her house to Muslims. However, following an extended holiday in Europe, Hanson said in November 2010 that she had decided not to move to Britain because it was "overrun with immigrants and refugees". Hanson lives in Beaudesert, Queensland.

In 2013, Hanson announced that she would stand in the 2013 federal election. She rejoined the One Nation party and was a Senate candidate in New South Wales. She did not win a seat, attracting 1.22% of the first preference vote.

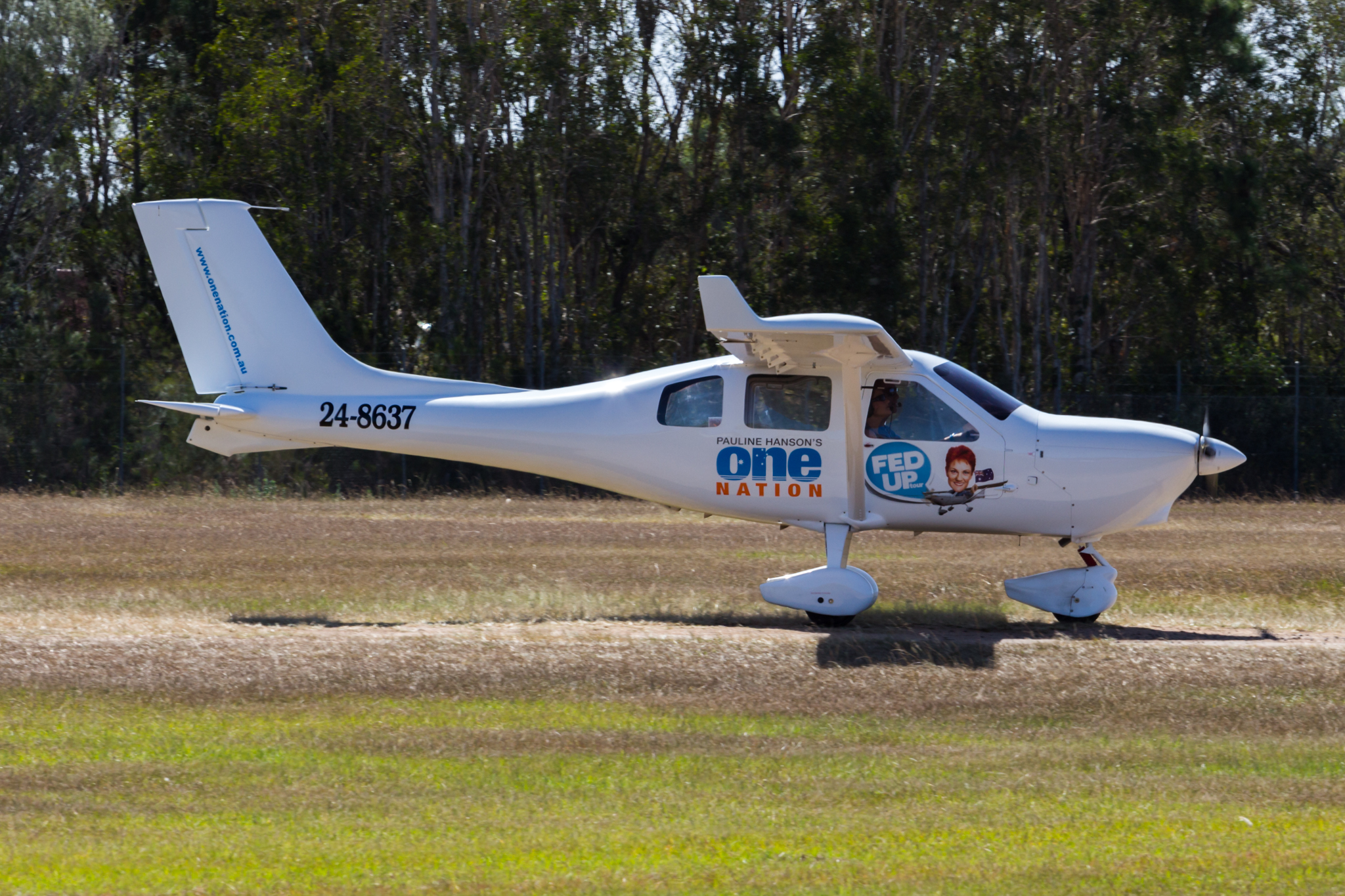
Pauline Hanson in a Jabiru J230 at Caboolture Airfield for the Caboolture Air Show in April 2016. The aircraft has "Fed Up" slogan decals on the side.

In November 2014, Hanson announced that she had returned as One Nation leader, prior to the party's announcement, following support from One Nation party members. She announced that she would contest the seat of Lockyer in the 2015 Queensland state election. One Nation held the Queensland seat of Lockyer from 1998 to 2004. In February 2015, Hanson lost the seat by a narrow margin.

== Senator for Queensland (2016–present) ==
=== First term (2016–2022) ===
In mid-2015, Hanson announced that she would contest the Senate for Queensland at the 2016 federal election, and also announced the endorsement of several other candidates throughout Australia. She campaigned on a tour she called "Fed Up" in 2015 and spoke at a Reclaim Australia rally. Hanson won a seat in the Senate at the election, and One Nation won 9% of the vote in Queensland. According to the rules governing the allocation of Senate seats following a double dissolution, Hanson served a full six-year term. Hanson secured a spot on the National Broadband Network parliamentary committee.

After being elected to the parliament, she and other One Nation senators voted with the governing Coalition on a number of welfare cuts, and usually supported the government.

On 17 August 2017, Hanson received criticism after wearing a burqa, which she claims "oppresses women", into the Senate. Attorney-General George Brandis got a standing ovation from Labor and Greens senators after he gave an "emotional" speech, telling Hanson, "To ridicule that community, to drive it into a corner, to mock its religious garments is an appalling thing to do." Following the incident, polling found that 57% of Australians supported Hanson's call to ban the burka in public places, with 44% "strongly" supporting a ban. In August 2017, the party's constitution was changed, for Hanson to become party President for as long as she may wish and to choose her successor, who may also continue until resignation.

On 22 March 2018, Hanson announced that One Nation would back the Turnbull government's corporate tax cuts. She subsequently reversed her position, citing the failure of the government to cut immigration levels and support coal-fired power.

On 15 October 2018, Hanson proposed an "It's OK to be white" motion in the Australian Senate intended to acknowledge the "deplorable rise of anti-white racism and attacks on Western civilisation". It was supported by most senators from the governing Liberal–National Coalition, but was defeated 31–28 by opponents who called it a racist slogan from the white supremacist movement. The following day, the motion was "recommittal", and this time rejected unanimously by senators in attendance, with its initial supporters in the Liberal–National Coalition saying they had voted for it due to an administrative error (One Nation did not attend the recommittal vote).

On 18 September 2019, the Liberal government announced that Hanson would co-chair the newly announced parliamentary inquiry into family law along with Kevin Andrews. She proposed a parliament motion advocating opposition to the proposed Great Reset of the World Economic Forum, on the belief that it is cover for creating a New World Order. Her proposal was defeated by 37 votes to 2.

In 2019, Hanson campaigned against a ban on climbing Uluru, a sacred site for local Aboriginal people. Shortly before the ban came into effect in August, the Nine Network paid for Hanson's trip to Uluru, and on their A Current Affair program she was shown in a controversial episode climbing the rock.

Beginning in May 2019, Hanson was a regular contributor on the Nine Network's Today. She was removed from the role in July 2020 after describing people who lived in Melbourne public housing as drug addicts who couldn't speak English.

Following the 2019 federal election, One Nation obtained $2.8 million in electoral expenses from the Australian Electoral Commission. Later, the Commission required One Nation to repay $165,442 as money that had not been spent or not spent for electoral purposes. In addition, it is reported: "Hanson has personally agreed to an enforceable undertaking. And the party must in future make sure all invoices are in Hanson's name, the party's name or the name of a party officer. And make sure that all invoices match payment receipts, credit card or bank statements."

In June 2021, following media reports that the proposed national curriculum was "preoccupied with the oppression, discrimination and struggles of Indigenous Australians", the Senate approved a motion tabled by Hanson calling on the federal government to reject critical race theory, despite it not being included in the curriculum.

=== Second term (2022–present) ===
In July 2022, the Senate opened with the Lord's Prayer and an Acknowledgement of Country, as normal. The ceremony includes the words: "[the Parliament] recognises the Ngunnawal and Ngambri peoples as the traditional custodians of the Canberra meetings, and pays respects to elders past, present and emerging." Despite having sat through the ceremony many times before, this time Hanson stormed out of the chamber, yelling "No I don't, and I never will!"

Hanson later stated that her opposition was to a motion that the Aboriginal flag and Torres Strait Islander flag, which are both official flags of Australia, should be raised inside the Senate chamber alongside the Australian flag.

On 24 March 2023, Hanson and fellow One Nation senator Malcolm Roberts attended the "Let Women Speak" rally held by anti-transgender activist Kellie-Jay Keen-Minshull and both were also photographed alongside Keen-Minshull. On 30 March, Hanson criticised One Nation New South Wales leader Mark Latham's homophobic tweet in response to openly gay fellow politician Alex Greenwich and called for him to apologise.

Hanson actively supported the "No" campaign for the 2023 Australian Indigenous Voice referendum, and was frequently accused of stoking racial divisions. She compared the proposed Voice to apartheid, asserting it would give "a minority of people more political power than the majority based on race". In August 2023, Hanson reshared a video on Facebook from 2021 that had been deceptively edited and clipped to depict an argument between a white woman and Indigenous woman. Hanson asserted that the video clip, which only resurfaced as the debate over the Voice had begun, was an example of racial division that would occur if the Voice referendum succeeded. After being approached by ABC Investigations regarding the video, Hanson quietly removed it from her Facebook page.

Hanson speaking at a far-right rally in November 2025

In September 2024, Hanson proposed an amendment to the Sex Discrimination Act 1984 to remove mentions of gender identity. Hanson described the bill as supporting "biological reality over contrived gender identities". The bill failed to pass the Senate.

In November 2024, Hanson accused Independent Senator Fatima Payman of being a dual citizen of Australia and Afghanistan, in violation of section 44 of the Constitution of Australia. Payman, who was born in Afghanistan, formally renounced her Afghan citizenship in October 2021 before entering parliament; Hanson alleged that Payman had not provided enough evidence of her lack of dual-citizenship. A senate motion put forward by Hanson to investigate the status of Payman's citizenship was defeated 35 votes to 3, with Hanson, Malcolm Roberts, and Ralph Babet being the only Senators to vote in favour. Payman called Hanson racist, and a "disgrace to the human race", but later withdrew those comments.

On 24 November 2025, Hanson wore a burqa on the Senate floor in a scene similar to a stunt performed in 2017. This was after a bill to ban the burqa failed. The entire Senate chamber was suspended for 90 minutes as a result of Hanson's action. She was formally censured by the Senate the next day and was suspended for seven sitting days.

On 17 June 2026, Hanson made her first formal address at the National Press Club since entering politics in 1996. Her appearance followed a recent surge in support for the One Nation party. In the speech, Hanson attacked multiculturalism, transgender people, industrial relations, and the ABC and SBS. Hanson's address was compared to the far-right movement in the United States and United Kingdom.

Hanson appointed Chris Taylor, former policy adviser to prime minister Scott Morrison as her chief of staff in August 2026, replacing James Ashby. Ashby moved to a new role as party director for One Nation.

In September 2026, Hanson made an alliance with Australia's Voice Senator Fatima Payman and Independent MP Dai Le to request changes to how the Parliament allocates staff to parties. The three claimed that the system favours major parties.

On 4 October 2026, Hanson supported comments from One Nation Victoria candidate and filmmaker Mark Nicholson, stating that former premiers Daniel Andrews and Jacinta Allan should be put in prison by Christmas.

== Electoral history ==
Queensland Legislative Assembly
Election year	Electorate	Party	Votes	FP%	+/-	2PP%	+/-	Result
2009	Beaudesert	Independent	5,998	21.20	▲21.20	N/A	N/A	Third
2015	Lockyer	One Nation	8,132	26.74	▲26.74	49.78	▲49.78	Second

New South Wales Legislative Council
Election year	Electorate	Party	Votes	FP%	+/-	Quota	+/-	Result
2003	Legislative Council	Hanson Group	71,368	1.92	▲1.92	0.42	▲0.42	Eliminated
2011	Legislative Council	Independent	98,043	2.41	▲2.41	0.53	▲0.53	Eliminated

House of Representatives
Election year	Electorate	Party	Votes	FP%	+/-	2PP%	+/-	Result
1996	Oxley	Liberal	33,960	48.61	▲22.86	54.66	▲19.31	First
1998	Blair	One Nation	24,516	35.97	▲35.97	46.60	▲46.60	Second

Senate
Election year	Electorate	Party	Votes	FP%	+/-	Quota	+/-	Result
2001	Queensland	One Nation	215,400	10.02	▼4.80	0.70	▼0.33	Eliminated
2004	Queensland	Independent	102,824	4.54	▲4.54	0.32	▲0.32	Eliminated
2007	Queensland	Pauline's UAP	101,461	4.19	▲4.19	0.29	▲0.29	Eliminated
2016	Queensland	One Nation	250,126	9.19	▲8.64	1.19	▲1.15	Elected
2022	Queensland	One Nation	222,925	7.40	▼2.87	0.52	▼0.20	Elected

== Political views and controversies ==
Hanson has been characterised variously as radical right, far-right and right-wing populist. Hanson has repeatedly denied charges of racism.

In 1998, social commentator Keith Suter argued that Hanson's views were better understood as an angry response to globalisation.

=== Race, immigration and multiculturalism ===
In her maiden speech, Hanson proposed a drastic reduction in immigration, with particular reference to immigrants from Asia. Condemning multiculturalism, One Nation has railed against government immigration and multicultural policies.

While Hanson stated in 2018 that she does not support reinstating the White Australia policy, in 2026 on a podcast with far-right activist Tommy Robinson, she said she laments the end of the White Australia policy.

After Hanson was elected to Parliament in 1996, journalist Tracey Curro asked her on 60 Minutes whether she was xenophobic. Hanson replied, "Please explain?" This response became a much-parodied catchphrase within Australian culture, and was included in the title of the 2016 SBS documentary film Pauline Hanson: Please Explain!

In 2006, Hanson stated that African immigrants were bringing diseases into Australia and were of "no benefit to this country whatsoever". She also expressed her opposition to Muslim immigration. Ten years after her maiden speech, its effects were still being discussed within a racism framework, and were included in resources funded by the Queensland Government on "Combating racism in Queensland". In 2007, Hanson publicly backed Kevin Andrews, then Minister for Immigration under John Howard, in his views about African migrants and crime.

In 2022, Hanson claimed that Australian tourists returning from Bali had brought disease, saying that they brought manure back to Australia, leading to Murray Watt deploring Hanson's rant as shameful. Hanson's statement later attracted more anger from Sandiaga Uno, who condemned her statement as an insult to Bali and ridiculed her for calling Bali a sovereign nation while telling her to "check Google first". Governor I Wayan Koster also denounced Hanson's claims as lies.

In 2018, Hanson called for immigration numbers to be capped at 75,000 a year. In 2025, Hanson called for immigration to be cut to 130,000 a year.

In a June 2026 speech to the National Press Club, Hanson stated that Australia "cannot be a multicultural society" and "must" become monocultural, arguing that immigration had diluted the singular Australian identity. Hanson has stated that Australia is a multiracial society.

=== Indigenous Australians ===
On her election in 1996, Hanson was a critic of the Aboriginal and Torres Strait Islander Commission (ATSIC) and has long criticised recognition of Aboriginal land and programs that assist Indigenous Australians.

In 2020, Hanson did not oppose the Scott Morrison 2020 change to Australia's national anthem, from "For we are young and free" to "For we are one and free".

In April 2023, at an anti-Voice event, Hanson falsely claimed that an increase in the First Nations population was attributed to people falsely claiming Aboriginal ancestry. She announced that she was drafting a private member's bill that would change the definition of "Aboriginality" in response to the increase of First Nations-identified people. Hanson also called herself a friend of "the true blacks – from up Darwin, up Cairns", which caused an "outcry" from Indigenous people at the event.

In September 2026, comments Hanson made in a podcast the previous year resurfaced, where she called Indigenous Australians "the world's most primitive race" and claimed "they've achieved nothing." Her comments attracted criticism from across the media and political spectrum, with Liberal Party Senator Jacinta Nampijinpa Price saying the comments had entered "appalling territory" and saying that "all decent Australians" should condemn Hanson's comments. In response, Hanson stated that she did not mean to cause offence, but refused to retract the remarks.

=== Islam ===
Hanson has made various remarks which have been described as reflecting anti-Muslim or Islamophobic rhetoric. While she has attempted to appeal to politically conservative Christians in her speeches and political rhetoric, she has drawn criticism from many Christians, such as the Anglican Archbishop of Sydney, Kanishka Raffel, over her rhetoric on Muslims.

I've got no time for radical Islam. Their religion concerns me because of what it says in the Koran. They hate Westerners. That's what it's all about. You say, 'Well, there's good Muslims out there.' How can you tell me there are good Muslims?

— Pauline Hanson, 16 February 2026

In February 2026, Hanson was widely criticised for remarks in a Sky News interview where she suggested that there are no "good" Muslims. Hanson later apologised for the comment, while also stating "I am not backing down."

==== Proposed Muslim immigration ban ====
After the 2016 Pulse nightclub shooting, Hanson called for a ban on Muslim immigration to Australia. The same year, Hanson announced several policies, including a ban on building new mosques until a royal commission into whether Islam is a religion or a political ideology has been held, and installing CCTV cameras in all existing mosques. She has called for a moratorium on accepting Muslim immigrants into Australia.

In her 2016 maiden speech in the Senate, she said that "We are in danger of being swamped by Muslims who bear a culture and ideology that is incompatible with our own" and that they should "go back to where [they] came from", and called for banning Muslim migration. The speech prompted a walkout by Senate members of the Australian Greens.

After the January 2017 Melbourne car attack, Hanson repeated her stance on banning Muslims from entering Australia. In a live interview after the attack, she stated, "All terrorist attacks in this country have been by Muslims", on which she was corrected by a journalist. In response, the Islamic Council of Victoria asked for a public apology for Hanson's statement.

On 24 March 2017, after the 2017 Westminster attack, Hanson made an announcement in a video posted to social media, holding up a piece of paper with her own proposed hash tag "#Pray4MuslimBan". "That is how you solve the problem, put a ban on it and then let's deal with the issues here", she said.

By 2026, Hanson's position had shifted from a total Muslim immigration ban to just banning immigrants from a number of Muslim nations.

==== Halal ====
In 2015, Hanson wrongly claimed that halal certification in Australia was funding terrorism.

On 22 June 2017, Hanson moved a motion in the Senate calling on the government to respond to the halal inquiry. The motion was passed.

==== Burqa ====
On 17 August 2017, Hanson wore a burqa onto the floor of the Australian Senate in a move to rally support for a national ban of the religious attire, citing "national security" concerns. The move quickly became widely condemned by Labor, the Greens, and the Liberal Party. In response, the Attorney-General George Brandis, who is tasked with giving advice on national security legislation, gave an "emotional" speech calling Hanson's stunt "an appalling thing to do" and advised Hanson "to be very very careful of the offense you may do to the religious sensibilities of other Australians", to which both Labor and Greens Senators gave a standing ovation.

=== Climate change ===
Hanson rejects scientific consensus on climate change and wants Australia to halt its climate mitigation strategies, build more coal-fired power plants and embrace nuclear power. One Nation's policies include abolishing the federal Department of Climate Change, which provides advice to government on these matters, and banning battery energy storage.

In her address to the National Press Club on 17 June 2026, Hanson called climate change a "hoax", called for a ban on wind farm energy, incorrectly claimed the Clean Energy Finance Corporation had received $200 billion of taxpayers' funding and claimed that One Nation's policy for nuclear energy would be at the "world's cheapest price", a claim contrary to modelling by the CSIRO on the cost of comparative energy production.

=== Abortion ===
On her original election to Parliament in 1996, Hanson was pro-choice, however since 2022, Hanson and One Nation policy is to restrict access to abortion services for women and “seek every opportunity to roll back brutal and extreme abortion law". She has appeared on podcasts with anti-abortion activist Joanna Howe.

Hanson has said that 20 weeks was too late for an abortion and has been criticised for "recycling the same misinformation about late-term abortion that has been used by the pro-life movement in the US".

=== Gun control ===
Hanson opposed the government's proposed measures to restrict access to certain high-powered firearms, following the 2025 Bondi Beach shooting.

A 2019 report found that One Nation had received over $6,000 in disclosed donations from pro-gun groups during the 2011–2018 period, with concerns that these donations threatened to compromise Australia's safety by undermining gun control laws. In 2019, an Al Jazeera investigation showed One Nation officials James Ashby and Steve Dickson secretly discussing potential donations from the National Rifle Association and efforts to weaken Australia's gun laws.

=== COVID-19 ===
Hanson has been accused of using Facebook to exploit the COVID-19 crisis. She has been accused of having "sought to exploit the COVID-19 crisis by manufacturing anti-Chinese sentiment in Australia with the purpose of legitimising her party's long-standing policies on issues like immigration", such as by "almost exclusively referring to COVID-19 as the 'Chinese virus'". She is also said to have "used the crisis to call for Australia to withdraw from its free trade agreement with China, has urged Australians to boycott products made in China, called for the immediate suspension of all Chinese foreign investment into Australia and suggested that backpackers and foreign workers should be denied welfare assistance and called for Australia to cease all foreign aid". She accused the United Nations and World Health Organisation of acting as a "propaganda arm of the Chinese Government". Hanson has also been accused of having "floated the unfounded conspiracy theory that COVID-19 was developed in a Chinese laboratory and has suggested that China has 'unleashed' Coronavirus on the world". This occurred during a time of increased racist attacks against Chinese and Asian people living in Australia.

Hanson's policies include defunding the Therapeutic Goods Administration, the government authority responsible for evaluating medicines and medical devices.

=== Domestic violence ===
I'm saying to those women out there: don't throw domestic violence orders against your ex-partners just to further your case or get control of the children. That's not fair or right. There are people out there who are nothing but liars, and will use that in the court system. You can't defend these people and I will not defend them.

— Pauline Hanson, September 2019

Hanson has received criticism over her comments on domestic violence victims. In 2019, Hanson was selected by then-Prime Minister Scott Morrison to co-chair a parliamentary inquiry into family law. The same year, Hanson asserted without evidence that many victims who report domestic violence are lying to take advantage of family court. Hanson went on to claim that her son, who pled guilty to breaching a domestic violence order in 2016, was falsely accused.

In July 2026, anti–domestic violence campaigners criticised Hanson after she described domestic violence as a "two-way street" and suggested abused women should simply leave their relationships. Hanson's comments occurred shortly after her interview with far-right activist Tommy Robinson, who has had criminal convictions, including for assault.

It was soon after revealed that in late 2025, Hanson, in a podcast appearance, labelled paid family and domestic violence leave a “holiday” and a “scam” and said that police spend too much time addressing domestic violence instead of focussing on "real crime".

=== Workplace rights ===
Hanson has generally voted against increasing workplace rights and has attracted campaigns against her by unions and worker advocates.

Hanson has said that businesses tell her that their employees are "lazy" and too difficult to sack. She has consistently opposed increases to the minimum wage.

=== Children with disabilities ===
In 2017, Hanson suggested that children with disabilities, including autism, should be removed from mainstream classrooms and educated in separate special-needs classrooms, claiming they put strain on teachers and reduce learning time for other students. The statement was condemned by disability advocates and politicians.

=== LGBTQ rights ===
Hanson is largely opposed to LGBTQ rights, with a particular hostility towards transgender and intersex issues. According to They Vote For You, Hanson has "generally" voted against strengthening legal protections for LGBTQ people, and "almost always" voted against protections for transgender people. However, she has criticised One Nation members who have made homophobic comments, such as Mark Latham.

==== Sexuality ====
In 1996, when asked by Tracey Curro what she thought of the Sydney Gay and Lesbian Mardi Gras, Hanson infamously replied "I don't like it". This response inspired the parodical song, "I Don't Like It", released in August 1998 by satirist Pauline Pantsdown, to mock Hanson's views. In 2026, Hanson reiterated her stance on Mardi Gras and said that sexuality should be "kept ... behind closed doors".

In 2013, Hanson was opposed to same-sex marriage and same-sex adoption. In 2017, She stated that she would ignore a majority "yes" result in the Australian Marriage Law Postal Survey on the issue and subsequently abstained from voting on it in the Senate.

By 2026, Hanson said she had no problem with same-sex marriage.

==== Gender ====
Hanson is against transgender rights. In her June 2026 National Press Club address, Hanson referred to a so-called "transgender insurgency": she accused transgender people of "infecting all of society", likened trans awareness to radical Islam, and argued that "every instrument" of the federal government was "dedicated to a transgender ideology which seeks to redefine humanity". In July, while at the Conservative Political Action Conference in London, Hanson claimed that Australia is "too stupid" regarding transgender issues, and "can't determine who is a male and female".

In 2019, Hanson voted against a parliamentary motion to recognise intersex people.

=== Democracy ===
Hanson opposes lowering the voting age to 16 and supports raising the voting age from 18 to 21, with her justification being that "many teenagers are too confused, underprepared, and heavily influenced by ideological agendas in the education system".

=== Foreign affairs ===
==== Donald Trump and Iran conflict ====
Hanson often praises US President Donald Trump; when asked by a journalist in June 2026 whether he had made any mistakes as president, she responded, "No."

Hanson called for Australia to help Trump by entering the 2026 Iran war.

==== Israel–Palestine conflict ====
Hanson is a supporter of Israel, and believes Australia should be fully aligned with Israel. She has called pro-Palestinian protests in Australia "disgusting" and "un-Australian".

On 15 May 2024, coinciding with Nakba Day, Hanson wore a scarf featuring the Israeli flag to parliament while the Senate was discussing a motion to acknowledge the Nakba. Hanson was ordered to remove the scarf before responding to the motion. Hanson later stated regarding the scarf incident that she was "wearing my heart on my sleeve when it comes to this issue", and denied that there is a genocide in Gaza.

==== Vladimir Putin ====
In March 2017, Hanson expressed her admiration towards Russian President Vladimir Putin, saying he is a "strong man", claimed Australians support his leadership, and cited an unspecific opinion poll that "97 per cent of people in his country respect him as a leader for their nation" in addition to questioning his direct involvement in the shooting down of Malaysia Airlines Flight 17. However in July 2026, Hanson condemned Putin for his invasion of Ukraine.

=== Media ===
Hanson has said that a One Nation government would cut the ABC back to a regional-focused service only, removing public funding for metropolitan operations and turning it into a "subscription service" in capital cities. She also called for the abolishment of the Special Broadcasting Service (SBS), arguing the taxpayer-funded service was no longer necessary due to the Internet.

Hanson has repeatedly attacked ABC News due to coverage of the party that she deemed to be "unobjective" and making the party appear "illegitimate"; she took particular issue with a March 2026 ABC report about a One Nation candidate who had been charged with sexual misconduct in the UK, and had an arrest warrant for missing a court date. One Nation began to refuse interviews with the ABC's reporters, and ban the broadcaster from attending its campaign events.

Similarly, Hanson has also banned The Guardian after she was questioned by the outlet at her 2026 Press Club speech. Hanson was questioned about her daughter, Lee Hanson, being paid more than $150,000 per year as a political adviser to a One Nation New South Wales senator, whilst seemingly campaigning full-time in Tasmania.

In a 2026 interview with British far-right activist Tommy Robinson, Hanson praised Sky News Australia, which she said gives One Nation "a good run".

=== Public housing ===
Hanson was widely criticised in September 2026 for ridiculing Anthony Albanese's mother, who lived most of her life in public housing. Hanson said it was "not on" that Albanese's mother lived in public housing for so long, while receiving a disability pension because of chronic arthritis and called Albanese "pathetic" for referring to his childhood in public housing in public discussion. Hanson was criticised by nearly all corners of Australian politics, with Liberal Party MP Andrew Hastie describing Hanson's comments as another example of how she is unfit for office. A few days later, Hanson offered a "qualified apology" and denied that her comments were derogatory towards Albanese's mother, claiming that she was referring to the housing commission of the time.

== Donations and patronage ==
One Nation has received several large donations from billionaire mining magnate Gina Rinehart, including to fund flights on Rinehart's luxury jet for events and to dine at Mar-a-Lago, the luxury resort of Donald Trump in Florida, U.S.

In 2026, it was revealed by The Guardian that Hanson and Barnaby Joyce billed taxpayers more than $3,000 to attend fundraising and donor events on board the luxury cruise ship MS The World, hosted by Rinehart.

In September 2026, Australia's neo-Nazi movement declared it would campaign for Hanson to become Prime Minister. The announcement came shortly after it was revealed that her party had met with Restore Britain party leader Rupert Lowe, whose party has links to banned neo-Nazi groups. Thomas Sewell of the neo-Nazi National Socialist Network (NSN) declared he would support Hanson's bid to become prime minister of Australia, and linked the NSN's ongoing High Court legal challenge to Hanson's ability to win the next election. Hanson's office did not disavow Sewell's remarks.

== Legal issues ==
=== Fraud conviction and reversal ===
A 1999 civil suit reached the Queensland Court of Appeal in 2000 involving disgruntled former One Nation member Terry Sharples and led to a finding of fraud when registering One Nation as a political party.

On 20 August 2003, a jury in the District Court of Queensland convicted Hanson and David Ettridge of electoral fraud. Both Hanson and Ettridge were sentenced to three years imprisonment for falsely claiming that 500 members of the Pauline Hanson Support Movement were members of the political organisation Pauline Hanson's One Nation to register that organisation in Queensland as a political party and apply for electoral funding. Because the registration was found to be unlawful, Hanson's receipt of electoral funding worth $498,637 resulted in two further convictions for dishonestly obtaining property, each with three-year sentences, to run concurrently with the first. The sentence was widely criticised in the media, and by some politicians, including the prime minister, John Howard, and Liberal politician Bronwyn Bishop, as being too harsh.

On 6 November 2003, delivering judgment the day after hearing the appeal, the Queensland Court of Appeal quashed all of Hanson and Ettridge's convictions. Hanson, having spent 11 weeks in jail, was immediately released along with Ettridge. The court's unanimous decision was that the evidence did not support a conclusion beyond reasonable doubt that the people on the list were not members of the Pauline Hanson's One Nation party and that Hanson and Ettridge knew this when the application to register the party was submitted. Accordingly, the convictions regarding registration were quashed. The convictions regarding funding, which depended on the same facts, were also quashed.

=== Sexual harassment allegations ===
On 14 February 2019, Hanson was accused of sexually harassing fellow senator Brian Burston. Burston claimed that Hanson "rubbed her fingers up my spine" in an incident that occurred in 1998, and propositioned him after he was elected in 2016. In court, it was revealed that Hanson also sent a "malicious" text message to Burston's wife claiming he was infatuated with another staff member. Hanson denied the claims of sexual harassment.

=== Racial vilification ===
Avatar of Pauline Hanson

Pauline Hanson
(@PaulineHansonOz)
tweeted:

Your attitude appalls and disgusts me. When you immigrated to Australia you took every advantage of this country. You took citizenship, bought multiple homes, and a job in a parliament. It's clear you're not happy, so pack your bags and piss off back to Pakistan. -PH

9 September 2022

In September 2022, Hanson tweeted that Greens senator Mehreen Faruqi should "piss off back to Pakistan". This came after Faruqi was heavily criticised over what she called an "appalling" tweet about Queen Elizabeth II after her death. Subsequently, Faruqi decided to launch court proceedings against Hanson for "breaching section 18C of the Racial Discrimination Act 1975". On 1 November 2024, it was reported that Federal Court of Australia judge Angus Stewart had ruled that Hanson's tweet was an "angry personal attack", unconnected with the issues Faruqi raised, and was therefore "anti-Muslim or Islamophobic". Hanson was ordered to delete the tweet and Faruqi was awarded costs for the entire proceedings. Hanson said that she would appeal the decision.

As of November 2025, along with Sue Chrysanthou, Hanson is appealing the judgement. On 27 July 2026, the Federal Court rejected Hanson's appeal. Hanson indicated that she might appeal the verdict to the High Court. On 22 August, Hanson announced she would appeal to the High Court, and would argue that section 18C was unconstitutional.

== Personal life ==
According to Guardian Australia, Hanson is an atheist. She has refused to discuss her personal views regarding religion.

Hanson has "Irish-Catholic and Anglo-Protestant roots". In 2007, a DNA swab test revealed Hanson is also of Northern European, Italian, Greek, Turkish, and Middle Eastern ancestry. She commented that she was "amazed" and "mystified" by the revelation.

=== Relationships and children ===
When she was 16, Hanson married Walter Zagorski, who was 24. They had two sons, separated in 1976 and later divorced.

In 1980, Hanson (then Pauline Zagorski) married Mark Hanson, a divorced tradesman working on the Gold Coast, Queensland. They honeymooned in Southeast Asia. Mark Hanson had a daughter from his previous marriage, and he later had two children with Hanson: Adam and Lee. Together they established a trades and construction business, in which Hanson was in charge of the administrative and bookkeeping work and would on occasion assist her husband on more practical work. Hanson has written about her difficult marriage, in which alcohol and domestic violence impacted her family. They divorced in 1987. Lee was a candidate for One Nation in the 2025 Australian federal election.

In 1988, Hanson began a relationship with Morrie Marsden, a businessman in Queensland. Together, they established a catering service under the holding company Marsden Hanson Pty Ltd, and operated from their fish and chips store, Marsden's Seafood, in Silkstone, Queensland. Marsden worked on Hanson's campaign for political office in the seat of Oxley in 1996 and was a member of her staff after her election. When Hanson began to receive national and international media attention for her views, Marsden left the relationship. Hanson had begun a relationship with Ipswich man Rick Gluyas in 1994. Gluyas encouraged her to run as a candidate in the 1994 Ipswich City Council election, in which he also ran. Both were elected. Hanson and Gluyas ended their relationship sometime after this, with Hanson retaining the home and property they had owned jointly at Coleyville, near Ipswich.

In 1996, Hanson began a relationship with David Oldfield. In 2000, all of Hanson's relations with Oldfield ended when he was dismissed from Pauline Hanson's One Nation.

In 2005, Hanson began a relationship with Chris Callaghan, a country music singer and political activist. He wrote and composed the song "The Australian Way of Life", which was used in Hanson's 2007 campaign for the Australian Senate, under her new United Australia Party. In 2007, Hanson revealed that she and Callaghan were engaged. However, in 2008, Hanson broke off the relationship.

In 2011, while campaigning for the New South Wales Legislative Council, Hanson began a relationship with property developer and real estate agent Tony Nyquist.

=== Television appearances ===
In 2004, Hanson appeared in multiple television programs such as Dancing with the Stars, Enough Rope, Who Wants to Be a Millionaire, and This Is Your Life.

In 2011, Hanson was a contestant on The Celebrity Apprentice.

Following her successful relaunch of Pauline Hanson's One Nation party at the 2016 federal Senate election, with four senators elected, including herself, a documentary was made by the Special Broadcasting Service (SBS) entitled Pauline Hanson: Please Explain!.

=== Properties, residence and shareholdings ===
As of 2010, Hanson was living on a large property in Beaudesert, Queensland.

Hanson purchased an investment property in Maitland, New South Wales, in 2012, selling it in 2023 for $1.1 million. As of January 2026, Hanson owns two properties in Queensland.

Hanson has shareholdings in BCB Coal, Webjet, and AMP.

=== Relationship with Gina Rinehart ===
Hanson has a personal and political friendship with Australian mining magnate and billionaire Gina Rinehart. In January 2025, Hanson and Rinehart were seen together at lunch whilst on a holiday in Thailand. Hanson has used Rinehart's private jets for travel, including a trip to the U.S. in late 2025 to attend the Conservative Political Action Conference and events at US President Donald Trump's Mar-a-Lago resort. She has also stayed in Rinehart's Palm Beach residence in Florida.

Numerous other occasions include using the private jet of Rinehart-owned company S. Kidman & Co domestically for travel along with One Nation Senator Sean Bell. Hanson did not disclose this flight until after her office was contacted by The Guardian, violating Senate rules requiring the declaration of gifts, including sponsored travel, within 35 days for goods exceeding $300 in value. In October 2025, Hanson took two trips to attend a function connected with Rinehart, as well as One Nation fundraisers and branch openings, costing the taxpayer $13,000.

In April 2026, Hanson was gifted a Cirrus G7 plane and $2 million by Rinehart to assist with One Nation's electoral campaigning.

== Published media ==
=== Books ===
Soon after her election to Parliament, Hanson's book Pauline Hanson—the Truth: on Asian immigration, the Aboriginal question, the gun debate and the future of Australia was published. In it she makes claims of Aboriginal cannibalism, in particular that Aboriginal women ate their babies and tribes cannibalised their members. Hanson told the media that the reason for these claims of cannibalism was to "demonstrate the savagery of Aboriginal society".

David Ettridge, the One Nation party director, said that the book's claims were intended to correct "misconceptions" about Aboriginal history. These alleged misconceptions were said to be relevant to modern-day Aboriginal welfare funding. He asserted that "the suggestion that we should be feeling some concern for modern day Aborigines for suffering in the past is balanced a bit by the alternative view of whether you can feel sympathy for people who eat their babies". The book predicted that in 2050 Australia would have a lesbian president of Chinese-Indian background called Poona Li Hung who would be a cyborg. In 2004, Hanson said that the book was "written by some other people who actually put my name to it" and that, while she held the copyright in the book, she was unaware that much of the material was being published under her name.

In March 2007, Hanson published her autobiography, Untamed and Unashamed.

In 2018, Hanson and Tony Abbott launched a collection of Hanson's speeches, Pauline: In Her Own Words, compiled by journalist Tom Ravlic.

=== Movies ===
In January 2026, Hanson released a movie titled A Super Progressive Movie.

== In art ==
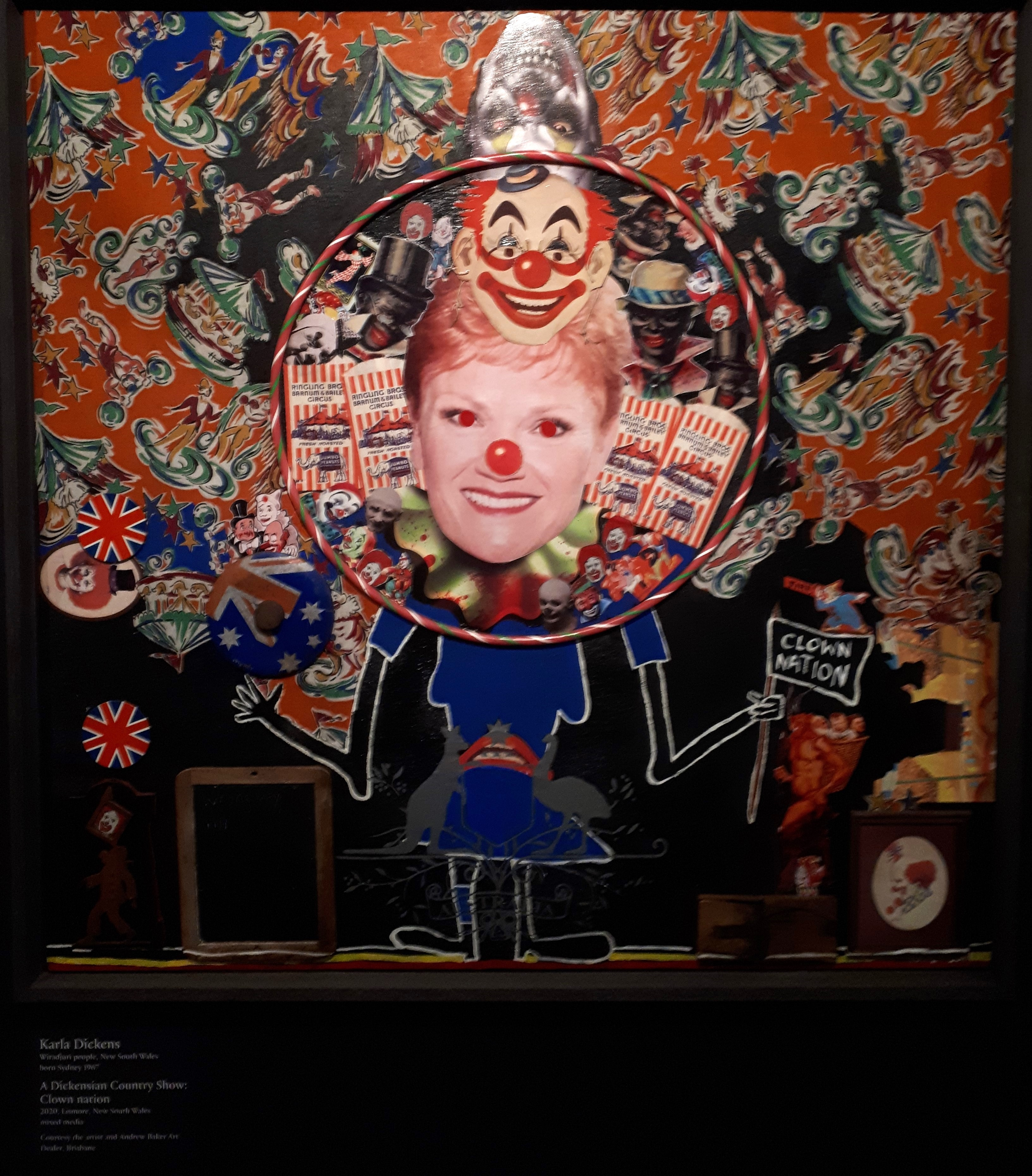
Clown Nation, by Karla Dickens

Aboriginal artist Karla Dickens represented Hanson in a collage entitled Clown Nation, which included Hanson's photograph, in a series called A Dickensian Country Show. It was shown in the 2020 Adelaide Biennial of Australian Art at the Art Gallery of South Australia, an exhibition titled "Monster Theatres".

In the 2017 Bald Archies, Hanson was featured prominently with one such artwork including Told Ya painted by Jack G Kennedy.

In 2023, Merry Sparks painted a picture of Hanson styled after Mao Zedong, utilising red colours associated with the Chinese Communist Party.

Parliament of Australia
Preceded by Les Scott	Member for Oxley; 1996–1998	Succeeded by Bernie Ripoll
