= One Nation NSW =

Former political party in New South Wales, Australia

- Leader: David Oldfield (2000–2004); Judith Newson (2004–2007)
- Founded: 8 October 2000; 26 years ago
- Dissolved: 2007; 19 years ago
- Split from: One Nation
- Headquarters: Sydney, Australia
- Ideology: Hansonism; Right-wing populism
- Political position: Right-wing
- NSW Legislative Council: 1 / 42 (2000–2004)

One Nation NSW was a minor Australian political party that operated exclusively in the state of New South Wales (NSW) from 2000 to 2007. The party was a splinter group of Pauline Hanson's One Nation (PHON).

It was a socially conservative right-wing populist party with policies similar to that of the One Nation party in Queensland and Western Australia. These included reduced immigration levels, an end to Australia's policy of multiculturalism, and an end to what it perceived to be overly favourable treatment of Aboriginal Australians.

The party arose as a result of internal divisions within PHON in October 2000, after Pauline Hanson expelled David Oldfield, co-founder of PHON and the sole representative of that party in the NSW State Parliament. Hanson accused Oldfield of abusing his authority, usurping power, and setting up alternative political parties under his control. His expulsion created even more instability in the party, which was constantly embroiled in scandal and internal strife; as a result, One Nation NSW was formed in 2001. The new party took advantage of electoral registration laws to register itself as a political party under the "One Nation" name with the NSW electoral commission, and achieved registration in April 2002. The effect of this was that the "official" One Nation party was unable to gain registration for NSW elections, and therefore any candidates which that party chose to stand at state elections could not use the party name. This resulted in the unusual situation of having two parties named "One Nation"; the official party could contest federal elections in NSW under the "One Nation" banner as it held that name with the federal electoral authorities, but could not register with the NSW Electoral Commission; only the Oldfield group, which was not registered federally, but held the "One Nation" name at the state level, could run under that name in state elections.

One Nation NSW encountered some internal ruptures in 2002–2003 during the preselection process for the March 2003 NSW election. Brian Burston, a former National Director of PHON, had been preselected by a party conference in December 2002 for 1st place on the party ticket for the election to the Upper House, the Legislative Council (LC). Oldfield, however, had intended that his wife, Lisa Oldfield, secure this position. Therefore, he summoned a second meeting of party members in January 2003, which saw a reversal of the December decision to give Burston the top spot on the ticket in favour of Lisa Oldfield. Burston and his supporters filed legal action, and the court upheld the initial party decision of December, which gave Burston the leading position on the ticket.

At the March election, One Nation NSW achieved only 1.5% of the primary vote compared to 6.3% for PHON in the previous 1999 election that saw Oldfield elected. This result was substantially below the 4.55% election quota, and consequently, Burston failed to get elected. Apart from the internal feuding which affected the party's performance was that Hanson also ran in the election as a grouped independent with support from the "official" One Nation party, and this fractured the One Nation vote. Hanson polled slightly better than Burston's group, achieving 1.9%, and narrowly missed gaining the last LC spot.

After the 2003 election, One Nation NSW became largely inactive; the party did not maintain a website and drew very little media attention; indeed, many Australian political commentators were not aware that two separate One Nation parties continued to operate in NSW at this time. Oldfield resigned from the party in December 2004 to serve the remainder of his term as an independent. His term expired at the 2007 state election; he did not seek re-election. One Nation NSW, by then under the leadership of Judith Newson, theoretically met all the necessary registration criteria to achieve registration for the 2007 election, but did not contest the election. The NSW Electoral Commission deregistered the party the same year, effectively bringing its existence to an end.

== Election results ==
Legislative Council
Election year	# of overall votes	% of overall vote	# of overall seats	+/–	Notes
2003	55,396	1.49 (#8)	0 / 21	▲	

== See also ==
- List of political parties in Australia
