= John Pasquarelli =

Australian politician (born 1937)

Member of the House of Assembly
- In office 1964–1968
- Preceded by: New seat
- Succeeded by: James Meanggarum
- Constituency: Angoram

Personal details
- Born: 15 February 1937 (age 89) Brisbane, Queensland, Australia
- Citizenship: Australian
- Other political affiliations: Liberal (1987)

John Pasquarelli (born 15 February 1937) is an Australian former politician. He served as a member of the House of Assembly of Papua and New Guinea from 1964 to 1968, and as an advisor to One Nation leader Pauline Hanson.

== Biography ==
Born in 1937, Pasquarelli was educated at Ballarat Grammar School before studying law at the University of Queensland. He worked in the opal fields at Coober Pedy for a year, before becoming a cadet patrol officer in the Territory of Papua and New Guinea in 1961. In 1962, he resigned in order to work as a crocodile marksman and set up an artefacts business. He subsequently donated numerous items to the Papua New Guinea Museum.

A right-wing conservative and supporter of Rhodesian Prime Minister Ian Smith, Pasquarelli successfully contested the 1964 elections to the new House of Assembly, the first elections held in the territory under universal suffrage, becoming MHA for the Angoram constituency. He did not stand for re-election in 1968 after becoming disillusioned by the lack of development in Sepik, and returned to Australia later the same year. He returned to the Sepik and in 1971 he built the Karawari Lodge, which he operated for a number of years. Upon Papua New Guinea gaining independence in 1975 he finally returned to Australia.

Back in Australia, Pasquarelli unsuccessfully contested the Jagajaga electorate as the Liberal Party candidate in the 1987 federal elections, losing to the incumbent Labor MP Peter Staples. In 1996, he went to Western Australia in 1996 to assist anti-immigration former Labor MP Graeme Campbell in his re-election campaign as an independent. After the election, he became an advisor to the newly elected MP Pauline Hanson, in which capacity he reportedly wrote her maiden speech.

In December 1996, he was sacked by Hanson, which he blamed on David Oldfield. Pasquarelli subsequently became a prominent commentator on Hanson and her One Nation party. Though he was vehemently critical of Oldfield and other One Nation figures, he remained supportive of Hanson personally. In 1998, he published a book about his experience with Hanson, The Pauline Hanson Story: By the Man Who Knows.

Pasquarelli ran as an independent in Bendigo in the 2001 elections, but finished eighth out of nine candidates with 1,073 votes. In 2017, he worked for Liberal National Party MP George Christensen as an advisor.

== See also ==
- Politics of Australia
