= Pauline's United Australia Party =

- Abbreviation: Pauline's UAP; PUAP
- Leader: Pauline Hanson
- Founded: 24 May 2007; 19 years ago
- Registered: 20 September 2007; 19 years ago
- Dissolved: 17 March 2010; 16 years ago
- Split from: One Nation
- Headquarters: PO Box 428; Ipswich, Queensland
- Ideology: Hansonism; Australian nationalism Social conservatism Protectionism; Anti-Asian sentiment Anti-immigration
- Political position: Far-right
- Slogan: Protecting the Australian way of life

Pauline's United Australia Party (PUAP) was an Australian far-right political party launched by One Nation founder Pauline Hanson on 24 May 2007 after disputes within her former party led to her separation from it. It was registered by the Australian Electoral Commission on 20 September 2007. The party contested the 2007 federal election with no success, and was voluntarily deregistered on 17 March 2010.

== History ==
=== Founding ===
Hanson announced the foundation of the party on 24 May 2007. The party draws on the name but is unrelated to the historic United Australia Party which existed from 1931 to 1945. Hanson formed the party in order to ensure that her name appeared above the line (as per the voting method in Australian federal elections) rather than simply below the line amongst a list of independent candidates.

The party's slogan was "Protecting the Australian way of life". Hanson hired singer-songwriter Chris Callaghan to write and sing a song called "The Australian Way of Life", which was used by the party in election ads. The song trended in the United Kingdom as a "racist" song, despite Callaghan intending the song to represent an open attitude towards immigrants and multiculturalism.

=== 2007 federal election ===
Hanson stood for the Australian Senate in the state of Queensland during the 2007 federal election, in which she received 101,461 first preference votes, representing 4.2% of the statewide vote.

Brian Burston, Hanson's former One Nation adviser and future Senator, also stood for the Senate in the state of New South Wales and received 39,807 votes, which was less than 1% of the total votes.

=== Deregistration ===
Hanson voluntarily de-registered the party on 17 March 2010 after announcing her intention to relocate to the United Kingdom. Her planned emigration did not occur, but the party remained de-registered.

== Controversies ==
In 2007, it was revealed that Bob Hutton, a volunteer for the PUAP campaign, was convicted of raping two children in 2003. Despite being aware of the allegations against Hutton — including the fact that Hutton was on the national child offender registry at the time —, Hanson defended Hutton and claimed that he was innocent, stating "[i]f I thought Bob was guilty of that I wouldn't have him around me."

In 2008, party treasurer Graham McDonald alleged that Hanson secretly transferred $200,000 from party accounts into her own personal accounts. An investigation by Queensland Police into the incident began the following year, but no charges were made.

== Policies ==
Per Hanson's website, the party's policies were:

- Abolition of multiculturalism
- End mass immigration and reduce immigration from non-Western, Asian countries
- End the importation of foreign doctors and offer free education to prospective Australian doctors, on the condition that they accept a placement to any area needing a doctor.
- Stop amalgamation of councils.
- Nationalise the water industry; oppose privatisation efforts

== Federal parliament ==
Senate
Election year	# of overall votes	% of overall vote	# of overall seats won	# of overall seats	+/–	Notes
2007	141,268	1.12 (#6/24)	0 / 40	0 / 76	▲0	

== See also ==
- Hansonism
- Personal party
