= Len Harris (politician) =

Australian politician

Senator for Queensland
- In office 1 July 1999 – 30 June 2005
- Preceded by: Heather Hill
- Succeeded by: Barnaby Joyce

Personal details
- Born: 22 September 1943 (age 83) Brisbane, Queensland
- Party: The Silent Majority (2021–present)
- Other political affiliations: One Nation
- Occupation: Businessman

Leonard William Harris (born 22 September 1943) is an Australian politician who was a One Nation Senator representing the state of Queensland from 1999 until 2005. He took his seat in September 1999, after a successful challenge to the election in October 1998 of Heather Hill, on the basis that, although a naturalised Australian, she had not renounced her childhood United Kingdom citizenship and was thus ineligible to sit in the Australian Parliament.

== Political career ==
Harris was born in Brisbane and was a self-employed businessman and gold miner. Prior to being chosen as the number two Senate candidate for One Nation at the 1998 election, he was an unsuccessful candidate at the 1997 Australian Constitutional Convention election, running as an ungrouped candidate on the "Retention of the Existing Constitution" ticket. He came briefly to prominence during the 2003 debate on the legislative reforms to tertiary education, proposed by federal Education Minister Brendan Nelson. After initially indicating he would vote against the legislation, Harris later changed his mind and allowed the reform package to pass, much to the annoyance of student organisations.

By the time of the 2004 election One Nation was seriously in decline, and Harris was expected to struggle to retain his seat. With a drastic fall in the One Nation vote nationally, he lost his seat, polling only 0.2 of a quota. His term expired on 30 June 2005.
