= David Ettridge =

Australian businessman (born 1945)

National Director of One Nation
- In office 11 April 1997 – 15 January 2000; Alongside David Oldfield
- President: Pauline Hanson
- Preceded by: Party established; office created
- Succeeded by: John Fischer

Personal details
- Born: David William Ettridge; 8 June 1945 (age 81) Adelaide, South Australia, Australia
- Citizenship: Australian
- Party: Independent (after 2002)
- Other political affiliations: Pauline Hanson's One Nation (1997–2002)
- Occupation: Corporate fundraising director (United Nations International Children's Emergency Fund) (World Vision Australia); Business marketing strategist (self-employed) (Pauline Hanson's One Nation)
- Profession: Businessman philanthropist politician
- Website: davidettridge.com

David William Ettridge (born 8 June 1945) is an Australian businessman who co-founded Pauline Hanson's One Nation in 1997 with Pauline Hanson and David Oldfield.

Ettridge was One Nation's professional fundraiser and administered and marketed the One Nation party. Leading a small team he helped to set up 350 branches throughout Australia and admitted 18,000 members to the party.

On 20 August 2003, a jury from the District Court of Queensland convicted Hanson and Ettridge of electoral fraud and the Chief Judge sentenced both to three years without parole for fraudulently registering the One Nation Party. Prosecutors had alleged that the use of a list of 500 paid-up members of a One Nation supporters group as members for the purpose of registering the party had been fraudulent. A police report which advised the Queensland Director of Public Prosecutions that no offence had been committed was never revealed by the Crown and DPP. However, on 6 November 2003, the Queensland Court of Appeal quashed both convictions and Ettridge and Hanson were released from jail. In 2004, Ettridge published a book regarding the fraud conviction and acquittal.

Following an extensive Queensland Fraud Squad investigation, the Queensland Police advised the Queensland Director of Public Prosecutions that no offence had been committed. Ettridge used his own money for his legal defense, on the understanding that One Nation would repay him, but he states that he has never been repaid.
