= Electoral results for the district of Everton =

Queensland, Australia, district election results

This is a list of electoral results for the electoral district of Everton in Queensland state elections.

== Members for Everton ==
Member	Party	Term
Gerry Jones	Labor	1972–1974
Brian Lindsay	Liberal	1974–1977
Glen Milliner	Labor	1977–1992
Rod Welford	Labor	1992–2009
Murray Watt	Labor	2009–2012
Tim Mander	Liberal National	2012–present

== Election results ==
=== Elections in the 2020s ===
2024 Queensland state election: Everton
Party	Candidate	Votes	%	±%
Liberal National	Tim Mander	17,710	49.43	+3.64
Labor	Michelle Byard	12,106	33.79	−4.00
Greens	Brent McDowall	4,370	12.20	+3.02
One Nation	Alan Buchbach	1,643	4.58	+1.47
Total formal votes		35,829	97.26	−0.48
Informal votes		1,010	2.74	+0.48
Turnout		36,839	92.70	+0.66
Two-party-preferred result
Liberal National	Tim Mander	19,801	55.27	+3.03
Labor	Michelle Byard	16,028	44.73	−3.03
Liberal National hold		Swing	+3.03	

2020 Queensland state election: Everton
Party	Candidate	Votes	%	±%
Liberal National	Tim Mander	15,455	45.79	−5.97
Labor	Danielle Shankey	12,755	37.79	+1.91
Greens	Helen Rath	3,098	9.18	−3.17
One Nation	Mal Johnson	1,051	3.11	+3.11
Legalise Cannabis	Frank Jordan	871	2.58	+2.58
Informed Medical Options	Joanne Dissanayake	264	0.78	+0.78
United Australia	Simon Russ	152	0.45	+0.45
Independent	Jabez Wells	105	0.31	+0.31
Total formal votes		33,751	97.74	+1.52
Informal votes		782	2.26	−1.52
Turnout		34,533	92.04	+0.70
Two-party-preferred result
Liberal National	Tim Mander	17,630	52.24	−2.71
Labor	Danielle Shankey	16,121	47.76	+2.71
Liberal National hold		Swing	−2.71	

=== Elections in the 2010s ===
2017 Queensland state election: Everton
Party	Candidate	Votes	%	±%
Liberal National	Tim Mander	16,756	51.8	+2.2
Labor	David Greene	11,616	35.9	−4.2
Greens	Bridget Clinch	3,997	12.3	+2.4
Total formal votes		32,369	96.2	−2.1
Informal votes		1,273	3.8	+2.1
Turnout		33,642	91.3	+0.8
Two-party-preferred result
Liberal National	Tim Mander	17,784	54.9	+2.9
Labor	David Greene	14,585	45.1	−2.9
Liberal National hold		Swing	+2.9	

2015 Queensland state election: Everton
Party	Candidate	Votes	%	±%
Liberal National	Tim Mander	14,601	49.34	−8.16
Labor	Jeff Frew	11,910	40.24	+9.14
Greens	Aidan Norrie	3,084	10.42	+3.21
Total formal votes		29,595	98.31	−0.16
Informal votes		508	1.69	+0.16
Turnout		30,103	92.38	−1.27
Two-party-preferred result
Liberal National	Tim Mander	14,965	51.77	−11.38
Labor	Jeff Frew	13,944	48.23	+11.38
Liberal National hold		Swing	−11.38	

2012 Queensland state election: Everton
Party	Candidate	Votes	%	±%
Liberal National	Tim Mander	16,364	57.50	+13.38
Labor	Murray Watt	8,851	31.10	−13.29
Greens	Bruce Hallett	2,053	7.21	−1.86
Katter's Australian	Denym Witherow	1,192	4.19	+4.19
Total formal votes		28,460	98.47	+0.10
Informal votes		442	1.53	−0.10
Turnout		28,902	93.64	+0.38
Two-party-preferred result
Liberal National	Tim Mander	17,125	63.15	+14.54
Labor	Murray Watt	9,991	36.85	−14.54
Liberal National gain from Labor		Swing	+14.54	

=== Elections in the 2000s ===
2009 Queensland state election: Everton
Party	Candidate	Votes	%	±%
Labor	Murray Watt	12,304	44.4	−8.4
Liberal National	Troy Knox	12,229	44.1	+11.0
Greens	Bruce Hallett	2,513	9.1	+1.1
DS4SEQ	Anthony Vella	674	2.4	+2.4
Total formal votes		27,720	98.3	
Informal votes		460	1.7	
Turnout		28,180	93.3	
Two-party-preferred result
Labor	Murray Watt	13,605	51.4	−9.2
Liberal National	Troy Knox	12,870	48.6	+9.2
Labor hold		Swing	−9.2	

2006 Queensland state election: Everton
Party	Candidate	Votes	%	±%
Labor	Rod Welford	13,382	52.0	−4.6
Liberal	Ken King	8,511	33.1	−1.9
Greens	Bruce Hallett	2,015	7.8	+1.5
Family First	Dale Shuttleworth	1,823	7.1	+7.1
Total formal votes		25,731	98.4	+0.1
Informal votes		415	1.6	−0.1
Turnout		26,146	92.2	−1.4
Two-party-preferred result
Labor	Rod Welford	14,413	60.1	−1.5
Liberal	Ken King	9,549	39.9	+1.5
Labor hold		Swing	−1.5	

2004 Queensland state election: Everton
Party	Candidate	Votes	%	±%
Labor	Rod Welford	14,664	56.6	−6.2
Liberal	Tracy Palmer-Davis	9,076	35.0	+7.1
Greens	Debbi Stainsby	1,624	6.3	+6.3
Independent	Leo De Marchi	556	2.1	+2.1
Total formal votes		25,920	98.3	+0.3
Informal votes		438	1.7	−0.3
Turnout		26,358	93.6	−0.8
Two-party-preferred result
Labor	Rod Welford	15,367	61.6	−5.9
Liberal	Tracy Palmer-Davis	9,581	38.4	+5.9
Labor hold		Swing	−5.9	

2001 Queensland state election: Everton
Party	Candidate	Votes	%	±%
Labor	Rod Welford	15,719	62.8	+15.8
Liberal	John Dangerfield	6,990	27.9	−4.8
City Country Alliance	Lynette Edwards	2,302	9.2	+9.2
Total formal votes		25,011	98.0	
Informal votes		517	2.0	
Turnout		25,528	94.4	
Two-party-preferred result
Labor	Rod Welford	16,063	67.5	+11.8
Liberal	John Dangerfield	7,749	32.5	−11.8
Labor hold		Swing	+11.8	

=== Elections in the 1990s ===
1998 Queensland state election: Everton
Party	Candidate	Votes	%	±%
Labor	Rod Welford	10,686	47.2	−3.7
Liberal	Karen Jones	7,329	32.4	−16.6
One Nation	Ken Brady	3,481	15.4	+15.4
Democrats	Brett Matthews	1,120	5.0	+5.0
Total formal votes		22,616	98.8	+0.6
Informal votes		269	1.2	−0.6
Turnout		22,885	94.6	+0.6
Two-party-preferred result
Labor	Rod Welford	12,194	56.0	+5.0
Liberal	Karen Jones	9,585	44.0	−5.0
Labor hold		Swing	+5.0	

1995 Queensland state election: Everton
Party	Candidate	Votes	%	±%
Labor	Rod Welford	10,790	51.0	−8.6
Liberal	Judy Robertson	10,368	49.0	+23.2
Total formal votes		21,158	98.2	+0.6
Informal votes		387	1.8	−0.6
Turnout		21,545	94.0	
Labor hold		Swing	−10.7	

1992 Queensland state election: Everton
Party	Candidate	Votes	%	±%
Labor	Rod Welford	12,185	59.6	+2.7
Liberal	Bryan Carpenter	5,277	25.8	−5.7
National	John Jurss	2,999	14.7	+5.2
Total formal votes		20,461	97.6	
Informal votes		495	2.4	
Turnout		20,956	93.1	
Two-party-preferred result
Labor	Rod Welford	12,445	61.7	+3.3
Liberal	Bryan Carpenter	7,736	38.3	−3.3
Labor hold		Swing	+3.3	

=== Elections in the 1980s ===
1989 Queensland state election: Everton
Party	Candidate	Votes	%	±%
Labor	Glen Milliner	12,165	62.7	+13.3
Liberal	Greg Smith	5,909	30.5	+2.6
National	Peter Kuskie	1,317	6.8	−15.9
Total formal votes		19,391	97.8	−0.8
Informal votes		438	2.2	+0.8
Turnout		19,829	93.9	+0.6
Two-party-preferred result
Labor	Glen Milliner	12,255	63.2	+11.7
Liberal	Greg Smith	7,136	36.8	−11.7
Labor hold		Swing	+11.7	

1986 Queensland state election: Everton
Party	Candidate	Votes	%	±%
Labor	Glen Milliner	8,765	49.4	−3.4
Liberal	Greg Smith	4,940	27.9	+11.6
National	Richard Jackson	4,023	22.7	−8.2
Total formal votes		17,728	98.6	
Informal votes		257	1.4	
Turnout		17,985	93.3	
Two-party-preferred result
Labor	Glen Milliner	9,122	51.5	−2.8
Liberal	Greg Smith	8,606	48.5	+48.5
Labor hold		Swing	−2.8	

1983 Queensland state election: Everton
Party	Candidate	Votes	%	±%
Labor	Glen Milliner	8,412	52.9	+7.5
National	Donald Munro	4,916	30.9	+10.1
Liberal	Gregory Smith	2,588	16.3	−11.3
Total formal votes		15,916	99.1	+0.2
Informal votes		137	0.9	−0.2
Turnout		16,053	94.1	+3.1
Two-party-preferred result
Labor	Glen Milliner	8,990	56.5	+5.8
National	Donald Munro	6,926	43.5	−5.8
Labor hold		Swing	+5.8	

1980 Queensland state election: Everton
Party	Candidate	Votes	%	±%
Labor	Glen Milliner	6,984	45.4	−4.1
Liberal	Brian Burke	4,258	27.6	−17.8
National	Donald Munro	3,211	20.8	+20.8
Democrats	Mark Taylor	946	6.1	+6.1
Total formal votes		15,399	98.9	−0.1
Informal votes		173	1.1	+0.1
Turnout		15,572	91.0	−1.9
Two-party-preferred result
Labor	Glen Milliner	7,814	50.7	−0.3
Liberal	Brian Burke	7,585	49.3	+0.3
Labor hold		Swing	−0.3	

=== Elections in the 1970s ===
1977 Queensland state election: Everton
Party	Candidate	Votes	%	±%
Labor	Glen Milliner	7,150	49.5	
Liberal	Brian Lindsay	6,559	45.4	
Progress	Owen Pershouse	739	5.1	+5.1
Total formal votes		14,448	99.0	
Informal votes		139	1.0	
Turnout		14,587	93.0	
Two-party-preferred result
Labor	Glen Milliner	7,374	51.0	+10.2
Liberal	Brian Lindsay	7,074	49.0	−10.2
Labor gain from Liberal		Swing	+10.2	

1974 Queensland state election: Everton
Party	Candidate	Votes	%	±%
Liberal	Brian Lindsay	5,972	48.3	+24.8
Labor	Gerry Jones	5,652	45.7	−7.9
Queensland Labor	James Doherty	565	4.6	−2.6
Independent	Theoron Toon	169	1.4	−2.0
Total formal votes		12,358	98.5	+0.5
Informal votes		183	1.5	−0.5
Turnout		12,541	91.1	−3.0
Two-party-preferred result
Liberal	Brian Lindsay	6,518	52.7	+11.0
Labor	Gerry Jones	5,840	47.3	−11.0
Liberal gain from Labor		Swing	+11.0	

1972 Queensland state election: Everton
Party	Candidate	Votes	%	±%
Labor	Gerry Jones	5,835	53.6	−6.3
Liberal	Denver Beanland	2,553	23.5	−7.6
Country	Fred Roberts	1,341	12.3	+12.3
Queensland Labor	Lyle Jehn	787	7.2	−1.8
Independent	Theoron Toon	366	3.4	+3.4
Total formal votes		10,882	98.0	
Informal votes		218	2.0	
Turnout		11,100	94.1	
Two-party-preferred result
Labor	Gerry Jones	6,339	58.3	−3.1
Liberal	Denver Beanland	4,543	41.7	+3.1
Labor hold		Swing	−3.1	
