= Candidates of the 2007 Australian federal election =

This article provides details on candidates who stood at the 2007 Australian federal election.

Nominations were formally declared open by the Australian Electoral Commission following the issue of the writ on Wednesday, 17 October 2007. Nominations closed at 12 noon Thursday, 1 November 2007. The received nominations were declared public after 12 noon Friday 2 November 2007.

The election itself was held on Saturday 24 November 2007.

== Redistributions and seat changes ==
- Redistributions of electoral boundaries occurred in New South Wales and Queensland.
  - In New South Wales, the National-held seat of Gwydir was abolished. The Independent-held seat of Calare became notionally National, the Liberal-held seat of Macquarie became notionally Labor, and the Labor-held seat of Parramatta became notionally Liberal.
    - The member for Parkes, John Cobb (National), contested Calare.
  - In Queensland, the notionally National seat of Flynn was created.

== Retiring Members and Senators ==
The following Members of the House of Representatives (denoted "MP") and Senators did not seek another term at the election.

=== Labor ===
- Kim Beazley MP (Brand, WA): announced retirement after losing the Labor Party leadership in December 2006.
- Ann Corcoran MP (Isaacs, Vic): lost preselection in March 2006.
- Graham Edwards MP (Cowan, WA): announced retirement in January 2006.
- Michael Hatton MP (Blaxland, NSW): lost preselection in May 2007.
- Kelly Hoare MP (Charlton, NSW): lost preselection in May 2007.
- Carmen Lawrence MP (Fremantle, WA): announced retirement March 2007.
- Rod Sawford MP (Port Adelaide, SA): announced retirement in August 2006.
- Bob Sercombe MP (Maribyrnong, Vic): announced retirement in February 2006, facing likely preselection defeat.
- Senator George Campbell (NSW): announced retirement in April 2007, facing likely preselection defeat.
- Senator Linda Kirk (SA): lost preselection in June 2007.
- Senator Robert Ray (Vic): did not renominate.

=== Liberal ===
- Bruce Baird MP (Cook, NSW): announced retirement in April 2007.
- Alan Cadman MP (Mitchell, NSW): withdrew candidacy in June 2007, facing likely preselection defeat.
- Trish Draper MP (Makin, SA): announced retirement in July 2006.
- Kay Elson MP (Forde, Qld): announced retirement in October 2006.
- Warren Entsch MP (Leichhardt, Qld): announced retirement in January 2006.
- David Jull MP (Fadden, Qld): announced retirement in January 2007.
- Jackie Kelly MP (Lindsay, NSW): announced retirement in May 2007.
- Geoff Prosser MP (Forrest, WA): announced retirement in June 2006.
- Barry Wakelin MP (Grey, SA): announced retirement in August 2006.
- Senator Rod Kemp (Vic): announced retirement in May 2006.
- Senator Ross Lightfoot (WA): announced retirement in April 2007, facing likely preselection defeat.
- Senator Kay Patterson (Vic): announced retirement in January 2006.
- Senator John Watson (Tas): lost preselection in May 2007.

=== National ===
- John Anderson MP (Gwydir, NSW): announced retirement after stepping down as National Party leader and Deputy Prime Minister in June 2005.
- Ian Causley MP (Page, NSW): announced retirement in October 2006.
- Senator Sandy Macdonald (NSW): announced retirement in October 2006 after losing preselection for second spot on the Coalition Senate ticket.

=== Democrats ===
- Senator Andrew Murray (WA): announced retirement in July 2006.
- Senator Natasha Stott Despoja (SA): announced retirement in October 2006.

=== Independent ===
- Peter Andren MP (Calare, NSW): In March 2007, Andren declared his intention to retire from his House of Representatives seat and run for a NSW Senate seat. Subsequently, Andren was diagnosed with cancer and in August 2007 he announced his retirement from politics altogether. Andren died on 3 November 2007.
- Harry Quick MP (Franklin, Tas): announced retirement in August 2005 (he was expelled from the ALP in August 2007 and sat for the remainder of his term as an independent).

== House of Representatives ==
Sitting members are shown in bold text. Successful candidates are highlighted in the relevant colour. Where there is possible confusion, an asterisk (*) is also used.

=== Australian Capital Territory ===
Electorate	Held by	Labor	Coalition	Greens	Other
Canberra	Labor	**Annette Ellis**	Natalie Colbert	Amanda Bresnan	John Holder (CEC)
Fraser	Labor	**Bob McMullan**	Troy Williams	Meredith Hunter	Jim Arnold (CEC); Darren Churchill (Dem); Farida Iqbal (SA); Kerri Taranto (Ind)

=== New South Wales ===
Electorate	Held by	Labor	Coalition	Greens	Family First	CDP	Other
Banks	Labor	**Daryl Melham**	Bruce Morrow (Lib)	Susan Roberts		Stephen Chavura	Don Nguyen (LDP); Huu Khoa Nguyen (CEC)
Barton	Labor	**Robert McClelland**	John La Mela (Lib)	Michele McKenzie		Chris Svolos	
Bennelong	Liberal	Maxine McKew	**John Howard** (Lib)	Lindsay Peters	Lorraine Markwell	Robyn Peebles	David Allen (Ind); Graeme Cordiner (Ind); Peter Goldfinch (Dem); David Leyonhjelm (LDP); Gavin Spencer (CEC); Yusuf Tahir (-); Margherita Tracanelli (CCC); Victor Waterson (ON)
Berowra	Liberal	Michael Colnan	**Philip Ruddock** (Lib)	Wendy McMurdo	Sam Ellis	Ray Levick	Rob McFarlane (Dem); Mick Gallagher (Ind)
Blaxland	Labor	Jason Clare	Mark Majewski (Lib)	John Ky	Gabrielle Kent	Chris McLachlan	Raul Bassi (SA); Harry Stavrinos (Ind); Bob Vinnicombe (ON)
Bradfield	Liberal	Victoria Brookman	**Brendan Nelson** (Lib)	Susie Gemmell	James Turnbull	Witold Wiszniewski	Robert Butler (CEC)
Calare	National	Michael Allen	**John Cobb** (Nat)	Jeremy Buckingham			Gavin Priestley (Ind); David Simpson (CEC)
Charlton	Labor	Greg Combet	Lindsay Paterson (Lib)	Suzanne Pritchard		Jim Kendall	Patrick Barry (Ind); Terry Cook (SEP); David Stow (CEC); Stuart Ulrich (Ind)
Chifley	Labor	**Roger Price**	Jess Diaz (Lib)	John Forrester	Evan Jewell	Dave Vincent	James Cogan (SEP); Wayne Hyland (Ind); Louise Kedwell (ON); Amarjit Tanda (Ind)
Cook	Liberal	Mark Buttigieg	Scott Morrison (Lib)	Naomi Waizer	Ari Katsoulas	Beth Smith	Patricia Poulos (Ind); Richard Putral (ON); Graeme Strang (Ind)
Cowper	National	Paul Sekfy	**Luke Hartsuyker** (Nat)	John Carty	Flavia Arapi-Nunez	Deborah Lions	Leon Belgrave (LDP)
Cunningham	Labor	**Sharon Bird**	Colin Fowler (Lib)	Michael Organ	Jemma Tribe	Nolene Norsworthy	John Flanagan (NCP); Jess Moore (SA)
Dobell	Liberal	Craig Thomson	**Ken Ticehurst** (Lib)	Scott Rickard	Hadden Ervin	Michael Darby	Graeme Bird (LDP); Doug Eaton (Ind); Steve Hughes (CEC)
Eden-Monaro	Liberal	Mike Kelly	**Gary Nairn** (Lib)	Keith Hughes	Peter Harris	Matthew Chivers	Tim Quilty (LDP); Acacia Rose (Ind)
Farrer	Liberal	Chris Ryan	**Sussan Ley** (Lib)	Darran Stonehouse	Rhonda Lever		Douglas Henderson (CCE); Pat Mathers (CEC)
Fowler	Labor	**Julia Irwin**	Rose Torossian (Lib)	Vlaudin Vega		Paul Termeulen	
Gilmore	Liberal	Neil Reilly	**Joanna Gash** (Lib)	Ben van der Wijngaart	Brett Greenhalgh	Bohdan Brumerskyj	Simon Blake (CCE); Warwick Hunt (CEC); Of The Above None (Ind); Kevin Ramsey (LDP)
Grayndler	Labor	**Anthony Albanese**	Daniel Caffery (Lib)	Saeed Khan		Ehab Hennien	Jeffrey Gabriel (Dem); Pip Hinman (SA); Patrick O'Connor (SEP)
Greenway	Liberal	Michael Vassili	**Louise Markus** (Lib)	Leigh Williams	Joanne Muller	John Phillips	F Ivor (Ind); Goran Reves (CEC)
Hughes	Liberal	Greg Holland	**Danna Vale** (Lib)	Jamie Paterson	Julie Mezyed	John Vanderjagt	
Hume	Liberal	David Grant	**Alby Schultz** (Lib)	Jim Clark	Cathy Trent	Geoff Peet	Lindsay Cosgrove (CEC)
Hunter	Labor	**Joel Fitzgibbon**	Beth Black (Nat)	Jan Davis		Bernie Neville	Daniel Albury (CEC); John Harvey (CCC)
Kingsford Smith	Labor	**Peter Garrett**	Caroline Beinke (Lib)	Sue Mahony		Marcus Campbell	Alex Safari (SEP)
Lindsay	Liberal	David Bradbury	Karen Chijoff (Lib)	Lesley Edwards	Iris Muller	Andrew Green	Grant Bayley (LDP); Lisa Harrold (Ind); Kerry McNally (Ind)
Lowe	Labor	**John Murphy**	Jim Tsolakis (Lib)	Marc Rerceretnam		Bill Shailer	
Lyne	National	James Langley	**Mark Vaile** (Nat)	Susie Russell		Robert Waldron	Jamie Harrison (Ind); Graeme Muldoon (CEC); Rodger Riach (Ind); Stewart Scott-Irving (Ind); Barry Wright (Ind)
Macarthur	Liberal	Nick Bleasdale	**Pat Farmer** (Lib)	Ben Raue	Douglas Rauch	Godwin Goh	Samantha Elliott-Halls (Dem); Andy Thompson (NCP)
Mackellar	Liberal	Chris Sharpe	**Bronwyn Bishop** (Lib)	Craige McWhirter		Michael Hubbard	John Adams (CCC); Clinton Barnes (Dem); Matt McLellan (Ind)
Macquarie	Labor	Bob Debus	**Kerry Bartlett** (Lib)	Carmel McCallum	Charles Liptak	Robert Gifford	Kirk Fletcher (LDP); Michael Segedin (CEC); Tim Williams (Ind)
Mitchell	Liberal	Nigel Gould	Alex Hawke (Lib)	Toni Wright-Turner	Jarrod Graetz	Darryl Allen	James Fiander (CCC); Jordie Bodlay (Ind)
New England	Independent	Luke Brand	Phil Betts (Nat)	Bruce Taylor			Brian Dettman (ON); **Tony Windsor*** (Ind); Richard Witten (CEC)
Newcastle	Labor	**Sharon Grierson**	Krysia Walker (Lib)	Charmian Eckersley	Malcolm East	Milton Caine	Aaron Buman (Ind); Joel Curry (Ind); Noel Holt (SEP); Aaron Johnson (Dem); Geoff Payne (SA)
North Sydney	Liberal	Mike Bailey	**Joe Hockey** (Lib)	Ted Nixon	John Cafferatta	Arie Baalbergen	Marcus Aussie-Stone (Ind); Kundan Misra (CEC); Barry Thompson (CCC)
Page	National	Janelle Saffin	Chris Gulaptis (Nat)	Theo Jongen	Mirian Vega	Rhonda Avasalu	Ben Beatty (LDP); Doug Behn (Ind); John Culverwell (CEC); Tony Kane (Ind); Julia Melland (Dem)
Parkes	National	Margaret Patriarca	Mark Coulton (Nat)	Matt Parmeter			Bruce Haigh (Ind); Tim Horan (Ind); Michael Kiely (CCC); Richard Stringer (CEC)
Parramatta	Liberal	**Julie Owens**	Colin Robinson (Lib)	Astrid O'Neill	Rene Hernandez	Sam Baissari	Brian Buckley (Ind); Rachel Evans (SA); Chris Gordon (SEP); Alasdair Macdonald (-); Graham Nickols (LDP)
Paterson	Liberal	Jim Arneman	**Bob Baldwin** (Lib)	Judy Donnelly	Christopher Stokes	Heather Haynes	John Hamberger (ON); Paul Hennelly (FPY); Tony King (CEC)
Prospect	Labor	**Chris Bowen**	Lily Arthur (Lib)	Lizza Gebilagin	Carolyn Lever	Jason Callander	
Reid	Labor	**Laurie Ferguson**	Ronney Oueik (Lib)	Mark Lipscombe	Veronica Lambert	Alex Sharah	Silma Ihram (Dem); Hal Johnson (CEC)
Richmond	Labor	**Justine Elliot**	Sue Page (Nat)	Giovanni Ebono		Barbara Raymond	Daniel Farmilo (LDP); Graham McCallum (CEC); Scott Sledge (Dem)
Riverina	National	Peter Knox	**Kay Hull** (Nat)	Ray Goodlass			Craig Hesketh (ON); Gary Johnson (CEC)
Robertson	Liberal	Belinda Neal	**Jim Lloyd** (Lib)	Mira Wroblewski	Daniel Le	George Grant	Helen Ryan (ON); Nicholas Tomlin (CEC)
Shortland	Labor	**Jill Hall**	Jon Kealy (Lib)	Keith Parsons	Matthew Reeves	Les Wallace	
Sydney	Labor	**Tanya Plibersek**	Georgina Anderson (Lib)	Jenny Leong		John Lee	Adrian Ford (CEC); Mayo Materazzo (Dem); Jane Ward (Ind)
Throsby	Labor	**Jennie George**	Stuart Wright (Lib)	Peter Moran		Scott Deakes	
Warringah	Liberal	Hugh Zochling	**Tony Abbott** (Lib)	Conny Harris	Brent Middleton	Bill McCudden	Georgina Johanson (Dem); Patricia Petersen (Ind); Goronwy Price (CCE)
Watson	Labor	**Tony Burke**	Philip Mansour (Lib)	Christine Donayre	Merry Foy	Josephine Sammut	Ronald Poulsen (-)
Wentworth	Liberal	George Newhouse	**Malcolm Turnbull** (Lib)	Susan Jarnason	James Adams	Bradley Moloney	Dixie Coulton (CCC); Dani Ecuyer (Ind); Pierce Field (Dem); John Jamieson (CEC); Jonatan Kelu (LDP); Pat Sheil (Ind)
Werriwa	Labor	**Chris Hayes**	Rachel Elliott (Lib)	Neerav Bhatt	Andrew Mills	Hany Gayed	Joe Bryant (Ind)

- Note: Notional party status of Calare, Macquarie and Parramatta altered by redistribution

=== Northern Territory ===
Electorate	Held by	Labor	CLP	Greens	Other
Lingiari	Labor	**Warren Snowdon**	Adam Giles	Emma Young	Maurie Ryan (Ind); Wayne Wright (Ind)
Solomon	Liberal	Damian Hale	**Dave Tollner**	Deborah Hudson	Trudy Campbell (CEC); Jacques Chester (LDP); Maurice Foley (Ind)

=== Queensland ===
Electorate	Held by	Labor	Coalition	Greens	Democrats	Family First	Other
Blair	Liberal	Shayne Neumann	**Cameron Thompson** (Lib)	Peter Luxton	David White	Bevan Smith	Dale Chorley (Ind); Doug Swanborough (LDP); Robert Thies (CEC)
Bonner	Liberal	Kerry Rea	**Ross Vasta** (Lib)	David Wyatt	Vicki Stocks	Stephen Gellatly	Shane Boese (FPY); Lisa Charles (LDP)
Bowman	Liberal	Jason Young	**Andrew Laming** (Lib)	Brad Scott	Paul Holland	Alan Lucas	Dave Chidgey (ON)
Brisbane	Labor	**Arch Bevis**	Ted O'Brien (Lib)	Elizabeth Guthrie	Don Sinnamon	Mark White	Nick Contarino (CEC); Ewan Saunders (SA)
Capricornia	Labor	**Kirsten Livermore**	Scott Kilpatrick (Lib); Robert Mills (Nat)	Paul Bambrick	Anton Prange	Jon Eaton	Bill Ingrey (CEC); Bob Oakes (Ind)
Dawson	National	James Bidgood	**De-Anne Kelly** (Nat)	Peter Bell	Chris Doyle	Rena Lee	Andrew Harris (CEC)
Dickson	Liberal	Fiona McNamara	**Peter Dutton** (Lib)	Howard Nielsen	Peter Kerin	Dale Shuttleworth	Brad Cornwell (LDP); Connie Wood (CDP)
Fadden	Liberal	Rana Watson	Alex Douglas (Nat); Stuart Robert* (Lib)	Mike Beale	Chris Faint	Ross Wilson	Ken Martin (CEC); David Montgomery (Ind); John Walter (ON)
Fairfax	Liberal	Debbie Blumel	**Alex Somlyay** (Lib)	David Norris	Janette Hashemi	Lisa Woods	Max Phillips (Ind); Kevin Savage (ON); Kevin Watt (CEC)
Fisher	Liberal	Darrell Main	**Peter Slipper** (Lib)	Mathew Gray	Carolyn Kerr	Graeme Cumming	Caroline Hutchinson (Ind)
Flynn	National	Chris Trevor	Glenn Churchill (Nat); Jason Rose (Lib)	Marella Pettinato	Julie Noble	Mathew Drysdale	Phillip Costello (Ind); Jarrah Job (LDP); Duncan Scott (Ind)
Forde	Liberal	Brett Raguse	Hajnal Ban (Nat); Wendy Creighton (Lib)	Andy Grodecki	Maaz Syed	Iona Abrahamson	Chris Coyle (Ind); Rod Evans (ON); Danny Hope (CEC)
Griffith	Labor	**Kevin Rudd**	Craig Thomas (Lib)	Willy Bach	Rob Cotterill	Andrew Hassall	P M Howard (Ind); Jim McIlroy (SA); Samantha Myers (LDP)
Groom	Liberal	Chris Meibusch	**Ian Macfarlane** (Lib)	Pauline Collins	Shalina Najeeb	Peter Findlay	Rob Berry (Ind); Rod Jeanneret (Ind); Irene Jones (CEC); Grahame Volker (Ind)
Herbert	Liberal	George Colbran	**Peter Lindsay** (Lib)	Jenny Stirling	Sharon Sheridan	Michael Punshon	Billy Brennan (Ind); Garrie Lynch (Ind); Francis Pauler (ON); Ben Thompson (LDP)
Hinkler	National	Garry Parr	**Paul Neville** (Nat)	Andrew Dickes	Robert Bromwich	Cameron Rub	Roy Wells (Ind)
Kennedy	Independent	Alan Neilan	Ed Morrison (Nat)	Frank Reilly	Nigel Asplin	Keith Douglas	Bill Hankin (ON); **Bob Katter*** (Ind)
Leichhardt	Liberal	Jim Turnour	Ian Crossland (Nat); Charlie McKillop (Lib)	Sue Cory	Bridgette Lennox	Ben Jacobsen	Damien Byrnes (Ind); Tony Hudson (Ind); Selwyn Johnston (Ind); Norman Miller (Ind); Rata Hami Pugh (Ind)
Lilley	Labor	**Wayne Swan**	Scott McConnel (Lib)	Simon Kean Hammerson	Jennifer Cluse	Karen Gray	Aubrey Clark (LDP)
Longman	Liberal	Jon Sullivan	**Mal Brough** (Lib)	Paul Costin	Liz Oss-Emer	Peter Urquhart	Trent MacDonald (LDP); Dan Winniak (CEC)
Maranoa	National	Mike Bathersby	**Bruce Scott** (Nat)	Bob East	Alan Dickson	David Totenhofer	Rod Watson (ON)
McPherson	Liberal	Eddy Sarroff	**Margaret May** (Lib)	Ben O'Callaghan	Lori Carnwell	Kevin Davis	Geoff Cornell (CEC); Tyrone Jackson (Ind)
Moncrieff	Liberal	Sam Miszkowski	**Steven Ciobo** (Lib)	Carla Brandon	Paul Stevenson	James Tayler	Tim Kirchler (SA); Paul Shears (Ind); Liz Thompson (CEC)
Moreton	Liberal	Graham Perrett	**Gary Hardgrave** (Lib)	Emma Hine	Emad Soliman	Steve Christian	Shane Brown (LDP); Andrew Lamb (Ind)
Oxley	Labor	**Bernie Ripoll**	Scott White (Lib)	Austin Lund	Murray Henman	Greg Roy	Brian Haag (CEC)
Petrie	Liberal	Yvette D'Ath	**Teresa Gambaro** (Lib)	Terry Jones	Bruce Carnwell	Sally Vincent	Peter Britt (CDP); Michael Pope (LDP)
Rankin	Labor	**Craig Emerson**	Pete Coulson (Lib)	Neil Cotter	Salam El Marebi	Bert van Manen	Rob Meyers (CEC); Liam Tjia (LDP)
Ryan	Liberal	Ross Daniels	**Michael Johnson** (Lib)	Evan Jones	Jim Page	Leisa Schmid	Jock Mackenzie (LDP); Neville Solomon (CEC); Charles Worringham (Ind)
Wide Bay	National	Tony Lawrence	**Warren Truss** (Nat)	Katherine Webb	Terry Shaw	John Chapman	Martin Essenberg (ON); Cate Molloy (Ind)

=== South Australia ===
Electorate	Held by	Labor	Liberal	Greens	Democrats	Family First	Other
Adelaide	Labor	**Kate Ellis**	Tracy Marsh	Peter Solly	Sandy Biar	Dennis Slape	
Barker	Liberal	Karen Lock	**Patrick Secker**	Andrew Jennings	Justin Sneath	Phil Cornish	Deb Thiele (Nat)
Boothby	Liberal	Nicole Cornes	**Andrew Southcott**	Jodi Kirkby	Craig Bossie	Andrew Cole	David Humphreys (LDP); Ray McGhee (Ind); Barbara Pannach (ON)
Grey	Liberal	Karin Bolton	Rowan Ramsey	Rosalie Garland	Gil Robertson	Mal Holland	Wilbur Klein (Nat); David Wright (Ind)
Hindmarsh	Labor	**Steve Georganas**	Rita Bouras	Tim White	Jen Williams	Richard Bunting	Clinton Duncan (Ind); Heidi Robins (WWW); James Warry (LDP)
Kingston	Liberal	Amanda Rishworth	**Kym Richardson**	Bill Weller	Matthew Fowler	Robert Brokenshire	Barry Becker (Ind); Alex Kusznir (Ind); Lachlan Smith (LDP)
Makin	Liberal	Tony Zappia	Bob Day	Graham Smith	Aleisha Brown	Andrew Graham	Robert Fechner (ON); Gary Vandersluis (LDP)
Mayo	Liberal	Mary Brewerton	**Alexander Downer**	Lynton Vonow	Andrew Castrique	Trish Nolan	Rachael Barons (CCE)
Port Adelaide	Labor	Mark Butler	Brenton Chomel	Colin Thomas	Pam Moore	Bruce Hambour	
Sturt	Liberal	Mia Handshin	**Christopher Pyne**	Sally Reid	Paul Rowse	Carol Jansen	Felicity Tilbrook (LDP)
Wakefield	Liberal	Nick Champion	**David Fawcett**	Terry Allen	Felicity Martin	Bruce Nairn	Pauline Edmunds (WWW); Peter Fitzpatrick (ON); Martin Walsh (LDP)

=== Tasmania ===
Electorate	Held by	Labor	Liberal	Greens	Family First	Other
Bass	Liberal	Jodie Campbell	**Michael Ferguson**	Tom Millen	Ixa De Haan	Shem Bennett (LDP); Adrian Watts (CEC); Sven Wiener (Ind)
Braddon	Liberal	Sid Sidebottom	**Mark Baker**	Paul O'Halloran	Wayne De Bomford	Peter Cunningham (LDP); Stephen Dick (CEC)
Denison	Labor	**Duncan Kerr**	Leigh Gray	Helen Hutchinson	Robyn Munro	Susan Austin (SA); Rob Larner (CEC)
Franklin	Labor	Julie Collins	Vanessa Goodwin	Gerard Velnaar	Gino Papiccio	Matt Holloway (SA); Roger Honey (CEC)
Lyons	Labor	**Dick Adams**	Geoff Page	Karen Cassidy	Amy Parsons	Ben Quin (Ind); Ray Williams (CEC)

=== Victoria ===
Electorate	Held by	Labor	Coalition	Greens	Democrats	Family First	Other
Aston	Liberal	Gerry Raleigh	**Chris Pearce** (Lib)	Adam Pepper	Rachal Aza	Peter Lake	Doug Mitchell (CEC)
Ballarat	Labor	**Catherine King**	Samantha McIntosh (Lib)	Belinda Coates		Dale Butterfield	
Batman	Labor	**Martin Ferguson**	Jonathan Peart (Lib)	Patricia Carey	Darren Hassan	Peter Kerin	Robert Barwick (CEC)
Bendigo	Labor	**Steve Gibbons**	Peter Kennedy (Lib)	Toby Byrne	Edward Guymer	Terry Jarvis	Peter Consandine (Ind); Clinton Gale (LDP); Eril Rathjen (Ind); Adam Veitch (Ind)
Bruce	Labor	**Alan Griffin**	Angela Randall (Lib)	Rob Cassidy	Richard Grossi	Bronwyn Rawlins	Sandra Herrmann (CDP); Neil Smith (ON)
Calwell	Labor	**Maria Vamvakinou**	Dianne Livett (Lib)	Brook Shaune	Vanessa Musolino	Arthur Buller	Philip Cutler (Ind); Frank Gaglioti (SEP); Don Hampshire (Ind); Sleiman Yohanna (CEC)
Casey	Liberal	Dympna Beard	**Tony Smith** (Lib)	Salore Craig	Tony Inglese	Daniel Harrison	George Moran (CDP)
Chisholm	Labor	**Anna Burke**	Myles King (Lib)	Alistair McCaskill	Daniel Berk	Gary Ong	Lars Thrystrup (CEC)
Corangamite	Liberal	Darren Cheeseman	**Stewart McArthur** (Lib)	Fiona Nelson	Gabrielle Killeen	Jan Edwards	Sukrit Sabhlok (LDP)
Corio	Labor	Richard Marles	Angelo Kakouros (Lib)	Rob Leach	Erica Menheere-Thompson	Gordon Alderson	Chris Johnston (SA); **Gavan O'Connor** (Ind); Ross Russell (CEC); Darrin Welden (LDP)
Deakin	Liberal	Mike Symon	**Phil Barresi** (Lib)	Bill Pemberton	Paula Nicholson	Fiona Bronte	Nick Stevenson (LDP)
Dunkley	Liberal	Graham McBride	**Bruce Billson** (Lib)	Neale Adams	Karen Bailey	Steven Ashdown	
Flinders	Liberal	Gary March	**Greg Hunt** (Lib)	Bob Brown	David Batten	Cameron Eastman	
Gellibrand	Labor	**Nicola Roxon**	Wayne Tseng (Lib)	Robert Gibson	Rachel Richards	Mukesh Garg	Ben Courtice (SA); Rod Doel (CEC); Dave O'Neil (Ind)
Gippsland	National	Jane Rowe	**Peter McGauran** (Nat)	Jeff Wrathall		Michael Rowell	Ben Buckley (Ind); Helen McAdam (WWW)
Goldstein	Liberal	Julia Mason	**Andrew Robb** (Lib)	Neil Pilling	Michael Bailey	Joyce Khoo	Colin Horne (CEC)
Gorton	Labor	**Brendan O'Connor**	Susan Jennison (Lib)	Huong Truong		Scott Amberley	Vern Hughes (DLP)
Higgins	Liberal	Barbara Norman	**Peter Costello** (Lib)	Michael Wilbur-Ham	Mary Dettman	Penny Badwal	Genevieve Forde (Ind); Stephen Mayne (Ind); Graeme Meddings (Ind)
Holt	Labor	**Anthony Byrne**	Emanuele Cicchiello (Lib)	Lynette Keleher	Ken Seymour	Yasmin De Zilwa	Chris Morgan (CEC)
Hotham	Labor	**Simon Crean**	Vince Arborea (Lib)	Matthew Billman	Craig Cadby	Peter Dorian	Terry Farrell (DLP); Mike Woodward (CEC)
Indi	Liberal	Zuvele Leschen	**Sophie Mirabella** (Lib)	Helen Robinson	Sarah Benson	Jim Rainey	Jeremy Beck (CEC)
Isaacs	Labor	Mark Dreyfus	Ross Fox (Lib)	Colin Long	Laura Chipp	Jadah Pleiter	Gordon Ford (Ind); Robert Norrie (LDP)
Jagajaga	Labor	**Jenny Macklin**	Conrad D'Souza (Lib)	Lisa Hodgson	Jason Graham	Andrew Conlon	Stephen Lele (CEC)
Kooyong	Liberal	Ken Harvey	**Petro Georgiou** (Lib)	Peter Campbell	David Collyer	John Laidler	Pierre Curtis (CEC)
Lalor	Labor	**Julia Gillard**	Peter Curtis (Lib)	Jay Tilley	Roger Howe	Steve Gleeson	Libby Krepp (DLP)
La Trobe	Liberal	Rodney Cocks	**Jason Wood** (Lib)	Bree Taylor	Craig Beale	Jim Zubic	Kurt Beilharz (CEC); Surome Singh (LDP)
Mallee	National	John Zigouras	**John Forrest** (Nat)	Liam Farrelly	Vicki McLeod	Glenn Coulthard	Chris Lahy (CEC)
Maribyrnong	Labor	Bill Shorten	Ian Soylemez (Lib)	Bob Muntz	Robert Livesay	Ian Keeling	Andre Kozlowski (CEC)
McEwen	Liberal	Rob Mitchell	**Fran Bailey** (Lib)	Steve Meacher	David Kane	Ian Cranson	Rod McLennan (CEC); Robert Newnham (LDP); Darren Trueman (Ind)
McMillan	Liberal	Christine Maxfield	**Russell Broadbent** (Lib)	Sandra Betts	Don Walters	Terry Aeschlimann	Theo Alblas (CEC); Suryan Chandrasegaran (DLP); Ben Fiechtner (LDP)
Melbourne	Labor	**Lindsay Tanner**	Andrea Del Ciotto (Lib)	Adam Bandt	Tim Wright	Georgia Pearson	Will Marshall (SEP); Kylie McGregor (-); Andrew Reed (CEC)
Melbourne Ports	Labor	**Michael Danby**	Adam Held (Lib)	Phillip Walker	John Mathieson	Rebecca Gebbing	Aaron Isherwood (CEC)
Menzies	Liberal	Andrew Campbell	**Kevin Andrews** (Lib)	David Ellis	Damien Wise	Ken Smithies	Philip Nitschke (Ind)
Murray	Liberal	Bob Scates	**Sharman Stone** (Lib)	Ian Christoe	Sarina Isgro	Serena Moore	Rob Bryant (Ind); Jeff Davy (CEC); Paul Merrigan (Ind); Diane Teasdale (Ind)
Scullin	Labor	**Harry Jenkins**	Charles Williams (Lib)	Linda Laos	Peter Hude	Tania Byers	Simon Steer (CEC)
Wannon	Liberal	Antony Moore	**David Hawker** (Lib)	Lisa Owen		Daniel Pech	
Wills	Labor	**Kelvin Thomson**	Claude Tomisich (Lib)	Dave Collis	Edward Clarke	Ihab Kelada	Zane Alcorn (SA); Craig Isherwood (CEC)

=== Western Australia ===
Electorate	Held by	Labor	Liberal	Greens	Family First	CDP	Other
Brand	Labor	Gary Gray	Phil Edman	Dawn Jecks	Andrew Newhouse	Brent Tremain	Huw Grossmith (LDP); Robin Scott (ON); Rob Totten (CEC)
Canning	Liberal	John Hughes	**Don Randall**	Denise Hardie	Rodney Grasso	Kevin Swarts	Brian Deane (ON); Brian McCarthy (CEC)
Cowan	Labor	Liz Prime	Luke Simpkins	Johannes Hermann	Rhonda Hamersley	Martin Firth	Roger Blakeway (CEC); Ken Lee (LDP); Norm Ramsey (Ind); Dave Tierney (ON)
Curtin	Liberal	Peter Grant	**Julie Bishop**	Lee Hemsley	Bev Custers	Gail Forder	Albert Caine (ON); Shahar Helel (Ind)
Forrest	Liberal	Peter MacFarlane	Nola Marino	Kingsley Gibson	Leighton Knoll	John Lewis	Noel Brunning (Ind); Ian Tuffnell (CEC); Jodie Yardley (ON)
Fremantle	Labor	Melissa Parke	John Jamieson	Steve Walker	Andriette du Plessis	Bill Heggers	Sue Bateman (ON); Paul Ellison (CEC); Sam Wainwright (SA)
Hasluck	Liberal	Sharryn Jackson	**Stuart Henry**	Jane Bremmer	Steve Bolt	Rob Merrells	Siou Hong Chia (LDP); Bill Gaugg (ON); Neil Vincent (CEC)
Kalgoorlie	Liberal	Sharon Thiel	**Barry Haase**	Robin Chapple	Ian Rose	Ross Patterson	Ian Burt (CEC); Charles Dalton (LDP); Derek Major (ON)
Moore	Liberal	Geraldine Burgess	**Mal Washer**	Annette Pericic-Herrmann	Douglas Croker	Lachlan Dunjey	George Gault (ON); Jack Harvey (CEC)
O'Connor	Liberal	Dominic Rose	**Wilson Tuckey**	Adrian Price	Stephen Larson	Mac Forsyth	Darius Crowe (Ind); Philip Gardiner (Nat); George Giudice (Ind); Judy Sudholz (CEC); Ross Paravacini (ON); Michael Walton (Ind)
Pearce	Liberal	Christopher Myson	**Judi Moylan**	Yvonne Dols	David Bolt	Paul Mewhor	Steve Branwhite (Ind); David Gunnyon (ON); Ron McLean (CEC); Annolies Truman (SA)
Perth	Labor	**Stephen Smith**	Daniel Nikolic	Damian Douglas-Meyer	Sharon Fairfull	Paul Connelly	Stephen Brooks (Ind); Marie Edmonds (ON); Orm Girvan (CEC); Chris Latham (SA)
Stirling	Liberal	Peter Tinley	**Michael Keenan**	Tamara Desiatov	Symia Hopkinson	Ray Moran	Keith Hallam (CEC); Denise Hynd (WWW); Alex Patrick (ON); Sam Ward (LDP)
Swan	Labor	**Kim Wilkie**	Steve Irons	Kim Lisson	Damon Fowler	Tasman Gilbert	Mark Dixon (LDP); Norman Gay (CEC); Joy Harris (ON); Joe Lopez (SEP); Linda Ross (Ind)
Tangney	Liberal	Mark Reynolds	**Dennis Jensen**	Christine Ivan	Lisa Saladine	Ka-ren Chew	Lloyd Boon (ON); Katherine Jackson (Ind)

== Senate ==
Sitting senators are shown in bold text. Tickets that elected at least one Senator are highlighted in the relevant colour. Successful candidates are identified by an asterisk (*).

=== Australian Capital Territory ===
Two Senate places were up for election. The Labor Party was defending one seat. The Liberal Party was defending one seat.

Labor	Liberal	Greens	Democrats	LDP
1. **Kate Lundy***; 2. Peter Conway	1. **Gary Humphries***; 2. Jacqui Myers	1. Kerrie Tucker; 2. Elena Kirschbaum	1. Norvan Vogt; 2. Anthony David	1. Lisa Milat; 2. Chris Textor
What Women Want	Climate Change	Nuclear Disarmament		
1. Emma Davidson; 2. Shannon Morris	1. Michael Fullam-Stone; 2. Andrew Gee	1. Michael Denborough; 2. Erica Denborough		

=== New South Wales ===
Six Senate places were up for election. The Labor Party was defending two seats. The Liberal-National Coalition was defending three seats. The Australian Greens were defending one seat. Senators John Faulkner (Labor), Concetta Fierravanti-Wells (Liberal), Michael Forshaw (Labor), Bill Heffernan (Liberal), Steve Hutchins (Labor) and Fiona Nash (National) were not up for re-election.

Labor	Coalition	Greens	Democrats	Family First
1. Mark Arbib*; 2. Doug Cameron*; 3. **Ursula Stephens***; 4. Pierre Esber; 5. Fiona Seaton; 6. Pauline James	1. **Helen Coonan*** (Lib); 2. John Williams* (Nat); 3. **Marise Payne*** (Lib); 4. Murray Lees (Nat); 5. Vicky McGahey (Lib); 6. Carolyn Currie (Lib)	1. **Kerry Nettle**; 2. David Shoebridge; 3. Marcia Ella-Duncan; 4. Jack Mundey; 5. Christina Ho; 6. Sandra Heilpern	1. Lyn Shumack; 2. David King; 3. Brett Paterson	1. Andrew Markwell; 2. Kathy Grey
One Nation	Christian Democrats	CEC	LDP	Climate Change
1. Judith Newson; 2. Andrew Webber; 3. Peter Bussa; 4. Andy Frew	1. Paul Green; 2. Elaine Nile; 3. Allen Lotfizadeh; 4. Peter Pilt; 5. Bruce York	1. Ann Lawler; 2. Ian McCaffrey	1. Terje Petersen; 2. Janos Beregszaszi	1. Patrice Newell; 2. Karl Kruszelnicki
DLP	Socialist Alliance	What Women Want	Carers Alliance	Hear Our Voice
1. Michael O'Donohue; 2. Terence O'Donohue	1. Alex Bainbridge; 2. Susan Price; 3. Kamala Emanuel; 4. Tim Dobson	1. Justine Caines; 2. Jan Robinson	1. Marylou Carter; 2. Nell Brown; 3. Katrina Clark; 4. Mary Mockler	1. Toni McLennan; 2. Lindsay Carroll
Pauline's UAP	CCE	Fishing Party	Non-Custodial Parents	Shooters/AFLP
1. Brian Burston; 2. John Carter	1. Richard McNeall; 2. James Maxfield	1. Garth Bridge; 2. Stewart Paterson	1. John Geremin; 2. Roland Foster	1. Robert Borsak (ASP); 2. Robert Shaw (ASP); 3. Jim Muirhead (ASP); 4. Andrew Hestelow (AFLP); 5. Thomas Morgan (AFLP)
Socialist Equality	Senator On-Line	Group J	Group P	Group V
1. Nick Beams; 2. Carol Divjak	1. Pat Reilly; 2. Berge Der Sarkissian	1. Ian Bryce; 2. John August	1. Klaas Woldring; 2. Max Bradley	1. Walter Tinyow; 2. Maria Chan
Ungrouped				
Curtis Levy; Paula Nadas; Silvana Nero; Jennifer Stefanac				

=== Northern Territory ===
Two Senate places were up for election. The Labor Party was defending one seat. The Country Liberal Party was defending one seat.

Labor	Country Liberal	Greens	CEC	Democrats	Ungrouped
1. **Trish Crossin***; 2. Kim Hill	1. **Nigel Scullion***; 2. Bernadette Wallace	1. Alan Tyley; 2. Gregory Goodluck	1. Peter Flynn; 2. Vern Work	1. Duncan Dean; 2. Joe Faggion	Bernardine Atkinson

=== Queensland ===
Six Senate places were up for election. The Labor Party was defending two seats. The Liberal-National Coalition was defending three seats. The Australian Democrats were defending one seat. Senators George Brandis (Liberal), Barnaby Joyce (National), Joe Ludwig (Labor), Brett Mason (Liberal), Jan McLucas (Labor) and Russell Trood (Liberal) were not up for re-election.

Labor	Coalition	Greens	Democrats	Family First
1. **John Hogg***; 2. **Claire Moore***; 3. Mark Furner*; 4. Diana O'Brien	1. **Ian Macdonald*** (Lib); 2. **Sue Boyce*** (Lib); 3. **Ron Boswell*** (Nat); 4. Mark Powell (Lib); 5. David Goodwin (Nat); 6. Scott Buchholz (Nat)	1. Larissa Waters; 2. Anja Light; 3. Darryl Rosin	1. **Andrew Bartlett**; 2. Sharon Neill	1. Jeff Buchanan; 2. Beryl Spencer; 3. Merlin Manners; 4. Cathy Eaton; 5. Shaun Hart; 6. Elizabeth Benson-Stott
Pauline's UAP	One Nation	CEC	LDP	Climate Change
1. Pauline Hanson; 2. David Saville	1. Ian Nelson; 2. Lew Arroita	1. Jan Pukallus; 2. Maurice Hetherington	1. John Humphreys; 2. Joseph Clark	1. Phil Johnson; 2. Steve Posselt
What Women Want	Carers Alliance	Fishing Party	Shooters	DLP
1. Anne Bousfield; 2. Sonya Beutel	1. Felicity Maddison; 2. Robert Gow	1. Bob Smith; 2. Elizabeth Stocker	1. Paul Feeney; 2. Allen Hrstich	1. Noel Jackson; 2. Brian Dowling
Christian Democrats	Socialist Alliance	Non-Custodial Parents	Fishing and Lifestyle	Senator On-Line
1. Linda Brice; 2. Malcolm Brice	1. Sam Watson; 2. Amelia Taylor	1. Bill Healey; 2. Doug Thompson	1. Kevin Collins; 2. Dave Donald	1. Ben Peake; 2. Sharon Bateson
Group K	Group N	Group W	Group X	Ungrouped
1. Richard Hackett-Jones; 2. John Rivett	1. David Couper; 2. Michael Brown	1. Katrina Alberts; 2. Martin Rady	1. James Baker; 2. Louise Fitzgerald-Baker	John Duggan; Pilly Low; James Reid; Marsileo Traversari; Leo DeMarchi; Robin Petersen

=== South Australia ===
Six Senate places were up for election. The Labor Party was defending two seats. The Liberal Party was defending three seats. The Australian Democrats were defending one seat. Senators Alan Ferguson (Liberal), Mary Jo Fisher (Liberal), Annette Hurley (Labor), Anne McEwen (Labor), Nick Minchin (Liberal) and Dana Wortley (Labor) were not up for re-election.

Labor	Liberal	National	Greens	Democrats
1. Don Farrell*; 2. **Penny Wong***; 3. Cath Perry	1. **Cory Bernardi***; 2. **Simon Birmingham***; 3. **Grant Chapman**; 4. Maria Kourtesis	1. Rob Howard; 2. Mark Cuthbertson	1. Sarah Hanson-Young*; 2. Nikki Mortier; 3. Matt Rigney	1. Ruth Russell; 2. Max Baumann; 3. Richard Way
Family First	Xenophon	One Nation	Christian Democrats	DLP
1. Tony Bates; 2. Toni Turnbull; 3. Colin Gibson	1. Nick Xenophon*; 2. Roger Bryson	1. Mark Aldridge; 2. David Dwyer	1. Bruno Colangelo; 2. Noelene Hunt	1. Garry Hardy; 2. David McCabe
CEC	LDP	Climate Change	What Women Want	Socialist Alliance
1. Martin Vincent; 2. Paul Siebert	1. David McAlary; 2. Mark Hill	1. Colin Endean; 2. Vidas Kubilius	1. Emma Neumann; 2. Morag McIntosh	1. Renfrey Clarke; 2. Liah Lazarou
Senator On-Line	Shooters	Fishing and Lifestyle	Group B	Ungrouped
1. Joel Michael Clark; 2. Courtney Clarke	1. John Hahn; 2. Basil Borun	1. Neil Armstrong; 2. Paul Tippins	1. Brian Paterson; 2. A. Brook	Michelle Drummond; Stewart Glass

=== Tasmania ===
Six Senate places were up for election. The Labor Party was defending two seats. The Liberal Party was defending three seats. The Australian Greens were defending one seat. Senators Eric Abetz (Liberal), Guy Barnett (Liberal), Christine Milne (Greens), Kerry O'Brien (Labor), Stephen Parry (Liberal) and Helen Polley (Labor) were not up for re-election.

Labor	Liberal	Greens	Family First	DLP
1. **Nick Sherry***; 2. **Carol Brown***; 3. Catryna Bilyk*	1. **Richard Colbeck***; 2. **David Bushby***; 3. Don Morris	1. **Bob Brown***; 2. Andrew Wilkie; 3. Sophie Houghton; 4. Scott Jordan	1. Jacquie Petrusma; 2. Andrew Bennett; 3. Betty Roberts	1. Pat Crea; 2. Joan Shackcloth
LDP	CEC	What Women Want	Group C	Group G
1. Bede Ireland; 2. Luke Hamilton	1. Caroline Larner; 2. Michael Phibbs	1. Debra Cashion; 2. Belinda Gleeson	1. Steve Martin; 2. Karley Nelson	1. Dino Ottavi; 2. Mick Cook; 3. Chris Smallbane
Group H				
1. Robyn Doyle; 2. David Hammond				

=== Victoria ===
Six Senate places were up for election. The Labor Party was defending two seats. The Liberal-National Coalition was defending three seats. The Australian Democrats were defending one seat. Senators Kim Carr (Labor), Stephen Conroy (Labor), Steve Fielding (Family First), Julian McGauran (Liberal), Michael Ronaldson (Liberal) and Judith Troeth (Liberal) were not up for re-election.

Labor	Coalition	Greens	Democrats	Family First
1. Jacinta Collins*; 2. **Gavin Marshall***; 3. David Feeney*; 4. Marg Lewis	1. **Mitch Fifield*** (Lib); 2. Helen Kroger* (Lib); 3. Scott Ryan* (Lib); 4. Simon Swayn (Nat)	1. Richard Di Natale; 2. Jenny O'Connor; 3. Alex Bhathal; 4. Jim Reiher; 5. Hoa Pham; 6. Emma Henley	1. **Lyn Allison**; 2. Greg Chipp; 3. Jo McCubbin	1. Gary Plumridge; 2. Miriam Rawson; 3. Monique Podbury; 4. Chris Willis; 5. Clare Heath; 6. Ann Bown Seeley
One Nation	CEC	LDP	Socialist Alliance	What Women Want
1. Nick Steel; 2. Daniel Shore	1. Rachel Affleck; 2. Katherine Isherwood	1. Steve Clancy; 2. Geoff Saw	1. Margarita Windisch; 2. Jeremy Smith	1. Madeleine Love; 2. Robyn Thompson
Carers Alliance	Climate Change	CCE	DLP	Christian Democrats
1. Junelle Rhodes; 2. Peter Gibilisco; 3. Patricia Karadimos	1. Ainslie Howard; 2. Sashikala Rozairo	1. Steve Raskovy; 2. Viesha Lewand	1. John Mulholland; 2. Gerry Flood; 3. Pat La Manna; 4. Teresa Evelyn-Liardet; 5. Ken Wells; 6. Paul Crea	1. Ewan McDonald; 2. Dallas Clarnette
Shooters	Socialist Equality	Non-Custodial Parents	Senator On-Line	Group I
1. Brett Parker; 2. Matt Graham	1. Peter Byrne; 2. Tania Baptist	1. Brendan Hall; 2. John Zabaneh	1. Robert Rose; 2. Jenny Barrett	1. Joseph Toscano; 2. Jude Pierce
Group P	Group T	Group V	Ungrouped	
1. John Perkins; 2. Andrew Conway	1. Joseph Kaliniy; 2. Koulla Mesaritis	1. Tony Klein; 2. Amanda Klein	Norman Walker (Ind); Darryl O'Brien (Ind); Llewellyn Groves (ON WA); Tejay Sener (Ind)	

=== Western Australia ===
Six Senate places were up for election. The Labor Party was defending two seats. The Liberal Party was defending three seats. The Australian Democrats were defending one seat. Senators Judith Adams (Liberal), Mathias Cormann (Liberal), Chris Ellison (Liberal), Chris Evans (Labor), Rachel Siewert (Greens) and Glenn Sterle (Labor) were not up for re-election.

Labor	Liberal	National	Greens	Democrats
1. Louise Pratt*; 2. **Mark Bishop***; 3. **Ruth Webber**	1. **David Johnston***; 2. **Alan Eggleston***; 3. Michaelia Cash*; 4. Michael Mischin; 5. Jane Mouritz; 6. Matt Brown	1. Tony Crook; 2. Wendy Duncan	1. Scott Ludlam*; 2. Alison Xamon; 3. Brenda Roy	1. Erica Lewin; 2. Rob Olver; 3. Don Hoddy
Family First	Christian Democrats	CEC	LDP	Climate Change
1. Linda Rose; 2. Cathie Fabian; 3. Steve Fuhrmann	1. Gerard Goiran; 2. Peter Watt	1. Jean Robinson; 2. Stuart Smith	1. Peter Whelan; 2. Daniel Parker	1. Gary Warden; 2. Sarah Bishop
What Women Want	Carers Alliance	Socialist Equality	CCE	DLP
1. Meryki Basden; 2. Saywood Lane	1. Thomas Hoyer; 2. Shirley Primeau	1. Trent Hawkins; 2. Julie Gray	1. Gerard Kettle; 2. Shirley Anton	1. Bob Boulger; 2. Eric Miller
One Nation	Non-Custodial Parents	Senator On-Line	Group M	Group P
1. James Hopkinson; 2. Ron McLean	1. Geoff Dixon; 2. Mike Ward	1. Daniel Mayer; 2. Zoe Lamont	1. Eric Wynne; 2. Kevin Fitzgerald	1. Graeme Campbell; 2. John Fischer; 3. Russell Graham; 4. Geoff Gibson
Group Q	Ungrouped			
1. Jennifer Armstrong; 2. Michael Tan	Richard McNaught; Edward Dabrowski			

== Summary by party ==
Below is a comprehensive list of registered parties contesting the elections for the House of Representatives and the Senate. Beside each party is the number of seats contested by that party in the House of Representatives for each state, as well as an indication of whether the party contested the Senate election in the respective state.

Party	NSW		Vic		Qld		WA		SA		Tas		ACT		NT		Total	
Party	HR	S	HR	S	HR	S	HR	S	HR	S	HR	S	HR	S	HR	S	HR	S
Australian Labor Party	49¹	*	37	*	29	*	15	*	11	*	5	*	2	*	2	*	150	8
Liberal Party of Australia	40	*	35	*	24	*	15	*	11	*	5	*	2	*			132	7
National Party of Australia	9	*	2	*	10	*	1	*	2	*							24	5
Country Liberal Party															2	*	2	1
Australian Greens	49	*	37	*	29	*	15	*	11	*	5	*	2	*	2	*	150	8
Family First Party	32	*	37	*	29	*	15	*	11	*	5	*					129	6
Australian Democrats	12	*	33	*	29	*		*	11	*			1	*		*	86	7
Citizens Electoral Council	24	*	22	*	14	*	13	*		*	5	*	2		1	*	81	7
Christian Democratic Party	44	*	2	*	2	*	15	*		*							63	5
Liberty and Democracy Party	12	*	8	*	12	*	6	*	6	*	2	*		*	1		47	7
One Nation	8	*	1	*	8²	*²	15²	*²	3	*							35	5
Socialist Alliance	5	*	3	*	3	*	3	*		*	2		1				17	5
Socialist Equality Party	6	*	2	*			1										9	2
Climate Change Coalition	7	*		*		*		*		*				*			7	6
What Women Want		*	1	*		*	1	*	2	*		*		*			4	7
Democratic Labor Party		*	4	*		*		*		*		*					4	6
Conservatives for Climate and Environment	3	*		*				*	1								4	3
Non-Custodial Parents Party	2	*		*		*		*									2	4
Fishing Party	1	*			1	*											2	2
Senator On-Line		*		*		*		*		*								5
Carers Alliance		*		*		*		*										4
Shooters Party		*³		*		*				*								4
Australian Fishing and Lifestyle Party		*³				*				*								3
Pauline's United Australia Party		*				*												2
Hear Our Voice		*																1
Nuclear Disarmament Party														*				1
Independent and other	41		18		26		10		5		2		1		3		106	

¹Includes 5 New South Wales seats contested as "Country Labor"
²Contested as "One Nation WA" in Queensland and Western Australia
³Shooters Party and AFLP contested a joint ticket in New South Wales

== Unregistered parties and groups ==
Some parties and groups that did not qualify for registration with the Australian Electoral Commission nevertheless endorsed candidates, who appeared on the ballot papers as independent or unaffiliated candidates.

- The Secular Party of Australia ran Senate tickets in all states: Group J in New South Wales, Group P in Victoria, Group W in Queensland, Group Q in Western Australia, Group B in South Australia and Group H in Tasmania.
- The Socialist Party endorsed Kylie McGregor in Melbourne.
- The Communist League endorsed Alasdair Macdonald in Parramatta and Ronald Poulsen in Watson.
- "Abolish State Governments" endorsed Group P for the Senate in New South Wales.
- FreeMatilda endorsed Group K for the Senate in Queensland.

== Former candidates ==
The following preselected candidates either voluntarily withdrew their candidacy or were disendorsed by a party.

=== Labor ===
- Jennifer Algie: original preselected candidate for the newly created seat of Flynn (Qld). Algie withdrew in February 2007.
- John Fitzroy: original preselected candidate for National held Cowper (NSW). Labor re-opened nominations for the seat in September 2007 to choose a superior candidate, after polling showed the seat more winnable than previously thought.
- Shane Guley: original preselected candidate for National held Maranoa (Qld). Guley withdrew in October 2007 after allegations of assault and intimidation became public.
- Kevin Harkins: original preselected candidate for Labor held Franklin (Tas). Harkins withdrew in August 2007, facing charges of illegal strike action.
- Greg Pargeter: original preselected candidate for Liberal held La Trobe (Vic). Pargeter was dropped to make way for another candidate in August 2007.
- Steve Reissig: original preselected candidate for Liberal held Bass (Tas). Reissig withdrew in October 2006.
- Bruce Simmonds: original preselected candidate for Liberal held McPherson (Qld). Simmonds withdrew in February 2007 after his company was accused of "acting dishonestly".

=== Liberal ===
- Ken Aldred: original preselected candidate for Labor held Holt (Vic). Aldred, a former federal Liberal MP from 1975 to 1980 and 1983 to 1996, won the branch-level ballot to be the party's nominee. However, Aldred's preselection proved to be controversial due to his history of using parliamentary privilege to air spurious allegations against prominent community figures. His preselection was not ratified by Administrative Committee of the Liberal Party in Victoria.
- Mathew Brown: original preselected candidate for Liberal held Tangney (WA). Brown defeated sitting Liberal MP Dennis Jensen in a branch-level vote. But in October 2006, the party's state council overturned this result and endorsed Jensen instead. Brown was subsequently preselected for the unwinnable sixth spot on the party's Senate (WA) ticket.
- Steve Coltman: original preselected candidate for Labor held Ballarat (Vic). Coltman withdrew in February 2007.
- Hamish Jones: original preselected candidate for Labor held Maribyrnong (Vic). Jones was deselected in August 2007 following revelations he'd used his blog site to air derogatory personal attacks against several politicians.
- Paul McLoughlin: original preselected candidate for Labor held Calwell (Vic). McLoughlin stood down in October 2007.
- Cam Nation: original preselected candidate for Labor held Gorton (Vic). Nation was replaced as a candidate in September 2007.
- Ben Quin: preselected candidate for Labor held Lyons (Tas). Quin tendered his resignation from the Liberal party because of his opposition to the controversial Tamar Valley pulp mill project in northern Tasmania. Instead, Quin ran as an independent candidate.
- Philippa Reid: original preselected candidate for Liberal held Forrest (WA). Reid withdrew in November 2006 following revelations that she was called before an anti-corruption inquiry.
- Michael Towke: original preselected candidate for Liberal held Cook (NSW). Towke's candidacy was overturned by the NSW Liberal Party state execute following allegations of branch stacking.

=== Family First ===
- Renee Sciberras: preselected candidate for the Labor held Prospect (NSW). She was deselected as the candidate after revealing photographs posted on her Facebook page were leaked to the media.
- Andrew Quah: original preselected candidate for the Labor held Prospect (NSW), then for the Labor held Parramatta (NSW). Quah was expelled from the party after nude photos of himself appeared on gay websites around Australia. Quah claimed the photos were composites digitally altered in Photoshop.

== See also ==
- 2007 Australian federal election
- Members of the Australian House of Representatives, 2004–2007
- Members of the Australian Senate, 2005–2008
- List of political parties in Australia
