= Electoral results for the district of Ferny Grove =

Queensland, Australia, district election results

This is a list of electoral results for the electoral district of Ferny Grove in Queensland state elections.

== Members for Ferny Grove ==
Member	Party	Term
Glen Milliner	Labor	1992–1998
Geoff Wilson	Labor	1998–2012
Dale Shuttleworth	Liberal National	2012–2015
Mark Furner	Labor	2015–present

== Election results ==
=== Elections in the 2020s ===
2024 Queensland state election: Ferny Grove
Party	Candidate	Votes	%	±%
Labor	Mark Furner	13,631	39.78	−5.32
Liberal National	Nelson Savanh	12,290	35.87	+2.73
Greens	Elizabeth McAulay	6,679	19.49	+4.30
One Nation	Leonie Swanner	1,664	4.86	+1.90
Total formal votes		34,264	97.64	+0.26
Informal votes		828	2.36	−0.26
Turnout		35,092	92.31	+0.67
Two-party-preferred result
Labor	Mark Furner	19,834	57.89	−3.08
Liberal National	Nelson Savanh	14,430	42.11	+3.08
Labor hold		Swing	−3.08	

2020 Queensland state election: Ferny Grove
Party	Candidate	Votes	%	±%
Labor	Mark Furner	14,577	45.10	+4.57
Liberal National	Chris Lehmann	10,714	33.14	−6.92
Greens	Joel Colls	4,910	15.19	−0.33
One Nation	Elton Williams	956	2.96	+2.96
Informed Medical Options	Susan Pini	510	1.58	+1.58
Independent	Mark Scofield	467	1.44	+1.44
United Australia	John McCabe	191	0.59	+0.59
Total formal votes		32,325	97.38	+0.43
Informal votes		870	2.62	−0.43
Turnout		33,195	91.64	+1.28
Two-party-preferred result
Labor	Mark Furner	19,710	60.97	+6.34
Liberal National	Chris Lehmann	12,615	39.03	−6.34
Labor hold		Swing	+6.34	

=== Elections in the 2010s ===
2017 Queensland state election: Ferny Grove
Party	Candidate	Votes	%	±%
Labor	Mark Furner	12,590	40.5	−3.0
Liberal National	Nick Elston	12,446	40.1	−0.9
Greens	Elizabeth World	4,820	15.5	+4.3
Independent	Lisa Foo	1,208	3.9	+3.9
Total formal votes		31,064	96.9	−1.7
Informal votes		978	3.1	+1.7
Turnout		32,042	90.4	−1.0
Two-party-preferred result
Labor	Mark Furner	16,971	54.6	−0.7
Liberal National	Nick Elston	14,093	45.4	+0.7
Labor hold		Swing	−0.7	

2015 Queensland state election: Ferny Grove
Party	Candidate	Votes	%	±%
Liberal National	Dale Shuttleworth	13,214	44.59	−9.77
Labor	Mark Furner	11,253	37.97	+6.57
Greens	Michael Berkman	3,589	12.11	−2.14
Palmer United	Mark Taverner	993	3.35	+3.35
Independent	Di Gittins	588	1.98	+1.98
Total formal votes		29,637	98.47	+0.21
Informal votes		459	1.53	−0.21
Turnout		30,096	92.66	−1.39
Two-party-preferred result
Labor	Mark Furner	14,445	50.82	+10.34
Liberal National	Dale Shuttleworth	13,979	49.18	−10.34
Labor gain from Liberal National		Swing	+10.34	

2012 Queensland state election: Ferny Grove
Party	Candidate	Votes	%	±%
Liberal National	Dale Shuttleworth	15,458	54.36	+15.07
Labor	Geoff Wilson	8,929	31.40	−12.86
Greens	Howard Nielsen	4,051	14.25	+0.30
Total formal votes		28,438	98.27	−0.31
Informal votes		501	1.73	+0.31
Turnout		28,939	94.05	+0.94
Two-party-preferred result
Liberal National	Dale Shuttleworth	16,062	59.52	+14.01
Labor	Geoff Wilson	10,922	40.48	−14.01
Liberal National gain from Labor		Swing	+14.01	

=== Elections in the 2000s ===
2009 Queensland state election: Ferny Grove
Party	Candidate	Votes	%	±%
Labor	Geoff Wilson	12,325	44.3	−7.1
Liberal National	Dale Shuttleworth	10,941	39.3	+9.4
Greens	Howard Nielsen	3,884	13.9	+2.3
Family First	Mark White	698	2.5	−4.6
Total formal votes		27,848	98.4	
Informal votes		401	1.6	
Turnout		28,249	93.1	
Two-party-preferred result
Labor	Geoff Wilson	14,309	54.5	−7.6
Liberal National	Dale Shuttleworth	11,950	45.5	+7.6
Labor hold		Swing	−7.6	

2006 Queensland state election: Ferny Grove
Party	Candidate	Votes	%	±%
Labor	Geoff Wilson	14,378	51.4	−4.2
Liberal	James Petterson	8,347	29.9	−3.1
Greens	Di Clark	3,236	11.6	+0.3
Family First	Mark White	1,991	7.1	+7.1
Total formal votes		27,952	98.4	−0.0
Informal votes		456	1.6	+0.0
Turnout		28,408	92.5	−0.6
Two-party-preferred result
Labor	Geoff Wilson	16,256	62.1	−1.1
Liberal	James Petterson	9,932	37.9	+1.1
Labor hold		Swing	−1.1	

2004 Queensland state election: Ferny Grove
Party	Candidate	Votes	%	±%
Labor	Geoff Wilson	15,323	55.6	−7.7
Liberal	Andrew Patterson	9,093	33.0	+7.0
Greens	Di Clark	3,122	11.3	+0.6
Total formal votes		27,538	98.4	+0.7
Informal votes		448	1.6	−0.7
Turnout		27,986	93.1	−1.5
Two-party-preferred result
Labor	Geoff Wilson	16,559	63.2	−7.3
Liberal	Andrew Patterson	9,657	36.8	+7.3
Labor hold		Swing	−7.3	

2001 Queensland state election: Ferny Grove
Party	Candidate	Votes	%	±%
Labor	Geoff Wilson	16,466	63.3	+18.4
Liberal	Kel Eaton	6,756	26.0	−2.4
Greens	Mike Stasse	2,774	10.7	+6.6
Total formal votes		25,996	97.7	
Informal votes		599	2.3	
Turnout		26,595	94.6	
Two-party-preferred result
Labor	Geoff Wilson	17,488	70.5	+12.0
Liberal	Kel Eaton	7,302	29.5	−12.0
Labor hold		Swing	+12.0	

=== Elections in the 1990s ===
1998 Queensland state election: Ferny Grove
Party	Candidate	Votes	%	±%
Labor	Geoff Wilson	11,049	45.0	−0.9
Liberal	Ashley Manicaros	6,955	28.3	−12.1
One Nation	Kevin John	4,333	17.6	+17.6
Democrats	Suzanne Lawson	1,224	5.0	+5.0
Greens	Mark Taylor	989	4.0	−5.3
Total formal votes		24,550	98.8	+0.3
Informal votes		289	1.2	−0.3
Turnout		24,839	94.7	+0.8
Two-party-preferred result
Labor	Geoff Wilson	13,407	58.6	+5.3
Liberal	Ashley Manicaros	9,480	41.4	−5.3
Labor hold		Swing	+5.3	

1995 Queensland state election: Ferny Grove
Party	Candidate	Votes	%	±%
Labor	Glen Milliner	10,253	45.9	−11.8
Liberal	Reuben Morris	9,049	40.5	+22.5
Greens	Mark Taylor	2,088	9.3	+9.3
Independent	Brett Gorman	967	4.3	+4.3
Total formal votes		22,357	98.5	+0.6
Informal votes		330	1.5	−0.6
Turnout		22,687	93.9	
Two-party-preferred result
Labor	Glen Milliner	11,567	53.2	−10.6
Liberal	Reuben Morris	10,157	46.8	+10.6
Labor hold		Swing	−10.6	

1992 Queensland state election: Ferny Grove
Party	Candidate	Votes	%	±%
Labor	Glen Milliner	12,009	57.6	−1.3
Liberal	Rex Hawkes	3,752	18.0	−12.3
National	Chris Harding	3,504	16.8	+7.8
Independent	Des O'Neill	1,567	7.5	+7.5
Total formal votes		20,832	98.0	
Informal votes		430	2.0	
Turnout		21,262	93.8	
Two-party-preferred result
Labor	Glen Milliner	12,805	63.8	+3.6
Liberal	Rex Hawkes	7,253	36.2	−3.6
Labor hold		Swing	+3.6	
