= 2007 Australian Senate election =

Australian federal election results

- 24 November 2007

40 of the 76 seats in the Australian Senate 39 seats needed for a majority
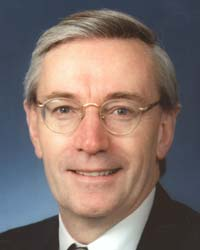

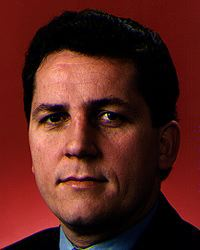

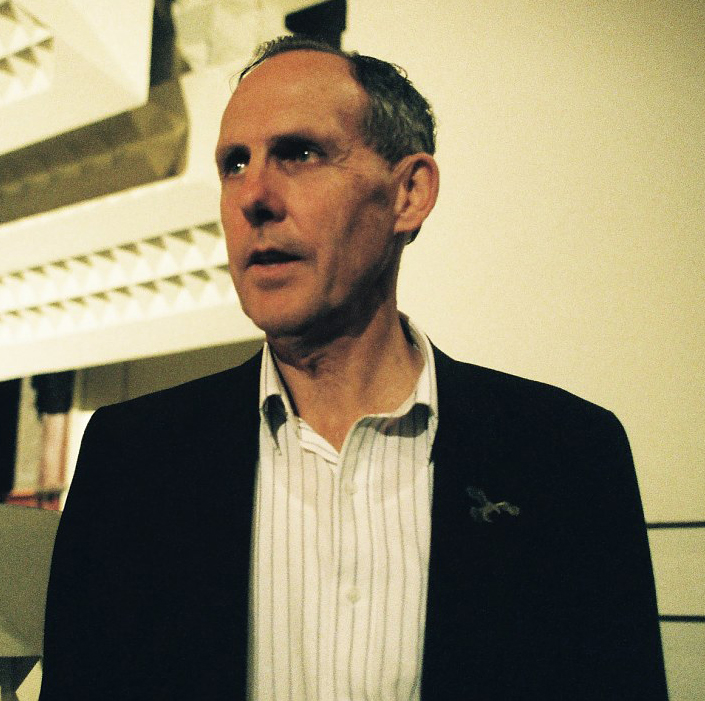
| | First party | Second party | Third party |
|---|---|---|---|
| Leader | Nick Minchin | Chris Evans | Bob Brown |
| Party | Liberal–National Coalition | Labor | Greens |
| Leader since | 27 January 2006 | 22 October 2004 | 28 November 2005 |
| Leader's seat | South Australia | Western Australia | Tasmania |
| Seats before | 39 | 28 | 4 |
| Seats won | 18 | 18 | 3 |
| Seats after | 37 | 32 | 5 |
| Seat change | ▼2 | ▲4 | ▲1 |
| Popular vote | 5,055,095 | 5,101,200 | 1,144,751 |
| Percentage | 39.94% | 40.30% | 9.04% |
| Swing | ▼5.15% | ▲5.28% | ▲1.38% |
- Senators elected in the 2007 federal election
Leader of the Senate before election
Nick Minchin
Liberal/National coalition
Elected Leader of the Senate
Chris Evans
Labor

The following tables show state-by-state results in the Australian Senate at the 2007 federal election, 37 Coalition (32 Liberal, four National, one CLP), 32 Labor, five Green, one Family First, and one independent, Nick Xenophon. Senators are elected for six-year terms, and took their seats from 1 July 2008, but senators representing the territories have three-year terms and take their seats immediately.

== Preference deals ==
Preferences played a crucial role in determining winners in both the House and Senate. Unlike the previous election, Labor and Australian Democrats directed preferences to the Australian Greens. In exchange, the Greens preferenced the Democrats and Labor. The Family First Party and Christian Democratic Party (Australia) directed preferences in most states to the Coalition. In turn, the Coalition preferenced both parties and also preferenced the Greens ahead of Labor.

== Australia ==
Senate (STV GV) — Turnout 95.17% (CV) — Informal 2.55%
| Party | Votes | % | Swing | Seats won | Seats held | Change |
|---|---|---|---|---|---|---|
| Australian Labor Party | 5,101,200 | 40.30 | +5.28 | 18 | 32 | ▲4 |
| Liberal/National Coalition | | | | | | |
| Liberal/National joint ticket (Note: The Liberal and National parties ran a joint ticket in New South Wales, Victoria and Queensland. It includes the four senators from Queensland who ran on separate tickets at the 2004 election.) | 3,883,479 | 30.68 | −3.55 | 9 | 19 | Steady |
| Liberal (Note: The Liberals-only ticket ran in Western Australia, South Australia, Tasmania and the Australian Capital Territory.) | 1,110,366 | 8.77 | −1.63 | 8 | 17 | ▼2 |
| National (Note: The Nationals-only ticket ran in Western Australia and South Australia.) | 20,997 | 0.17 | +0.06 | 0 | 0 | Steady |
| Country Liberal (Note: There are no Liberal or National parties in the Northern Territory, with the Country Liberal Party being the sole the centre-right coalition party .) | 40,253 | 0.32 | −0.03 | 1 | 1 | Steady |
| Coalition total | 5,055,095 | 39.94 | –5.15 | 18 | 37 | ▼2 |
| Greens | 1,144,751 | 9.04 | +1.38 | 3 | 5 | ▲1 |
| Family First | 204,788 | 1.62 | –0.14 | 0 | 1 | Steady |
| Democrats | 162,975 | 1.29 | –0.80 | 0 | 0 | ▼4 |
| Pauline's UAP | 141,268 | 1.12 | +1.12 | | | |
| Christian Democrats | 118,614 | 0.94 | –0.24 | | | |
| Democratic Labor Party | 115,966 | 0.92 | +0.43 | | | |
| Shooters (Note: The Shooters Party total includes the result for a joint ticket with the Australian Fishing and Lifestyle Party in New South Wales (45,932 votes).) | 84,148 | 0.66 | +0.66 | | | |
| Climate Change | 78,763 | 0.62 | +0.62 | | | |
| What Women Want | 58,803 | 0.46 | +0.46 | | | |
| One Nation | 52,708 | 0.42 | –1.31 | | | |
| Fishing Party | 47,379 | 0.37 | –0.05 | | | |
| Fishing and Lifestyle | 24,902 | 0.20 | +0.20 | | | |
| Carers Alliance | 24,393 | 0.19 | +0.19 | | | |
| Liberty & Democracy | 16,942 | 0.13 | +0.13 | | | |
| Climate Conservatives | 9,988 | 0.08 | +0.08 | | | |
| Socialist Alliance | 9,525 | 0.08 | –0.03 | | | |
| Citizens Electoral Council | 8,677 | 0.07 | –0.14 | | | |
| Senator On-Line | 8,048 | 0.06 | +0.06 | | | |
| Non-Custodial Parents | 6,385 | 0.05 | –0.05 | | | |
| Socialist Equality Party (Note: Unknown if this is the same group that would be known as Socialist Equality Party from 2010 onwards) | 4,542 | 0.04 | +0.04 | | | |
| Hear Our Voice | 2,041 | 0.02 | +0.02 | | | |
| Nuclear Disarmament Party | 446 | 0.00 | –0.02 | | | |
| Independent | 174,458 | 1.38 | –0.13 | 1 (Note: The independenant senator was Nick Xenophon (South Australia).) | 1 | ▲1 |
| Total | 12,656,805 | | | 40 | 76 | |
| Invalid/blank votes | 331,009 | 2.55 | −1.20 | | | |
| Registered voters/turnout | 13,646,539 | 95.17 | | | | |
Source: Commonwealth Election 2007

== New South Wales ==
| Elected | # | Senator | Party |
| 2007 | 1 | Mark Arbib | Labor |
| 2007 | 2 | Helen Coonan | Liberal |
| 2007 | 3 | Doug Cameron | Labor |
| 2007 | 4 | John Williams | National |
| 2007 | 5 | Marise Payne | Liberal |
| 2007 | 6 | Ursula Stephens | Labor |
2004
| 2004 | 1 | Bill Heffernan | Liberal |
| 2004 | 2 | Steve Hutchins | Labor |
| 2004 | 3 | Concetta Fierravanti-Wells | Liberal |
| 2004 | 4 | John Faulkner | Labor |
| 2004 | 5 | Fiona Nash | National |
| 2004 | 6 | Michael Forshaw | Labor |

2007 Australian federal election: Senate, New South Wales
| Party | Candidate | Votes | % | ±% |
|---|---|---|---|---|
| Quota | | 599,034 | | |
| Labor | 1. Mark Arbib (elected 1); 2. Doug Cameron (elected 3); 3. Ursula Stephens (elected 6); 4. Pierre Esber; 5. Fiona Seaton; 6. Pauline James | 1,764,040 | 42.07 | +5.70 |
| Liberal/National Coalition | 1. Helen Coonan (Lib) (elected 2); 2. John Williams (Nat) (elected 4); 3. Marise Payne (Lib) (elected 5); 4. Murray Lees (Nat); 5. Vicky McGahey (Lib); 6. Carolyn Currie (Lib) | 1,649,014 | 39.33 | −4.79 |
| Greens | 1. Kerry Nettle; 2. David Shoebridge; 3. Marcia Ella-Duncan; 4. Jack Mundey; 5. Christina Ho; 6. Sandra Heilpern | 353,286 | 8.43 | +1.09 |
| Christian Democrats | 1. Paul Green; 2. Elaine Nile; 3. Allan Lotfizadeh; 4. Peter Pilt; 5. Bruce York | 82,560 | 1.97 | −0.64 |
| Democratic Labor | 1. Michael O'Donohue; 2. Terence O'Donohue | 52,977 | 1.26 | +1.26 |
| Shooters/Fishing and Lifestyle | 1. Robert Borsak (Shooters); 2. Robert Shaw (Shooters); 3. Jim Muirhead (Shooters); 4. Andrew Hestelow (F&L); 5. Thomas Morgan (F&L) | 45,932 | 1.10 | +1.10 |
| Pauline's UAP | 1. Brian Burston; 2. John Carter | 39,807 | 0.95 | +0.95 |
| Climate Change | 1. Patrice Newell; 2. Karl Kruszelnicki | 37,271 | 0.89 | +0.89 |
| Democrats | 1. Lyn Shumack; 2. David King; 3. Brett Paterson | 37,193 | 0.89 | −1.31 |
| Fishing Party | 1. Garth Bridge; 2. Stewart Paterson | 27,089 | 0.65 | +0.11 |
| Family First | 1. Andrew Markwell; 2. Kathy Gray | 25,321 | 0.60 | +0.04 |
| One Nation | 1. Judith Newson; 2. Andrew Webber; 3. Peter Bussa; 4. Andy Frew | 17,379 | 0.41 | −1.48 |
| What Women Want | 1. Justine Caines; 2. Janette Robinson | 15,812 | 0.38 | +0.38 |
| Carers Alliance | 1. Marylou Carter; 2. Nell Brown; 3. Katrina Clark; 4. Mary Mockler | 14,099 | 0.34 | +0.34 |
| Liberty & Democracy | 1. Terje Petersen; 2. Janos Beregszaszi | 7,772 | 0.19 | +0.19 |
| Climate Conservatives | 1. Richard McNeall; 2. James Maxfield | 4,203 | 0.10 | +0.10 |
| Socialist Alliance | 1. Alex Bainbridge; 2. Susan Price; 3. Kamala Emanuel; 4. Tim Dobson | 3,351 | 0.08 | −0.03 |
| Non-Custodial Parents | 1. John Geremin; 2. Roland Foster | 2,538 | 0.06 | −0.01 |
| Senator On-Line | 1. Pat Reilly; 2. Berge Der Sarkissian | 2,257 | 0.05 | +0.05 |
| Citizens Electoral Council | 1. Ann Lawler; 2. Ian McCaffrey | 2,224 | 0.05 | −0.01 |
| Socialist Equality Party (Note: Unknown if this is the same group that would be known as Socialist Equality Party from 2010 onwards) | 1. Nick Beams; 2. Carol Divjak | 2,139 | 0.05 | +0.05 |
| Hear Our Voice | 1. Toni McLennan; 2. Lindsay Carroll | 2,041 | 0.05 | +0.05 |
| Secular | 1. Ian Bryce; 2. John August | 2,017 | 0.05 | +0.05 |
| Group V | 1. Walter Tinyow; 2. Maria Chan | 1,259 | 0.03 | +0.03 |
| Abolish State Governments | 1. Klaas Woldring; 2. Max Bradley | 948 | 0.02 | +0.02 |
| Independent | Paula Nadas | 394 | 0.01 | +0.01 |
| Independent | Jennifer Stefanac | 186 | 0.00 | +0.00 |
| Independent | Curtis Levy | 79 | 0.00 | +0.00 |
| Independent | Silvana Nero | 46 | 0.00 | +0.00 |
| Total formal votes | | 4,193,234 | 97.76 | +1.23 |
| Informal votes | | 96,210 | 2.24 | −1.23 |
| Turnout | | 4,289,444 | 95.40 | +0.29 |

Both major parties finished with around 40% of the primary vote each with Labor in front. The Greens received over 8% of the primary vote. Labor won two seats on primary vote alone, narrowly missing a third seat. The Coalition also won two seats, including one to National Party of Australia candidate John Williams. Despite finishing with less than 1% of the primary vote, the Climate Change Coalition managed to place ahead of Pauline's United Australia Party, the Democrats and Family First. The Democrats and Pauline United Australia Party directed preferences to the Climate Change Coalition. Unlike in other states, Family First also directed its preferences to the Climate Change Coalition. After these preferences, the Climate Change Coalition had increased their vote from less than 1% to almost 5%. However, they still narrowly finished behind the Christian Democrats. Preferences from the Climate Change Coalition went to the Greens however they still finished behind the major parties. This led to Greens senator Kerry Nettle losing her seat. Preferences from the Christian Democrats went to the Coalition, allowing them to win their third seat with Labor winning the remaining seat. The result was three seats each to the Coalition and Labor

== Victoria ==
| Elected | # | Senator | Party |
| 2007 | 1 | Jacinta Collins | Labor |
| 2007 | 2 | Mitch Fifield | Liberal |
| 2007 | 3 | Gavin Marshall | Labor |
| 2007 | 4 | Helen Kroger | Liberal |
| 2007 | 5 | Scott Ryan | Liberal |
| 2007 | 6 | David Feeney | Labor |
2004
| 2004 | 1 | Michael Ronaldson | Liberal |
| 2004 | 2 | Kim Carr | Labor |
| 2004 | 3 | Julian McGauran | Liberal |
| 2004 | 4 | Stephen Conroy | Labor |
| 2004 | 5 | Judith Troeth | Liberal |
| 2004 | 6 | Steve Fielding | Family First |

2007 Australian federal election: Senate, Victoria
| Party | Candidate | Votes | % | ±% |
|---|---|---|---|---|
| Quota | | 454,625 | | |
| Labor | 1. Jacinta Collins (elected 1); 2. Gavin Marshall (elected 3); 3. David Feeney (elected 6); 4. Marg Lewis | 1,327,076 | 41.70 | +5.58 |
| Liberal/National Coalition | 1. Mitch Fifield (Lib) (elected 2); 2. Helen Kroger (Lib) (elected 4); 3. Scott Ryan (Lib) (elected 5); 4. Simon Swayn (Nat) | 1,257,149 | 39.50 | −4.60 |
| Greens | 1. Richard Di Natale; 2. Jenny O'Connor; 3. Alexandra Bhathal; 4. Jim Reiher; 5. Hoa Pham; 6. Emma Henley | 320,759 | 10.08 | +1.28 |
| Family First | 1. Gary Plumridge; 2. Miriam Rawson; 3. Monique Podbury; 4. Chris Willis; 5. Clare Heath; 6. Ann Bown Seeley | 80,100 | 2.52 | +0.64 |
| Democrats | 1. Lyn Allison; 2. Greg Chipp; 3. Jo McCubbin | 52,596 | 1.65 | −0.21 |
| Democratic Labor | 1. John Mulholland; 2. Gerry Flood; 3. Pat La Manna; 4. Teresa Evelyn-Liardet; 5. Ken Wells; 6. Paul Crea | 32,930 | 1.03 | −0.91 |
| Climate Change | 1. Ainslie Howard; 2. Sashikala Rozairo | 24,759 | 0.78 | +0.78 |
| Shooters | 1. Brett Parker; 2. Matt Graham | 21,398 | 0.67 | +0.67 |
| What Women Want | 1. Madeleine Love; 2. Robyn Thompson | 14,028 | 0.44 | +0.44 |
| One Nation | 1. Nick Steel; 2. Daniel Shore | 13,354 | 0.42 | −0.30 |
| Christian Democrats | 1. Ewan McDonald; 2. Dallas Clarnette | 7,100 | 0.22 | −0.12 |
| Group I | 1. Joseph Toscano; 2. Jude Pierce | 5,695 | 0.18 | +0.18 |
| Climate Conservatives | 1. Steve Raskovy; 2. Viesha Lewand | 4,216 | 0.13 | +0.13 |
| Carers Alliance | 1. Junelle Rhodes; 2. Peter Gibilisco; 3. Patricia Karadimos | 3,901 | 0.12 | +0.12 |
| Senator On-Line | 1. Robert Rose; 2. Jeremy Barrett | 3,106 | 0.10 | +0.10 |
| Liberty & Democracy | 1. Steve Clancy; 2. Geoff Saw | 3,044 | 0.10 | +0.10 |
| Socialist Alliance | 1. Margarita Windisch; 2. Jeremy Smith | 2,535 | 0.08 | −0.08 |
| Socialist Equality Party (Note: Unknown if this is the same group that would be known as Socialist Equality Party from 2010 onwards) | 1. Peter Byrne; 2. Tania Baptist | 2,403 | 0.08 | +0.08 |
| Citizens Electoral Council | 1. Rachel Affleck; 2. Katherine Isherwood | 1,697 | 0.05 | −0.49 |
| Non-Custodial Parents | 1. Brendan Hall; 2. John Zabaneh | 1,511 | 0.05 | −0.06 |
| Secular | 1. John Perkins; 2. Andrew Conway | 1,238 | 0.04 | +0.04 |
| Group T | 1. Joseph Kaliniy; 2. Koulla Mesaritis | 522 | 0.02 | +0.02 |
| Group V | 1. Tony Klein; 2. Amanda Klein | 503 | 0.02 | +0.02 |
| Independent | Norman Walker | 383 | 0.01 | +0.01 |
| Independent | Tejay Sener | 185 | 0.01 | +0.01 |
| Independent | Darryl O'Bryan | 133 | 0.00 | +0.00 |
| One Nation | Llewellyn Groves | 48 | 0.00 | +0.00 |
| Total formal votes | | 3,182,369 | 96.72 | +1.85 |
| Informal votes | | 107,850 | 3.28 | −1.85 |
| Turnout | | 3,290,219 | 95.60 | +0.17 |

Labor once again narrowly finished ahead of the Coalition on primary votes with around 40% each. Both parties won two seats each on primary vote alone, with another two seats yet to be won. The Greens finished with just over 10% of the vote. After preferences from small minor parties, Labor managed to stay ahead of the Greens and Coalition. Preferences from the Democrats allowed the Greens to go ahead of the Coalition and close to the required number of votes to win a seat. However, preferences from Family First allowed the Coalition to win a third seat whilst Labor narrowly won the remaining seat over the Greens. The result was three seats each to the Coalition and Labor

== Queensland ==
| Elected | # | Senator | Party |
| 2007 | 1 | Ian Macdonald | Liberal |
| 2007 | 2 | John Hogg | Labor |
| 2007 | 3 | Sue Boyce | Liberal |
| 2007 | 4 | Claire Moore | Labor |
| 2007 | 5 | Ron Boswell | National |
| 2007 | 6 | Mark Furner | Labor |
2004
| 2004 | 1 | Brett Mason | Liberal |
| 2004 | 2 | Jan McLucas | Labor |
| 2004 | 3 | George Brandis | Liberal |
| 2004 | 4 | Joe Ludwig | Labor |
| 2004 | 5 | Barnaby Joyce | National |
| 2004 | 3 | Russell Trood | Liberal |

2007 Australian federal election: Senate, Queensland
| Party | Candidate | Votes | % | ±% |
|---|---|---|---|---|
| Quota | | 345,559 | | |
| Liberal/National Coalition | 1. Ian Macdonald (Lib) (elected 1); 2. Sue Boyce (Lib) (elected 3); 3. Ron Boswell (Nat) (elected 5); 4. Mark Powell (Lib); 5. David Goodwin (Nat); 6. Scott Buchholz (Nat) | 977,316 | 40.40 | −4.50 |
| Labor | 1. John Hogg (elected 2); 2. Claire Moore (elected 4); 3. Mark Furner (elected 6); 4. Diana O'Brien | 948,145 | 39.20 | +7.55 |
| Greens | 1. Larissa Waters; 2. Anja Light; 3. Darryl Rosin | 177,063 | 7.32 | +1.92 |
| Pauline's UAP | 1. Pauline Hanson; 2. David Saville | 101,461 | 4.19 | +4.19 |
| Family First | 1. Jeff Buchanan; 2. Beryl Spencer; 3. Merlin Manners; 4. Cathy Eaton; 5. Shaun Hart; 6. Elizabeth Benson-Scott | 53,249 | 2.20 | −1.17 |
| Democrats | 1. Andrew Bartlett; 2. Sharon Neill | 45,584 | 1.88 | −0.32 |
| Fishing Party | 1. Bob Smith; 2. Elizabeth Stocker | 20,290 | 0.84 | −0.44 |
| Fishing and Lifestyle | 1. Kevin Collins; 2. Dave Donald | 19,131 | 0.79 | +0.79 |
| What Women Want | 1. Anne Bousfield; 2. Sonya Beutel | 17,370 | 0.72 | +0.72 |
| Shooters | 1. Paul Feeney; 2. Allen Hrstich | 12,845 | 0.53 | +0.53 |
| Climate Change | 1. Phil Johnson; 2. Steve Posselt | 8,818 | 0.36 | +0.36 |
| Democratic Labor | 1. Noel Jackson; 2. Brian Dowling | 7265 | 0.30 | +0.30 |
| Christian Democrats | 1. Linda Brice; 2. Malcolm Brice | 6,289 | 0.26 | +0.26 |
| Carers Alliance | 1. Felicity Maddison; 2. Robert Gow | 4,822 | 0.20 | +0.20 |
| One Nation | 1. Ian Nelson; 2. Lew Arroita | 4,174 | 0.17 | −2.97 |
| Liberty & Democracy | 1. John Humphreys; 2. Joseph Clark | 3,890 | 0.16 | +0.16 |
| Socialist Alliance | 1. Sam Watson; 2. Amelia Taylor | 1,941 | 0.08 | −0.02 |
| FreeMatilda | 1. Richard Hackett-Jones; 2. John Rivett | 1,738 | 0.07 | +0.07 |
| Group X | 1. James Baker; 2. Louise Fitzgerald-Baker | 1,506 | 0.06 | +0.06 |
| Non-Custodial Parents | 1. Bill Healey; 2. Doug Thompson | 1,390 | 0.06 | −0.13 |
| Senator On-Line | 1. Ben Peake; 2. Sharon Bateson | 1,251 | 0.05 | +0.05 |
| Citizens Electoral Council | 1. Jan Pukallus; 2. Maurice Hetherington | 1,155 | 0.05 | −0.10 |
| Group N | 1. David Couper; 2. Michael Brown | 826 | 0.03 | +0.03 |
| Secular | 1. Katrina Alberts; 2. Martin Rady | 493 | 0.02 | +0.02 |
| Independent | John Duggan | 406 | 0.02 | +0.02 |
| Independent | Robin Petersen | 198 | 0.01 | +0.01 |
| Independent | Leo DeMarchi | 144 | 0.01 | +0.01 |
| Independent | James Reid | 70 | 0.00 | +0.00 |
| Independent | Marsileo Traversari | 52 | 0.00 | +0.00 |
| Independent | Pilly Low | 25 | 0.00 | +0.00 |
| Total formal votes | | 2,418,907 | 97.66 | +0.45 |
| Informal votes | | 57,912 | 2.34 | −0.45 |
| Turnout | | 2,476,819 | 94.81 | +0.68 |

The Coalition narrowly finished ahead of Labor on primary vote with around 40% each. The Greens finished with over 7% and Pauline's United Australia party with over 4%. The Coalition and Labor both won 2 seats each on primary vote alone. Preferences from the Democrats allowed the Greens to narrowly go ahead of Labor. Family first preferences were enough for Nationals candidate Ron Boswell to be re-elected and win a third seat for the Coalition. Pauline's United Australia party directed preferences to Labor which allowed them to win the final seat. The final result was three seats each to Labor and the Coalition.

== Western Australia ==
| Elected | # | Senator | Party |
| 2007 | 1 | David Johnston | Liberal |
| 2007 | 2 | Louise Pratt | Labor |
| 2007 | 3 | Alan Eggleston | Liberal |
| 2007 | 4 | Mark Bishop | Labor |
| 2007 | 5 | Michaelia Cash | Liberal |
| 2007 | 6 | Scott Ludlam | Greens |
2001
| 2004 | 1 | Chris Ellison | Liberal |
| 2004 | 2 | Chris Evans | Labor |
| 2004 | 3 | Ian Campbell | Liberal |
| 2004 | 4 | Glenn Sterle | Labor |
| 2004 | 5 | Judith Adams | Liberal |
| 2004 | 6 | Rachel Siewert | Greens |

2007 Australian federal election: Senate, Western Australia
| Party | Candidate | Votes | % | ±% |
|---|---|---|---|---|
| Quota | | 171,822 | | |
| Liberal | 1. David Johnston (elected 1); 2. Alan Eggleston (elected 3); 3. Michaelia Cash (elected 5); 4. Michael Mischin; 5. Jane Mouritz; 6. Matt Brown | 555,868 | 46.22 | −3.12 |
| Labor | 1. Louise Pratt (elected 2); 2. Mark Bishop (elected 4); 3. Ruth Webber | 433,046 | 36.00 | +3.48 |
| Greens | 1. Scott Ludlam (elected 6); 2. Alison Xamon; 3. Brenda Roy | 111,813 | 9.30 | +1.24 |
| Christian Democrats | 1. Gerard Goiran; 2. Peter Watt | 21,179 | 1.76 | −0.12 |
| National | 1. Tony Crook; 2. Wendy Duncan | 17,365 | 1.44 | +0.58 |
| Democrats | 1. Erica Lewin; 2. Rob Olver; 3. Don Hoddy | 12,604 | 1.05 | −0.95 |
| One Nation | 1. James Hopkinson; 2. Ron McLean | 11,623 | 0.97 | −1.48 |
| Democratic Labor | 1. Bob Boulger; 2. Eric Miller | 11,390 | 0.95 | +0.95 |
| Family First | 1. Linda Rose; 2. Cathie Fabian; 3. Steve Fuhrmann | 10,341 | 0.86 | +0.01 |
| What Women Want | 1. Meryki Basden; 2. Saywood Lane | 3,533 | 0.29 | +0.29 |
| Climate Change | 1. Gary Warden; 2. Sarah Bishop | 3,461 | 0.29 | +0.29 |
| Group P | 1. Graeme Campbell; 2. John Fischer; 3. Russell Graham; 4. Geoff Gibson | 1,621 | 0.13 | +0.13 |
| Carers Alliance | 1. Thomas Hoyer; 2. Shirley Primeau | 1,571 | 0.13 | +0.13 |
| Climate Conservatives | 1. Gerard Kettle; 2. Shirley Anton | 1,569 | 0.13 | +0.13 |
| Citizens Electoral Council | 1. Jean Robinson; 2. Stuart Smith | 1,002 | 0.08 | −0.11 |
| Non-Custodial Parents | 1. Geoff Dixon; 2. Mike Ward | 946 | 0.08 | −0.07 |
| Socialist Alliance | 1. Trent Hawkins; 2. Julie Gray | 928 | 0.08 | +0.08 |
| Senator On-Line | 1. Daniel Mayer; 2. Zoe Lamont | 824 | 0.07 | +0.07 |
| Group M | 1. Eric Wynne; 2. Kevin Fitzgerald | 819 | 0.07 | +0.07 |
| Liberty & Democracy | 1. Peter Whelan; 2. Daniel Parker | 591 | 0.05 | +0.05 |
| Independent | Richard McNaught | 291 | 0.02 | +0.02 |
| Secular | 1. Jennifer Armstrong; 2. Michael Tan | 271 | 0.02 | +0.02 |
| Independent | Edward Dabrowski | 94 | 0.01 | +0.01 |
| Total formal votes | | 1,202,750 | 97.58 | +1.12 |
| Informal votes | | 29,797 | 2.42 | −1.12 |
| Turnout | | 1,232,547 | 93.86 | +0.20 |

Unlike in other states, the Liberal Party of Australia and Nationals were not on a joint ticket. However, the Liberals finished far ahead of Labor in the primary vote with a 10% margin between them. The Greens finished with over 9% of the vote. The Liberals won three seats on primary vote alone whilst Labor won two. After these seats were distributed, the Greens were ahead of all parties. The Democratic Labor Party distributed preferences to the Christian Democrats, allowing them to go ahead of the Liberal party. Preferences from the Liberal Party allowed the Christian Democrats to go ahead of Labor and narrowly behind the Greens. However, preferences from Labor led to Greens candidate Scott Ludlam winning the final seat. The result was three seats to the Liberals, two to Labor and one to the Greens

== South Australia ==
| Elected | # | Senator | Party |
| 2007 | 1 | Don Farrell | Labor |
| 2007 | 2 | Cory Bernardi | Liberal |
| 2007 | 3 | Nick Xenophon | Independent |
| 2007 | 4 | Penny Wong | Labor |
| 2007 | 5 | Simon Birmingham | Liberal |
| 2007 | 6 | Sarah Hanson-Young | Greens |
2004
| 2004 | 1 | Nick Minchin | Liberal |
| 2004 | 2 | Anne McEwen | Labor |
| 2004 | 3 | Amanda Vanstone | Liberal |
| 2004 | 4 | Annette Hurley | Labor |
| 2004 | 5 | Mary Jo Fisher | Liberal |
| 2004 | 6 | Dana Wortley | Labor |

2007 Australian federal election: Senate, South Australia
| Party | Candidate | Votes | % | ±% |
|---|---|---|---|---|
| Quota | | 143,830 | | |
| Labor | 1. Don Farrell (elected 1); 2. Penny Wong (elected 4); 3. Cath Perry | 358,615 | 35.62 | +0.13 |
| Liberal | 1. Cory Bernardi (elected 2); 2. Simon Birmingham (elected 5); 3. Grant Chapman; 4. Maria Kourtesis | 347,256 | 34.49 | −13.00 |
| Group S | 1. Nick Xenophon (elected 3); 2. Roger Bryson | 148,789 | 14.78 | +14.78 |
| Greens | 1. Sarah Hanson-Young (elected 6); 2. Nikki Mortier; 3. Matt Rigney | 65,322 | 6.49 | −0.11 |
| Family First | 1. Tony Bates; 2. Toni Turnbull; 3. Colin Gibson | 29,114 | 2.89 | −1.09 |
| Democratic Labor | 1. Garry Hardy; 2. David McCabe | 9,343 | 0.93 | +0.93 |
| Democrats | 1. Ruth Russell; 2. Max Baumann; 3. Richard Way | 8,908 | 0.88 | −1.51 |
| One Nation | 1. Mark Aldridge; 2. David Dwyer | 6,178 | 0.61 | −0.53 |
| Fishing and Lifestyle | 1. Neil Armstrong; 2. Paul Tippins | 5,413 | 0.54 | +0.54 |
| What Women Want | 1. Emma Neumann; 2. Morag McIntosh | 4,114 | 0.41 | +0.41 |
| Shooters | 1. John Hahn; 2. Basil Borun | 3,973 | 0.39 | +0.39 |
| National | 1. Rob Howard; 2. Mark Cuthbertson | 3,632 | 0.36 | −0.04 |
| Climate Change | 1. Colin Endean; 2. Vidas Kubilius | 3,131 | 0.31 | +0.31 |
| Christian Democrats | 1. Bruno Colangelo; 2. Noelene Hunt | 1,486 | 0.15 | +0.15 |
| Liberty & Democracy | 1. David McAlary; 2. Mark Hill | 798 | 0.08 | +0.08 |
| Socialist Alliance | 1. Renfrey Clarke; 2. Liah Lazarou | 770 | 0.08 | −0.05 |
| Senator On-Line | 1. Joel Clark; 2. Courtney Clarke | 610 | 0.06 | +0.06 |
| Secular | 1. Brian Paterson; 2. A. Brook | 577 | 0.06 | +0.06 |
| Citizens Electoral Council | 1. Martin Vincent; 2. Paul Siebert | 267 | 0.03 | +0.03 |
| Independent | Michelle Drummond | 101 | 0.01 | +0.01 |
| Independent | Stewart Glass | 73 | 0.01 | +0.01 |
| Total formal votes | | 1,006,809 | 97.62 | +1.15 |
| Informal votes | | 24,511 | 2.38 | −1.15 |
| Turnout | | 1,031,320 | 95.83 | +0.47 |

Both major parties finished with around 35% each, with Independent Nick Xenophon at almost 15% followed by the Greens on over 6%. The Liberals and Labor won two seats each whilst Xenophon won a seat on primary vote alone. Preferences from the What Women Want (Australia) Party and the Climate Change Coalition allowed the Greens to go ahead of all parties. This was followed by preferences from the Democratic Labor Party and Family First going to the Liberals, which allowed the Coalition to go ahead of the Greens. However, the Greens managed to crucially stay ahead of Labor, which led to preferences from Labor going to the Greens. This was enough for Greens candidate Sarah Hanson-Young winning the remaining seat. The final result was two seats to the Liberals, two seats to Labor, one seat to Xenophon and one seat to the Greens

== Tasmania ==
| Elected | # | Senator | Party |
| 2007 | 1 | Nick Sherry | Labor |
| 2007 | 2 | Richard Colbeck | Liberal |
| 2007 | 3 | Bob Brown | Greens |
| 2007 | 4 | Carol Brown | Labor |
| 2007 | 5 | David Bushby | Liberal |
| 2007 | 6 | Catryna Bilyk | Labor |
2004
| 2004 | 1 | Eric Abetz | Liberal |
| 2004 | 2 | Kerry O'Brien | Labor |
| 2004 | 3 | Guy Barnett | Liberal |
| 2004 | 4 | Helen Polley | Labor |
| 2004 | 5 | Stephen Parry | Liberal |
| 2004 | 6 | Christine Milne | Greens |

2007 Australian federal election: Senate, Tasmania
| Party | Candidate | Votes | % | ±% |
|---|---|---|---|---|
| Quota | | 46,693 | | |
| Labor | 1. Nick Sherry (elected 1); 2. Carol Brown (elected 4); 3. Catryna Bilyk (elected 6) | 131,055 | 40.10 | +6.56 |
| Liberal | 1. Richard Colbeck (elected 2); 2. David Bushby (elected 5); 3. Don Morris | 122,203 | 37.39 | −8.74 |
| Greens | 1. Bob Brown (elected 3); 2. Andrew Wilkie; 3. Sophie Houghton; 4. Scott Jordan | 59,254 | 18.13 | +4.84 |
| Family First | 1. Jacquie Petrusma; 2. Andrew Bennett; 3. Betty Roberts | 6,663 | 2.04 | −0.34 |
| What Women Want | 1. Debra Cashion; 2. Belinda Gleeson | 2,540 | 0.78 | +0.78 |
| Democratic Labor | 1. Pat Crea; 2. Joan Shackcloth | 2,061 | 0.63 | +0.63 |
| Group G | 1. Dino Ottavi; 2. Mick Cook; 3. Chris Smallbane | 1,398 | 0.43 | +0.03 |
| Group C | 1. Steve Martin; 2. Karley Nelson | 789 | 0.24 | −0.12 |
| Citizens Electoral Council | 1. Caroline Larner; 2. Michael Phibbs | 313 | 0.10 | −0.06 |
| Liberty & Democracy | 1. Bede Ireland; 2. Luke Hamilton | 302 | 0.09 | +0.09 |
| Secular | 1. Robyn Doyle; 2. David Hammond | 268 | 0.08 | +0.08 |
| Total formal votes | | 326,846 | 97.37 | +0.74 |
| Informal votes | | 8,830 | 2.63 | −0.74 |
| Turnout | | 335,676 | 95.98 | +0.08 |

Labor finished ahead of the Liberals with around 40% of the vote each, followed by the Greens with over 18%. Labor and the Liberals each won two seats on primary vote alone whilst the Greens won one on primary vote. Preferences from the Greens led to Labor winning the remaining seat. The final result was three seats to Labor, two seats to the Liberals and one seat to the Greens.

== Territories ==
=== Australian Capital Territory ===
| Elected | # | Senator | Party |
| 2007 | 1 | Kate Lundy | Labor |
| 2007 | 2 | Gary Humphries | Liberal |

2007 Australian federal election: Senate, Australian Capital Territory
| Party | Candidate | Votes | % | ±% |
|---|---|---|---|---|
| Quota | | 75,108 | | |
| Labor | 1. Kate Lundy (elected 1); 2. Peter Conway | 92,018 | 40.84 | −0.26 |
| Liberal | 1. Gary Humphries (elected 2); 2. Jacqui Myers | 77,058 | 34.20 | −3.67 |
| Greens | 1. Kerrie Tucker; 2. Elena Kirschbaum | 48,384 | 21.47 | +5.11 |
| Democrats | 1. Norvan Vogt; 2. Anthony David | 4,141 | 1.84 | −0.30 |
| What Women Want | 1. Emma Davidson; 2. Shannon Morris | 1,406 | 0.62 | +0.62 |
| Climate Change | 1. Michael Fullam-Stone; 2. Andrew Gee | 1,323 | 0.59 | +0.59 |
| Liberty & Democracy | 1. Lisa Milat; 2. Chris Textor | 545 | 0.24 | +0.24 |
| Nuclear Disarmament | 1. Michael Denborough; 2. Erica Denborough | 446 | 0.20 | +0.20 |
| Total formal votes | | 225,321 | 98.30 | +0.76 |
| Informal votes | | 3,905 | 1.70 | −0.76 |
| Turnout | | 229,226 | 96.00 | +0.79 |

=== Northern Territory ===
| Elected | # | Senator | Party |
| 2007 | 1 | Trish Crossin | Labor |
| 2007 | 2 | Nigel Scullion | CLP |

2007 Australian federal election: Senate, Northern Territory
| Party | Candidate | Votes | % | ±% |
|---|---|---|---|---|
| Quota | | 33,524 | | |
| Labor | 1. Trish Crossin (elected 1); 2. Kim Hill | 47,205 | 46.94 | +5.57 |
| Country Liberal | 1. Nigel Scullion (elected 2); 2. Bernadette Wallace | 40,253 | 40.03 | −5.37 |
| Greens | 1. Alan Tyley; 2. Gregory Goodluck | 8,870 | 8.82 | +1.22 |
| Citizens Electoral Council | 1. Peter Flynn; 2. Vernon Work | 2,019 | 2.01 | +2.01 |
| Democrats | 1. Duncan Dean; 2. Joe Faggion | 1,949 | 1.94 | −2.79 |
| Independent | Bernardine Atkinson | 273 | 0.27 | |
| Total formal votes | | 100,569 | 98.06 | +1.18 |
| Informal votes | | 1,994 | 1.94 | −1.18 |
| Turnout | | 102,563 | 86.88 | +2.47 |

== See also ==
- Members of the Australian Senate, 2008–2011
- Results of the 2007 Australian federal election (House of Representatives)
