= Maternity Choices Australia =

Maternity Choices Australia, formerly the Maternity Coalition is an Australian advocacy group which aims to improve the provision of maternity services to parents. It consists of individuals as well as other non-government organisations.

== Philosophy ==
The Maternity Coalition:

- encourages a woman-centred approach to the birth process;
- regard pregnancy and childbirth as normal physiological processes, not illnesses;
- stresses the social, cultural and psychological factors influencing childbirth;
- supports midwives as the primary caregivers for women in normal birth;
- emphasises women's rights to make informed choices about their caregiver and place of birth;
- promotes continuous assessment and critical evaluation of technologies used in maternity care;
- supports the development of services sensitive to women's varied cultural and physical needs.

Its statement seeking political reform of maternity services is outlined in the National Maternity Action Plan which was prepared by The Maternity Coalition in 2002.

== Membership ==
As an umbrella organization it has institutional members from all States and Territories as well as individuals.

- Friends of the Birth Centre, Canberra
- Friends of the Birth Centre, Mackay
- Australian College of Midwives

Individual founding members include:

- Kerreen Reiger

== Presidents ==
=== National ===
- Robyn Payne 1998-2000
- Dr Barbara Vernon 2001 - 2003
- Justine Caines 2003 - 2005
- Leslie Arnott, 2006
- Cas McCulloch, 2007
- Louise Hartley, 2008
- Lisa Metcalfe, 2009-2010
- Ann Catchlove, 2010

=== Queensland ===
- Bruce Teakle 2002 - incumbent

=== ACT ===
- Ingrid McKenzie 2003 - incumbent

== Journal ==
It publishes a quarterly journal entitled Birth Matters.
