= Kerreen Reiger =

Australian academic, sociologist and author

Kerreen M. Reiger (1946-2026) was an Australian academic, sociologist and author. She lived in Melbourne and taught sociology at La Trobe University. She had a special interest in family, motherhood and childbirth and was one of the founders of the activist group Maternity Coalition.

== Personal life and death ==
Reiger had four children, two step-children, and 13 grandchildren. She died from a terminal illness on 12 January 2026.

== Bibliography ==
- Our Bodies, Our Babies – the forgotten women's movement, Kerreen Reiger, Melbourne University Press, Melbourne, 2001 ISBN 0-522-84982-2
- Family Economy'
- Disenchantment of the Home – Modernizing the Australian Family
