= Brian Lindsay =

Australian politician

Member of the Queensland Legislative Assembly for Everton
- In office 7 December 1974 – 12 November 1977
- Preceded by: Gerry Jones
- Succeeded by: Glen Milliner

Personal details
- Born: Brian David Valentine Lindsay; 22 January 1937 (age 89) Ashgrove, Queensland, Australia
- Party: Liberal Party
- Spouse: Margaret Ann Corley (m.1961)
- Education: University of Queensland
- Occupation: Soldier, Teacher

Brian David Valentine Lindsay (born 22 January 1937) is an Australian politician. He was a Liberal Party member of the Legislative Assembly of Queensland from 1974 until 1977, representing the electorate of Everton.

Lindsay was born in Ashgrove, the grandson of Labor Senator John MacDonald, and was educated at St Finbar's Convent and Marist Brothers College. He attended the Royal Military College, Duntroon from 1955 to 1958, then entered the military, serving with the Pacific Islands Regiment from 1959 to 1963 and with the regular army in Papua New Guinea, Malaya, Borneo, and in the Vietnam War. He was mentioned in despatches for distinguished active service in South Vietnam in 1968–1969, but was discharged with the rank of major as a result of injuries suffered in Vietnam. Lindsay subsequently studied to become a teacher, variously attending Melbourne Teacher's College, Kelvin Grove Teachers College and the University of Queensland. He taught at Marist Brothers College from 1973 until his election to parliament the following year.

Lindsay was elected to the Legislative Assembly at the 1974 state election, winning the usually safe Labor seat of Everton amidst the Liberal-National landslide victory that year. He differed from Premier Joh Bjelke-Petersen on the issue of death duties, favouring their removal more slowly than that sought by Bjelke-Petersen, and later antagonised gay and lesbian activists by, in response to debate about whether gay teachers should be allowed in Queensland, requesting assurance from the Education Minister that 'young men and women with such unfortunate and unnatural personal lifestyles are never admitted to the profession'. He was defeated by Labor candidate Glen Milliner at the 1977 election.

Lindsay is married with one son and one daughter.

Parliament of Queensland
Preceded by Gerry Jones	Member for Everton; 1974–1977	Succeeded by Glen Milliner
