= Gerry Jones (politician) =

Australian politician

Senator for Queensland
- In office 1 July 1981 – 30 June 1996

Member of the Queensland Legislative Assembly for Everton
- In office 27 May 1972 – 7 December 1974
- Preceded by: New seat
- Succeeded by: Brian Lindsay

Personal details
- Born: Norman Francis Jones; 16 August 1932 Roma, Queensland
- Died: 21 April 2017 (aged 84)
- Party: Australian Labor Party
- Spouse: Rita June Freda Turner (m.1956)
- Occupation: Building contractor, Research officer

Norman Francis Jones (16 August 1932 – 21 April 2017), known as Gerry Jones, was an Australian politician. Born at Roma, Queensland, he was a research assistant before becoming state organiser of the Queensland Labor Party 1967–1972. He was elected to the Legislative Assembly of Queensland as the member for Everton at the 1972 state election, but was defeated in the landslide Labor loss of 1974. He was a Labor Party Executive Officer 1976–1977 and State Secretary 1977–1980. In 1980, he was elected to the Australian Senate as a Labor Senator for Queensland. He remained in the Senate until his retirement in 1996.

Following the announcement of the 1987 Senate election results, Jones was one of four senators who received a three-year term as a consequence of which method was chosen to allocate the seats.

He died on 21 April 2017.

Parliament of Queensland
New seat	Member for Everton; 1972–1974	Succeeded by Brian Lindsay
