= Rod Welford =

Australian politician (1958–2025)

The Honourable Rod Welford

Minister for Education and the Arts
- In office 28 July 2005 – 26 March 2009
- Premier: Peter Beattie; Anna Bligh
- Preceded by: Anna Bligh
- Succeeded by: Geoff Wilson (Education); Anna Bligh (Arts)

Attorney-General of Queensland Minister for Justice
- In office 22 February 2001 – 28 July 2005
- Premier: Peter Beattie
- Preceded by: Matt Foley
- Succeeded by: Linda Lavarch

Minister for Environment and Heritage
- In office 29 June 1998 – 22 February 2001
- Premier: Peter Beattie
- Preceded by: Brian Littleproud
- Succeeded by: Dean Wells

Minister for Natural Resources
- In office 29 June 1998 – 22 February 2001
- Premier: Peter Beattie
- Preceded by: Lawrence Springborg
- Succeeded by: Stephen Robertson

Shadow Minister for Environment and Heritage
- In office 27 February 1996 – 29 June 1998
- Leader: Peter Beattie
- Preceded by: Doug Slack
- Succeeded by: Vince Lester

Member of the Queensland Legislative Assembly for Everton
- In office 19 September 1992 – 21 March 2009
- Preceded by: Glen Milliner
- Succeeded by: Murray Watt

Member of the Queensland Legislative Assembly for Stafford
- In office 2 December 1989 – 19 September 1992
- Preceded by: Terry Gygar
- Succeeded by: Seat abolished

Personal details
- Born: Rodney Jon Welford; 30 September 1958 Brisbane, Queensland, Australia
- Died: 28 June 2025 (aged 66)
- Party: Labor
- Spouse: Rosemary Anne Walters
- Education: University of Queensland
- Occupation: Solicitor, Barrister

Rodney Jon Welford (30 September 1958 – 28 June 2025) was an Australian politician from Queensland. He served as a Labor Party Member of Parliament in the Legislative Assembly of Queensland from 1989 to 2009.

== Early life ==
Welford was born in Brisbane on 30 September 1958. He attended St Paul's Anglican School in Bald Hills.

He was a prominent solicitor of the Supreme Court of Queensland and barrister of the High Court of Australia prior to entering parliament. His qualifications are Bachelor of Arts (First Class Honours), Bachelor of Laws, Graduate Diploma in Legal Practice, Graduate Diploma in Industrial Relations and a Master of Science (Environmental Management) and Certificate in Permaculture Design.

Welford was active in his community as a member of the Royal Life Saving Society Australia and a branch, state and national medal winner for his Surf Life Saving Club Burleigh Heads Mowbray Park on the Gold Coast. He was the first honorary State Education Officer of the Surf Life Saving Association and Technical Director of the Royal Life Saving Society in the early 1980s. He also worked as a professional lifeguard for the Gold Coast City Council while completing university studies.

Also during his university studies Welford served on the student union of the University of Queensland.

== Political career ==
Welford entered state parliament as the member for Stafford at the 1989 state election. He switched to the district of Everton at the 1992 state election, which he held until his decision not to stand for re-election at the State election in 2009.

Welford served in a number of portfolios in the Labor governments of Premiers Peter Beattie and Anna Bligh. He was the Minister for Environment and Heritage and Minister for Natural Resources from 1998 to 2001. He was the Attorney-General and Minister for Justice from 2001 to 2005. He was the Minister for Education and Minister for the Arts from 2005 to 2009, as well as the Minister for Training from 2006 to 2009.

Before serving as a State Minister, he had led a Ministerial Review of Sports Funding (1990–91) leading to the creation of the Queensland Academy of Sport and chaired the Government Sustainable Energy Advisory Group (1994–95), a joint government-industry committee, which undertook projects providing the foundation for subsequent government grants programs to subsidise the installation of household solar water heaters and remote area solar power systems.

As a minister, his focus on active policy development attracted recognition for innovative policy initiatives. For example, while responsible for the environment and natural resources portfolio, he established the Queensland Environmental Protection Agency, took action to protect biodiversity and reduce greenhouse emissions by introducing ground-breaking legislation to stem broadscale land clearing, created the first large scale water efficiency program in the nation, legislated to protect environmental health of river systems and forged a historic Regional Forest Agreement between the government, timber industry and conservation movement which secured sustainable timber production while expanding the national park estate by more than 400,000 hectares. He was the Australian State Government representative at the United Nations Commission for Sustainable Development in 2000.

== After politics ==
After leaving Parliament, Welford was chief executive of the Australian Council of Recycling Inc (ACOR), the national peak industry body for the recycling industry in Australia (2009–2013). While in this role, he held positions as a company director on ASX-listed public companies, including deputy chairman of the board of directors of AstiVita Renewables Limited, a non-executive director of Excela Limited, and board member of State power company, Stanwell Corporation Limited. He was also an honorary member of the board of the International River Foundation, honorary interim board member of the National Centre of Excellence for Desalination at Murdoch University and patron of the Centre for Research, Innovation and Future Development at St Paul's School, his former high school. He was also the chairman and CEO of Ensight, a specialist energy system design firm based in Brisbane.

He then worked in the fields of energy efficiency, renewable energy and recycling. He was also board chairman of the Electrogroup group of companies, a non-profit enterprise that operates a group training and apprenticeship service for the electrotechnology industry and chairman of the Energy Management Institute, a non-profit company established to train and accredit electrical contractors with skills in energy efficiency design and retrofitting.

He was subsequently the patron of the Albany Creek Junior Rugby League Football Club, the Pine Hills Sports Club and the Mitchelton Senior Citizens Association.

== Personal life and death ==
Welford was the sole parent of a daughter who has Down's Syndrome. His personal interests included philosophy, permaculture, environmental design, swimming, surfing and the performing arts.

Welford died on 28 June 2025, at the age of 66.

Parliament of Queensland
Preceded by Terry Gygar	Member for Stafford; 1989–1992	Succeeded by Seat abolished
Preceded by Glen Milliner	Member for Everton; 2001–2009	Succeeded by Murray Watt
