= Geoff Wilson (Australian politician) =

Australian politician

The Hon Geoff Wilson

Minister for Health
- In office 21 February 2011 – 26 March 2012
- Premier: Anna Bligh
- Preceded by: Paul Lucas
- Succeeded by: Lawrence Springborg

Minister for Education and Training
- In office 26 March 2009 – 21 February 2011
- Premier: Anna Bligh
- Preceded by: Rod Welford
- Succeeded by: Cameron Dick (as Education)

Minister for Mines and Energy
- In office 13 September 2006 – 26 March 2009
- Premier: Peter Beattie; Anna Bligh
- Preceded by: Henry Palaszczuk (Mines); John Mickel (Energy)
- Succeeded by: Stephen Robertson

Member of the Queensland Legislative Assembly for Ferny Grove
- In office 13 June 1998 – 23 March 2012
- Preceded by: Glen Milliner
- Succeeded by: Dale Shuttleworth

Personal details
- Born: Geoffrey James Wilson; 5 November 1952 (age 73) Culcairn, New South Wales, Australia
- Party: Labor
- Children: 3
- Education: Australian National University
- Occupation: Barrister

Geoffrey James Wilson (born 5 November 1952) is a former Australian politician.

== Early life and career ==
Born in Culcairn in New South Wales, he was a barrister and union official before entering the Legislative Assembly.

== Member of parliament ==
In 1998, he was elected to the Legislative Assembly of Queensland as the Labor member for Ferny Grove, which he represented until 2012.

From January 2002 until October 2006 he chaired the Parliamentary Crime and Misconduct Committee.

=== Government minister ===
He was appointed minister for mines and energy in September 2006 by Peter Beattie, and continued in that post after Anna Bligh took over as premier a year later.

Following the 2009 election, he was named minister for education and training. In the February 2011 reshuffle, he was appointed minister for health. He served in that post until Labor's loss at 2012 election, in which Wilson lost his seat to the LNP.

Parliament of Queensland
| Preceded by Glen Milliner | Member for Ferny Grove; 1998–2012 | Succeeded by Dale Shuttleworth |
