= Electoral district of Ferny Grove =

State electoral district of Queensland, Australia

Ferny Grove Queensland—Legislative Assembly
- Map of the electoral district of Ferny Grove, 2017
- State: Queensland
- MP: Mark Furner
- Party: Labor
- Namesake: Ferny Grove
- Electors: 36,224 (2020)
- Area: 49 km^{2} (18.9 sq mi)
- Demographic: Outer-metropolitan
- Coordinates: 27°21′S 152°51′E
Electorates around Ferny Grove:
Pine Rivers	Everton	Everton
Pine Rivers	Ferny Grove	Everton
Cooper	Cooper	Stafford

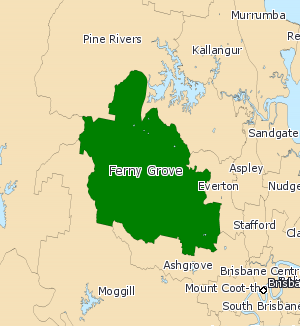
2008 map

Ferny Grove is one of the 89 electoral districts for the Legislative Assembly of Queensland in Australia. Located in northwest Brisbane, it is named for the suburb of Ferny Grove. It was first created in 1992, and was represented by Labor from its creation until the 2012 election, in which the LNP won with a 59.5 percent two-party vote.

The election is notable for having decided the 2015 state election. Labor won the seat back on a swing of 10 percent, just barely what it needed to take the seat off the LNP. However, the Palmer United Party candidate for Ferny Grove, Mark Taverner, was revealed to be an undischarged bankrupt and therefore ineligible to run. The revelation spurred speculation that a by-election would be needed to resolve the seat. However, ABC election analyst Antony Green believed that the Ferny Grove outcome and potential by-election will not affect who forms government. The Ferny Grove tally later indicated that the Palmer candidate did not have an effect on the outcome of the election, dampening chances of the Court of Disputed Returns ordering a by-election. The Electoral Commission of Queensland initially indicated it would refer the situation to the Court of Disputed Returns. However, on 13 February, when it declared the results of all outstanding seats, the commission said it would not refer the Ferny Grove result to the court. This made Ferny Grove the 44th seat won by Labor, formally clearing the way for Labor leader Annastacia Palaszczuk to form a minority government.

== Members for Ferny Grove ==
Member	Party	Term
Glen Milliner	Labor	1992–1998
Geoff Wilson	Labor	1998–2012
Dale Shuttleworth	Liberal National	2012–2015
Mark Furner	Labor	2015–present

== Election results ==
2024 Queensland state election: Ferny Grove
Party	Candidate	Votes	%	±%
Labor	Mark Furner	13,631	39.78	−5.32
Liberal National	Nelson Savanh	12,290	35.87	+2.73
Greens	Elizabeth McAulay	6,679	19.49	+4.30
One Nation	Leonie Swanner	1,664	4.86	+1.90
Total formal votes		34,264	97.64	+0.26
Informal votes		828	2.36	−0.26
Turnout		35,092	92.31	+0.67
Two-party-preferred result
Labor	Mark Furner	19,834	57.89	−3.08
Liberal National	Nelson Savanh	14,430	42.11	+3.08
Labor hold		Swing	−3.08	

Primary vote results in Ferny Grove (Parties that have never gotten 5% of the vote are omitted)
Labor
Liberal/Liberal National

National

Greens
One Nation
Family First
Independent
View source data.
Two-party-preferred vote vote results in Ferny Grove View source data.
