= What Women Want (Australia) =

- Leader: Justine Caines
- Founded: April 2007
- Dissolved: 30 March 2010
- Headquarters: PO Box 625; Scone NSW 2337
- Ideology: Women's rights Feminism
- Political position: Centre-left

Website
- http://www.whatwomenwant.org.au/

What Women Want was an Australian political organisation launched in April 2007 which, its website says, "aims to be Australia's first female political party dedicated to advancing issues affecting Australian women". The organisation was formed by Justine Caines, a mother of six and political activist from rural New South Wales.

In the 2007 general elections, the party stood candidates for the Senate in every jurisdiction except the Northern Territory, and secured approximately half a percent of the Senate vote nationwide. Preference distributions reported by the ABC indicated the party's preferences flowed mainly to the Greens (or if the Greens candidate was excluded, the ALP).

The party was deregistered on 30 March 2010 after failing to respond to an Australian Electoral Commission notice to update its membership records.
