= Hear Our Voice =

- Leader: Toni McLennan
- Founded: 2007
- Dissolved: 2010
- Ideology: Social justice

Website
- http://www.tonimclennan.com/

Hear Our Voice was an Australian political party founded in 2007, based on the ideals of social justice.

The party ran in the Senate in New South Wales at the 2007 federal election. Two candidates ran, Toni McLennan and Lindsay Carroll.

The party advocates a closing in the gap between Australia's rich and poor, wants more women in Australian politics, improvements in the rights of gay people and the elderly, and was against Howard government policies including WorkChoices and the treatment of asylum seekers, as well as involvement in US-led attacks such as the Iraq War. The party particularly targeted the LGBT community in their campaigning.

McLennan had recently resigned from the Australian Labor Party after being defeated for preselection in the lower house seat of Eden-Monaro. She had been defeated by army officer Colonel Mike Kelly after delegates voted at the party's national conference to reduce the role rank-and-file members play in preselections.

The party's website has not been updated since the 2007 election. It was voluntarily deregistered on 4 March 2010.
