= Dale Shuttleworth =

Australian politician

Member of the Queensland Legislative Assembly for Ferny Grove
- In office 24 March 2012 – 31 January 2015
- Preceded by: Geoff Wilson
- Succeeded by: Mark Furner

Personal details
- Born: 5 August 1964 (age 61) Mackay, Queensland
- Party: Liberal National Party (2008–present); Family First Party (2002–2008)
- Children: 3
- Education: Deakin University, Australian Institute of Company Directors
- Website: DaleShuttleworth.com.au

Dale Shuttleworth (born 5 August 1964) is an Australian Liberal National politician who was the member of the Legislative Assembly of Queensland for Ferny Grove from 2012 to 2015, having defeated the Minister of Health Geoff Wilson at the 2012 state election.

== Early life and education ==
Shuttleworth was born in Mackay, Queensland.

After 12 years' service in the Royal Australian Navy (RAN) in 1994 retired from active duty. In 1996 Shuttleworth moved back to Queensland, and in the time since, has married and raised his three children in the local area he represented.

Whilst in the navy he gained qualifications in electronic engineering. After leaving the navy he furthered his study, completing a graduate diploma in business management through Deakin University and the Company Directors Diploma through the Australian Institute of Company Directors.

Prior to being elected as the state member for Ferny Grove, he was employed with an Australian software development company, where he was successful in business development and account management. Shuttleworth has been a senior manager for a number of Brisbane-based companies providing technical solutions in Communications, Flow (Water/Wastewater) monitoring and telemetry systems or automated machine guidance and GPS collision avoidance or geo-fencing applications.

== Politics ==
Prior to joining the LNP, Shuttleworth stood in a few elections for the Family First Party. He was a Family First at the 2004 federal election (in Dickson), the 2006 state election (in Everton), and the 2007 federal election (in Dickson). Shuttleworth first contested Ferny Grove at the 2009 state election. He lost to Labor incumbent Geoff Wilson, but reduced the Labor margin from 11 percent to four percent. Three years later, he defeated Wilson as part of an LNP wave that swept Queensland. He scored a 14-point swing, turning Ferny Grove into a safe LNP seat.

In May 2012, shortly after his election win, Shuttleworth was appointed to the Health and Community Services Committee (HCSC) which includes portfolio areas of Health, Community Services, National Parks, Sport, Recreation and Racing and Aboriginal, Islander and Multi-cultural affairs. He also served as an advisor to the Minister for Science, Information Technology, Innovation and the Arts as part of the portfolio backbench committee. Shuttleworth was defeated at the 2015 state election by Labor candidate Mark Furner.

=== Electoral History ===
Queensland Legislative Assembly
Election year	Electorate	Party	Votes	FP%	+/-	2PP%	+/-	Result
2006	Everton	FFP	1,823	7.10	▲7.10	N/A	N/A	Fourth
2009	Ferny Grove	LNP	10,941	39.30	▲9.40	45.50	▲7.60	Second
2012	Ferny Grove	LNP	15,458	54.36	▲15.07	59.52	▲14.01	First
2015	Ferny Grove	LNP	13,214	44.59	▼9.77	49.18	▼10.34	Second

Australian House of Representatives
Election year	Electorate	Party	Votes	FP%	+/-	2PP%	+/-	Result
2004	Dickson	FFP	3,454	4.52	▲4.52	N/A	N/A	Fourth
2007	Dickson	FFP	2,118	2.54	▼1.75	N/A	N/A	Fourth

Parliament of Queensland
Preceded by Geoff Wilson	Member for Ferny Grove; 2012–2015	Succeeded by Mark Furner
