= Justine Caines =

Australian activist

Justine Maree Caines OAM (21 February 1973 – 12 September 2022) was a lobbyist and advocate in Australia. She died aged 49 years, following a 14-month battle with glioblastoma on 12 September 2022.

== Activism ==
Justine Caines was National President of Maternity Coalition, the national umbrella organization for maternity lobbying in Australia from 2003 to 2005 and 2008–09. She was the National Co-ordinator of Homebirth Australia from 2001 to 2006 and secretary from 2006 to 2010. She was also National Advocacy Advisor for Maternity Coalition. In 2007 she founded What Women Want, a political party. What Women Want aims to give Australian women a greater voice in decision making and bring a broad social policy framework back on the agenda. The party gained approximately 60,000 votes in the 2007 election, but did not run candidates in 2010. Instead Caines supported four independent candidates in key seats, Robertson, Macquarie, Dickson and Corangamite. The votes received in Corangamite were pivotal to the formation of the minority Gillard Government. Caines received the Order of Australia Medal in the 2011 Australia Day Awards for "service to the community, particularly in the area of women's health, maternity care and education."
