= Glen Milliner =

Australian politician

The Hon Glen Milliner

Member of the Queensland Legislative Assembly for Everton
- In office 12 November 1977 – 19 September 1992
- Preceded by: Brian Lindsay
- Succeeded by: Rod Welford

Member of the Queensland Legislative Assembly for Ferny Grove
- In office 19 September 1992 – 13 June 1998
- Preceded by: New seat
- Succeeded by: Geoff Wilson

Personal details
- Born: Glen Richard Milliner; 14 April 1948 (age 77) Brisbane, Queensland, Australia
- Party: Labor
- Occupation: Machine compositor, Newsagent

Glen Richard Milliner (born 14 April 1948) is an Australian compositor, businessman and politician who was a Labor member of the Legislative Assembly of Queensland for the electoral district of Everton from 1977 to 1992, and then for the new electoral district of Ferny Grove from 1992 to 1998. Under the Goss Ministry, he served in the Cabinet variously as Minister for Justice, Minister for Consumer Affairs (until 18 October 1993), Minister for Corrective Services (until 18 October 1993), and Minister for Administrative Services (from 18 October 1993).

== Background ==
He is the son of trade union activist and Labor Senator from Queensland, Bert Milliner. Like his father, he is a qualified typesetter and compositor; he also owns a news agency. He is married and has three children.

== Elected office ==
He was first elected to the Assembly for the seat of Everton in the 1977 election, unseating Liberal incumbent Brian Lindsay. In 1992 he switched to the newly created seat of Ferny Grove where he remained till his retirement from politics.

He did not run for re-election in 1998, and was succeeded by fellow Labor member Geoff Wilson.

Parliament of Queensland
Preceded by Brian Lindsay	Member for Everton; 1977–1992	Succeeded by Rod Welford
New seat	Member for Ferny Grove; 1992–1998	Succeeded by Geoff Wilson
