= Electoral district of Everton =

State electoral district of Queensland, Australia

Everton Queensland—Legislative Assembly
- Everton electoral district map 2017
- State: Queensland
- Dates current: 1972–present
- MP: Tim Mander
- Party: Liberal National
- Namesake: Everton Park
- Electors: 37,520 (2020)
- Area: 48 km^{2} (18.5 sq mi)
- Demographic: Outer-metropolitan
- Coordinates: 27°22′S 152°57′E
Electorates around Everton:
Pine Rivers	Pine Rivers	Aspley
Pine Rivers	Everton	Aspley
Ferny Grove	Ferny Grove	Stafford

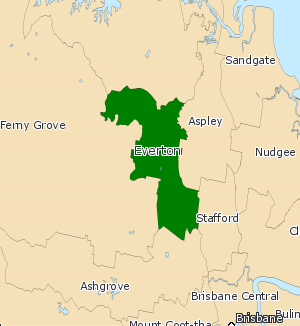
2008 electoral district map

Everton is an electoral district of the Legislative Assembly in the Australian state of Queensland.

The division encompasses suburbs in Brisbane's north west between Kedron Brook and the South Pine River, including Everton Park, Everton Hills, McDowall and Albany Creek. Parts of Mitchelton are located in the electorate.

== Members for Everton ==
Member	Party	Term
Gerry Jones	Labor	1972–1974
Brian Lindsay	Liberal	1974–1977
Glen Milliner	Labor	1977–1992
Rod Welford	Labor	1992–2009
Murray Watt	Labor	2009–2012
Tim Mander	Liberal National	2012–present

== Election results ==
2024 Queensland state election: Everton
Party	Candidate	Votes	%	±%
Liberal National	Tim Mander	17,710	49.43	+3.64
Labor	Michelle Byard	12,106	33.79	−4.00
Greens	Brent McDowall	4,370	12.20	+3.02
One Nation	Alan Buchbach	1,643	4.58	+1.47
Total formal votes		35,829	97.26	−0.48
Informal votes		1,010	2.74	+0.48
Turnout		36,839	92.70	+0.66
Two-party-preferred result
Liberal National	Tim Mander	19,801	55.27	+3.03
Labor	Michelle Byard	16,028	44.73	−3.03
Liberal National hold		Swing	+3.03	

Primary vote results in Everton (Parties that have never gotten 5% of the vote are omitted)
Labor
Liberal National

Liberal
Country/National

Greens
One Nation
Australian Democrats
Queensland Labor
City Country Alliance
Family First
Progress
Independent
View source data.
Two-candidate-preferred vote results in Everton View source data.

2020 Queensland state election: Everton
Party	Candidate	Votes	%	±%
Liberal National	Tim Mander	15,455	45.79	−5.97
Labor	Danielle Shankey	12,755	37.79	+1.91
Greens	Helen Rath	3,098	9.18	−3.17
One Nation	Mal Johnson	1,051	3.11	+3.11
Legalise Cannabis	Frank Jordan	871	2.58	+2.58
Informed Medical Options	Joanne Dissanayake	264	0.78	+0.78
United Australia	Simon Russ	152	0.45	+0.45
Independent	Jabez Wells	105	0.31	+0.31
Total formal votes		33,751	97.74	+1.52
Informal votes		782	2.26	−1.52
Turnout		34,533	92.04	+0.70
Two-party-preferred result
Liberal National	Tim Mander	17,630	52.24	−2.71
Labor	Danielle Shankey	16,121	47.76	+2.71
Liberal National hold		Swing	−2.71	
