= Mark Furner =

Australian politician

The Honourable Mark Furner MP
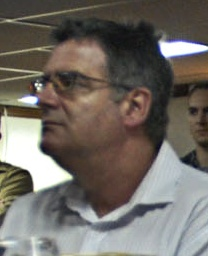

Minister for Agricultural Industry Development and Fisheries of Queensland
- In office 12 December 2017 – 28 October 2024
- Premier: Annastacia Palaszczuk; Steven Miles
- Preceded by: Bill Byrne
- Succeeded by: Jarrod Bleijie

Minister for Local Government of Queensland
- In office 10 February 2017 – 12 December 2017
- Premier: Annastacia Palaszczuk
- Preceded by: Jackie Trad
- Succeeded by: Stirling Hinchliffe

Minister for Aboriginal and Torres Strait Islander Partnerships of Queensland
- In office 10 February 2017 – 12 December 2017
- Premier: Annastacia Palaszczuk
- Preceded by: Curtis Pitt
- Succeeded by: Jackie Trad

Senator for Queensland
- In office 1 July 2008 – 30 June 2014
- Preceded by: Andrew Bartlett
- Succeeded by: Glenn Lazarus

Member of the Queensland Legislative Assembly for Ferny Grove
- Incumbent
- Assumed office 31 January 2015
- Preceded by: Dale Shuttleworth

Personal details
- Born: 11 April 1958 (age 68) Brisbane, Queensland
- Party: Australian Labor Party
- Spouse: Lorraine Furner
- Children: 3
- Education: Queensland University of Technology
- Occupation: Union Official
- Website: www.markfurnermp.com.au

Mark Lionel Furner (born 11 April 1958) is an Australian politician. He was a Labor member of Australian Senate from 2008 to 2014, representing the state of Queensland. Since the 2015 Queensland state election, he has represented Ferny Grove in the Queensland Legislative Assembly.

== Early life and education ==
Furner was born in Brisbane, Queensland and grew up a housing commission development in Chermside. Initially working as a tradesman in the transport industry, he graduated from the Queensland University of Technology with an associate diploma of business with a major in industrial relations.

Between 1989 and 2008 he worked as a union official for the Transport Workers' Union, the Queensland Police Union, and the National Union of Workers. Furner held a range of positions within the Labor Party between 1996 and 2008.

== Career ==
He was elected to the Senate at the 2007 federal election as the third candidate of the Labor Party Senate ticket in Queensland. He was defeated at the 2013 federal election and his term ended on 30 June 2014.

He won the seat of Ferny Grove representing Labor at the 2015 Queensland state election. On 10 February 2017, Furner was appointed to the posts of Minister for Local Government and Minister for Aboriginal and Torres Strait Islander Partnerships in a Cabinet reshuffle announced by Premier Annastacia Palaszczuk.

In December 2017, Furner was sworn in as Queensland's Minister for Agricultural Industry Development and Fisheries. He retained this portfolio following the swearing in of the Third Palaszczuk Ministry in November 2020.

== Personal life ==
Furner was married to Lorraine and they have three children.

== See also ==
- Rudd government (2007–2010)
- Gillard government
- Second Palaszczuk Ministry
- Third Palaszczuk Ministry

Parliament of Queensland
Preceded by Dale Shuttleworth	Member for Ferny Grove; 2015–present	Incumbent
