= 2007 Australian House of Representatives election =

Australian House of Representatives elections, 2007
- 24 November 2007
- All 150 seats in the Australian House of Representatives; 76 seats needed for a majority
- Turnout: 94.8%
Party	Leader	Vote %	Seats	+/–
Labor	Kevin Rudd	43.4%	83	+23
Liberal	John Howard	36.3%	55	−19
National	Mark Vaile	5.5%	10	−2
This lists parties that won seats. See the complete results below.
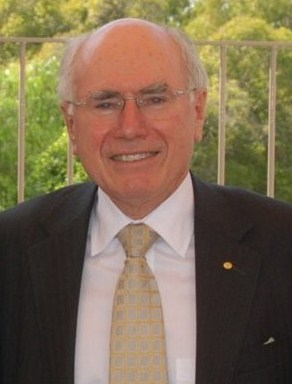

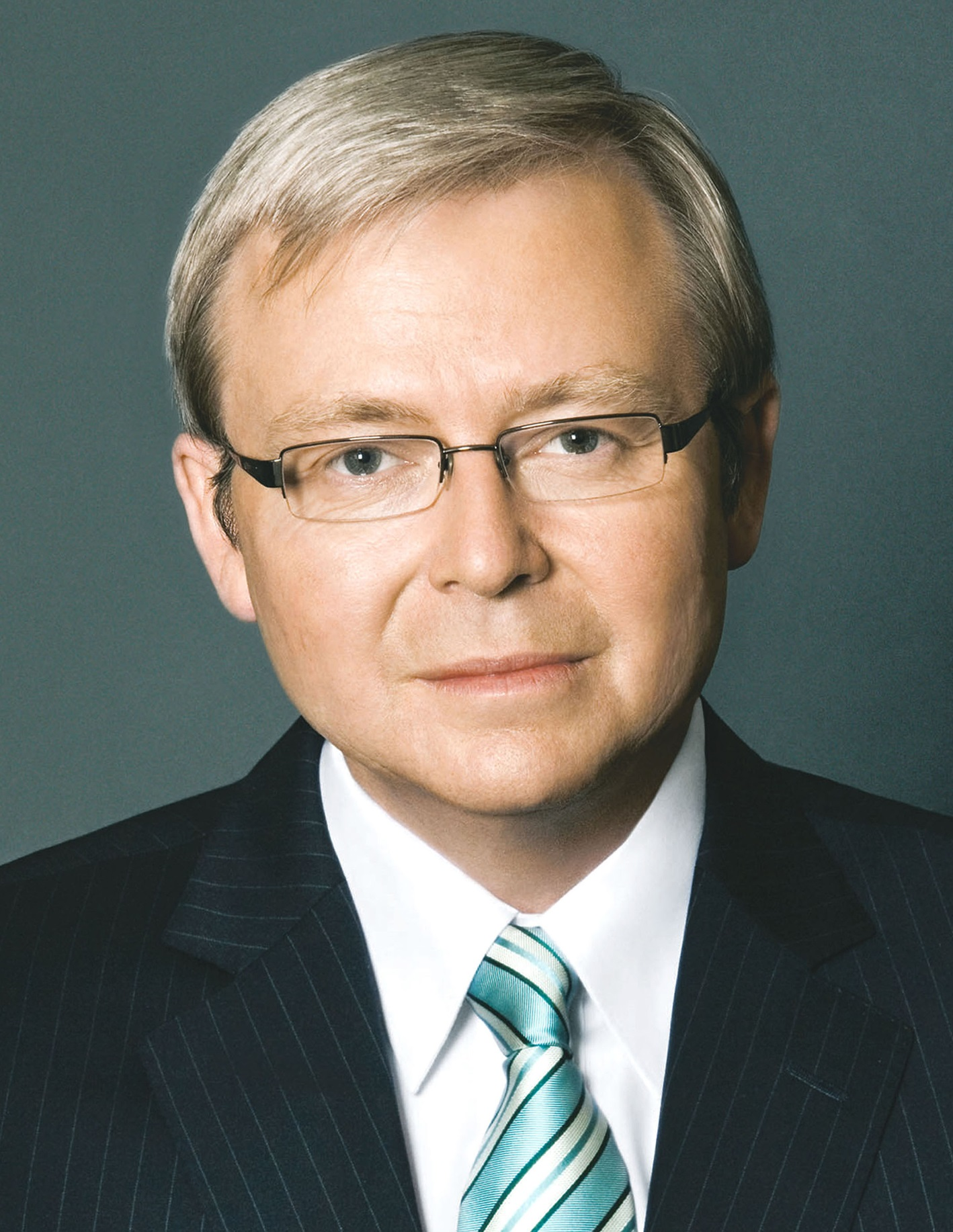
Prime Minister before	Prime Minister after
John Howard; Coalition	Kevin Rudd; Labor

The following tables show state-by-state results in the Australian House of Representatives at the 2007 federal election, 83 Labor, 65 coalition (55 Liberal, 10 National), 2 independent. Detailed results for all 150 seats are also available. The Nationals were reduced to nine seats and the coalition to 64 when independent Rob Oakeshott won the 2008 Lyne by-election.

== Australia ==
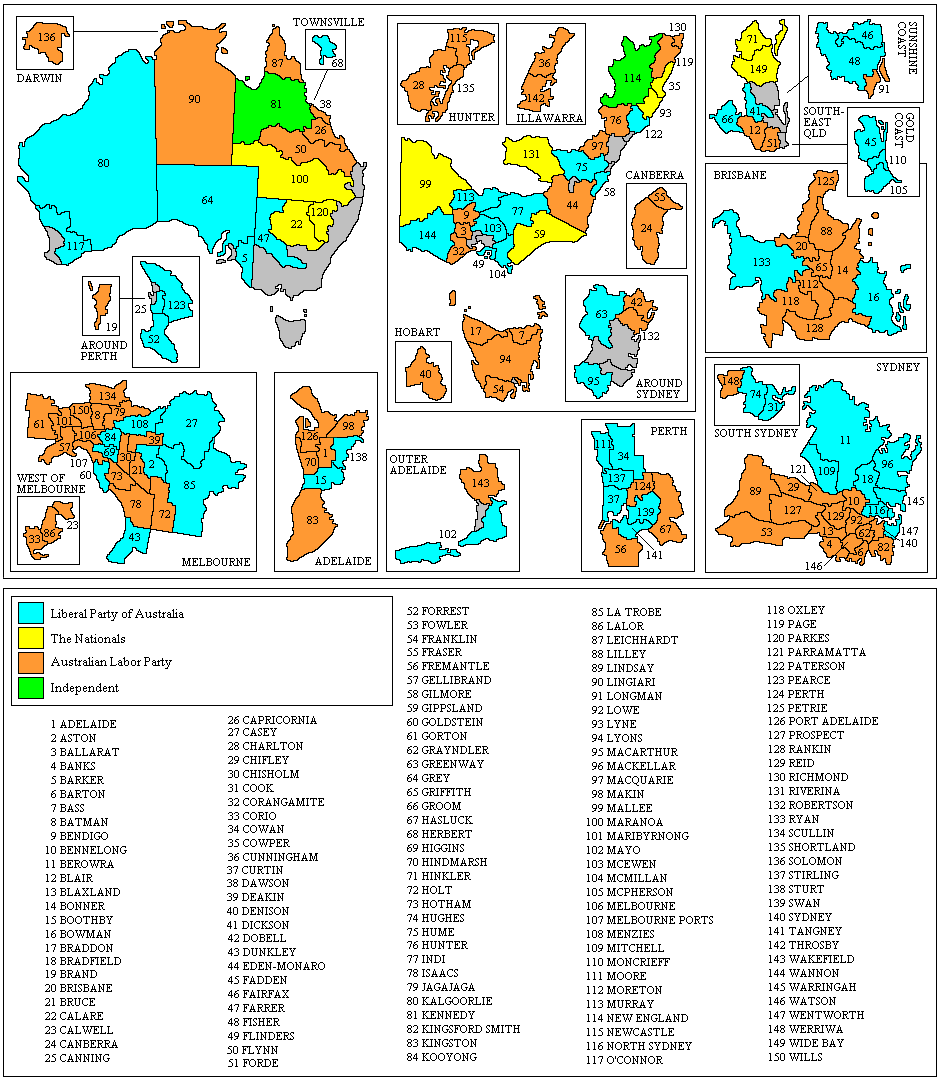
Electoral divisions: Australia

House of Reps (IRV) — Turnout 94.76% (CV) — Informal 3.95%
Party	Votes	%	Swing	Seats	Change
Labor	5,388,147	43.38	+5.74	83	▲23
Liberal	4,506,236	36.28	–4.19	55	▼19
National	682,424	5.49	–0.40	10	▼2
Country Liberal	40,298	0.32	–0.02	0	▼1
Liberal–National coalition	5,228,958	42.09	−4.61	65	▼22
Greens	967,781	7.79	+0.60		
Family First	246,792	1.99	–0.02		
Christian Democrats	104,705	0.84	+0.22		
Democrats	89,810	0.72	–0.51		
One Nation	32,650	0.26	–0.93		
Citizens Electoral Council	27,879	0.22	–0.14		
Liberty and Democracy Party	17,041	0.14	+0.14		
Socialist Alliance	9,973	0.08	–0.04		
Climate Change Coalition	9,470	0.08	+0.08		
Democratic Labor	6,018	0.05	+0.04		
Socialist Equality Party (Note: Unknown if this is the same group that would be known as Socialist Equality Party from 2010 onwards)	4,283	0.03	+0.03		
What Women Want	3,870	0.03	+0.03		
Climate Conservatives	3,239	0.03	+0.03		
Fishing Party	2,083	0.02	+0.00		
Non-Custodial Parents	795	0.01	+0.00		
Independents / Not Affiliated (Note: The independent members were Tony Windsor (New England, NSW) and Bob Katter (Kennedy, Qld). The independent member for Calare, Peter Andren, did not contest the election.)	276,370	2.23	–0.27	2	▼1
Total	12,419,863			150	
Two-party-preferred vote
Labor	6,545,759	52.70	+5.44	83	▲23
Liberal/National coalition	5,874,104	47.30	–5.44	65	▼22
Invalid/blank votes	510,951	3.95	−1.23		
Registered voters/turnout	13,646,539	94.72			
Source: Commonwealth Election 2007

== New South Wales ==
2007 Australian federal election (New South Wales)
- 24 November 2007

All 49 New South Wales seats in the Australian House of Representatives and 6 seats in the Australian Senate
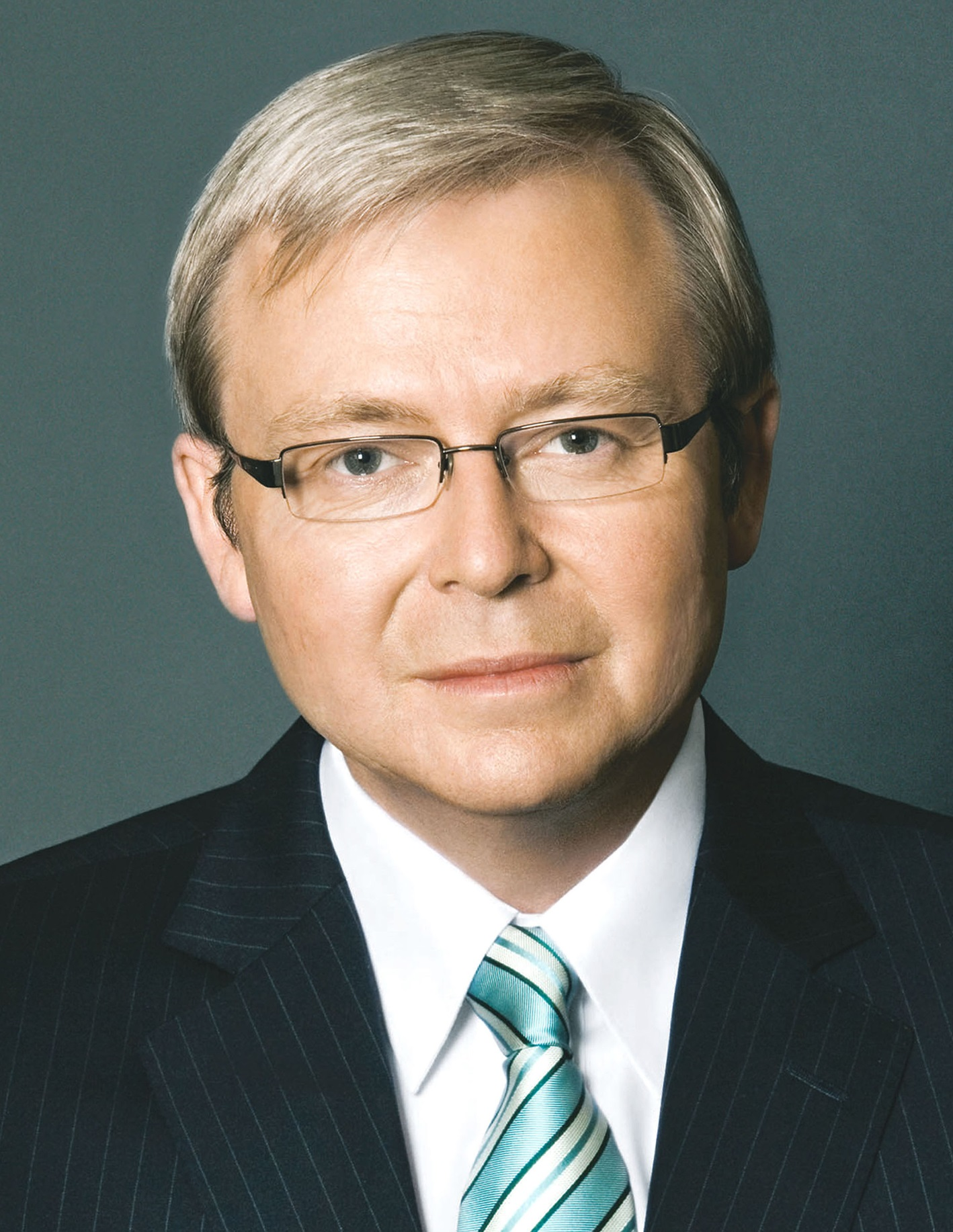

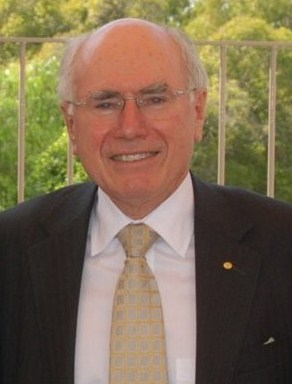
	First party	Second party
Leader	Kevin Rudd	John Howard
Party	Labor	Liberal/National coalition
Last election	21 seats	21 seats
Seats won	28 seats	15 seats
Seat change	▲7	▼6
Percentage	44.12%	40.53%
Swing	▲7.24	▼4.82
TPP	53.68%	46.32%
TPP swing	▲5.61	▼5.61
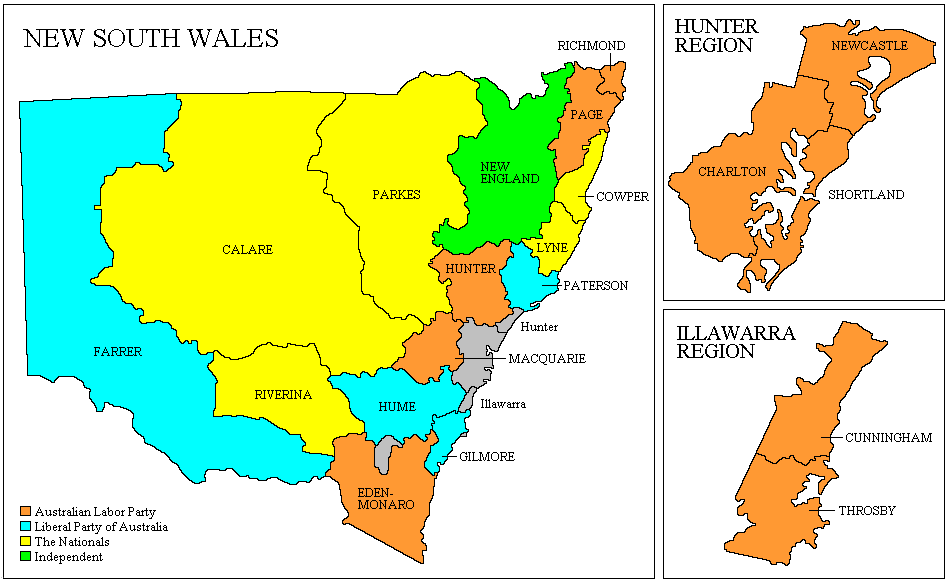
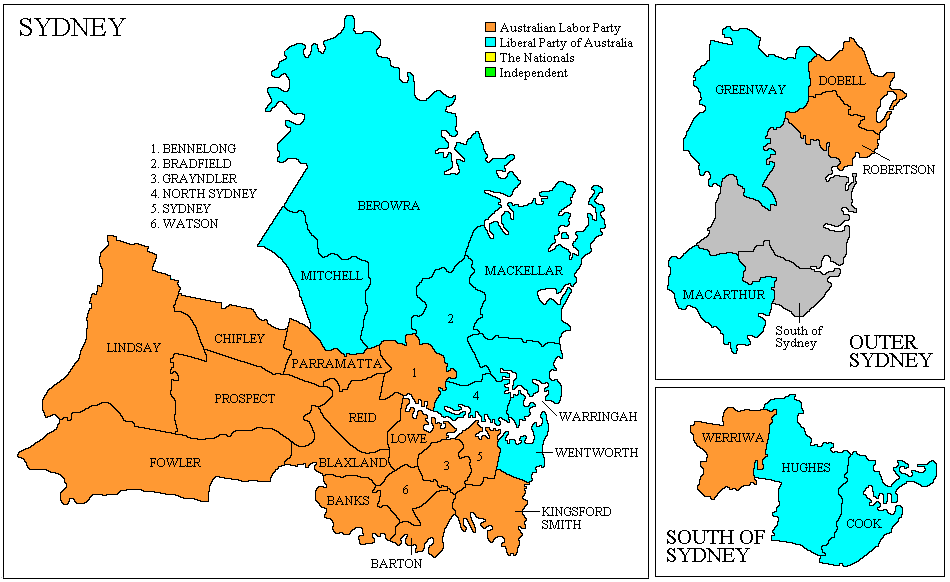

Turnout 94.99% (CV) — Informal 4.95%
Party	Votes	%	Swing	Seats	Change
Labor	1,791,171	44.12	+7.42	28	▲7
Liberal	1,324,311	32.62	–3.54	15	▼6
National	321,182	7.91	–1.28	5	▼1
Liberal–National coalition	1,645,493	40.53	−4.81	20	▼7
Greens	320,031	7.88	–0.21		
Christian Democrats	77,903	1.92	+0.70		
Family First Party	35,469	0.87	+0.10		
Australian Democrats	11,106	0.27	–0.80		
Climate Change Coalition	9,470	0.23	+0.23		
Citizens Electoral Council	9,045	0.22	–0.08		
One Nation	8,426	0.21	–1.19		
Liberty and Democracy Party	4,906	0.12	+0.12		
Socialist Alliance	3,970	0.10	–0.01		
Socialist Equality Party (Note: Unknown if this is the same group that would be known as Socialist Equality Party from 2010 onwards)	3,435	0.08	+0.08		
Climate Conservatives	2,074	0.05	+0.05		
The Fishing Party	1,073	0.03	–0.04		
Non-Custodial Parents Party	795	0.02	–0.01		
Independents	134,424	3.31	–0.69	1	▼1
Not Affiliated	695	0.02	–0.02		
Total	4,059,486			49	▼1
Two-party-preferred vote
Labor	2,179,029	53.68	+5.61	28	▲7
Liberal/National coalition	1,880,457	46.32	–5.61	20	▼7
Invalid/blank votes	211,519	4.95	−1.17		
Registered voters/turnout	4,496,208	94.99			
Source: Commonwealth Election 2007

Independents: Tony Windsor

Liberal to Labor: Bennelong, Dobell, Eden-Monaro, Lindsay, Parramatta (notional), Robertson

National to Labor: Page

Independent to National: Calare

Gwydir (National) was abolished in the last redistribution. Liberal-held Macquarie, a notionally Labor seat, was also won by the Labor Party.

== Victoria ==
2007 Australian federal election (Victoria)
- 24 November 2007

All 37 Victorian seats in the Australian House of Representatives and 6 seats in the Australian Senate
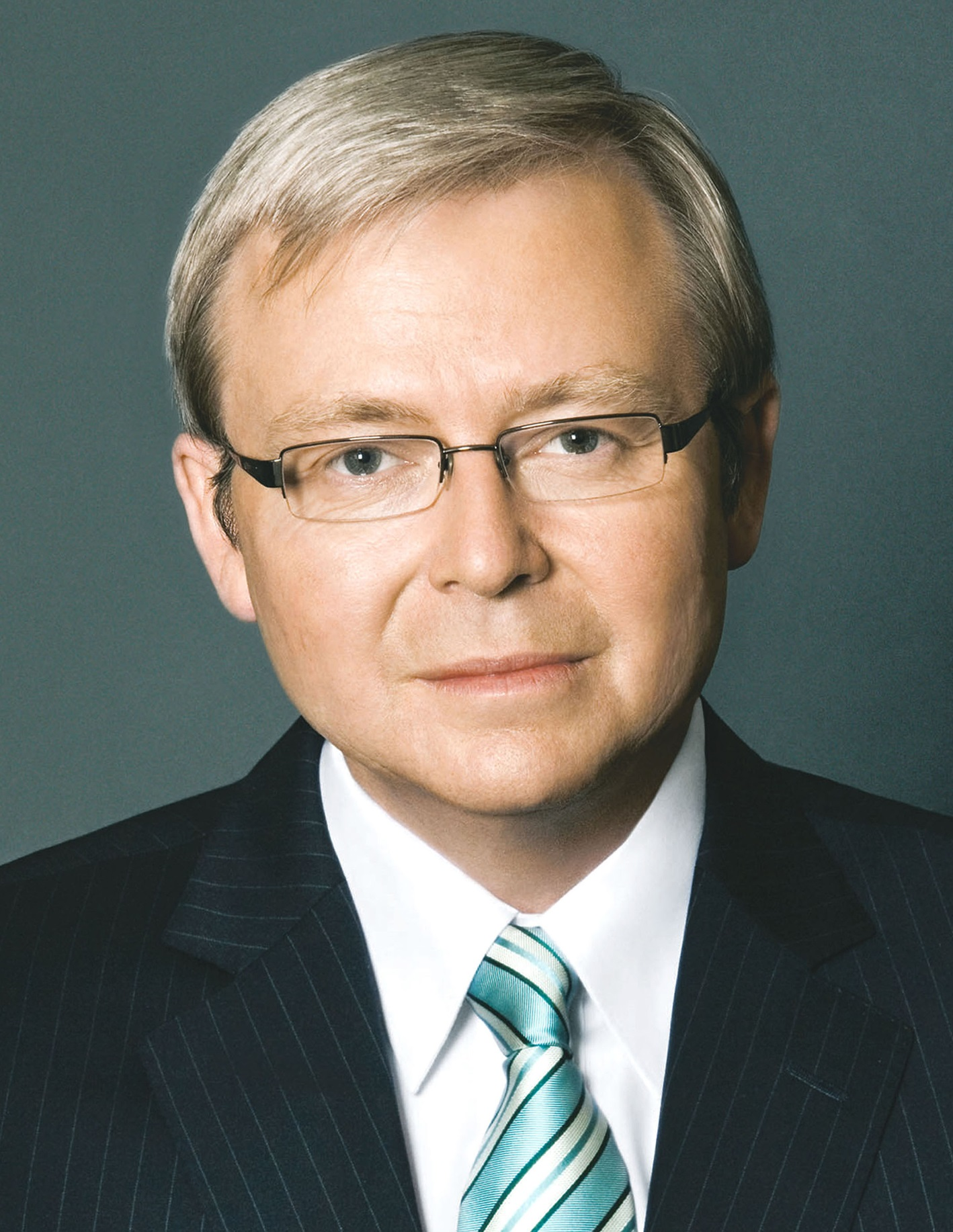

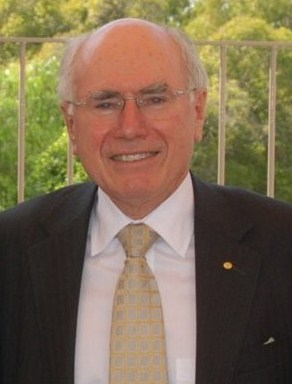
	First party	Second party
Leader	Kevin Rudd	John Howard
Party	Labor	Liberal/National coalition
Last election	19 seats	18 seats
Seats won	21 seats	16 seats
Seat change	▲2	▼2
Percentage	44.69%	41.11%
Swing	▲4.24	▼5.64
TPP	54.27%	45.73%
TPP swing	▲5.27	▼5.27
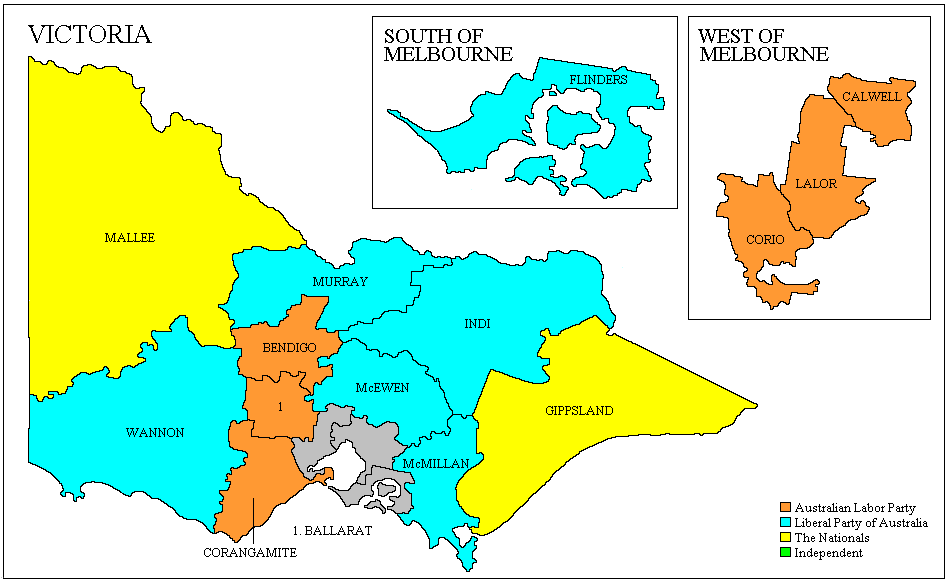
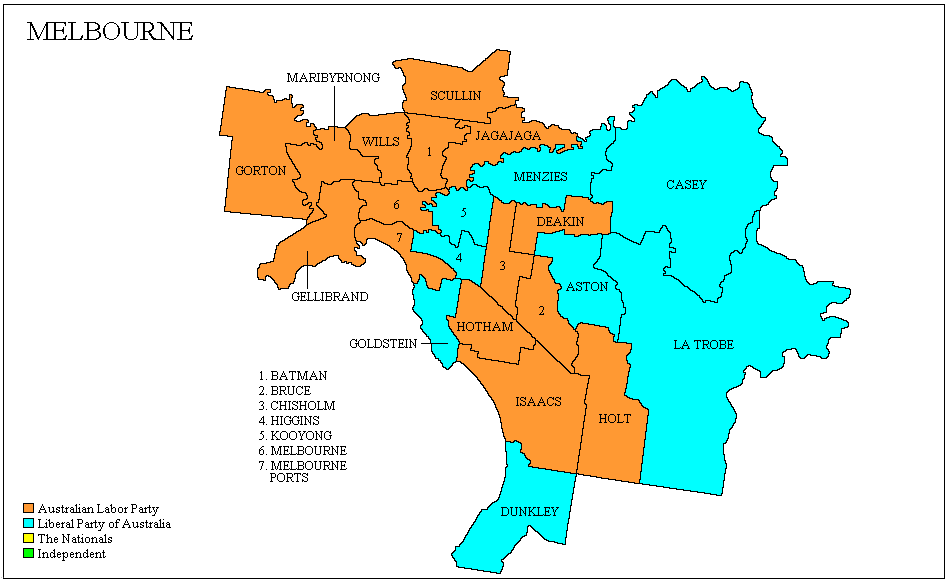

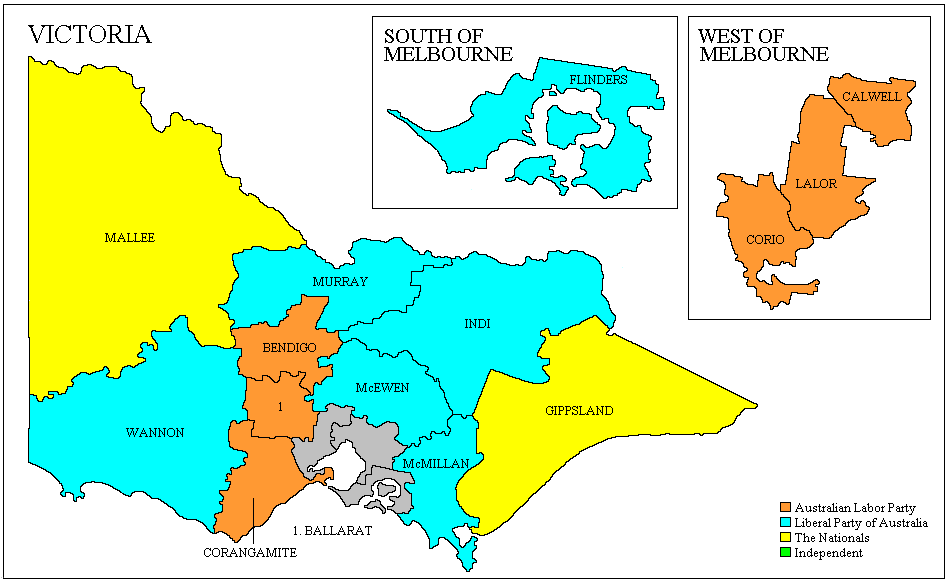
Electoral divisions: Victoria

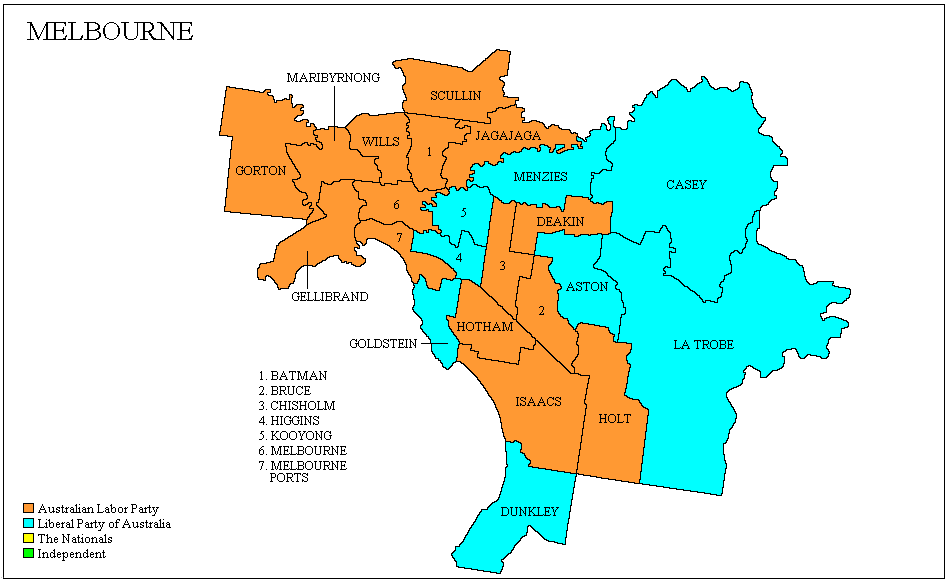
Electoral divisions: Melbourne area

Turnout 95.17% (CV) — Informal 3.26%
Party	Votes	%	Swing	Seats	Change
Labor	1,416,215	44.69	+4.24	21	▲2
Liberal	1,206,926	38.09	–5.15	14	▼2
National	95,859	3.02	–0.49	2	Steady
Liberal–National coalition	1,302,785	41.11	−5.64	16	▼2
Greens	258,846	8.17	+0.72		
Family First	95,663	3.02	+0.64		
Democrats	38,814	1.22	+0.15		
Citizens Electoral Council	8,656	0.27	–0.20		
Democratic Labor	6,018	0.19	+0.14		
Liberty and Democracy Party	3,280	0.10	+0.10		
Socialist Alliance	2,290	0.07	–0.05		
What Women Want	1,825	0.06	+0.06		
Christian Democrats	1,211	0.04	+0.02		
Socialist Equality Party (Note: Unknown if this is the same group that would be known as Socialist Equality Party from 2010 onwards)	691	0.02	+0.02		
One Nation	433	0.01	–0.13		
Independents	31,645	1.00	+0.00		
Not Affiliated	539	0.02	–0.05		
Total	3,168,899			37	
Two-party-preferred vote
Labor	1,719,749	54.27	+5.27	21	▲2
Liberal/National coalition	1,449,150	45.73	–5.27	16	▼2
Invalid/blank votes	106,721	3.26	−0.84		
Registered voters/turnout	3,441,822	95.17			
Source: Commonwealth Election 2007

Liberal to Labor: Corangamite, Deakin.

== Queensland ==
2007 Australian federal election (Queensland)
- 24 November 2007

All 29 Queensland seats in the Australian House of Representatives and 6 seats in the Australian Senate
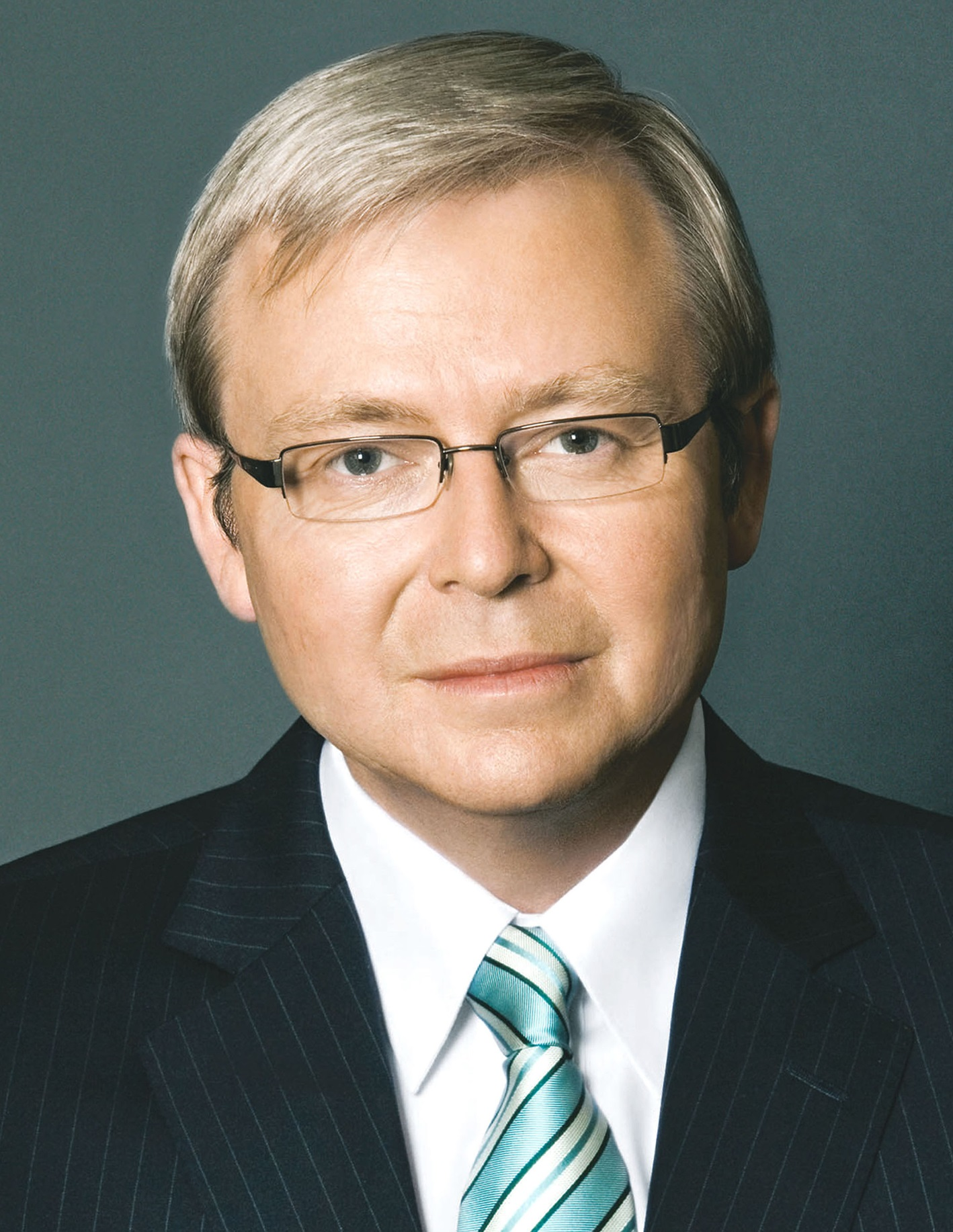

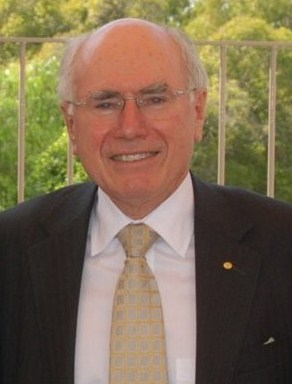
	First party	Second party
Leader	Kevin Rudd	John Howard
Party	Labor	Liberal/National coalition
Last election	6 seats	21 seats
Seats won	15 seats	13 seats
Seat change	▲9	▼8
Percentage	42.91%	44.47%
Swing	▲8.13	▼5.33
TPP	50.44%	49.56%
TPP swing	▲7.53	▼7.53
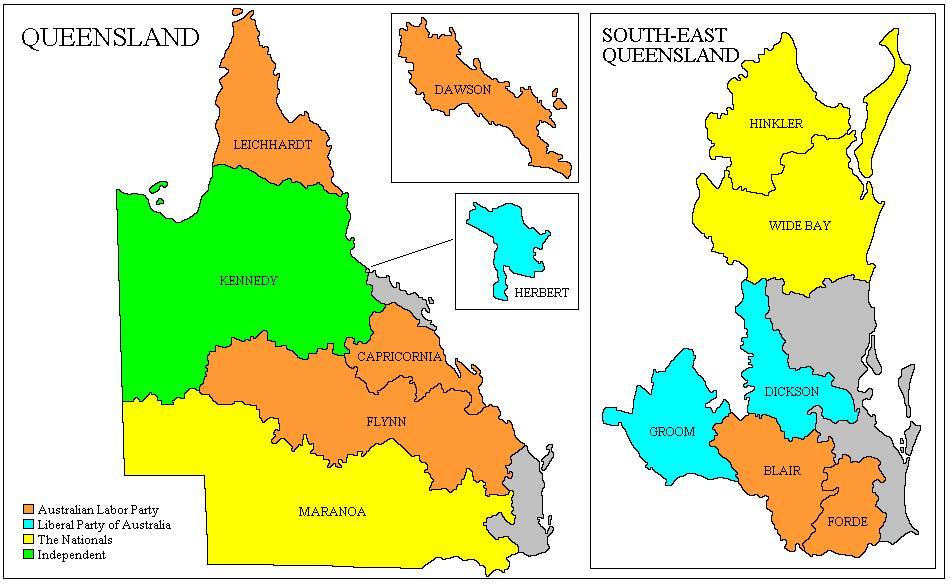
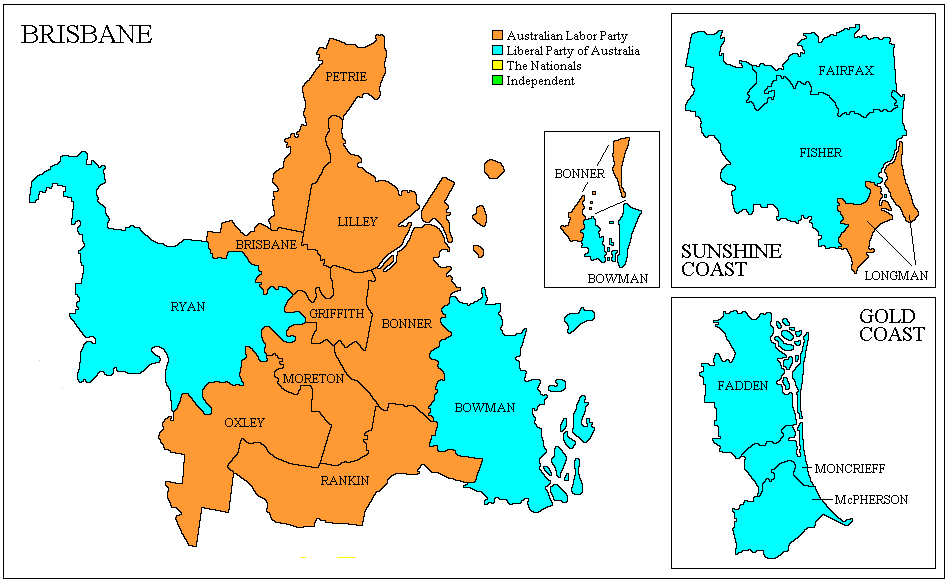

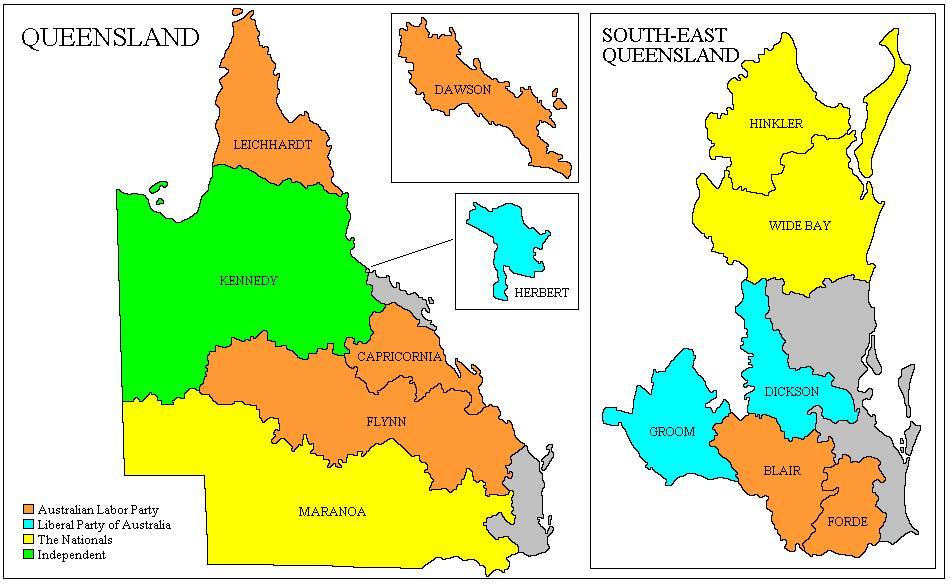
Electoral divisions: Queensland

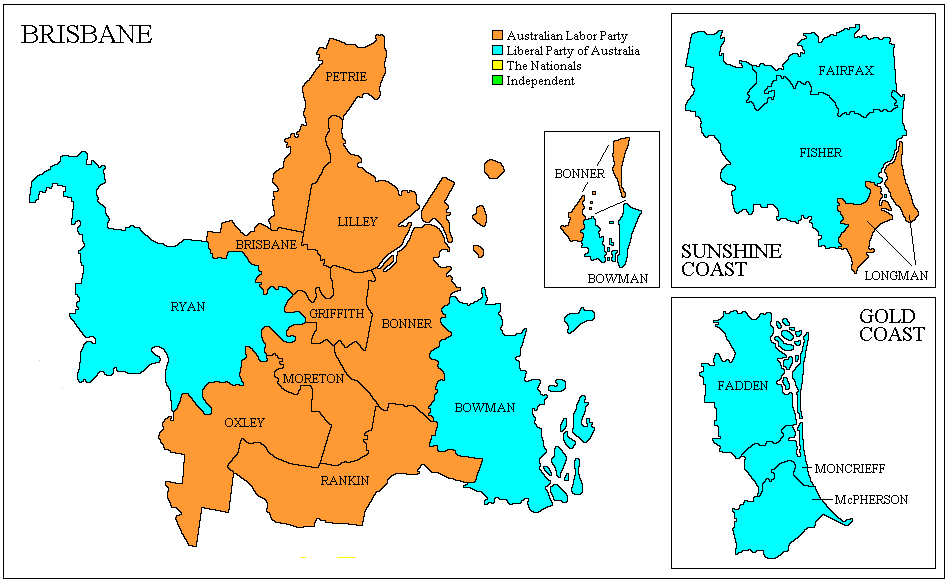
Electoral divisions: Brisbane area

Turnout 94.41% (CV) — Informal 3.56%
Party	Votes	%	Swing	Seats	Change
Labor	1,020,665	42.91	+8.13	15	▲9
Liberal	818,438	34.40	–5.01	10	▼7
National	239,504	10.07	+0.32	3	▼1
Liberal–National coalition	1,057,942	44.47	−4.68	13	▼8
Australian Greens	133,938	5.63	+0.57		
Family First	54,058	2.27	–1.40		
Democrats	22,427	0.94	–0.43		
One Nation	8,619	0.36	–1.62		
Citizens Electoral Council	3,668	0.15	–0.21		
Liberty and Democracy Party	3,531	0.15	+0.15		
Socialist Alliance	1,174	0.05	–0.01		
Fishing Party	1,010	0.04	+0.04		
Christian Democrats	753	0.03	+0.03		
Independents	71,068	2.99	–0.20	1	
Total	2,378,853			29	▲1
Two-party-preferred vote
Labor	1,199,917	50.44	+7.53	15	▲9
Liberal/National coalition	1,178,936	49.56	–7.53	13	▼8
Invalid/blank votes	87,708	3.56	−1.60		
Registered voters/turnout	2,612,504	94.41			
Source: Commonwealth Election 2007

Independents: Bob Katter

Liberal to Labor: Blair, Bonner, Forde, Leichhardt, Longman, Moreton, Petrie

National to Labor: Flynn (notional), Dawson.

== Western Australia ==
2007 Australian federal election (Western Australia)
- 24 November 2007

All 15 Western Australian seats in the Australian House of Representatives and 6 seats in the Australian Senate
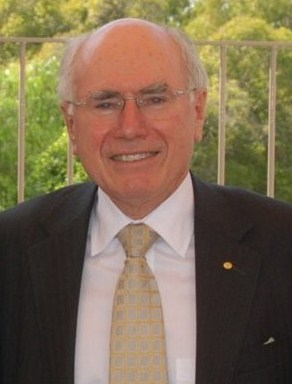

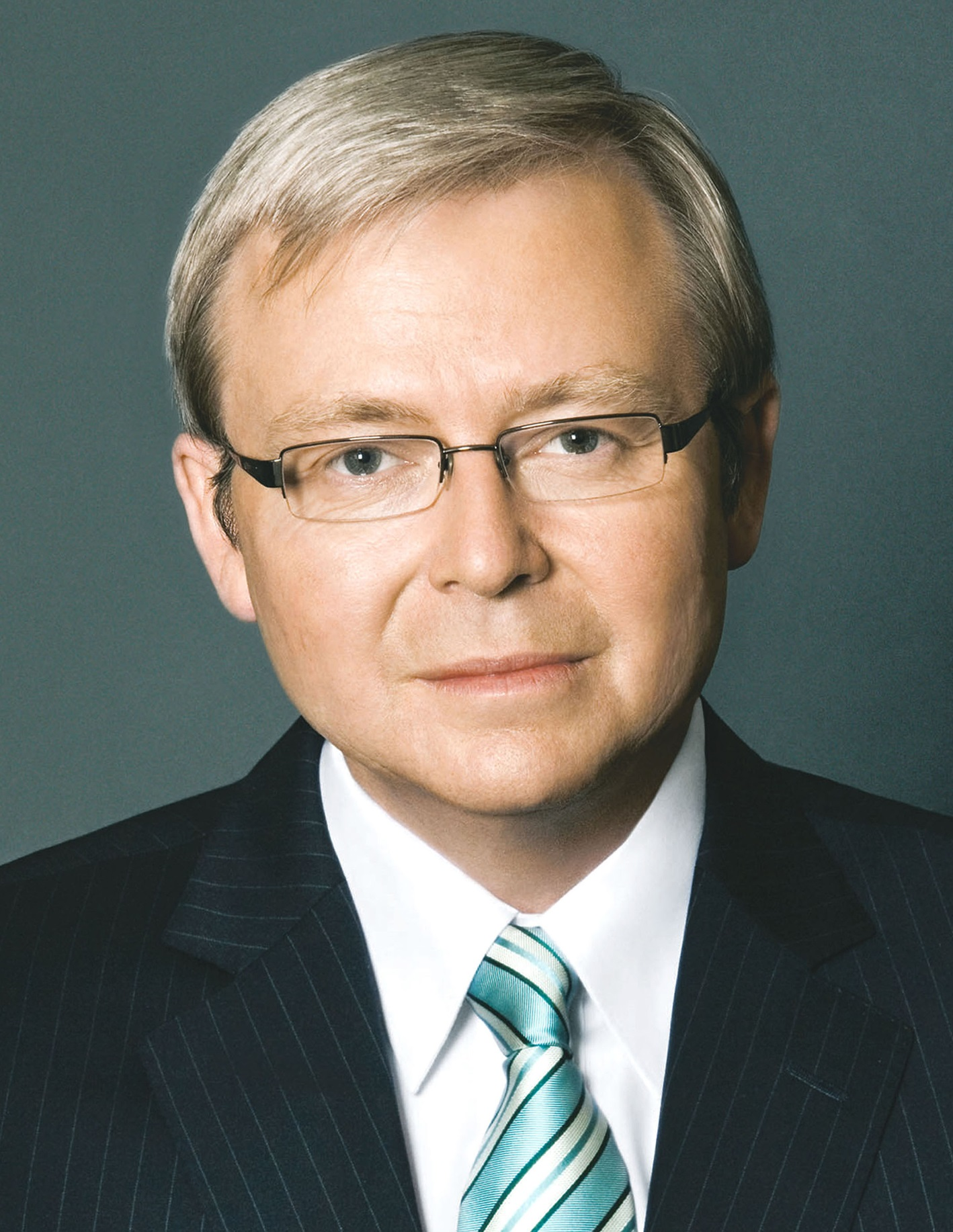
	First party	Second party
Leader	John Howard	Kevin Rudd
Party	Liberal/National coalition	Labor
Last election	10 seats	5 seats
Seats won	11 seats	4 seats
Seat change	▲1	▼1
Percentage	47.45%	36.80%
Swing	▼1.24	▲2.05
TPP	53.26%	46.74%
TPP swing	▼2.14	▲2.14
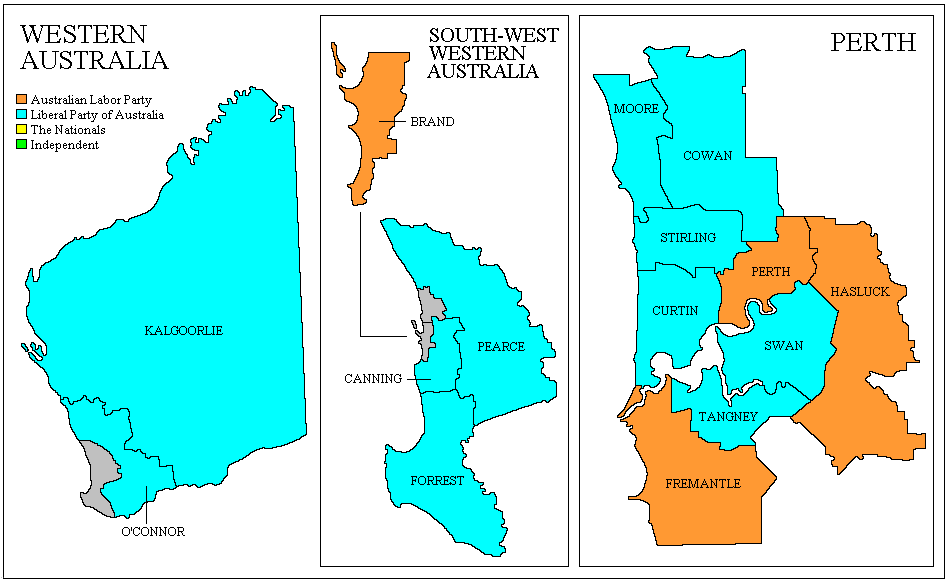
- Electoral divisions: Western Australia

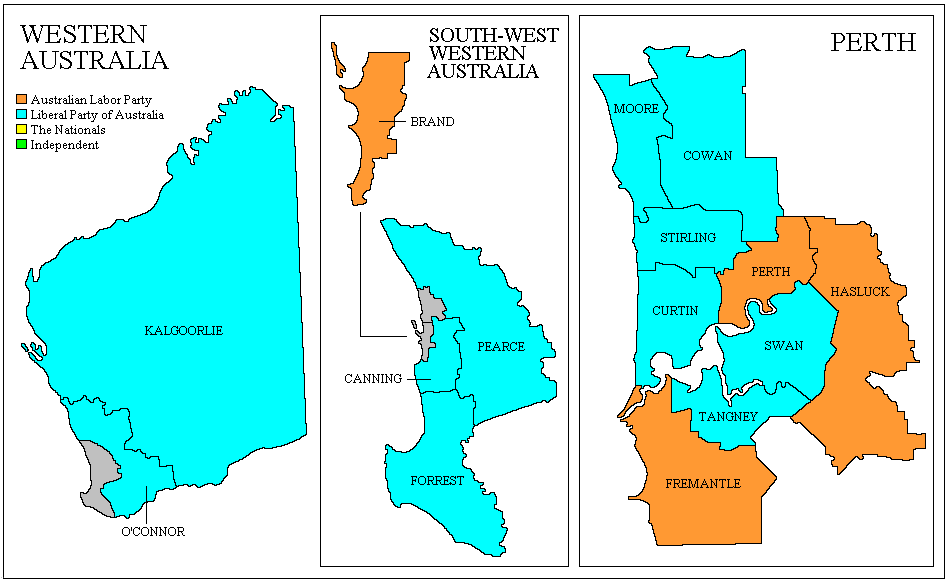
Electoral divisions: Western Australia

Turnout 93.26% (CV) — Informal 3.85%
Party	Votes	%	Swing	Seats	Change
Liberal	545,365	46.31	–1.82	11	▲1
Labor	433,342	36.80	+2.05	4	▼1
Greens	105,106	8.93	+1.26		
Christian Democrats	24,838	2.11	–0.14		
Family First	14,215	1.21	+0.97		
One Nation	13,529	1.15	–1.37		
National	13,459	1.14	+0.58		
Citizens Electoral Council	3,115	0.26	–0.34		
Liberty and Democracy Party	2,730	0.23	+0.23		
Socialist Alliance	1,141	0.10	–0.05		
What Women Want	590	0.05	+0.05		
Socialist Equality Party (Note: Unknown if this is the same group that would be known as Socialist Equality Party from 2010 onwards)	157	0.01	+0.01		
Independents	19,950	1.69	+0.34		
Total	1,177,537			15	
Two-party-preferred vote
Liberal	627,211	53.26	–2.14	11	▲1
Labor	550,326	46.74	+2.14	4	▼1
Invalid/blank votes		47,152	3.85	−1.47	
Registered voters/turnout		1,313,201	93.26		
Source: Commonwealth Election 2007

Labor to Liberal: Cowan, Swan

Liberal to Labor: Hasluck.

== South Australia ==
2007 Australian federal election (South Australia)
- 24 November 2007

All 11 South Australian seats in the Australian House of Representatives and 6 seats in the Australian Senate
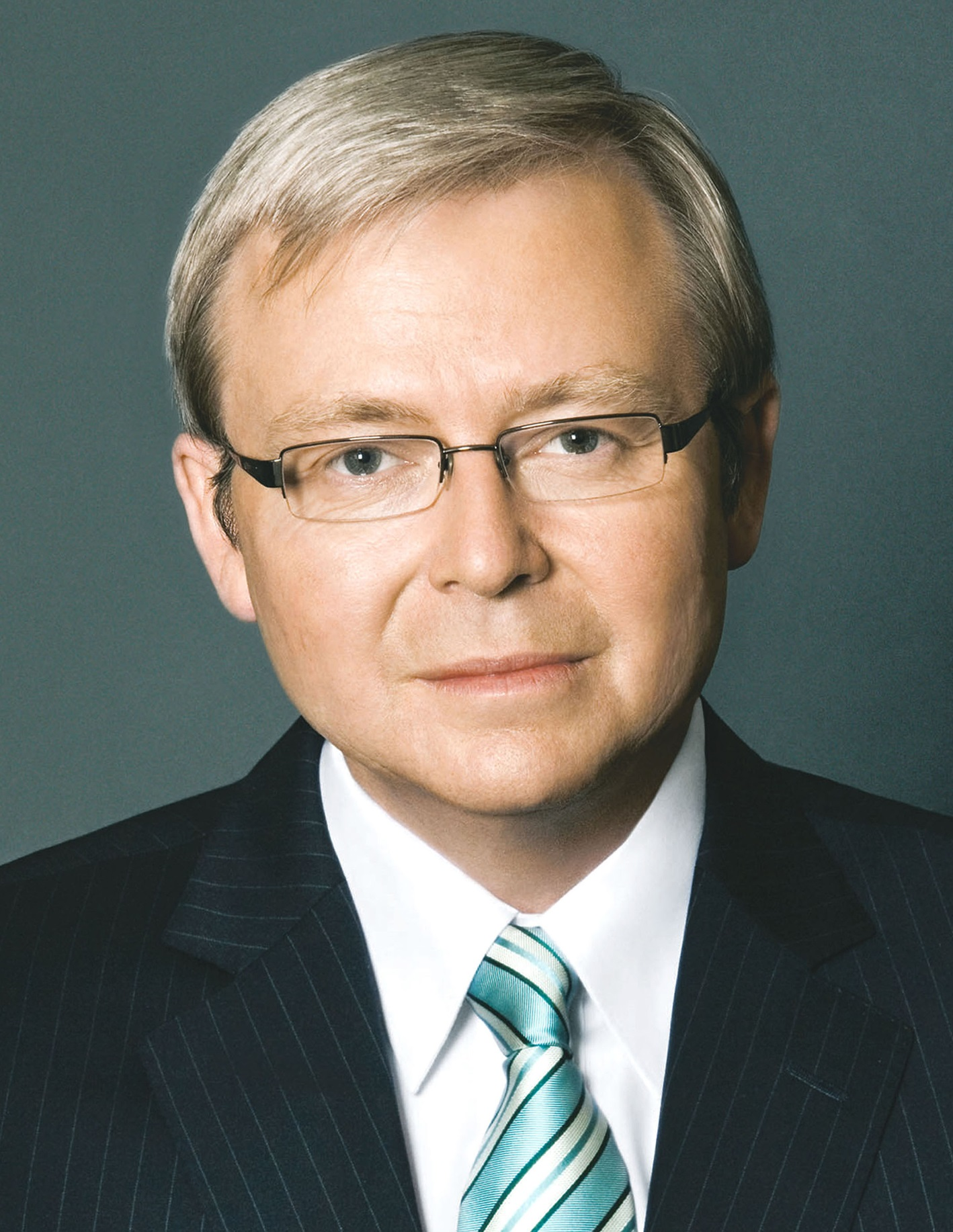

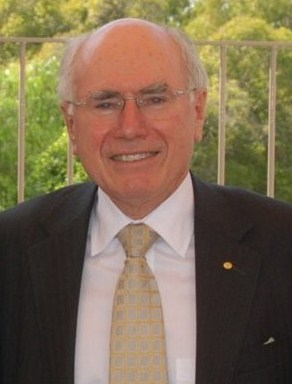
	First party	Second party
Leader	Kevin Rudd	John Howard
Party	Labor	Liberal/National coalition
Last election	3 seats	8 seats
Seats won	6 seats	5 seats
Seat change	▲3	▼3
Percentage	43.18%	43.02%
Swing	▲6.43	▼5.40
TPP	52.40%	47.60%
TPP swing	▲6.76	▼6.76
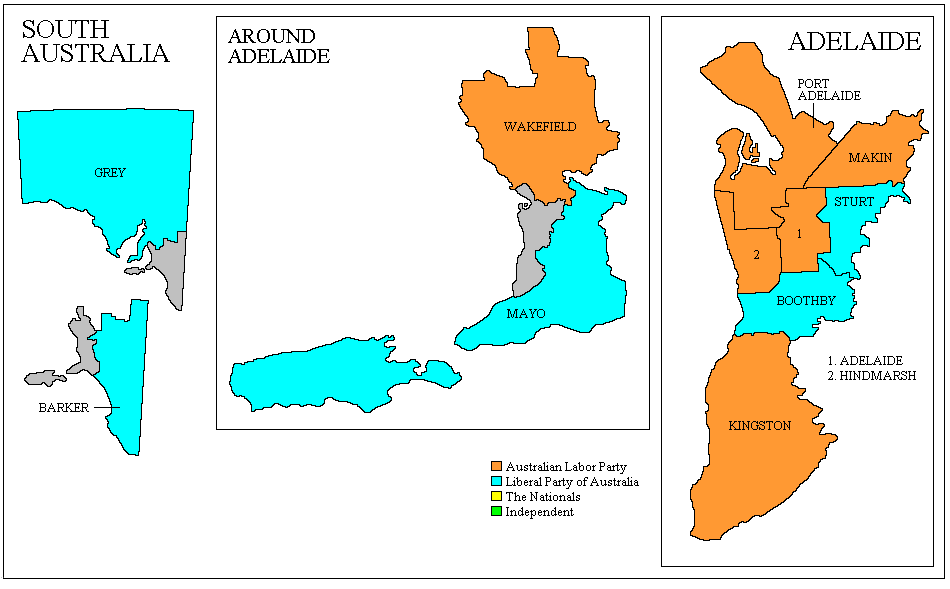
- Electoral divisions: South Australia

Turnout 95.42% (CV) — Informal 3.78%
Party	Votes	%	Swing	Seats	Change
Labor	426,639	43.18	+6.43	6	▲3
Liberal	412,621	41.76	–5.64	5	▼3
National	12,420	1.26	+0.24	0	Steady
Liberal–National coalition	425,041	43.01	−5.41	5	▼3
Greens	68,640	6.95	+1.51		
Family First	40,031	4.05	–0.26		
Democrats	14,957	1.51	–0.37		
One Nation	1,643	0.17	–0.96		
Liberty and Democracy Party	1,637	0.17	+0.17		
What Women Want	1,455	0.15	+0.15		
Climate Conservatives	1,165	0.12	+0.12		
Independents	6,944	0.70	–1.34		
Total	988,152			11	
Two-party-preferred vote
Labor	517,818	52.40	+6.76	6	▲3
Liberal	470,334	47.60	–6.76	5	▼3
Invalid/blank votes	38,830	3.78	−1.78		
Registered voters/turnout	1,076,220	95.42			
Source: Commonwealth Election 2007

Liberal to Labor: Kingston, Makin, Wakefield.

== Tasmania ==
2007 Australian federal election (Tasmania)
- 24 November 2007

All 5 Tasmanian seats in the Australian House of Representatives and 6 seats in the Australian Senate
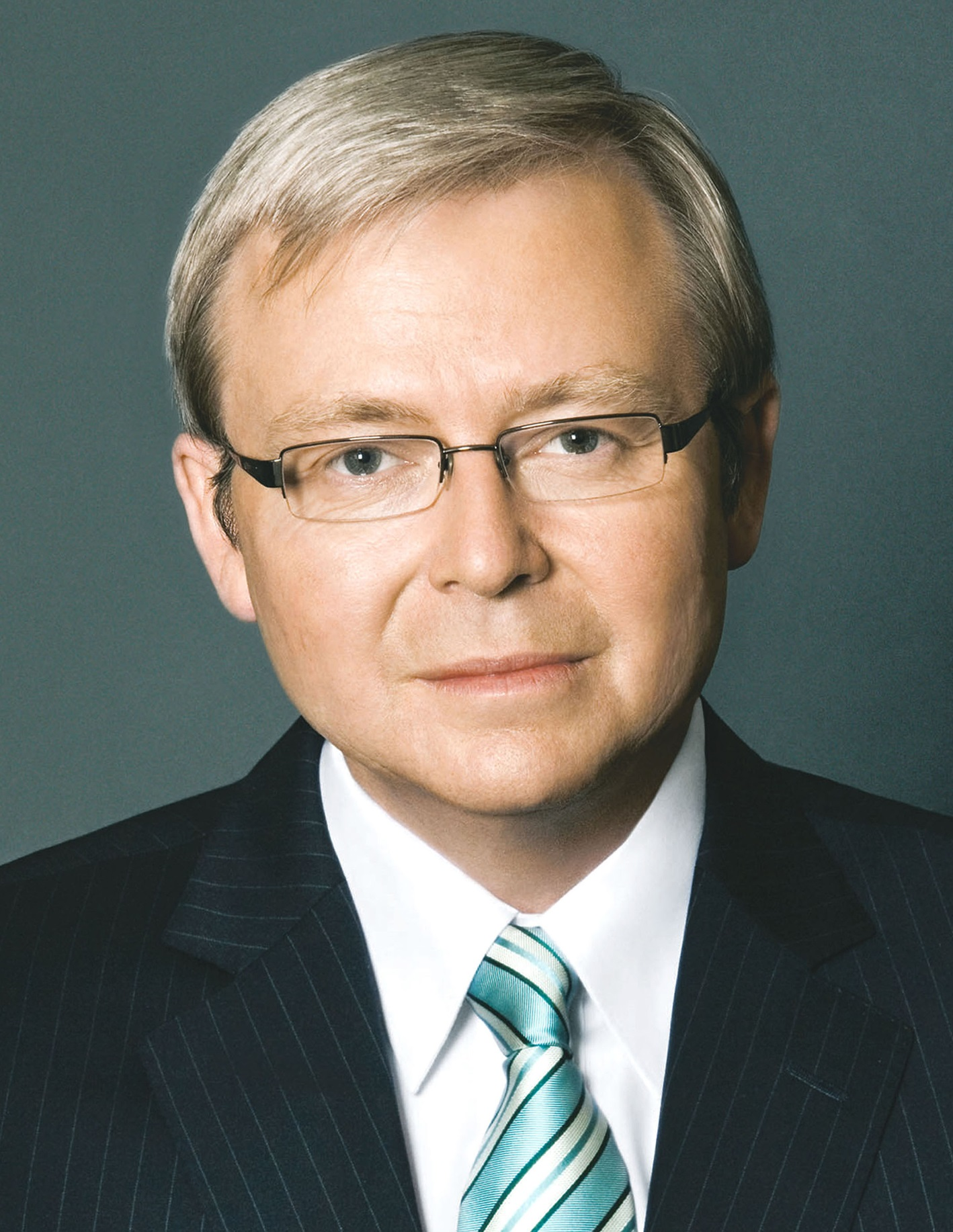

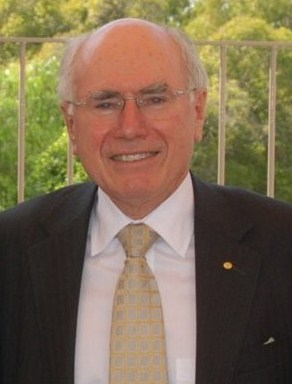
	First party	Second party
Leader	Kevin Rudd	John Howard
Party	Labor	Liberal/National coalition
Last election	3 seats	2 seats
Seats won	5 seats	0 seats
Seat change	▲2	▼2
Percentage	42.77%	38.22%
Swing	▼1.81	▼3.76
TPP	56.21%	43.79%
TPP swing	▲2.02	▼2.02
- Results by electorate

Turnout 95.76% (CV) — Informal 2.92%
Party	Votes	%	Swing	Seats	Change
Labor	139,077	42.77	–1.81	5	▲2
Liberal	124,280	38.22	–3.76	0	▼2
Greens	43,893	13.50	+3.62		
Family First	7,356	2.26	–0.58		
Citizens Electoral Council	1,856	0.57	+0.20		
Socialist Alliance	859	0.26	–0.09		
Liberty and Democracy Party	606	0.19	+0.19		
Independents	7,215	2.22	+2.22		
Total	325,142			5	
Two-party-preferred vote
Labor	182,757	56.21	+2.02	5	▲2
Liberal	142,385	43.79	–2.02	0	▼2
Invalid/blank votes		9,796	2.92	−0.67	
Registered voters/turnout		349,753	95.76		
Source: Commonwealth Election 2007

Liberal to Labor: Bass, Braddon.

== Territories ==
=== Australian Capital Territory ===
2007 Australian federal election (Australian Capital Territory)
- 24 November 2007

All 2 Australian Capital Territory seats in the Australian House of Representatives and all 2 seats in the Australian Senate
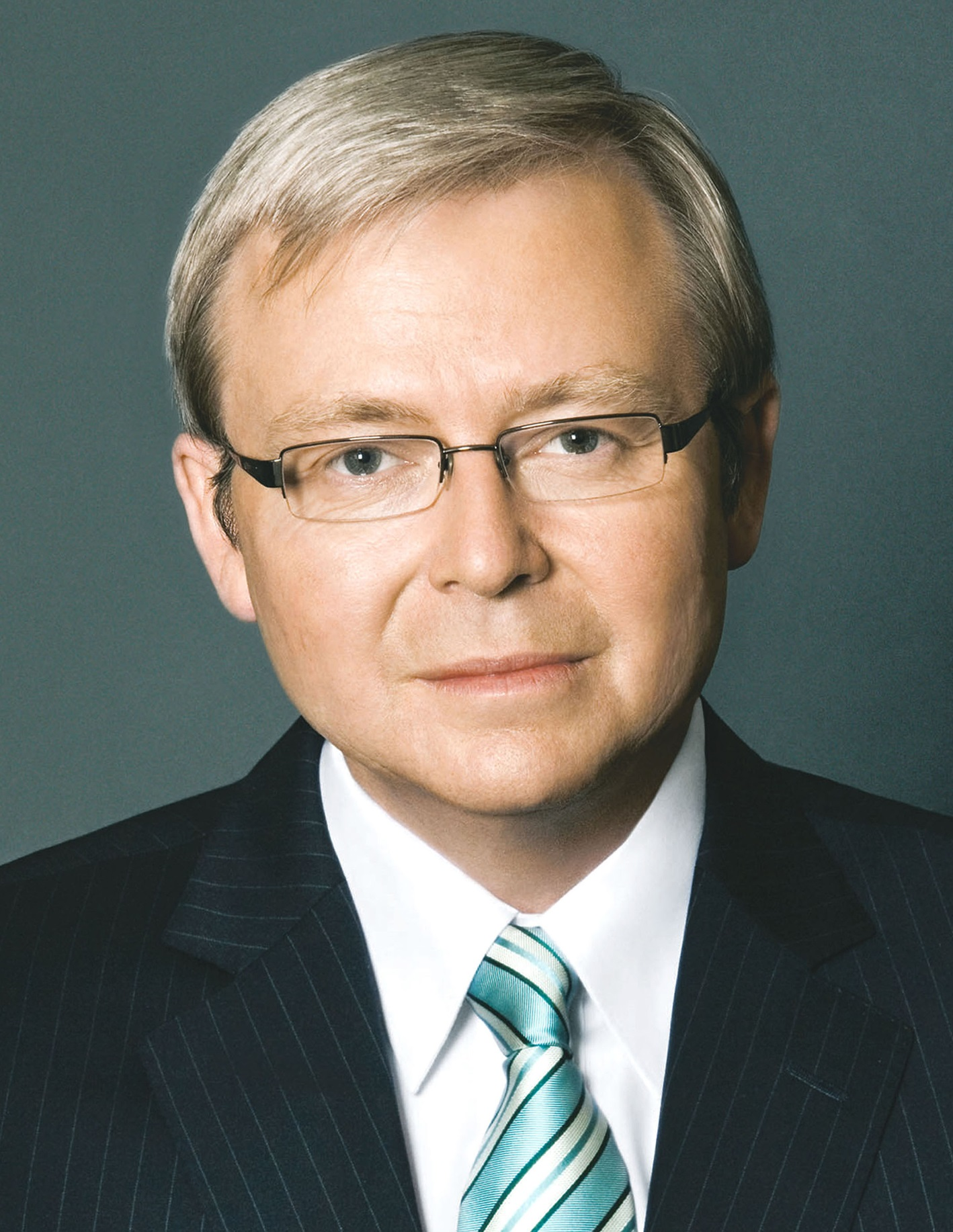

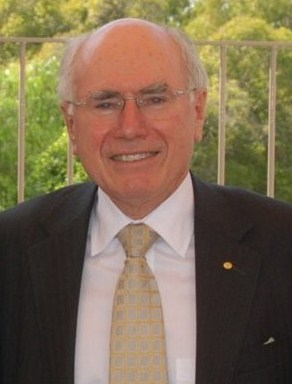
	First party	Second party
Leader	Kevin Rudd	John Howard
Party	Labor	Liberal/National coalition
Last election	2 seats	0 seats
Seats won	2	0
Seat change	Steady	Steady
Percentage	51.10%	33.23%
Swing	▲2.05	▼2.00
TPP	63.40%	36.60%
TPP swing	▲1.86	▼1.86

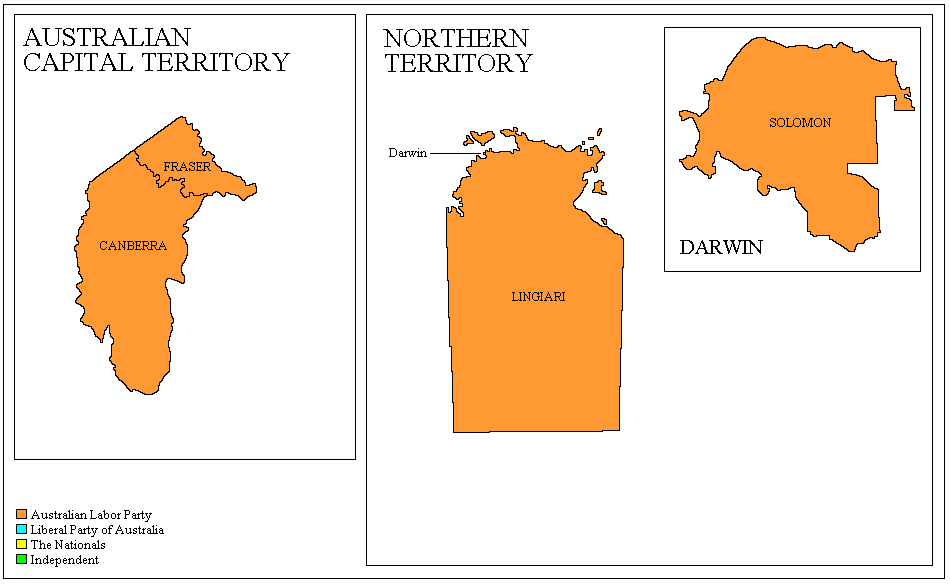
Electoral divisions: Australian Capital Territory (ACT) and the Northern Territory

Turnout 95.85% (CV) — Informal 2.31%
Party	Votes	%	Swing	Seats	Change
Labor	114,244	51.10	+0.85	2	Steady
Liberal	74,295	33.23	–2.00	0	Steady
Australian Greens	29,424	13.16	+2.40		
Australian Democrats	2,509	1.12	–1.28		
Citizens Electoral Council	1,295	0.58	+0.21		
Socialist Alliance	539	0.24	–0.75		
Independents	1,275	0.57	+0.57		
Total	223,581			2	
Two-party-preferred vote
Labor	141,745	63.40	+1.86	2	Steady
Liberal	81,836	36.60	–1.86	0	Steady
Invalid/blank votes		5,289	2.31	−1.13	
Registered voters/turnout		238,786	95.85		
Source: Commonwealth Election 2007

=== Northern Territory ===
2007 Australian federal election (Northern Territory)
- 24 November 2007

All 2 Northern Territory seats in the Australian House of Representatives and all 2 seats in the Australian Senate
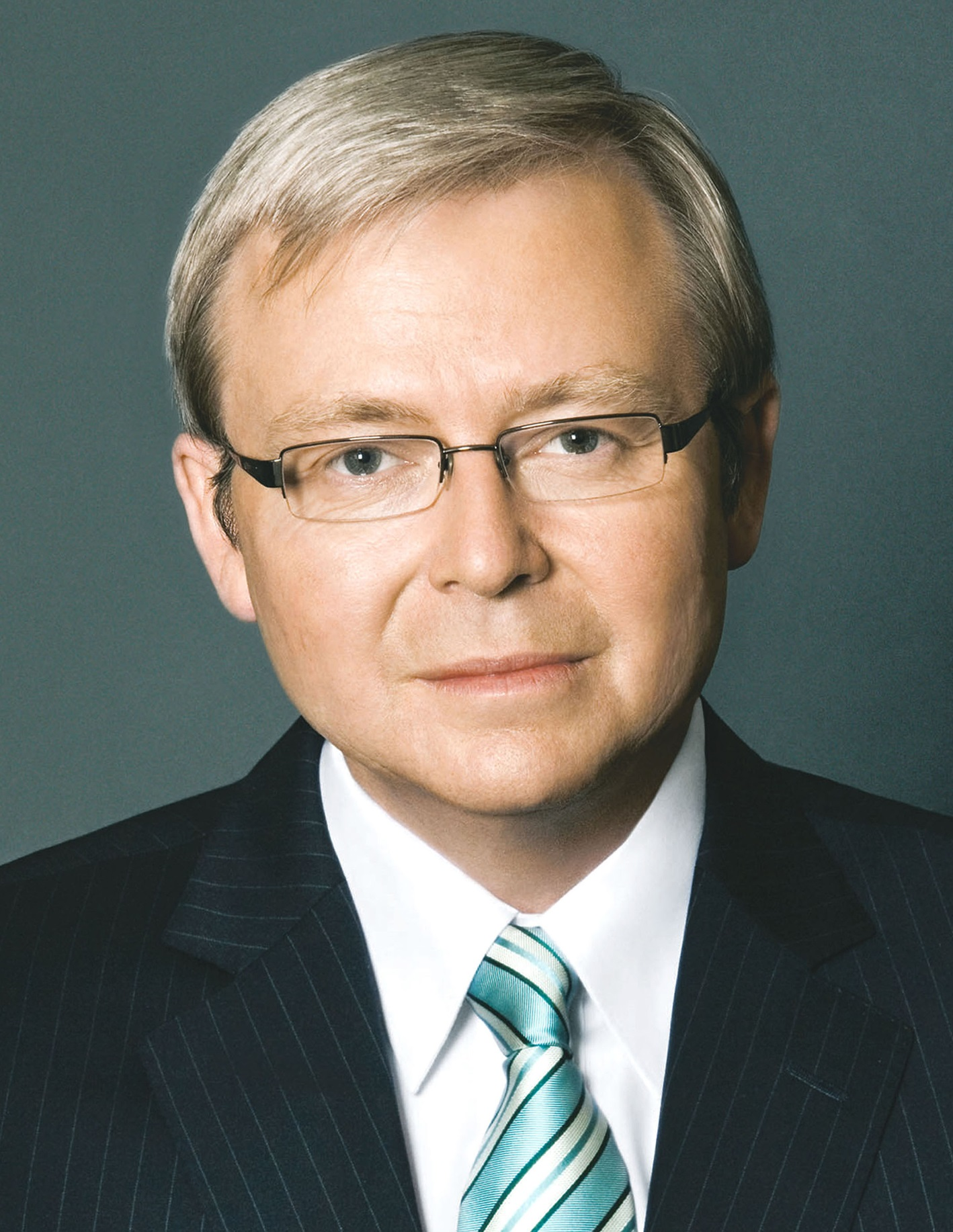

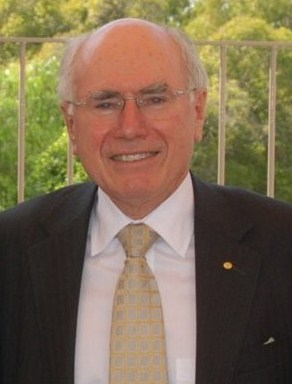
	First party	Second party
Leader	Kevin Rudd	John Howard
Party	Labor	Liberal/National coalition
Last election	1 seat	1 seat
Seats won	2	0
Seat change	▲1	▼1
Percentage	47.65%	41.03
Swing	▲3.38	▼2.81
TPP	55.41%	44.59%
TPP swing	▲3.26	▼3.26

Turnout 86.53% (CV) — Informal 3.85%
Party	Votes	%	Swing	Seats	Change
Labor	46,794	47.65	+3.38	2	▲1
Country Liberal	40,298	41.03	–2.81	0	▼1
Greens	7,903	8.05	+1.84		
Liberty and Democracy Party	358	0.36	+0.36		
Citizens Electoral Council	245	0.25	–0.01		
Independents	2,615	2.66	+0.70		
Total	98,213			2	
Two-party-preferred vote
Labor	54,418	55.41	+3.26	2	▲1
Country Liberal	43,795	44.59	–3.26	0	▼1
Invalid/blank votes		3,936	3.85	−0.60	
Registered voters/turnout		118,045	86.53		
Source: Commonwealth Election 2007

CLP to Labor: Solomon.

== See also ==
- Post-election pendulum for the Australian federal election, 2007
- Members of the Australian House of Representatives, 2007–2010
- Results of the Australian federal election, 2007 (Senate)
