= Environmentalists for Nuclear Energy Australia =

- Leader: Richard McNeall
- Founded: 2007
- Dissolved: 2010
- Headquarters: 100 The Crescent; Cheltenham NSW
- Ideology: Environmentalism
- International affiliation: Environmentalists for Nuclear

Website
- http://www.efn.org.au/

Environmentalists for Nuclear Energy Australia, formerly called Conservatives for Climate and Environment, was a political party registered in Australia from 2007 to 2010. EFN-Australia referred to itself as a not-for-profit environmental association, registered as a political party. It was the Australian affiliate of Environmentalists for Nuclear, and the party campaigned unsuccessfully to gain nuclear power in Australia.

== Goals ==
The party's stated objective was to achieve the strongest possible action on climate change, by:

1. promoting acceptance of nuclear energy as a significant part of the solution to climate change;
2. supporting all viable technologies for greenhouse gas abatement;
3. pushing for ambitious emissions reduction targets and timelines, achieved by a strong carbon price signal;
4. endorsing and promoting the election of candidates to the Senate, House of Representatives and/or State Parliaments;
5. having a politically non-partisan agenda, welcoming positive action from all sides.

== History ==
Established in 2007 as Conservatives for Climate and Environment, the organisation was based on support for the economic policies of the governing Liberal and National parties, however with emphasis on the importance of combating climate change. The party focused on environmental policies including the ratification of the Kyoto Protocol and an 80 percent reduction in greenhouse gas emissions by 2050. A small-l liberal approach to social policy was stated, with their website condemning the treatment of Australian terrorism suspect David Hicks. The party supported greater protection for native forests and opposed the Gunns pulp mill in Tasmania, which had the support of both major parties.

== Electoral fortunes ==
In the 2007 federal election the CCE contested three lower House of Representatives seats (Farrer, Gilmore, and Warringah) in New South Wales, and one seat (Mayo) in South Australia, gaining a total of 3,239 votes (0.03%), with results in the 4 lower house seats ranging from 0.46 percent to 1.30 percent. In the upper house, the Senate, CCE contested in three states, New South Wales, Victoria and Western Australia and gained 9,988 votes or 0.08 percent of the national total (between 0.10 percent and 0.13 percent in the three states contested). The CCE vote declined at the 2008 Mayo by-election.

CCE preferenced the Liberal Party, ahead of the Labor Party and The Greens. Despite the CCE favouring the coalition on economic issues, 56 percent of their preferences went to the Labor Party.

In 2009, CCE applied to the Australian Electoral Commission to change its name to "Environmentalists for Nuclear Energy Australia" after becoming an affiliate of Environmentalists for Nuclear. The application was accepted by the AEC. The party was voluntarily deregistered in 2010 after the AEC reviewed their eligibility and found that they did not have the 500 members necessary to be a registered political party. At its height, the party claimed 600 members. Membership decline may have been a result of the change in name and focus. Simon Blake, who had contested the seat of Gilmore on behalf of the party at the 2007 election, was one such resignation.

== See also ==
- Fusion Party (Australia)
- Nuclear power in Australia
- Anti-nuclear movement in Australia
- Climate change in Australia
- Candidates of the Australian federal election 2007
- Results of the 2007 Australian federal election (House of Representatives)
- Results of the 2007 Australian federal election (Senate)
