= Climate Change Coalition =

Australian political party

The Climate Change Coalition (CCC), briefly known as 4Change, was an Australian political party, which was formed in 2007 with a view to accelerate action by politicians from all parties on global warming and climate change. Its position on working towards addressing climate change stressed cooperation with big business in order to achieve significant progress on the issue. The party therefore advocated a close working relationship between environmentalists and the business community. The CCC was registered as a political party with the Australian Electoral Commission (AEC) on 4 September 2007 and deregistered on 25 March 2010.

== 2007 New South Wales state election ==
When it was first conceived and established in 2006, the Climate Change Coalition was not initially a political party, but rather a grouping of independents. The first election that it contested was the New South Wales March 2007 state election. The CCC ran a group of 21 candidates (dubbed by detractors the "Gang of 21", an allusion to the Gang of Four) standing for the Legislative Council, the NSW Upper House of Parliament . Heading this group was Patrice Newell, an author and biodynamic beef farmer. The CCC received criticism from some groups, for refusing to advocate preferences, under the Australian preferential voting system, to other political parties with strong environmental credentials.

The group was not registered as a political party in NSW and so under NSW electoral law could not display a party name on the ballot paper at the top of the group column. The 21 "Group F" candidates polled 18,999 votes in total, or 0.50% of the total formal vote, and were therefore well short of the quota of 173,239 (4.55%) required for election of any candidate.

== 2007 Australian federal election ==
The Climate Change Coalition was registered as a political party by the AEC on 4 September 2007. The party announced it intended to run candidates for the Australian Senate in the 2007 federal election.

The party's NSW Senate candidates were Patrice Newell and Dr Karl Kruszelnicki, a well-known scientist and media personality. The party fielded candidates for the senate in each of the other states with the exception of Tasmania, and also fielded a candidate in the ACT. The candidates were; in Western Australia Gary Warden, and Sarah Bishop; in South Australia, Dr Colin Edean and Vidas Kublilus; in Queensland, Phil Johnson and Steven Posselt; and in Victoria, Ainslie Howard. The ACT senate candidate was Michael Fullam-Stone.

With a favourable ballot paper placement (column E) and with the party's name shown on the ballot paper the party scored 0.83% of the vote in NSW (a 0.33% increase on its NSW state election result) but failed to secure the election of any of its candidates. Results in other states were in the range 0.27% (in Western Australia) to 0.78% (in Victoria). Nationwide the party received 78,710 votes (0.62%).

== Preferences ==
During the 2007 Federal election, the Climate Change Coalition was criticised for the way it distributed its preferences, with some parties antithetical to the policies of the Climate Change Coalition placed higher on Senate group voting tickets than others with more similar positions on the issue. Political journalist Malcolm Farr observed that "Hanson, the Queensland political relic standing for the Senate, has managed a preference deal with the snooty CCC...".

The CCC preferenced the Australian Democrats highest in all States and placed the Greens ahead of the Liberal and Labor Parties in all States. The flow of preferences did not affect the election of the Greens' Scott Ludlam to the final Senate position in WA. According to the Party, the allocation of preferences was determined to give the greatest chance of electoral success, but may have worked to reduce its primary vote support.

== Name change and Deregistration ==
On 24 December 2009, the Australian Electoral Commission (AEC) approved the Climate Change Coalition's application to change its name to "4Change". The party was deregistered by the AEC in March, 2010, on the grounds of irregularities in its declarations on membership.

== See also ==
- Fusion Party (Australia)
- Sustainable Australia Party
