= Post-election pendulum for the 2015 Queensland state election =

The following is a Mackerras pendulum for the 2015 Queensland state election.

"Safe" seats require a swing of over 10 per cent to change, "fairly safe" seats require a swing of between 6 and 10 per cent, while "marginal" seats require a swing of less than 6 per cent.

Labor seats
Marginal
Ferny Grove	Mark Furner	ALP	0.82
Bundaberg	Leanne Donaldson	ALP	1.62
Maryborough	Bruce Saunders	ALP	1.65
Springwood	Mick de Brenni	ALP	1.73
Pumicestone	Rick Williams	ALP	2.08
Mount Coot-tha	Steven Miles	ALP	2.59
Mundingburra	Coralee O'Rourke	ALP	2.76
Barron River	Craig Crawford	ALP	3.12
Brisbane Central	Grace Grace	ALP	3.25
Ashgrove	Kate Jones	ALP	4.25
Greenslopes	Joseph Kelly	ALP	4.25
Keppel	Brittany Lauga	ALP	4.80
Mirani	Jim Pearce	ALP	4.82
Stretton	Duncan Pegg	ALP	4.98
Thuringowa	Aaron Harper	ALP	5.54
Townsville	Scott Stewart	ALP	5.69
Fairly safe
Kallangur	Shane King	ALP	6.13
Bulimba	Di Farmer	ALP	6.14
Cook	Billy Gordon	ALP	6.77
Algester	Leeanne Enoch	ALP	6.99
Capalaba	Don Brown	ALP	7.06
Sunnybank	Peter Russo	ALP	7.19
Murrumba	Chris Whiting	ALP	7.35
Redcliffe	Yvette D'Ath	ALP	7.58
Pine Rivers	Nikki Boyd	ALP	7.68
Ipswich West	Jim Madden	ALP	7.71
Cairns	Rob Pyne	ALP	8.45
Stafford	Anthony Lynham	ALP	9.59
Lytton	Joan Pease	ALP	9.80
Safe
Sandgate	Stirling Hinchliffe	ALP	10.10
Logan	Linus Power	ALP	10.82
Nudgee	Leanne Linard	ALP	11.25
Gladstone	Glenn Butcher	ALP v IND	11.89
Morayfield	Mark Ryan	ALP	11.91
Mackay	Julieanne Gilbert	ALP	12.39
Mulgrave	Curtis Pitt	ALP	12.76
Yeerongpilly	Mark Bailey	ALP	13.30
Waterford	Shannon Fentiman	ALP	13.33
South Brisbane	Jackie Trad	ALP	13.79
Rockhampton	William Byrne	ALP	13.87
Ipswich	Jennifer Howard	ALP	15.90
Bundamba	Jo-Ann Miller	ALP	21.43
Inala	Annastacia Palaszczuk	ALP	25.12
Woodridge	Cameron Dick	ALP	25.95

Liberal National seats
Marginal
Lockyer	Ian Rickuss	LNP v ONP	0.22
Mount Ommaney	Tarnya Smith	LNP	0.23
Whitsunday	Jason Costigan	LNP	0.38
Mansfield	Ian Walker	LNP	0.55
Glass House	Andrew Powell	LNP	1.41
Toowoomba North	Trevor Watts	LNP	1.61
Albert	Mark Boothman	LNP	1.67
Everton	Tim Mander	LNP	1.77
Redlands	Matt McEachan	LNP	2.23
Gaven	Sid Cramp	LNP	2.24
Chatsworth	Steve Minnikin	LNP	2.62
Burdekin	Dale Last	LNP	2.88
Southport	Rob Molhoek	LNP	3.24
Caloundra	Mark McArdle	LNP	3.82
Aspley	Tracy Davis	LNP	5.17
Currumbin	Jann Stuckey	LNP	5.23
Cleveland	Mark Robinson	LNP	5.45
Fairly safe
Burleigh	Michael Hart	LNP	6.16
Hervey Bay	Ted Sorensen	LNP	6.62
Callide	Jeff Seeney	LNP v PUP	6.67
Indooroopilly	Scott Emerson	LNP	6.73
Burnett	Stephen Bennett	LNP	6.80
Hinchinbrook	Andrew Cripps	LNP	7.06
Gympie	Tony Perrett	LNP	7.10
Broadwater	Verity Barton	LNP	7.19
Clayfield	Tim Nicholls	LNP	7.21
Beaudesert	Jon Krause	LNP	7.53
Moggill	Christian Rowan	LNP	8.21
Coomera	Michael Crandon	LNP	8.53
Noosa	Glen Elmes	LNP v GRN	8.62
Toowoomba South	John McVeigh	LNP	8.89
Maroochydore	Fiona Simpson	LNP	9.27
Safe
Kawana	Jarrod Bleijie	LNP	10.09
Mudgeeraba	Ros Bates	LNP	10.97
Gregory	Lachlan Millar	LNP	11.07
Buderim	Steve Dickson	LNP	12.16
Mermaid Beach	Ray Stevens	LNP	12.93
Nanango	Deb Frecklington	LNP	13.16
Warrego	Ann Leahy	LNP	15.43
Condamine	Pat Weir	LNP	16.28
Southern Downs	Lawrence Springborg	LNP	19.20
Surfers Paradise	John-Paul Langbroek	LNP	19.21
Crossbench seats
Nicklin	Peter Wellington	IND v LNP	14.89
Dalrymple	Shane Knuth	KAP v LNP	15.10
Mount Isa	Rob Katter	KAP v LNP	15.19
