= Abortion in Queensland =

Abortion in Queensland, Australia, is available on request in the first 22 weeks of pregnancy, with the approval of two doctors usually required for later terminations of pregnancy. Queensland law prohibits protesters from coming within 150 metres of an abortion clinic and requires conscientiously objecting doctors to refer women seeking an abortion to a doctor who will provide one. The current legal framework was introduced by the Palaszczuk Labor Government with the passage of the Termination of Pregnancy Act by the Parliament of Queensland on 17 October 2018 in a conscience vote. Before the Termination of Pregnancy Act took effect on 3 December 2018, abortion was subject to the Criminal Code and the common law McGuire ruling, which made abortion unlawful unless the abortion provider had a reasonable belief that a woman's physical or mental health was at risk. Availability varies across the state, and is more limited in rural and remote areas outside South East Queensland. In the absence of standardised data collection, it is estimated that between 10,000 and 14,000 abortions occur every year in Queensland.

In 2024, The LNP Premier David Crisafulli banned discussions and debate on abortion for 4 years in the parliament.

== History ==
=== Criminalisation ===
Queensland abortion law was originally based on section 58 of the British Offences Against the Person Act 1861, which made abortion a crime. The Queensland Criminal Code contained three provisions criminalising abortion:

- Section 224 made it a criminal offence to administer "any poison or noxious thing" or use "any other means what ever" to procure the miscarriage of a woman, with a maximum penalty of 14 years imprisonment.
- Section 225 made it illegal for a woman to attempt to procure her own miscarriage, with a maximum penalty of seven years imprisonment.
- Section 226 made it illegal to assist someone in procuring an abortion, imposing a maximum penalty of three years imprisonment.

Section 282 provided an exemption from criminal liability for anyone performing "a surgical operation upon any person for the patient's benefit, or upon an unborn child for the preservation of the mother’s life".

Official opposition to abortion was particularly strong during the rule of Joh Bjelke-Petersen in the 1970s and 1980s. In 1980 the Bjelke-Petersen Government attempted to criminalise abortion in all circumstances unless a woman's death was imminent. The proposed law, the Pregnancy Termination Control Bill, passed its first reading but was voted down in the second reading when 19 government members crossed the floor to vote against it.

During these years, many Queensland women seeking abortion were forced to travel to Sydney, aided by Children By Choice and by Control Abortion Referral Service.

In 1985 Queensland Police launched "Operation Lost Cause" and raided two abortion clinics, seizing thousands of patient files and prosecuting one abortion provider for breaching the Criminal Code. The abortion provider was found not guilty, with his case leading to the McGuire ruling that clarified the circumstances when abortion was lawful.

=== 1986 McGuire ruling ===
Before the passage of the Abortion Law Reform Act 2008 in Victoria, that state's legal approach to abortion was similar to that prevailing in New South Wales and Queensland. In the 1969 Victorian case of R v Davidson, Justice Clifford Menhennitt of the Supreme Court of Victoria ruled that an abortion performed in the reasonable belief it was necessary to protect the woman's physical or mental wellbeing was lawful, which became known as the "Menhennitt ruling".

The Menhennitt ruling was applied in the 1986 Queensland case R v Bayliss; R v Cullen by Judge McGuire of the District Court of Queensland, which he considered to mirror the lawful abortion exemption established by section 282 of the Criminal Code. This resulting "McGuire ruling" allowed abortion to protect a woman's physical or mental health, and was upheld on appeal by the Supreme Court of Queensland. In 1995 the McGuire ruling was followed by then-Justice Paul de Jersey in the Supreme Court case of Veivers v Connolly.

=== 2009 prosecution and changes ===
In 2009 a Cairns couple was charged by Queensland Police under anti-abortion laws after imported mifepristone was found in their home. This led to Queensland hospitals refusing to perform medical abortions given the section 282 exemption from criminal liability appeared to cover only surgical abortion. The couple was found not guilty.

The case led the Bligh Government to amend section 232 of the Criminal Code to expand its legal immunity for exempt surgical abortions to also include medical abortions. Despite her personal support for decriminalisation, Anna Bligh refused to introduce broader changes to abortion laws, stating that a conscience vote on decriminalisation would fail and might actually lead to tighter restrictions. Bligh's approach was criticised by doctors but welcomed by the Australian Christian Lobby's Jim Wallace.

On 3 September 2009 the Criminal Code (Medical Amendment) was passed by the Parliament of Queensland after a one-hour debate, with independent politician Liz Cunningham the only vote against. Aside from expanding the scope of the section 282 exemption from criminal liability, the amendments also allow women to self-administer abortifacients in accordance with a prescription.

=== 2016 child abortion case and Pyne bills ===
In the 2016 Queensland Supreme Court case of Central Queensland Hospital and Health Service v Q, Justice Duncan McMeekin authorised a 12-year-old girl to undergo an abortion due to the risk of self-harm and suicide. The case led abortion advocates to criticise the need for court involvement in such cases, with Larissa Waters and Rob Pyne arguing it demonstrated the need to change Queensland's abortion laws. The girl's treating obstetrician David Macfarlane told a Queensland parliamentary inquiry into abortion law that the case set a precedent that young girls lacked capacity to give informed consent, injecting court involvement into situations that had earlier involved just the girl and medical staff. The case led Labor-turned-independent politician Pyne to propose laws decriminalising abortion to the Queensland Parliament.

On 10 May 2016 Rob Pyne introduced the Abortion Law Reform (Woman's Right to Choose) Amendment Bill 2016 to remove abortion from the Criminal Code. The matter was referred to the Health, Communities, Disability Services and Domestic and Family Violence Prevention Committee, which also considered the termination of pregnancies in Queensland more broadly. In August 2016 the Committee released its report, recommending that the bill not be passed. The bill left several policy issues unregulated, including gestational limits, the rights of conscientious objectors and "safe access zones" near abortion providers.

To address the issues on which the first bill was silent, on 27 August 2016 Pyne introduced the Health (Abortion Law Reform) Amendment Bill 2016. This bill would amend the Health Act to require the approval of two doctors to terminate a pregnancy of 24 weeks or more, allow conscientious objection unless a woman's life was at risk and block abortion opponents from protesting within 50 metres of abortion clinics. On 17 February 2017, the Committee issued its report with a split recommendation. Liberal National Party members of the Committee raised concerns that if the second bill passed while the first failed, it would create legal confusion by subjecting abortion to conflicting criminal and health laws.

On 28 February 2017 Pyne withdrew both bills after the Liberal National Party of Queensland signalled that none of its members would vote for the proposed laws. The Labor Government promised to refer the matter of abortion to the Queensland Law Reform Commission for its recommendations and to introduce new laws in its next term of government if elected.

=== 2018 legalisation ===
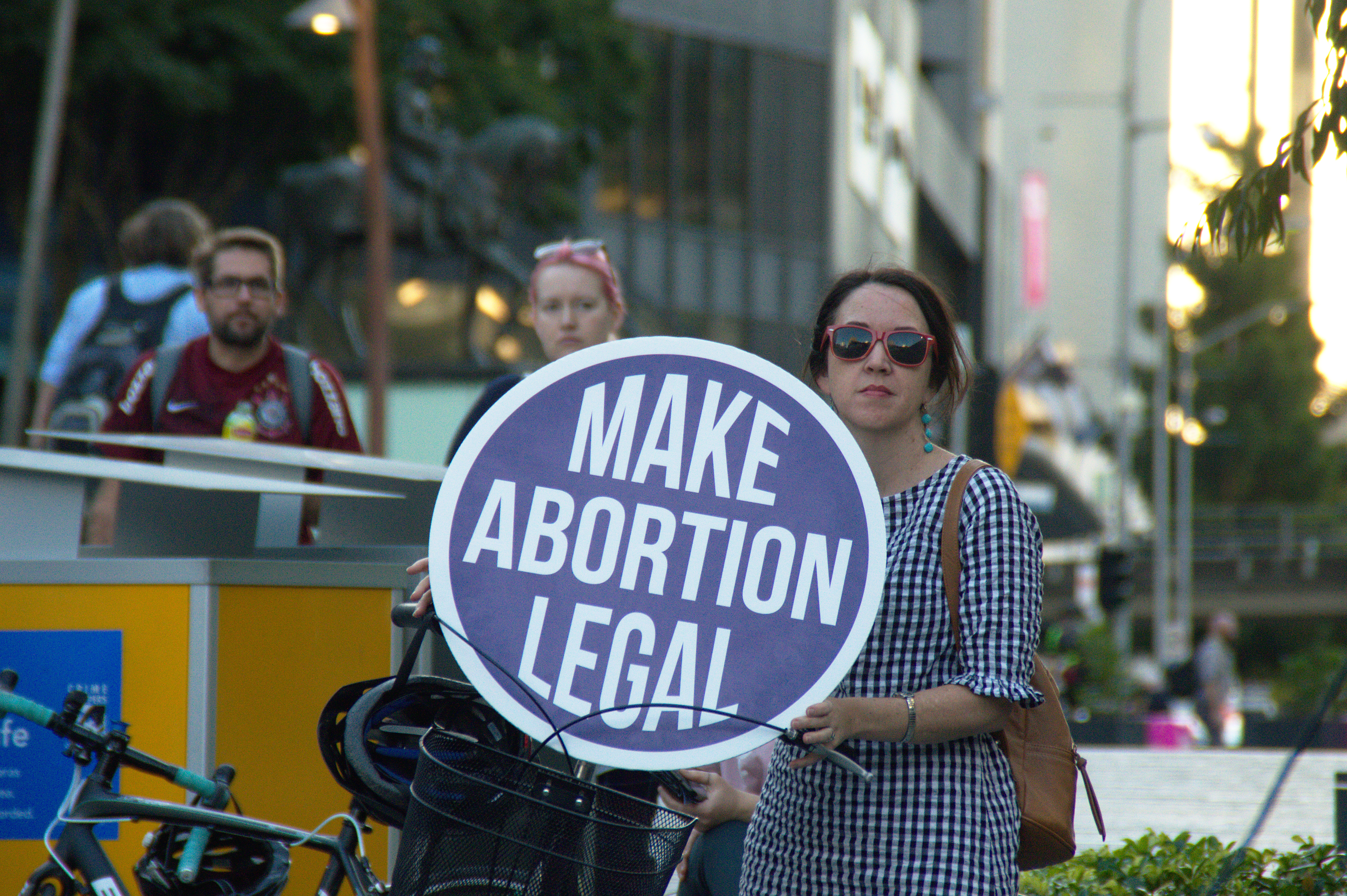
A pro-choice activist in Brisbane, 2018

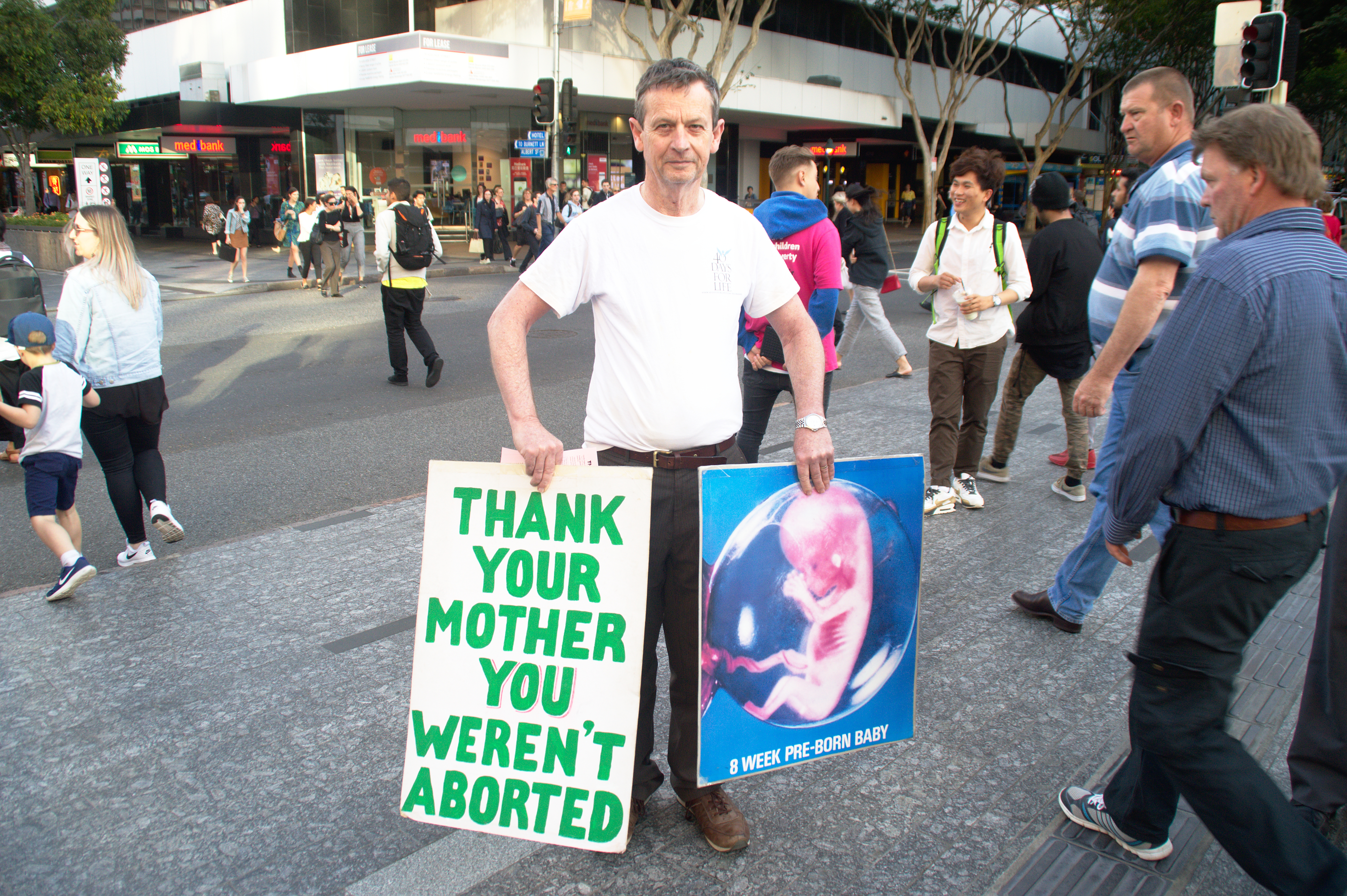
A pro-life activist in Brisbane, 2018

Following the withdrawal of Pyne's bills, on 19 June 2017 Attorney-General Yvette D'Ath referred Queensland's pregnancy termination laws to the Queensland Law Reform Commission to review and recommend changes. On 21 December 2017, the Commission released a consultation paper and called for submissions from the public. The Commission produced its report in June 2018. On 22 August 2018 the Termination of Pregnancy Bill was introduced to Parliament and referred to the Health, Communities, Disability Services and Domestic and Family Violence Prevention Committee for consideration. The bill's Explanatory Notes outlined the proposed changes and noted they were informed by the Commission's report. On 5 October 2018 the Committee's report was tabled, recommending that the law be passed and that all politicians be granted a conscience vote.

The Queensland Parliament set aside three sitting days commencing 16 October 2018 to debate the proposed law. Both the Labor Party and Liberal National Party allowed their members a conscience vote on the issue. Politicians spoke emotionally and passionately both for and against the bill.

The conscience vote split largely along party lines, with almost all members of the governing Labor Party voting in favour except Jo-Ann Miller who voted against and Linus Power who abstained. By contrast, almost all members of the opposition Liberal National Party of Queensland opposed the law apart from Jann Stuckey, Steve Minnikin and former party leader Tim Nicholls who voted in favour. Liberal National party president Gary Spence had previously warned members of the party that their preselection would be at risk if they supported the law. On the cross-bench, Independent Sandy Bolton and Greens MP Michael Berkman supported the law while the Katter's Australian Party and Pauline Hanson's One Nation MPs opposed it. Political analysts noted the increased female representation in Parliament and in leadership roles across both major parties changed the debate compared to earlier discussions of abortion in the state. There was a notable gender divide, a majority of those voting in favour were women, while most of those opposed were men (though two of the three LNP members who voted in favour were male).

The legislation was granted royal assent on 25 October and went into effect on 3 December 2018.

Details of 2018 Legislative Assembly vote to decriminalise abortion

Termination of Pregnancy Bill 2018 – Third Reading
| Party | Votes for | Votes against | Abstained |
|---|---|---|---|
| Labor (48) | 45: Mark Bailey; Nikki Boyd; Don Brown; Glenn Butcher; Craig Crawford; Yvette D'Ath; Mick de Brenni; Cameron Dick; Leeanne Enoch; Di Farmer; Shannon Fentiman; Mark Furner; Julieanne Gilbert; Grace Grace; Aaron Harper; Michael Healy; Stirling Hinchliffe; Jennifer Howard; Kate Jones; Joe Kelly; Shane King; Brittany Lauga; Leanne Linard; Cynthia Lui; Anthony Lynham; Jim Madden; Melissa McMahon; Corrine McMillan; Bart Mellish; Steven Miles; Charis Mullen; Barry O'Rourke; Coralee O'Rourke; Annastacia Palaszczuk (Premier); Joan Pease; Duncan Pegg; Jess Pugh; Kim Richards; Peter Russo; Mark Ryan; Bruce Saunders; Meaghan Scanlon; Scott Stewart; Jackie Trad; Chris Whiting | 1: Jo-Ann Miller | 1: Linus Power |
| Liberal National (39) | 3: Steve Minnikin; Tim Nicholls; Jann Stuckey | 36: Ros Bates; David Batt; Stephen Bennett; Jarrod Bleijie; Mark Boothman; Colin Boyce; Jason Costigan; Michael Crandon; David Crisafulli; Deb Frecklington (Opposition Leader); Michael Hart; Marty Hunt; David Janetzki; Jon Krause; John-Paul Langbroek; Dale Last; Ann Leahy; James Lister; Tim Mander; Mark McArdle; Jim McDonald; Brent Mickelberg; Lachlan Millar; Rob Molhoek; Sam O'Connor; Tony Perrett; Andrew Powell; Dan Purdie; Mark Robinson; Christian Rowan; Fiona Simpson; Ted Sorensen; Ray Stevens; Trevor Watts; Pat Weir; Simone Wilson | – |
| Katter's Australian (3) | – | 3: Nick Dametto; Rob Katter; Shane Knuth | – |
| Greens (1) | 1: Michael Berkman | – | – |
| One Nation (1) | – | 1: Stephen Andrew | – |
| Independent (1) | 1: Sandy Bolton | – | – |
| Total | 50 | 41 | 1 |

== Policy advocacy ==
A number of groups in the state actively lobby on both sides of the abortion debate, with protests held by supporters and opponents of decriminalisation. Groups in favour include Children by Choice, Pro Choice Queensland and Fair Agenda.

Groups opposed to abortion include Cherish Life Queensland and Project 139. Project 139 demonstrated outside several abortion clinics in Brisbane. The Catholic Church is actively opposed to reducing abortion restrictions, raising among other concerns the risk of people engaging in sex-selective abortions. Archbishop of Brisbane Mark Coleridge sent an email to Catholic school parents opposing the Termination of Pregnancy Act.

== Polling ==
A YouGov/Galaxy poll in August 2018, found that 60% of Queenslanders oppose abortions past 13 weeks.

== See also ==
- Abortion in Australia
