= Nicholls shadow ministry =

The shadow ministry of Tim Nicholls is the Liberal National Party opposition between May 2016 and December 2017, opposing the Palaszczuk government in the Parliament of Queensland. It was led by Tim Nicholls following his election as leader of the party and Opposition Leader on 6 May 2016. Deb Frecklington was the deputy party leader and Deputy Leader of the Opposition.

The current shadow ministry was announced on 8 May 2016. It succeeded the Springborg shadow ministry and was replaced by the Frecklington shadow ministry on 15 December 2017.

Portfolio	Shadow minister
Leader of the Opposition; Shadow Minister for Arts and Major Events	Tim Nicholls
Deputy Leader of the Opposition; Shadow Minister for Infrastructure, State Development, Trade and Investment	Deb Frecklington
Shadow Treasurer; Shadow Minister for Small Business	Scott Emerson
Shadow Minister for Health and Ambulance Services; Shadow Minister for the Commonwealth Games	John-Paul Langbroek
Shadow Minister for Education	Tracy Davis
Shadow Minister for Employment, Industrial Relations, Skills and Training; Shadow Minister for Fair Trading	Jarrod Bleijie
Shadow Minister for Transport and Main Roads; Shadow Minister for Local Government	Andrew Powell
Shadow Minister for Police, Fire and Emergency Services; Shadow Minister for Corrective Services	Tim Mander
Shadow Minister for Natural Resources and Mines; Shadow Minister for Northern Development	Andrew Cripps
Shadow Minister for Agriculture, Fisheries and Forestry	Dale Last
Shadow Minister for Environment and Heritage Protection; Shadow Minister for National Parks and the Great Barrier Reef	Christian Rowan
Shadow Attorney-General; Shadow Minister for Justice and Planning	Ian Walker
Shadow Minister for Aboriginal, Torres Strait Islander Partnerships and Multicultural Affairs	Fiona Simpson
Shadow Minister for Communities, Child Safety, Disability Services and the Prevention of Family and Domestic Violence	Ros Bates
Shadow Minister for Energy, Biofuels and Water Supply	Michael Hart
Shadow Minister for Science, Innovation and the Digital Economy	Tarnya Smith
Shadow Minister for Housing and Public Works	Stephen Bennett
Shadow Minister for Tourism, Sport and Racing	Jon Krause
Shadow Assistant Minister
Shadow Assistant Minister to the Leader of the Opposition	Matt McEachan
Shadow Assistant Minister for North Queensland	Jason Costigan
Shadow Parliamentary Roles
Leader of Opposition Business	Jeff Seeney
Chief Opposition Whip	Trevor Watts
Deputy Opposition Whip	Steve Minnikin
Party Secretary	Ann Leahy

== See also ==
- 2017 Queensland state election
- First Palaszczuk Ministry
