= Springborg shadow ministry =

Liberal National Party opposition to Palaszczuk government in Queensland, Australia

The shadow ministry of Lawrence Springborg is the Liberal National Party opposition between February 2015 and May 2016, opposing the Palaszczuk government in the Parliament of Queensland. It was led by Lawrence Springborg following his election as leader of the party and Opposition Leader on 14 February 2015. John-Paul Langbroek was the deputy party leader and Deputy Leader of the Opposition. Their elections came after the shock loss of government for the LNP in which the Premier Campbell Newman also lost his seat of Ashgrove to Labor's Kate Jones.

The final arrangement of the shadow ministry was announced on 20 February 2015. It succeeded the Palaszczuk shadow ministry and was replaced by the Nicholls shadow ministry 6 May 2016.

Portfolio	Shadow minister
Leader of the Opposition	Lawrence Springborg
Deputy Leader of the Opposition; Shadow Treasurer; Shadow Minister for the Commonwealth Games	John-Paul Langbroek
Shadow Minister for Infrastructure, Planning, Small Business, Employment and Trade	Tim Nicholls
Shadow Minister for Health	Mark McArdle
Shadow Minister for Education and Training	Tim Mander
Shadow Minister for Natural Resources and Mines, State Development and Northern Development	Andrew Cripps
Shadow Attorney-General; Shadow Minister for Justice, Industrial Relations and the Arts	Ian Walker
Shadow Minister for Police, Fire, Emergency Services and Corrective Services	Jarrod Bleijie
Shadow Minister for Local Government and Main Roads, Community Recovery and Resilience	Fiona Simpson
Shadow Minister for Transport	Scott Emerson
Shadow Minister for Agriculture, Fisheries and Forestry	Deb Frecklington
Shadow Minister for Housing and Public Works	Rob Molhoek
Shadow Minister for Environment, Heritage Protection and National Parks	Stephen Bennett
Shadow Minister for Energy and Water Supply	Andrew Powell
Shadow Minister for Communities, Child Safety and Disability Services	Tracy Davis
Shadow Minister for Science, Information Technology and Innovation	John McVeigh
Shadow Minister for Tourism, Major Events, Sport and Racing	Jann Stuckey
Shadow Minister for Aboriginal, Torres Strait Islander and Multicultural Affairs	Tarnya Smith
Shadow Assistant Minister
Shadow Assistant Minister to the Opposition Leader for North Queensland	Jason Costigan
Shadow Parliamentary Roles
Leader of Opposition Business	Ray Stevens
Chairman of Parliamentary Policy Committees	Jeff Seeney
Opposition Whip	Ian Rickuss
Deputy Opposition Whip	Steve Minnikin

== See also ==
- 2015 Queensland state election
- First Palaszczuk Ministry
