= Frecklington shadow ministry =

The shadow ministry of Deb Frecklington was the Liberal National Party opposition between December 2017 and November 2020, opposing the Palaszczuk government in the Parliament of Queensland. It was led by Deb Frecklington following her election as leader of the party and Opposition Leader on 12 December 2017. Tim Mander was the deputy party leader and Deputy Leader of the Opposition.

The shadow ministry was announced on 15 December 2017. It succeeded the Nicholls shadow ministry and was replaced by the Crisafulli shadow ministry on 16 November 2020.

== Composition ==
Portfolio	Shadow minister	Image
Leader of the Opposition; Shadow Minister for Trade	Deb Frecklington MP	
Deputy Leader of the Opposition; Shadow Treasurer	Tim Mander MP	
Shadow Development, Manufacturing, Infrastructure and Planning	Andrew Powell MP	
Shadow Minister for Employment and Small Business; Shadow Minister for Training and Skills Development	Fiona Simpson MP	
Shadow Minister for Health and Ambulance Services; Shadow Minister for Women	Ros Bates MP	
Shadow Minister for Education; Shadow Minister for Industrial Relations	Jarrod Bleijie MP	
Shadow Attorney-General	David Janetzki MP	
Shadow Minister for Transport and Main Roads	Steve Minnikin MP	
Shadow Minister for Natural Resources and Mines; Shadow Minister for Northern Queensland	Dale Last MP	
Shadow Minister for Police and Counter-Terrorism; Shadow Minister for Corrective Services	Dan Purdie MP	
Shadow Minister for Environment, Science and the Great Barrier Reef; Shadow Minister for Tourism	David Crisafulli MP	
Shadow Minister for Agriculture; Shadow Minister for Fisheries and Forestry	Tony Perrett MP	
Shadow Minister Housing and Public Works; Shadow Minister for Energy and Digital Innovation	Michael Hart MP	
Shadow Minister for Local Government	Ann Leahy MP	
Shadow Minister for Communities, Disability Services and Seniors; Shadow Minister for Aboriginal and Torres Strait Islander Partnerships; Shadow Minister for the Arts	Dr Christian Rowan MP	
Shadow Minister for Sport, Racing and the Commonwealth Games; Shadow Minister for Multicultural Affairs	John-Paul Langbroek MP	
Shadow Minister for Child Safety, Youth and the Prevention of Domestic and Family Violence; Shadow Minister for Veterans	Stephen Bennett MP	
Shadow Minister for Fire, Emergency Services and Volunteers	Lachlan Millar MP	
Shadow Assistant Ministers
Shadow Assistant Minister to the Leader of the Opposition; Assistant Minister for Youth	Sam O'Connor MP	
Shadow Assistant Treasurer	Marty Hunt MP	
Shadow Assistant Minister for State Development	David Batt MP	
Shadow Assistant Minister Tourism, Industry and Development	Brent Mickelberg MP	
Shadow Parliamentary Roles
Manager of Opposition Business	Jarrod Bleijie MP	
Chief Opposition Whip	Rob Molhoek MP	
Deputy Opposition Whip	Mark Boothman MP	
Party Secretary	Ann Leahy MP	

== See also ==
- 2020 Queensland state election
- Second Palaszczuk Ministry
