= Jackie Trad =

Australian politician (born 1972)

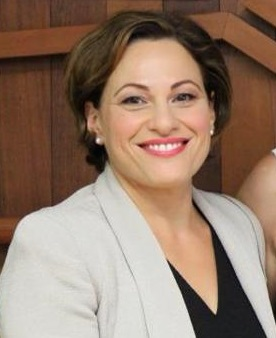

34th Deputy Premier of Queensland
- In office 14 February 2015 – 10 May 2020
- Premier: Annastacia Palaszczuk
- Preceded by: Jeff Seeney
- Succeeded by: Steven Miles

Treasurer of Queensland
- In office 12 December 2017 – 10 May 2020
- Premier: Annastacia Palaszczuk
- Preceded by: Curtis Pitt
- Succeeded by: Cameron Dick

Minister for Aboriginal and Torres Strait Islander Partnerships of Queensland
- In office 12 December 2017 – 10 May 2020
- Premier: Annastacia Palaszczuk
- Preceded by: Mark Furner
- Succeeded by: Craig Crawford

Minister for Transport of Queensland
- In office 9 February 2017 – 12 December 2017
- Premier: Annastacia Palaszczuk
- Preceded by: Stirling Hinchliffe
- Succeeded by: Mark Bailey
- In office 14 February 2015 – 8 December 2015
- Preceded by: Scott Emerson
- Succeeded by: Stirling Hinchliffe

Minister for Infrastructure, Local Government and Planning of Queensland
- In office 14 February 2015 – 12 December 2017
- Premier: Annastacia Palaszczuk
- Preceded by: Jeff Seeney
- Succeeded by: Cameron Dick

Minister for Trade and Investment of Queensland
- In office 14 February 2015 – 10 February 2017
- Premier: Annastacia Palaszczuk
- Preceded by: Tim Nicholls
- Succeeded by: Curtis Pitt
Shadow cabinet posts
Shadow Minister for Main Roads
In office 4 March 2014 – 14 February 2015
Leader	Annastacia Palaszczuk
Preceded by	Tim Mulherin
Succeeded by	Fiona Simpson
Shadow Minister for Transport
In office 10 May 2012 – 14 February 2015
Leader	Annastacia Palaszczuk
Preceded by	Desley Scott
Succeeded by	Scott Emerson
Shadow Minister for Environment and Heritage Protection, Small Business and Consumer Affairs & The Arts
In office 10 May 2012 – 14 February 2015
Leader	Annastacia Palaszczuk
Preceded by	Bill Byrne (Environment and Heritage Protection); Annastacia Palaszczuk (Small Business & The Arts)
Succeeded by	Stephen Bennett (Environment and Heritage Protection); Tim Nicholls (Small Business); Ian Walker (The Arts)

Member of the Queensland Parliament for South Brisbane
- In office 28 April 2012 – 6 October 2020
- Preceded by: Anna Bligh
- Succeeded by: Amy MacMahon

Personal details
- Born: Jacklyn Anne Trad; 25 April 1972 (age 54) South Brisbane, Queensland, Australia
- Party: Labor
- Spouse: Damien van Brunschot
- Children: 2
- Education: Griffith University (BA); University of Sydney (MA)
- Occupation: Public Servant; Industrial Organiser

Jacklyn Anne Trad (born 25 April 1972) is an Australian company director and former politician, and CEO of the Clean Energy Council. She was Deputy Premier of Queensland from 2015 to 2020, Treasurer of Queensland from 2017 to 2020 and represented the Electoral district of South Brisbane for the Labor Party from April 2012 to October 2020.

Trad also was Queensland's Minister for Transport, Minister for Trade, Minister for Infrastructure, Local Government and Planning, and Minister for Aboriginal and Torres Strait Islander Partnerships in the Palaszczuk Government.

== Personal life and family ==
Trad is the second daughter of Lebanese immigrants; Lebanese Arabic was her first language. The family returned to Lebanon in 1979 to live in Beirut for one year where she attended the International College. Back in Australia, she attended Lourdes Hill College in Brisbane and her parents became local small business owners, operating a fruit shop in Woolloongabba. She began an arts degree at Griffith University and completed a Master of Public Policy at the University of Sydney.

She grew up in South Brisbane and currently lives in the suburb of West End with her husband and two children.

Trad identifies as Catholic and with her Maronite Church heritage.

== Political career ==
Trad was elected to the legislature at the South Brisbane by-election held on 28 April 2012. The by-election was held after the resignation of the previous Labor Party incumbent and former Premier Anna Bligh.

Trad has also held several positions within the structure of the Australian Labor Party (ALP). She was formerly the Queensland ALP Assistant State Secretary, President of the Kurilpa Branch, a delegate to the ALP National and State Conferences, member of the National Executive Committee and also the Secretary of Labor Women's Organisation Queensland. She is the former leader of Queensland Labor's Left Faction. At the age of 26, she was a paper candidate for Labor at the 1998 state election, running in the Darling Downs seat of Cunnhingam and finishing third with 18.9%.

Trad is on the record as being a supporter of same-sex marriage. She is also a supporter of adoption by same-sex partners.

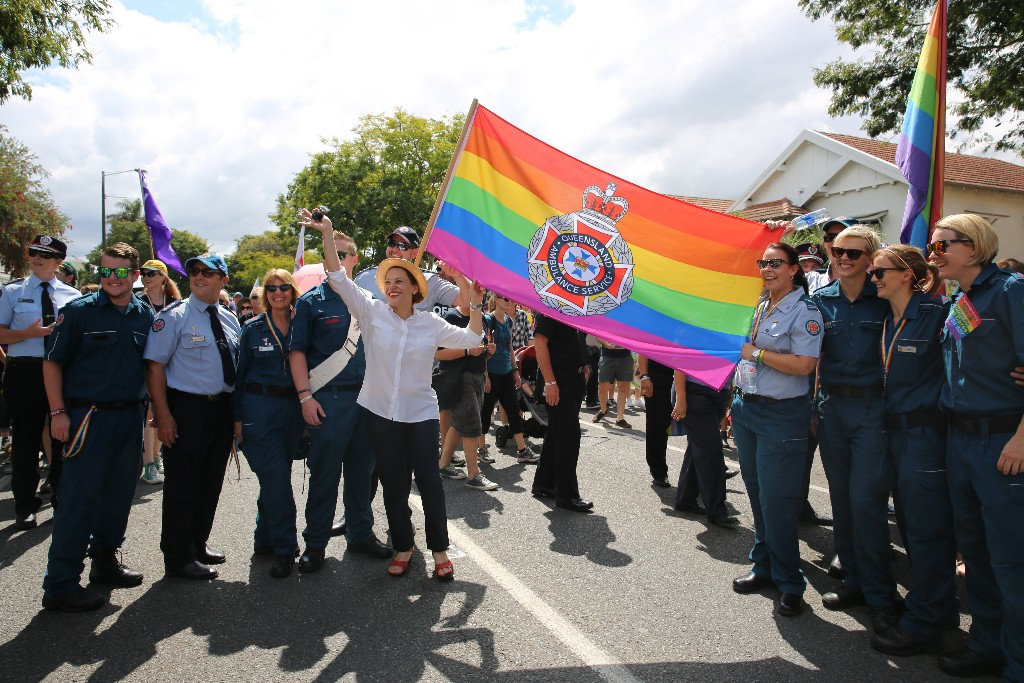
Jackie Trad MP at Brisbane Pride Festival 2016

=== Opposition ===
On 29 April 2012, Opposition Leader Annastacia Palaszczuk appointed Trad as Shadow Minister for Transport and Main Roads, Environment and Heritage Protection, Small Business, Consumer Affairs and the Arts.

Trad was appointed as a member of the Parliamentary Ethics Committee and Parliamentary Crime and Misconduct Committee respectively, and served from May 2012 to January 2015.

On 11 September 2012, Leader of the House Ray Stevens referred to Trad as "Jihad Jackie" during parliamentary debate. Believing the term to be referring to her Lebanese heritage, Ms Trad objected and requested that the remark be withdrawn. Immediately following this interaction, Premier Campbell Newman said that Jackie Trad was "precious" and needed to "harden up." Trad commented outside parliament that "It is outrageous to think that the Queensland Parliament should be condoning these sorts of racist barbs when they are unacceptable in the community." Her comments were echoed by Ethnic Communities Council executive manager Ian Muil when he said Mr Stevens' comment would upset people, especially in the Muslim community, describing it as "dog-whistle type stuff."

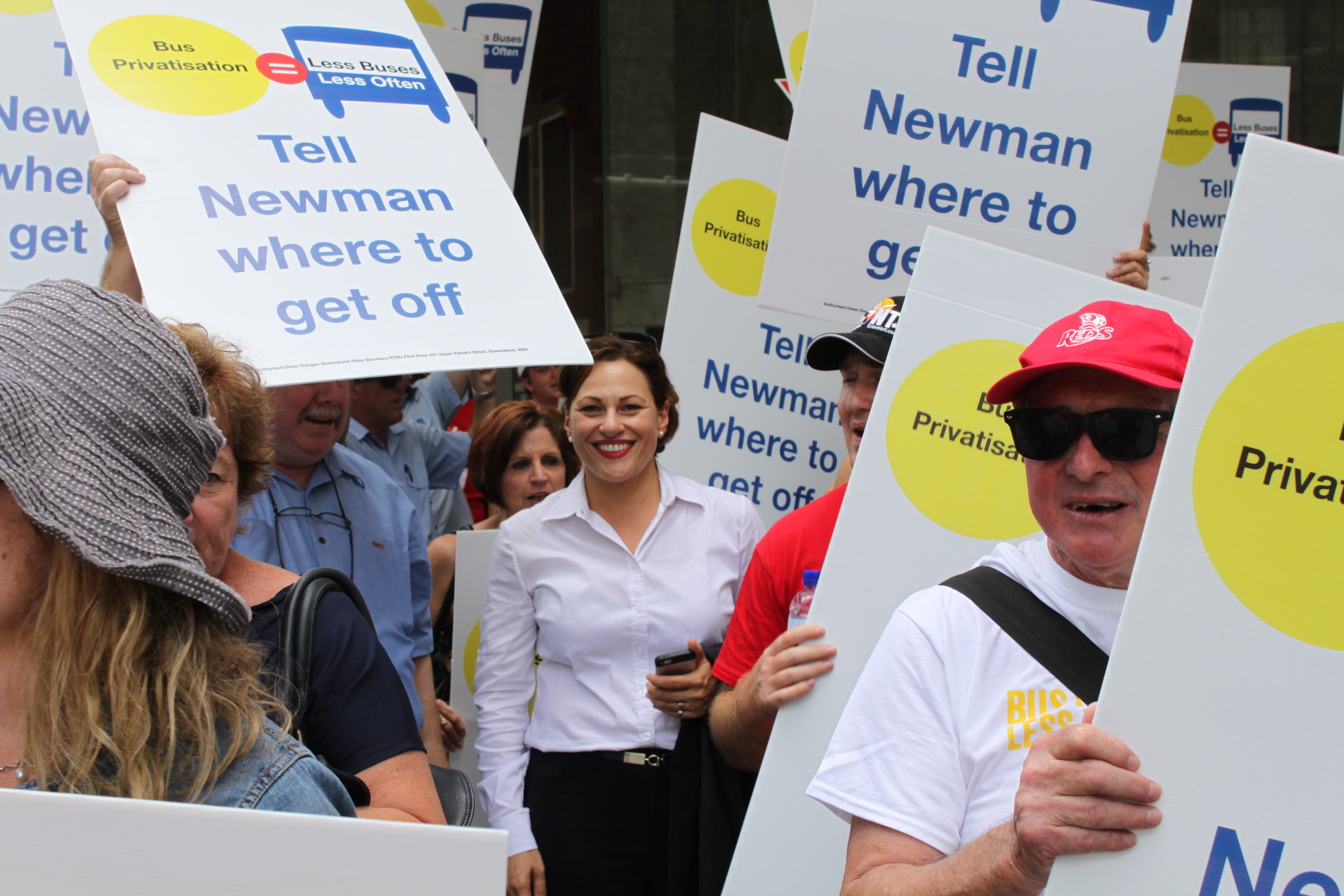
Trad at a Brisbane RTBU rally against privatisation, January 2015

=== First Palaszczuk Ministry ===
Following the Queensland state election on 31 January 2015, Tim Mulherin stood down as deputy leader, and Trad was named his successor. She thus became Deputy Premier of Queensland in the Palaszczuk Ministry on 14 February 2015.

In addition to being sworn in as the Deputy Premier, Trad became the Minister for Infrastructure, Local Government and Planning, Minister for Transport and Minister for Trade. Following changes to the Palaszczuk Ministry in December 2015, which included expanding its size from 14 to 17, the transport portfolio was transferred to new minister Stirling Hinchliffe. Following Mr Hinchliffe's resignation as Minister for Transport in February 2017, Trad regained the portfolio and held it until the Second Palaszczuk Ministry was sworn in on 12 December 2017.

==== Tree clearing laws ====
On 17 March 2016, Trad introduced the Vegetation Management (Reinstatement) Amendment Bill into parliament, the Palaszczuk Government's bill intended to reverse the previous government's repeal of the Wild Rivers Legislation, enacted in 2005 in an attempt to preserve native vegetation. The changes in legislation under the Newman Government in 2013 had allowed increased rates of tree-clearing in Queensland. The Statewide Landcover and Tree Study (SLATS) report showed 296,324 hectares was cleared in 2013–14, a threefold increase on 2009–10 and the highest level since 2006. The 2014–15 Report found that a further 207,000 hectares was cleared. Trad called the proposed legislation "nation-leading" and one of the Palaszczuk Government's key commitments for protecting the Great Barrier Reef. Despite widespread public campaigning by conservation groups, the bill failed to pass the Legislative Assembly with a vote of 42 in favour and 44 against. It was the first time the Palaszczuk Government had failed to get one of its own bills through parliament. Ms Trad announced in October 2016 that Labor would re-introduce the legislation if it won the next election. Following their victory at the 2017 Election, Labor re-introduced the bill as the Vegetation Management and Other Legislation Amendment Bill 2018 and it passed on 9 May 2018.

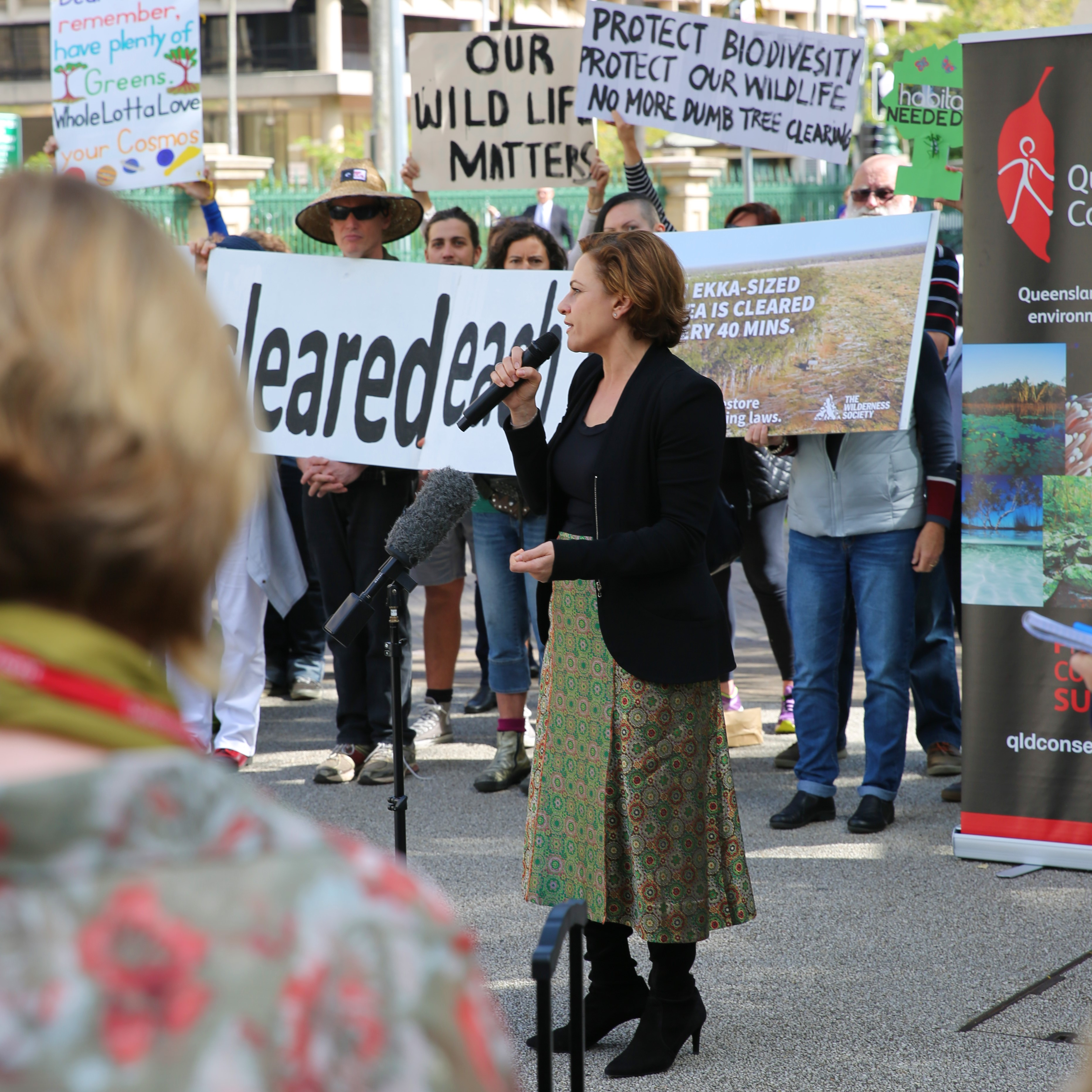
Jackie Trad MP at a public rally in support of the Vegetation Management (Reinstatement) Amendment Bill in August 2016.

==== Abortion reform ====
On 10 May 2016, Independent former-Labor MP Rob Pyne introduced two pieces of legislation to the Legislative Assembly aimed at decriminalising abortion in Queensland. Trad became the first government MP to support the bill and described herself as “unashamedly pro-choice”. She said it was time for Queensland law “to catch up with legal precedent and treat pregnancy termination as a health issue, not a criminal issue.” Her public statements in support of abortion law reform prompted Brisbane Catholic Archbishop Mark Coleridge to offer to "counsel" her and her Labor colleagues. At a rally in opposition to Mr Pyne's bills, Archbishop Coleridge also likened the practice of abortion to Nazi Germany. Ms Trad responded: "I would have thought the archbishop had more important things to focus on, like the inquiry into institutional abuse and the findings that are coming out of that inquiry than what is before the Queensland parliament," a reference to the Royal Commission into Institutional Responses to Child Sexual Abuse. Following the decision by the LNP to vote against the bills, Mr Pyne withdrew them both in February 2017.

The Palaszczuk Government referred the issue to the Queensland Law Reform Commission and pledged to introduce its own bill to decriminalise abortion in the next term of parliament. The Termination of Pregnancy Bill 2018 was introduced to the Queensland Parliament on 22 August 2018, and passed on 25 October the same year.

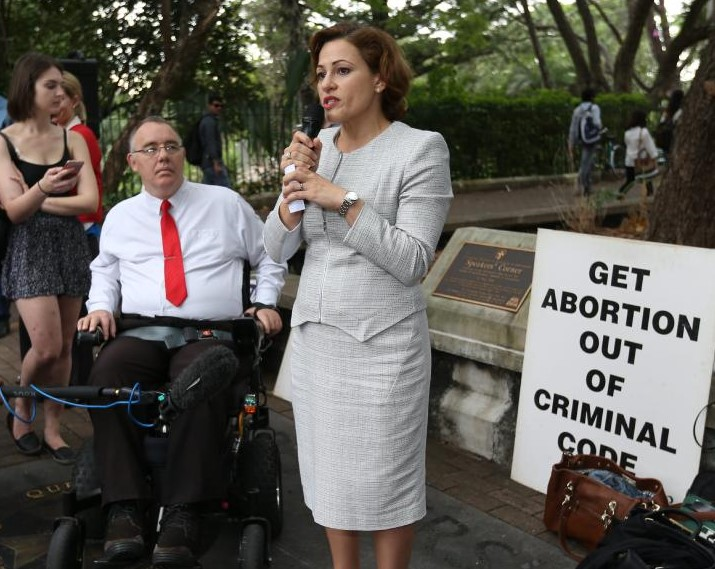
Jackie Trad MP at a rally in support of abortion law reform, May 2016.

==== Planning reform ====
On 12 November 2015, Trad introduced 3 government bills into the Legislative Assembly aimed at reforming the infrastructure and planning framework in Queensland, including what would become the Planning Act 2016. The new Planning Act made several changes to planning rules in the state including introducing 'bounded' code assessment that ensures proposed developments are more strictly assessed against the planning code, independent examination of proposed developments that may impact heritage buildings, a requirement for local government to publish reasons for development decisions for the first time, providing the ability for local governments to increase infrastructure charges to deliver community infrastructure, and affording residents and community groups the ability to appeal development decisions without adverse cost orders being awarded against them.

==== Local Government electoral reform ====
On 1 December 2016, Trad introduced the Local Government Electoral (Transparency and Accountability in Local Government) and Other Legislation Amendment Bill into Queensland Parliament. The bill was passed into law on 10 May 2017, and amended a number of existing laws, most notably the Local Government Electoral Act 2011.

The Crime and Corruption Commission’s December 2015 report regarding transparency and accountability in local government was noted as a major catalyst for the bill’s introduction. A number of reforms to local government elections resulted, including ‘real-time’ political donation disclosures (in line with reforms to state elections introduced by the Palaszczuk Government), setting the candidate and third-party election disclosure donation threshold at $500 to align with a councillor's register of interest gift disclosures threshold, and a requirement that all unspent campaign donations are either to be held for future campaign expenditure, returned to the relevant political party or transferred to a registered charity.

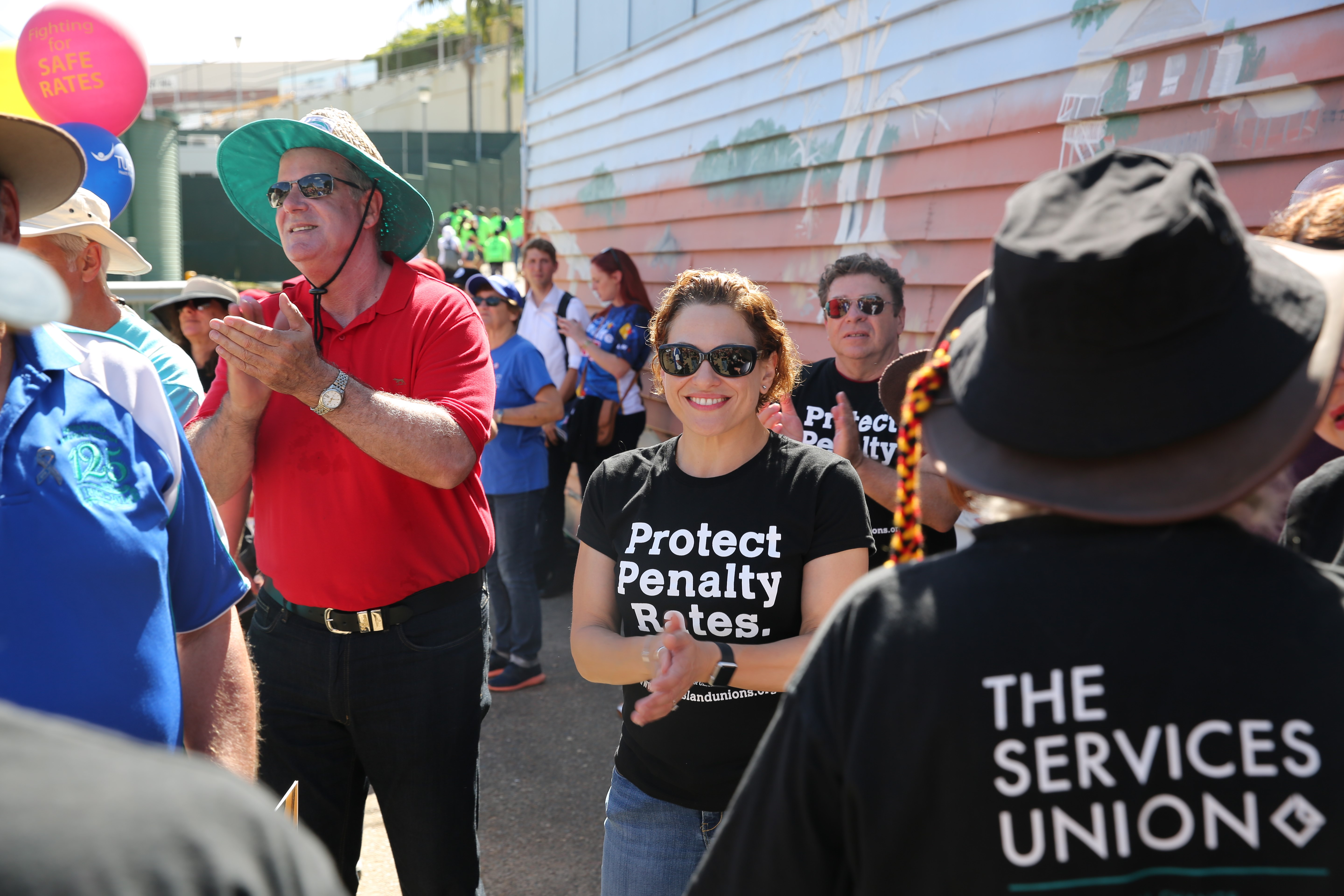
Trad at Brisbane's Labour Day Rally, 2017

=== Second Palaszczuk Ministry ===
On 12 December 2017, Trad was sworn in as Deputy Premier, Treasurer and Minister for Aboriginal and Torres Strait Islander Partnerships in the Second Palaszczuk Ministry.

==== First Budget ====
Trad delivered her first budget as Queensland Treasurer in June 2018, for the 2018–19 financial year. Official budget papers unveiled a $1.512 billion surplus in 2017–18 – more than three times the forecast in the Mid Year Fiscal and Economic Review in December 2017. The 2018–19 budget also forecast operating surpluses for the next four years. The increase in forecast surpluses meant general government sector debt in 2017–18 was approximately $2.4 billion less than estimated in the 2017–18 budget. However, government debt was forecast to increase from a total of $70.8 billion in 2018/19 to $83 billion in 2021–22.

The Budget included $50 million in 2018–19 as a capital grant to support the development of concentrated solar thermal projects to provide clean baseload power, and included additional funding over three years for solar and energy efficiency measures through the $97 million Advancing Clean Energy Schools program.

==== Mining Rehabilitation Reforms ====
Trad introduced the Mineral and Energy Resources (Financial Provisioning) Bill on 15 February 2018, and was passed in November the same year. The MERFP Act aims to ensure that land disturbed by mining activities is rehabilitated to a safe and stable landform that does not cause environmental harm, and can sustain an approved post-mining land use through requiring mining companies to develop Progressive Rehabilitation and Closure Plans. The Progressive Rehabilitation and Closure Plan requirements commenced on 1 November 2019 and have been integrated into the existing environmental authority processes for new mines.

==== Second Budget ====
Trad's second budget as Queensland Treasurer was delivered in June 2019 for the 2019–20 financial year. A significant expenditure unveiled by the budget was the allocation of $250 million to CleanCo, a recently established government-owned clean energy generator operating and growing a portfolio of low and zero emission electricity generation assets to help Queensland achieve its 50 per cent renewable energy target. The budget also included a $330 million five-year allocation for the Great Barrier Reef including to the Joint Field Management Program for reef protection measures implemented by the Great Barrier Reef Marine Park Authority and the Queensland Parks and Wildlife Service.

==== Questions over investment property ====
Queensland Premier Annastacia Palaszczuk removed Trad from all dealings with Brisbane's Cross River Rail project in the wake of controversy that emerged surrounding an investment property. The property was purchased by Trad's family trust in the Brisbane suburb of Woolloongabba for $695,000 in March 2019. The location was within proximity of the proposed Boggo Road station in the $5.4 billion Cross River Rail Project for which Trad had ministerial responsibility. Trad was subsequently referred to the Crime and Corruption Commission (CCC) by Opposition Leader Deb Frecklington. The chair of the commission recused himself from the investigation after questions about a call he received from Trad, which both parties described as a courtesy call.

In September 2019, the commission announced it would not investigate Trad, stating that they saw no evidence that supported a reasonable suspicion of corrupt conduct. The commission did make several recommendations about rule changes and legislation to lower corruption risks.

==== Resignation from Cabinet and CCC Investigation ====
On 9 May 2020, the Crime and Corruption Commission launched an investigation into Trad's potential misuse of power in the selection of a principal of a newly constructed school in her electorate. On the same day, she announced she would stand down from all her ministerial positions (including Deputy Premier and Treasurer) until the conclusion of the CCC's investigation. Health minister Steven Miles would become Deputy Premier, while Cameron Dick would become Treasurer. She formally resigned from the positions the following day.

The CCC investigation cleared Trad in July that year, stating that "there is no prima facie case that the Deputy Premier has committed a criminal offence or that she was motivated by any dishonest or corrupt intent". However, it also stated that the way in which the Department of Education had handled the recruitment exercise had created a corruption risk.

Trad later said to reporters that she felt vindicated by the CCC's findings, and that referrals by the LNP opposition to the corruption watchdog were politically motivated.

Trad later took the CCC to court to prevent the public release of the commission's report into her conduct, with litigation funded by the State Government. Another case before the state's High Court at the same time, into former public trustee and Labor figure Peter Carne, set a precedent that CCC is not able report publicly on investigations without an explicit corruption or disciplinary finding from the commission. Trad's case was subsequently dismissed in Trad's favour. The CCC Chair requested the Labor State Government change the law to allow the publication of reports in the public interest. Trad subsequently described the CCC’s case against her as “unlawful conduct” which had a “significant impact” on her political career and family over the previous three years.

=== 2020 Queensland state election ===
Trad approached the 2020 election under significant pressure. The combination of a marginal seat targeted by the Greens and the LNP's decision to preference Greens above Labor sparked speculation that Trad could lose her seat to second-time Greens challenger Amy MacMahon. Trad herself declared that she was in 'the fight of her political life.' A Newspoll for the electorate of South Brisbane in late October found that the Greens would win the seat on a 54.5% two-party-preferred vote.

On election night, ABC psephologist Antony Green called the South Brisbane seat for the Greens candidate. Despite only a small swing away from her primary vote, Trad slipped from first position to second and subsequently suffered an 8.90% two candidate preferred swing following the distribution of LNP preferences. South Brisbane was subsequently won back by Labor at the 2024 election on an 11.40% swing.

== Career after politics ==
Following her exit from state parliament, Trad joined the senior staff of Melbourne-based Australian law firm Slater & Gordon, initially working within government and stakeholder management before becoming General Manager of Class Actions.

In May 2022, Trad was appointed as chairperson of the Gold Coast City Council's Home of the Arts Precinct board, having served as a regular board member for the previous six months.

On 19 August 2025, the Clean Energy Council announced Trad as their new CEO, with board chair Ross Rolfe noting Trad brought to the CEC “a wealth of experience in building consensus across a wide group of stakeholders and a deep understanding of policy development and design.”

== See also ==
- First Palaszczuk Ministry
- Second Palaszczuk Ministry
- 2015 Queensland state election
- 2017 Queensland state election
- 2020 Queensland state election

Political offices
Preceded by Jeff Seeney	Deputy Premier of Queensland; 2015–2020	Succeeded by Steven Miles
Preceded by Curtis Pitt	Treasurer of Queensland; 2017–2020	Succeeded by Cameron Dick
Parliament of Queensland
Preceded by Anna Bligh	Member for South Brisbane; 2012–2020	Succeeded by Amy MacMahon
Party political offices
Preceded by Tim Mulherin	Deputy Leader of the Labor Party in Queensland; 2015–2020	Succeeded by Steven Miles
