= Ministry of Aboriginal Affairs =

Ministry of Aboriginal Affairs, Department of Aboriginal Affairs, or Aboriginal Affairs may refer to:

== Australia ==
Federal

- Minister for Indigenous Australians
- Department of Aboriginal Affairs, in Australia 1972–1990

States and territories

- Aboriginal Affairs NSW, formerly New South Wales Department of Aboriginal Affairs
  - Minister for Aboriginal Affairs (New South Wales)
- Minister for Aboriginal Affairs (Northern Territory)
- Department of Seniors, Disability Services and Aboriginal and Torres Strait Islander Partnerships (Queensland, since 2020)
- Minister for Aboriginal Affairs (South Australia), as of 2022 Kyam Maher
- Department of Aboriginal Affairs (Western Australia), dissolved in 2017
  - Minister for Aboriginal Affairs (Western Australia)

== Canada ==
- Ministry of Aboriginal Affairs (Ontario), later Ministry of Indigenous Affairs
- Ministry of Aboriginal Affairs (Quebec), (French: Secrétariat aux affaires autochtones)
- Minister of Aboriginal and Northern Affairs (Manitoba)
  - Manitoba Aboriginal and Northern Affairs
- Minister of Aboriginal Affairs and Northern Development

== Other uses ==
- Aboriginal Affairs, a 1983 album by American jazz trombonist Craig Harris

== See also ==
- Bureau of Indian Affairs, United States
- Foundation for Aboriginal Affairs, a welfare and advocacy organisation in Sydney, Australia, 1964–1977
