= Second Palaszczuk ministry =

Ministry of the Government of Queensland (2017–2020)

Second Palaszczuk Ministry
- 40th Cabinet of Queensland
- Incumbent
- Date formed: 12 December 2017
- Date dissolved: 12 November 2020

People and organisations
- Monarch: Elizabeth II
- Governor: Paul de Jersey
- Premier: Annastacia Palaszczuk
- Deputy premier: Steven Miles (from May 2020); Jackie Trad (until May 2020)
- No. of ministers: 18
- Member party: Labor
- Status in legislature: Majority Labor Government
- Opposition party: Liberal National
- Opposition leader: Deb Frecklington

History
- Election: 2017 Queensland state election
- Predecessor: Palaszczuk I
- Successor: Palaszczuk III

The Second Palaszczuk Ministry was a ministry of the Government of Queensland led by Annastacia Palaszczuk. Palaszczuk led the Labor Party to a majority victory in the 2017 state election.

== Initial ministry ==
On 11 December 2017, Premier Palaszczuk announced a new line up for the ministry. The ministry was sworn in by then-Governor Paul de Jersey on 12 December 2017. It was made up of nine men and nine women.

| Portfolio | Minister |
|---|---|
| Premier; Minister for Trade | Annastacia Palaszczuk |
| Deputy Premier; Treasurer; Minister for Aboriginal and Torres Strait Islander Partnerships | Jackie Trad |
| Minister for State Development, Infrastructure and Planning; Minister for Manufacturing | Cameron Dick |
| Minister for Innovation; Minister for Tourism Industry Development; Minister for the Commonwealth Games | Kate Jones |
| Attorney-General and Minister for Justice; Leader of the House | Yvette D'Ath |
| Minister for Police; Minister for Corrective Services | Mark Ryan |
| Minister for Agricultural Industry Development and Fisheries | Mark Furner |
| Minister for Natural Resources, Mines and Energy | Anthony Lynham |
| Minister for Transport and Main Roads | Mark Bailey |
| Minister for Health; Minister for Ambulance Services | Steven Miles |
| Minister for Education; Minister for Industrial Affairs | Grace Grace |
| Minister for Disability Services; Minister for Seniors; Minister for Communities | Coralee O'Rourke |
| Minister for Environment and the Great Barrier Reef; Minister for Science; Minister for the Arts | Leeanne Enoch |
| Minister for Employment; Minister for Training and Skills Development; Minister for Small Business | Shannon Fentiman |
| Minister for Housing and Public Works; Minister for Sport; Minister for Digital Technology | Mick de Brenni |
| Minister for Local Government; Minister for Racing; Minister for Multicultural Affairs | Stirling Hinchliffe |
| Minister for Fire and Emergency Services | Craig Crawford |
| Minister for Child Safety, Youth and Women; Minister for the Prevention of Domestic and Family Violence | Di Farmer |
Assistant Ministers
| Assistant Minister of State Assisting the Premier; Assistant Minister for Veteran Affairs | Jennifer Howard |
| Assistant Minister for Treasury | Glenn Butcher |
| Assistant Minister for State Development | Julieanne Gilbert |
| Assistant Minister for Education | Brittany Lauga |
| Assistant Minister for Tourism Industry Development | Meaghan Scanlon |
Parliamentary Roles
| Government Chief Whip | Don Brown |
| Senior Government Whip | Joan Pease |
| Deputy Government Whip | Nikki Boyd |

== May 2020 reshuffle ==
In May 2020, a minor reshuffle occurred following the resignation of Deputy Premier Jackie Trad. Health Minister Steven Miles was appointed Deputy Premier of Queensland, while Cameron Dick was appointed Treasurer of Queensland.

| Portfolio | Minister |
|---|---|
| Premier; Minister for Trade | Annastacia Palaszczuk |
| Deputy Premier; Minister for Health; Minister for Ambulance Services | Steven Miles |
| Treasurer; Minister for Infrastructure and Planning | Cameron Dick |
| Minister for State Development, Tourism, Innovation; Minister for the Commonwealth Games | Kate Jones |
| Attorney-General and Minister for Justice; Leader of the House | Yvette D'Ath |
| Minister for Police; Minister for Corrective Services | Mark Ryan |
| Minister for Agricultural Industry Development and Fisheries | Mark Furner |
| Minister for Natural Resources, Mines and Energy | Anthony Lynham |
| Minister for Transport and Main Roads | Mark Bailey |
| Minister for Education; Minister for Industrial Affairs | Grace Grace |
| Minister for Disability Services; Minister for Seniors; Minister for Communities | Coralee O'Rourke |
| Minister for Environment and the Great Barrier Reef; Minister for Science; Minister for the Arts | Leeanne Enoch |
| Minister for Employment; Minister for Training and Skills Development; Minister for Small Business | Shannon Fentiman |
| Minister for Housing and Public Works; Minister for Sport; Minister for Digital Technology | Mick de Brenni |
| Minister for Local Government; Minister for Racing; Minister for Multicultural Affairs | Stirling Hinchliffe |
| Minister for Fire and Emergency Services; Minister for Torres Strait Islander Partnerships | Craig Crawford |
| Minister for Child Safety, Youth and Women; Minister for the Prevention of Domestic and Family Violence | Di Farmer |
| Minister for Regional Development and Manufacturing | Glenn Butcher |
Assistant Ministers
| Assistant Minister of State Assisting the Premier; Assistant Minister for Veteran Affairs | Jennifer Howard |
| Assistant Minister for Deputy Premier and Health | Nikki Boyd |
| Assistant Minister for State Development | Julieanne Gilbert |
| Assistant Minister for Education | Brittany Lauga |
| Assistant Minister for Tourism Industry Development | Meaghan Scanlon |
Parliamentary Roles
| Government Chief Whip | Don Brown |
| Senior Government Whip | Joan Pease |
| Deputy Government Whip | Kim Richards |

== See also ==
- Shadow ministry of Deb Frecklington

Parliament of Queensland
| Preceded by First Palaszczuk Ministry | Second Palaszczuk Ministry; 2017–2020 | Succeeded by Third Palaszczuk Ministry |
