= Steve Minnikin =

Australian politician

The Honourable Steve Minnikin MP
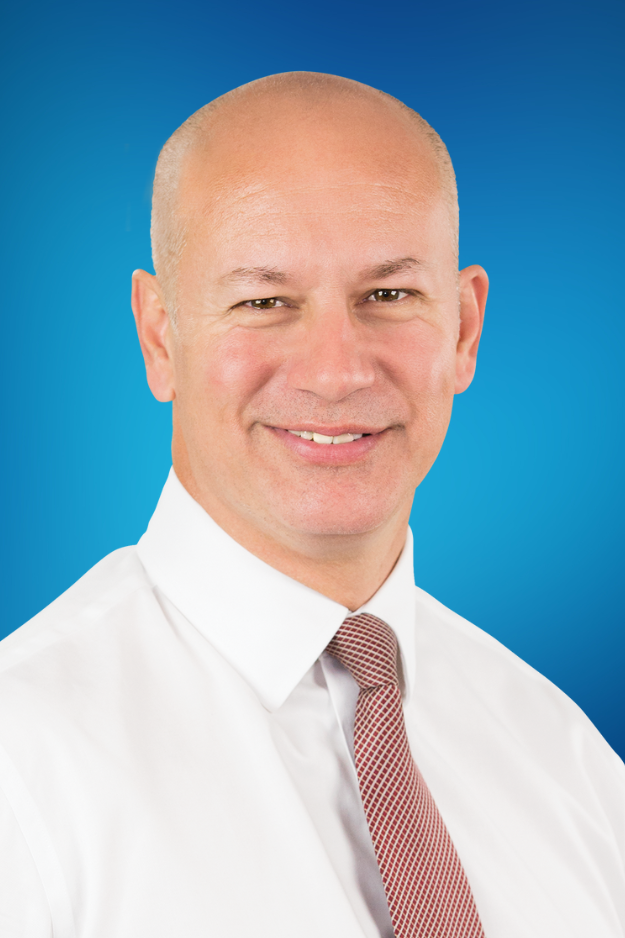

Minister for Customer Services and Open Data and Minister for Small and Family Business
- Incumbent
- Assumed office 1 November 2024
- Leader: David Crisafulli

Member of the Queensland Parliament for Chatsworth
- Incumbent
- Assumed office 24 March 2012
- Preceded by: Steve Kilburn

Shadow Minister for Transport and Main Roads
- In office 15 December 2017 – 28 October 2024
- Leader: Deb Frecklington; David Crisafulli
- Preceded by: Andrew Powell

Shadow Minister for Customer Service
- In office 16 November 2020 – 28 October 2024
- Leader: David Crisafulli
- Preceded by: New Shadow Portfolio

Shadow Minister for Aboriginal and Torres Strait Islander Partnerships and Multicultural Affairs
- In office 9 February 2017 – 14 December 2017
- Leader: Tim Nicholls
- Preceded by: Fiona Simpson
- Succeeded by: John-Paul Langbroek (Multicultural Affairs); Christian Rowan (Aboriginal and Torres Strait Islander Partnerships)

Deputy Opposition Whip
- In office 8 May 2016 – 9 February 2017
- Leader: Tim Nicholls
- Preceded by: Ros Bates
- Succeeded by: Tony Perrett
- In office 14 February 2015 – 22 February 2016
- Leader: Lawrence Springborg
- Preceded by: Desley Scott
- Succeeded by: Ros Bates

Assistant Minister for Public Transport
- In office 3 April 2012 – 14 February 2015
- Premier: Campbell Newman
- Preceded by: Gary Fenlon (as Parliamentary Secretary for Transport, Trade, Employment and Industrial Relations)

Personal details
- Born: Steven James Minnikin; 9 July 1965 (age 61) Brisbane, Queensland
- Party: Liberal National Party
- Education: University of Queensland; Queensland University of Technology
- Profession: National Development Manager and Property Industry

Steven James Minnikin (born 9 July 1965) is an Australian Liberal National politician who is currently serving as the member of the Legislative Assembly of Queensland for Chatsworth, having defeated Steve Kilburn at the 2012 state election. He was appointed Minister for Customer Services and Open Data and Minister for Small and Family Business following the election of the Crisafulli Government on 26 October 2024.

== Early life and education ==
Minnikin was born in Brisbane on the 9 July 1965. He has lived the majority of his life in the Chatsworth electorate and currently resides in Belmont with his family. Growing up in Carina, he attended Carina State School before completing his secondary education at Coorparoo Secondary College. Upon graduating school, he completed his tertiary education at both the University of Queensland and the Queensland University of Technology, where he attained a Bachelor of Business and a Master of Property Economics respectively.

== Career ==
Before his election to Parliament, Minnikin initially worked in local government as an executive officer and customer service manager for the Redland Shire Council. He subsequently went on to work in the property sector, holding several senior roles including State Development Manager for Australand and National Development Manager for the Peninsula Development Group.

== Politics ==
Minnikin was the president of the Queensland Young Liberals from 1992 to 1993 and served on the QLD State Executive of the then Liberal Party during this period.

In the lead up to the 2012 Queensland state election, he defeated future Newman Government Minister Ian Walker and former candidate Andrea Caltabiano for pre-selection to be endorsed as the Liberal National candidate for Chatsworth. Following the election of the Newman Government, he was appointed Assistant Minister for Public Transport on 3 April 2012.

After the defeat of the Newman Government at the 2015 Queensland state election, he was appointed Deputy Opposition Whip by Lawrence Springborg. He held that role until 22 February 2016 when, following his involvement in a failed party leadership coup against Springborg, he was replaced by Ros Bates. He subsequently regained this position three months later following Springborg's defeat in a leadership spill to Tim Nicholls on the 6th of May 2016.

In the lead up to the 2017 Queensland state election he was appointed Shadow Minister for Aboriginal and Torres Strait Islander Partnerships and Multicultural Affairs by Tim Nicholls, replacing the former Shadow Minister Fiona Simpson who had resigned from Shadow Cabinet for personal reasons.

Following the election, Minnikin was appointed Shadow Minister for Transport and Main Roads by the then Opposition Leader Deb Frecklington. He has subsequently continued in this role post the LNP's defeat at the 2020 Queensland state election, while gaining the added portfolio responsibility of Shadow Minister for Customer Service under the leadership of David Crisafulli.

Minnikin was appointed Minister for Customer Services and Open Data and Minister for Small and Family Business following the election of the Crisafulli Government on 26 October 2024. He is responsible for establishing a new Department dedicated to delivering Australia’s most customer service-focused government, including streamlining government services for Queenslanders and small businesses.

== Political positions ==
Minnikin is considered to be from the moderate wing of the Liberal National Party. He is known to be economically conservative, whilst holding 'socially progressive liberal' viewpoints on social issues.

=== Decriminalisation of abortion ===
Alongside of Tim Nicholls and Jann Stuckey he was one of the three LNP politicians who used their conscience vote to support the decriminalisation of abortion in Queensland on 17 October 2018. In his speech to parliament in support of abortion being removed from Queensland's criminal code, Minnikin stated "I believe in the fundamental right of women to be treated as equal members of a free society which acknowledges that, although there are obvious differences in men's and women's physiology, there should be no difference in their opportunity to have sovereign reign over their own bodies".

He further clarified his view on the issue stating, "No-one should be forced to endure a pregnancy they do not want when safe, modern medical options are available to assist them. I am not pro abortion; I am pro choice, pro autonomy, pro respect. I support the right of all Queensland women to make reproductive choices that respect their agency, individuality, desires and dreams. In the 21st century this issue should, indeed, be a health issue and not a criminal issue".

=== Jewish community ===
Minnikin has also been an outspoken advocate for the State of Israel and the broader Jewish community in Australia. He established the Queensland Parliamentary Friends of Israel group in 2013 and has Chaired the organisation ever since. In that capacity he joined a bipartisan Australian parliamentary delegation visiting Israel in January 2020.

== See also ==
- Crisafulli Ministry
- Shadow ministry of David Crisafulli
- Shadow ministry of Deb Frecklington
- Shadow ministry of Tim Nicholls
- Shadow ministry of Lawrence Springborg
- Newman Ministry

Parliament of Queensland
Preceded by Steve Kilburn	Member for Chatsworth; 2012–present	Incumbent
