= Newman ministry =

Ministry of the Queensland Government (2012–2015)

Newman Ministry
- 38th Cabinet of Queensland
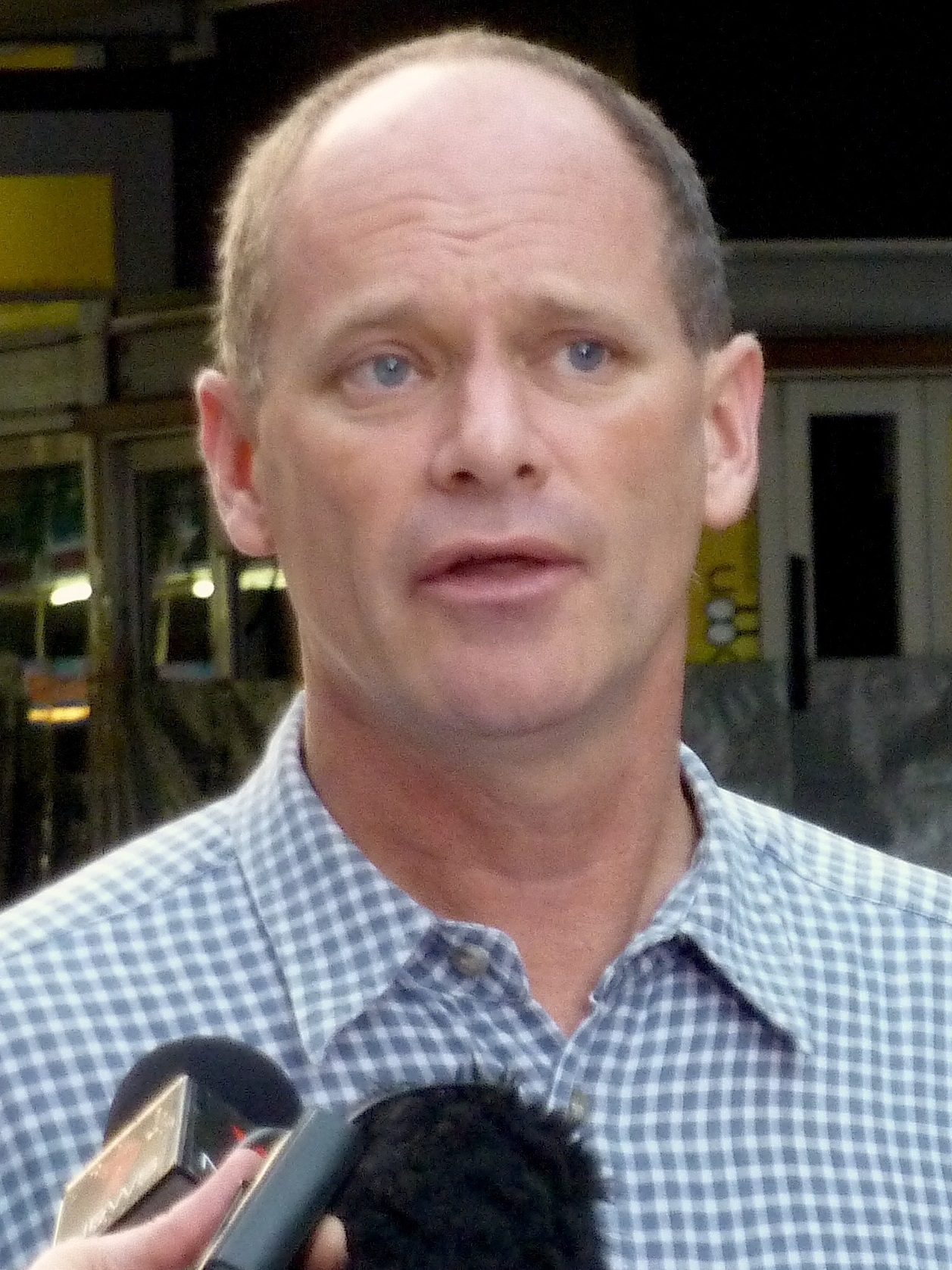
- Premier Campbell Newman, pictured in 2011
- Date formed: 26 March 2012
- Date dissolved: 14 February 2015

People and organisations
- Monarch: Queen Elizabeth II
- Governor: Penelope Wensley; Paul de Jersey
- Premier: Campbell Newman
- Deputy premier: Jeff Seeney
- No. of ministers: 23
- Ministers removed: 3
- Total no. of members: 26
- Member party: Liberal National
- Status in legislature: Majority; 78 / 89
- Opposition party: Labor
- Opposition leader: Annastacia Palaszczuk

History
- Election: 2012
- Outgoing election: 2015
- Predecessor: Bligh
- Successor: Palaszczuk I

Campbell Newman led the Liberal National Party of Queensland to its first victory at the 2012 state election. His interim Ministry of three members was sworn in on 26 March 2012, pending his determination of the make-up of his full Ministry. His replaced the Ministry of Anna Bligh. Following his party's loss at the 2015 state election, Newman soon resigned as Premier to make way for the ministry of Annastacia Palaszczuk.

== Full list ==
Portfolio	Minister	Term
Premier	Campbell Newman	2012–2015
Deputy Premier; Minister for State Development, Infrastructure and Planning	Jeff Seeney	2012–2015
Treasurer; Minister for Trade	Tim Nicholls	2012–2015
Minister for Health	Lawrence Springborg	2012–2015
Minister for Education, Training and Employment	John-Paul Langbroek	2012–2015
Minister for Police and Community Safety	David Gibson	2012
Minister for Police and Community Safety	Jack Dempsey	2012–2013
Minister for Police, Fire and Emergency Services	Jack Dempsey	2013–2015
Attorney-General; Minister for Justice	Jarrod Bleijie	2012–2015
Minister for Transport and Main Roads	Scott Emerson	2012–2015
Minister for Local Government	David Crisafulli	2012–2015
Minister for Local Government, Community Recovery and Resilience	David Crisafulli	2013–2015
Minister for Housing and Public Works	Bruce Flegg	2012
Minister for Housing and Public Works	Tim Mander	2012–2015
Minister for Agriculture, Fisheries and Forestries	John McVeigh	2012–2015
Minister for the Environment and Heritage Protection	Andrew Powell	2012–2015
Minister for Natural Resources and Mines	Andrew Cripps	2012–2015
Minister for Energy and Water Supply	Mark McArdle	2012–2015
Minister for Communities, Child Safety and Disability Services	Tracy Davis	2012–2015
Minister for Science, IT, Innovation and The Arts	Ros Bates	2012–2013
Minister for Science, IT, Innovation and The Arts	Ian Walker	2013–2015
Minister for National Parks, Recreation, Sport and Racing	Steve Dickson	2012–2015
Minister for Tourism, Major Events, Small Business and Commonwealth Games	Jann Stuckey	2012–2015
Minister for Aboriginal and Torres Strait Islander and Multicultural Affairs; Minister assisting the Premier	Jack Dempsey	2012
Minister for Aboriginal and Torres Strait Islander and Multicultural Affairs; Minister assisting the Premier	Glen Elmes from 23 April 2012	2012–2015
Assistant Ministers
Assistant Minister to the Premier of e-government	Ray Stevens	2012–2015
Assistant Minister to the Premier	Deb Frecklington	2014–2015
Assistant Minister for Natural Resources and Mines	Lisa France	2012–2014
Assistant Minister for Natural Resources and Mines	Seath Holswich	2014–2015
Assistant Minister for Sport and Racing	Tim Mander	2012
Assistant Minister for Emergency Volunteers	Ted Malone	2012–2015
Assistant Minister for Health	Chris Davis	2012–2014
Assistant Minister for Tourism	Gavin King	2012–2015
Assistant Minister for Public Transport	Steve Minnikin	2012–2015
Assistant Minister for Child Safety	Rob Molhoek	2012–2013
Assistant Minister for Child Safety	Tarnya Smith	2013–2015
Assistant Minister for Planning Reform	Ian Walker	2012–2013
Assistant Minister for Planning Reform	Rob Molhoek	2013–2015
Assistant Minister for Finance, Administration and Regulatory Reform	Deb Frecklington	2012–2014
Assistant Minister for Finance, Administration and Regulatory Reform	Lisa France	2014–2015
Assistant Minister for Aboriginal and Torres Strait Islander Affairs	David Kempton	2012–2015
Assistant Minister for Technical and Further Education	Saxon Rice	2012–2015
Assistant Minister for Multicultural Affairs	Robert Cavallucci	2012–2015
Parliamentary Roles
Manager of Government Business	Ray Stevens	2012–2015
Government Chief Whip	Vaughan Johnson	2012–2015
Senior Government Whip	Rosemary Menkens	2012–2015
Deputy Government Whip	Ted Sorensen	2012–2015
Deputy Government Whip	Tarnya Smith	2012–2013
Deputy Government Whip	Ian Kaye	2013–2015

== Initial Ministry ==
The members of the first full ministry, sworn in on 3 April 2012, are as follows:

Portfolio	Minister
Premier	Campbell Newman
Deputy Premier; Minister for State Development, Infrastructure and Planning	Jeff Seeney
Treasurer; Minister for Trade	Tim Nicholls
Minister for Health	Lawrence Springborg
Minister for Education, Training and Employment	John-Paul Langbroek
Minister for Police and Community Safety	David Gibson
Attorney-General; Minister for Justice	Jarrod Bleijie
Minister for Transport and Main Roads	Scott Emerson
Minister for Housing and Public Works	Bruce Flegg
Minister for Agriculture, Fisheries and Forestries	John McVeigh
Minister for the Environment and Heritage Protection	Andrew Powell
Minister for Natural Resources and Mines	Andrew Cripps
Minister for Energy and Water Supply	Mark McArdle
Minister for Local Government	David Crisafulli
Minister for Communities, Child Safety and Disability Services	Tracy Davis
Minister for Science, IT, Innovation and The Arts	Ros Bates
Minister for National Parks, Recreation, Sport and Racing	Steve Dickson
Minister for Tourism, Major Events, Small Business and Commonwealth Games	Jann Stuckey
Minister for Aboriginal and Torres Strait Islander and Multicultural Affairs; Minister assisting the Premier	Jack Dempsey
Assistant Ministers
Assistant Minister for Natural Resources and Mines	Lisa France
Assistant Minister for Sport and Racing	Tim Mander
Assistant Minister for Health	Chris Davis
Assistant Minister for Tourism	Gavin King
Assistant Minister for Public Transport	Steve Minnikin
Assistant Minister for Child Safety	Rob Molhoek
Assistant Minister for Planning Reform	Ian Walker
Assistant Minister for Finance, Administration and Regulatory Reform	Deb Frecklington
Assistant Minister for Aboriginal and Torres Strait Islander Affairs	David Kempton
Assistant Minister for Technical and Further Education	Saxon Rice
Assistant Minister for Multicultural Affairs	Robert Cavallucci
Parliamentary Roles
Leader of the House	Ray Stevens
Government Chief Whip	Vaughan Johnson
Senior Government Whip	Rosemary Menkens
Deputy Government Whip	Ted Sorensen
Deputy Government Whip	Tarnya Smith

Changes

- 16 April 2012: David Gibson resigned as Minister for Police and Community Safety, and Jack Dempsey was appointed acting Police Minister. At the same time, it was announced he would be appointed to that post and be replaced as Minister for Aboriginal and Torres Strait Islander Affairs by Glen Elmes, which happened on 23 April 2012.
- 14 November 2012: Bruce Flegg resigned as Minister for Housing and Public Works and Energy and Water Supply Minister Mark McArdle became Acting Housing and Public Works Minister. On 19 November, Tim Mander, then Assistant Minister for Sport and Racing, took over as Minister for Housing and Public Works. Ted Malone became Assistant Minister for Emergency Volunteers.
- 4 February 2013: Following the 2013 Queensland disaster flooding, Newman appointed Local Government Minister David Crisafulli to the new portfolio of Community Recovery and Resilience, in addition to his Local Government responsibilities.
- 15 February 2013: Ros Bates resigned as Minister for Science, IT, Innovation and The Arts, and John-Paul Langbroek (the Education, Training and Employment Minister) became acting minister. On 20 February, Ian Walker took over the portfolio, a promotion from Assistant Minister for Planning Reform. Assistant Minister for Child Safety Rob Molhoek became Assistant Minister for Planning Reform and Deputy Whip Tarnya Smith succeeded him as Assistant Minister for Child Safety.
- 1 November 2013: Following Mike Keelty's Police and Community Safety review, Jack Dempsey had his portfolio responsibilities changed. Corrections was moved to Department of Justice and Attorney-General and ambulances were moved to Department of Health. As a result, Minister Dempsey's title changed to Minister for Police, Fire and Emergency Services and was sworn in by the Governor on 1 November 2013.

== See also ==
- Shadow Ministry of Annastacia Palaszczuk

Preceded by Bligh Ministry	Newman Ministry; 2012–2015	Succeeded by First Palaszczuk Ministry
