= First Palaszczuk ministry =

Ministry of the Government of Queensland (2015–2017)

First Palaszczuk Ministry
- 39th Cabinet of Queensland
- Incumbent
- Date formed: 14 February 2015
- Date dissolved: 11 December 2017

People and organisations
- Monarch: Elizabeth II
- Governor: Paul de Jersey
- Premier: Annastacia Palaszczuk
- Deputy premier: Jackie Trad
- No. of ministers: 17
- Member party: Labor
- Status in legislature: Minority Labor Government
- Opposition party: Liberal National
- Opposition leader: Tim Nicholls

History
- Election: 2015 Queensland state election
- Predecessor: Newman
- Successor: Palaszczuk II

The First Palaszczuk Ministry was a ministry of the Government of Queensland led by Annastacia Palaszczuk. Palaszczuk led the Labor Party to victory in the 2015 state election, forming a minority government with the support of independent MP Peter Wellington. Her interim ministry was sworn in on 14 February 2015 by Governor Paul de Jersey. The full Palaszczuk Ministry was sworn in two days later. Several changes were made to the ministry on 8 December 2015, with 3 cabinet positions and one assistant ministry added.

== Interim ministry ==
The interim ministry, a triumvirate consisting of Annastacia Palaszczuk, Jackie Trad and Curtis Pitt, was sworn in on 14 February 2015. It had only one more member than the First Whitlam Ministry, which was a duumvirate and the smallest ministry in Australia's history.

It was only the second Australian ministry in which both the Premier and Deputy Premier were women; the first was Kristina Keneally and Carmel Tebbutt in New South Wales (4 December 2009 to 28 March 2011).

Portfolio	Minister
Premier; Minister for Education, Training and Employment; Attorney-General; Minister for Justice; Minister for Agriculture, Fisheries and Forestry; Minister for Energy and Water Supply; Minister for Science, Information Technology, Innovation and the Arts; Minister for Tourism, Major Events, Small Business and Commonwealth Games	Annastacia Palaszczuk
Deputy Premier; Minister for State Development, Infrastructure and Planning; Minister for Health; Minister for Transport and Main Roads; Minister for Environment and Heritage Protection; Minister for Local Government, Community Recovery and Resilience; Minister for National Parks, Recreation, Sport and Racing	Jackie Trad
Treasurer; Minister for Trade; Minister for Police, Fire and Emergency Services; Minister for Housing and Public Works; Minister for Natural Resources and Mines; Minister for Communities, Child Safety and Disability Services; Minister for Aboriginal and Torres Strait Islander and Multicultural Affairs; Minister Assisting the Premier	Curtis Pitt

== First full ministry ==
The full ministry was sworn in on 16 February 2015. The full ministry was majority female (8 of 14), a first in Australia.

Portfolio	Minister
Premier; Minister for the Arts	Annastacia Palaszczuk
Deputy Premier; Minister for Transport; Minister for Trade; Minister for Infrastructure, Local Government and Planning	Jackie Trad
Treasurer; Minister for Employment and Industrial Relations; Minister for Aboriginal and Torres Strait Islander Partnerships	Curtis Pitt
Minister for Health; Minister for Ambulance Services	Cameron Dick
Minister for Education; Minister for Tourism, Major Events and Small Business; Minister for the Commonwealth Games	Kate Jones
Minister for State Development; Minister for Natural Resources and Mines	Anthony Lynham
Attorney-General and Minister for Justice; Minister for Training and Skills	Yvette D'Ath
Minister for Police, Fire and Emergency Services; Minister for Corrective Services	Jo-Ann Miller
Minister for Agriculture and Fisheries; Minister for Sport and Racing	Bill Byrne
Minister for Main Roads, Road Safety and Ports; Minister for Energy and Water Supply	Mark Bailey
Minister for Housing and Public Works; Minister for Science and Innovation	Leeanne Enoch
Minister for Environment and Heritage Protection; Minister for National Parks and the Great Barrier Reef	Steven Miles
Minister for Disability Services; Minister for Seniors; Minister Assisting the Premier on North Queensland	Coralee O'Rourke
Minister for Communities, Women and Youth; Minister for Child Safety; Minister for Multicultural Affairs	Shannon Fentiman
Leader of the House; Assistant Minister of State Assisting the Premier	Stirling Hinchliffe
Parliamentary Roles
Government Chief Whip	Mick de Brenni
Senior Government Whip	Linus Power
Deputy Government Whip	Julieanne Gilbert

== First reshuffle ==
On 7 December 2015, Premier Palaszczuk announced several changes to the ministry, including the expansion of cabinet from 14 ministers to 17, and the inclusion of a second assistant minister. The announcement followed the resignation of the Minister for Police, Fire and Emergency Services, Jo-Ann Miller. The new ministry was sworn in at Government House on 8 December 2015. Following the reshuffle, the Palaszczuk Ministry maintained its female majority (9 of 17).

Portfolio	Minister
Premier; Minister for the Arts	Annastacia Palaszczuk
Deputy Premier; Minister for Infrastructure, Local Government and Planning; Minister for Trade and Investment	Jackie Trad
Treasurer; Minister for Aboriginal and Torres Strait Islander Partnerships; Minister for Sport	Curtis Pitt
Minister for Health; Minister for Ambulance Services	Cameron Dick
Minister for Education; Minister for Tourism and Major Events	Kate Jones
Attorney-General and Minister for Justice; Minister for Training and Skills	Yvette D'Ath
Minister for Police, Fire and Emergency Services; Minister for Corrective Services	Bill Byrne
Minister for State Development; Minister for Natural Resources and Mines	Anthony Lynham
Leader of the House; Minister for Transport and the Commonwealth Games	Stirling Hinchliffe
Minister for Main Roads, Road Safety and Ports; Minister for Energy, Biofuels and Water Supply	Mark Bailey
Minister for Environment and Heritage Protection; Minister for National Parks and the Great Barrier Reef	Steven Miles
Minister for Employment and Industrial Relations; Minister for Multicultural Affairs; Minister for Racing	Grace Grace
Minister for Disability Services; Minister for Seniors; Minister Assisting the Premier on North Queensland	Coralee O'Rourke
Minister for Innovation, Science and the Digital Economy; Minister for Small Business	Leeanne Enoch
Minister for Communities, Women and Youth; Minister for Child Safety; Minister for the Prevention of Domestic and Family Violence	Shannon Fentiman
Minister for Agriculture and Fisheries	Leanne Donaldson
Minister for Housing and Public Works	Mick de Brenni
Assistant Ministers
Assistant Minister of State Assisting the Premier	Mark Ryan
Assistant Minister for Local Government	Jennifer Howard
Parliamentary Roles
Government Chief Whip	Chris Whiting
Senior Government Whip	Linus Power
Deputy Government Whip	Julieanne Gilbert

== Second reshuffle ==
On 11 November 2016, Premier Palaszczuk announced several changes to the ministry, following the resignation of the Minister for Agriculture and Fisheries, Leanne Donaldson. Following the reshuffle, the Palaszczuk Ministry lost its female majority (8 of 17).

Portfolio	Minister
Premier; Minister for the Arts	Annastacia Palaszczuk
Deputy Premier; Minister for Infrastructure, Local Government and Planning; Minister for Trade and Investment	Jackie Trad
Treasurer; Minister for Aboriginal and Torres Strait Islander Partnerships; Minister for Sport	Curtis Pitt
Minister for Health; Minister for Ambulance Services	Cameron Dick
Minister for Education; Minister for Tourism and Major Events	Kate Jones
Attorney-General and Minister for Justice; Minister for Training and Skills	Yvette D'Ath
Minister for Police, Fire and Emergency Services; Minister for Corrective Services	Mark Ryan
Minister for State Development; Minister for Natural Resources and Mines	Anthony Lynham
Leader of the House; Minister for Transport and the Commonwealth Games	Stirling Hinchliffe
Minister for Main Roads, Road Safety and Ports; Minister for Energy, Biofuels and Water Supply	Mark Bailey
Minister for Environment and Heritage Protection; Minister for National Parks and the Great Barrier Reef	Steven Miles
Minister for Employment and Industrial Relations; Minister for Multicultural Affairs; Minister for Racing	Grace Grace
Minister for Disability Services; Minister for Seniors; Minister Assisting the Premier on North Queensland	Coralee O'Rourke
Minister for Innovation, Science and the Digital Economy; Minister for Small Business	Leeanne Enoch
Minister for Communities, Women and Youth; Minister for Child Safety; Minister for the Prevention of Domestic and Family Violence	Shannon Fentiman
Minister for Agriculture and Fisheries; Minister for Rural Economic Development	Bill Byrne
Minister for Housing and Public Works	Mick de Brenni
Assistant Ministers
Assistant Minister of State Assisting the Premier	Jennifer Howard
Assistant Minister for Transport and Infrastructure	Glenn Butcher
Parliamentary Roles
Government Chief Whip	Chris Whiting
Senior Government Whip	Linus Power
Deputy Government Whip	Julieanne Gilbert

== Third reshuffle ==
On 10 February 2017, Premier Palaszczuk announced several changes to the ministry, following the resignation of the Minister for Transport, Stirling Hinchliffe.

Portfolio	Minister
Premier; Minister for the Arts	Annastacia Palaszczuk
Deputy Premier; Minister for Transport; Minister for Infrastructure, Local Government and Planning	Jackie Trad
Treasurer; Minister for Trade and Investment	Curtis Pitt
Minister for Health; Minister for Ambulance Services	Cameron Dick
Minister for Education; Minister for Tourism, Major Events and the Commonwealth Games	Kate Jones
Attorney-General and Minister for Justice; Minister for Training and Skills	Yvette D'Ath
Minister for Police, Fire and Emergency Services; Minister for Correctional Services.	Mark Ryan
Minister for Agriculture and Fisheries; Minister for Rural Economic Development	Bill Byrne
Minister for State Development; Minister for Natural Resources and Mines	Anthony Lynham
Minister for Main Roads, Road Safety and Ports; Minister for Energy, Biofuels and Water Supply	Mark Bailey
Minister for Environment and Heritage Protection; Minister for National Parks and the Great Barrier Reef	Steven Miles
Minister for Employment and Industrial Relations; Minister for Multicultural Affairs; Minister for Racing	Grace Grace
Minister for Disability Services; Minister for Seniors; Minister Assisting the Premier on North Queensland	Coralee O'Rourke
Minister for Innovation, Science and the Digital Economy; Minister for Small Business	Leeanne Enoch
Minister for Communities, Women and Youth; Minister for Child Safety; Minister for the Prevention of Domestic and Family Violence	Shannon Fentiman
Minister for Housing and Public Works; Minister for Sport	Mick de Brenni
Minister for Local Government; Minister for Aboriginal and Torres Strait Islander Partnerships	Mark Furner
Assistant Ministers
Assistant Minister of State Assisting the Premier	Jennifer Howard
Assistant Minister for Transport and Infrastructure	Glenn Butcher
Parliamentary Roles
Leader of the House	Stirling Hinchliffe
Government Chief Whip	Chris Whiting
Senior Government Whip	Linus Power
Deputy Government Whip	Julieanne Gilbert

== See also ==
- Shadow ministry of Annastacia Palaszczuk
- Shadow ministry of Lawrence Springborg
- Shadow ministry of Tim Nicholls

Parliament of Queensland
Preceded by Newman Ministry	First Palaszczuk Ministry; 2015–2017	Succeeded by Second Palaszczuk Ministry
