= Cameron Dick =

Australian politician (born 1967)

The Honourable Cameron Dick MP
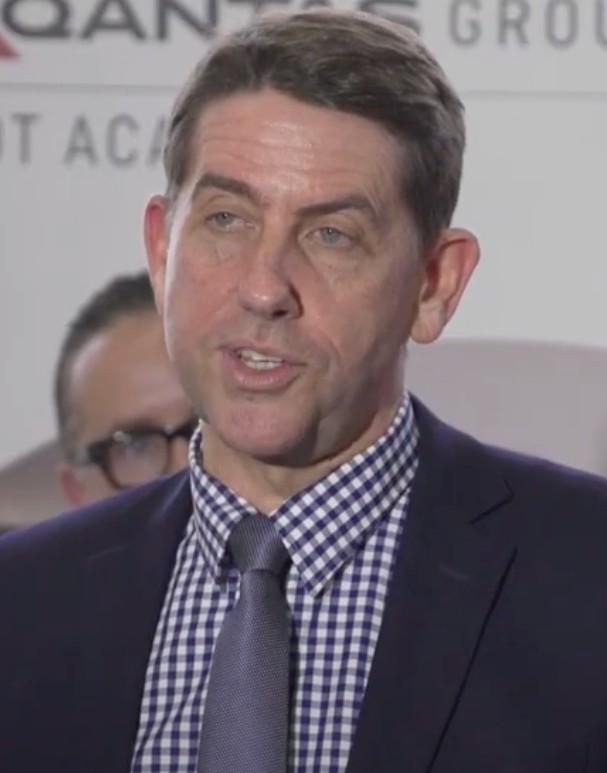
- Dick in September 2018

Deputy Leader of the Opposition in Queensland
- Incumbent
- Assumed office 28 October 2024
- Leader: Steven Miles
- Preceded by: Jarrod Bleijie

Shadow Minister for State Development, Infrastructure, Planning and Regional Development
- Incumbent
- Assumed office 8 November 2024
- Leader: Steven Miles
- Preceded by: Jarrod Bleijie (as Shadow Minister for State Development, Infrastructure and Planning); Deb Frecklington (as Shadow Minister for Regional Development and Manufacturing)

36th Deputy Premier of Queensland
- In office 15 December 2023 – 28 October 2024
- Premier: Steven Miles
- Preceded by: Steven Miles
- Succeeded by: Jarrod Bleijie

Deputy Leader of the Labor Party in Queensland
- Incumbent
- Assumed office 15 December 2023
- Leader: Steven Miles
- Preceded by: Steven Miles
Ministerial positions
51st Treasurer of Queensland
In office 11 May 2020 – 28 October 2024
Premier	Annastacia Palaszczuk; Steven Miles
Deputy	Charis Mullen (2020–2023); Jennifer Howard (2023-2024)
Preceded by	Jackie Trad
Succeeded by	David Janetzki
Minister for Trade and Investment of Queensland
In office 7 October 2021 – 28 October 2024
Premier	Annastacia Palaszczuk; Steven Miles
Preceded by	Annastacia Palaszczuk (as Minister for Trade); Himself (as Minister for Investment)
Succeeded by	Rosslyn Bates
Minister for Investment of Queensland
In office 12 November 2020 – 7 October 2021
Premier	Annastacia Palaszczuk
Preceded by	Kate Jones (as Minister for Innovation)
Succeeded by	Himself (as Minister for Trade and Investment)
Minister for Infrastructure and Planning of Queensland
In office 12 December 2017 – 12 November 2020
Premier	Annastacia Palaszczuk
Preceded by	Jackie Trad
Succeeded by	Steven Miles
Minister for State Development of Queensland
In office 12 December 2017 – 11 May 2020
Premier	Annastacia Palaszczuk
Preceded by	Anthony Lynham
Succeeded by	Kate Jones
Minister for Manufacturing of Queensland
In office 12 December 2017 – 10 May 2020
Premier	Annastacia Palaszczuk
Succeeded by	Glenn Butcher
Minister for Health and Ambulance Services of Queensland
In office 16 February 2015 – 12 December 2017
Premier	Annastacia Palaszczuk
Preceded by	Lawrence Springborg
Succeeded by	Steven Miles
Minister for Industrial Relations of Queensland
In office 26 March 2009 – 26 March 2012
Premier	Anna Bligh
Preceded by	John Mickel
Succeeded by	Curtis Pitt (2015)
Minister for Education of Queensland
In office 21 February 2011 – 26 March 2012
Premier	Anna Bligh
Preceded by	Geoff Wilson
Succeeded by	John-Paul Langbroek
Attorney-General of Queensland
In office 26 March 2009 – 21 February 2011
Premier	Anna Bligh
Preceded by	Kerry Shine
Succeeded by	Paul Lucas
Parliamentary offices
Member of the Queensland Parliament for Greenslopes
In office 21 March 2009 – 24 March 2012
Preceded by	Gary Fenlon
Succeeded by	Ian Kaye
Member of the Queensland Parliament for Woodridge
Incumbent
Assumed office 31 January 2015
Preceded by	Desley Scott

Personal details
- Born: 25 April 1967 (age 59) Brisbane, Queensland
- Party: Labor
- Children: 2
- Education: Trinity Hall, Cambridge; University of Queensland
- Profession: Barrister

Cameron Robert Dick (born 25 April 1967) is an Australian politician and member of the Labor Party who was the 36th Deputy Premier of Queensland from 2023 to 2024, 51st Treasurer of the state of Queensland from 2020 to 2024, and Minister for Trade and Investment from 2021 to 2024. He is currently a member of the Queensland Legislative Assembly representing the seat of Woodridge.

Dick previously served as Minister for State Development, Manufacturing, Infrastructure and Planning and was Minister for Health and Minister for Ambulance Services in the Palaszczuk Ministry. He also served as Attorney-General, Minister for Education and Minister for Industrial Relations in the Bligh government.

== Early life and education ==
Dick's family arrived in Queensland from Scotland in 1862 aboard the sailing ship Conway. His father, a veteran of the Second World War serving in the Royal Australian Navy (1941–1945), was a butcher and later an owner and operator of taxi cabs. His mother was a nurse.

Dick was born on 25 April 1967. He grew up in the suburb of Holland Park and attended a local primary school, Marshall Road State School.

Dick was educated at the Anglican Church Grammar School. He studied at the University of Queensland, and graduated with a Bachelor of Commerce and a Bachelor of Laws, and later, a Bachelor of Arts. He gained a Master of Law (LLM) degree at Trinity Hall, Cambridge.

After undertaking articles of clerkship at Brisbane law firm Goss Downey Carne, he was admitted as a solicitor of the Supreme Court of Queensland and the High Court of Australia.

== Legal career ==
=== Tuvalu ===
Following practice as a solicitor in Brisbane, Dick worked as an international development volunteer in the South Pacific island nation of Tuvalu from 1993 to 1996, under the Australian Volunteers Abroad program operated by the then Overseas Service Bureau (now known as Australian Volunteers International), Australia's oldest international volunteer-sending organisation. Dick assisted in the Office of the Attorney-General during his time in Tuvalu, initially as Crown Counsel and then as the acting Attorney-General of Tuvalu for one year. He is a former ex officio Attorney-General of the Pacific Island nation of Tuvalu.

=== Queensland ===
Dick was a solicitor at Crown Law, the Queensland Government's legal office, and a senior advisor in the Queensland Government, before becoming a barrister in 2006. He practised law prior to his election to the Queensland Parliament.

== Political career ==
Dick was elected as the Member for Greenslopes in the Queensland Parliament at the 2009 Queensland state election. Queensland Premier Anna Bligh asked him to serve as the Attorney-General and Minister for Industrial Relations and was sworn in on 26 March 2009. On 21 February 2011 he was sworn in as Minister for Education and Industrial Relations. He lost his seat at the 2012 state election. He gained a new seat, Woodridge, at the 2015 state election, and did so with the largest two-party preferred vote (75.95 per cent) of any party in any electorate of Queensland.

On 16 February 2015, Dick was sworn in as Minister for Health and Ambulance Services in the Palaszczuk Ministry.

On 12 December 2017, Dick was sworn in as Minister for State Development, Manufacturing, Infrastructure and Planning in the second Palaszczuk Ministry.

Alongside Queensland Premier Annastacia Palaszczuk and representatives from the Australian Government, including then Prime Minister Malcolm Turnbull, Dick was part of the announcement on 14 March 2018 that Rheinmetall Defence Australia would be awarded the $5 billion LAND 400 contract to build and service up to 5000 military vehicles in Queensland. Regarding the decision, Dick called the "landmark project" an "economic game-changer" that will create "450 advanced manufacturing and engineering jobs for Queenslanders" and "pump $1 billion into the state’s economy" in its first ten years of operation. Following this, Rheinmetall selected Redbank, near Ipswich, as the location for its $170 million Military Vehicle Centre of Excellence (MILVEHCOE). The first sod was turned at the facility 16 November 2018, with reference made to Queensland as "Australia's khaki state".

Dick was in attendance to press the launch button for Australia's first commercial payload rocket flight on 21 November 2018. The five-metre rocket was developed by Queensland-based BlackSky Aerospace and successfully launched into the sky from a farm in Tarawara, west of Goondiwindi. Dick said that the launch – which saw the rocket reach roughly the same height as Mount Everest – showed the possibilities for developing a space industry in Queensland. He added that the state wanted to promote its aerospace capabilities to national and international markets, and that this launch was a substantial step forward in achieving that aim.

In May 2020, Dick replaced Jackie Trad as Queensland Treasurer.

On 28 October 2024, Dick was replaced as Deputy Premier and Treasurer of Queensland.

== Personal life ==
Dick is married and has two sons.

He is the brother of Milton Dick, a member of the Australian House of Representatives for Oxley, Speaker of the House of Representatives and former Brisbane City Council Labor leader.

== See also ==
- Bligh ministry
- First Palaszczuk ministry
- Second Palaszczuk ministry
- Third Palaszczuk ministry
- Political families of Australia

Political offices
Preceded by Jackie Trad	Treasurer of Queensland; 2020–2024	Succeeded by David Janetzki
Preceded by Steven Miles	Deputy Premier of Queensland; 2023–2024	Succeeded by Jarrod Bleijie
Parliament of Queensland
Preceded by Gary Fenlon	Member for Greenslopes; 2009–2012	Succeeded by Ian Kaye
Preceded by Desley Scott	Member for Woodridge; 2015–present	Incumbent
Party political offices
Preceded by Steven Miles	Deputy Leader of the Labor Party in Queensland; 2023–present	Incumbent
