= Mick de Brenni =

Member of the Queensland Legislative Assembly for Springwood

The Honourable Mick de Brenni MP
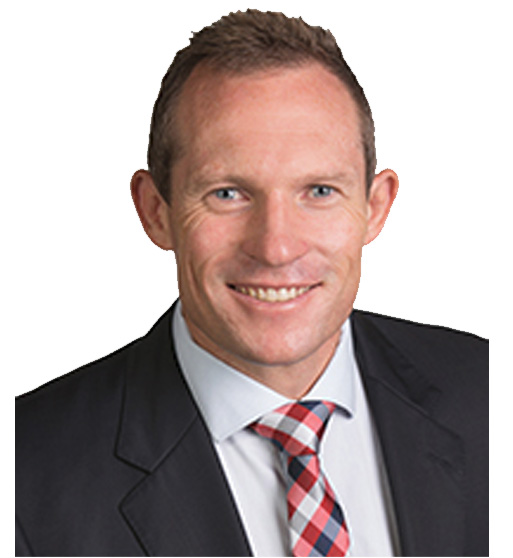

Manager of Opposition Business in the House (Queensland)
- Incumbent
- Assumed office 8 November 2024
- Leader: Steven Miles
- Preceded by: Andrew Powell

Minister for Energy and Clean Economy Jobs of Queensland
- In office 18 December 2023 – 28 October 2024
- Premier: Steven Miles
- Preceded by: Himself (as Minister for Energy, Renewables and Hydrogen)
- Succeeded by: David Janetzki

Minister for Energy, Renewables and Hydrogen of Queensland
- In office 12 November 2020 – 18 December 2023
- Premier: Annastacia Palaszczuk; Steven Miles
- Preceded by: Anthony Lynham (Energy)
- Succeeded by: Himself (as Minister for Clean Economy and Jobs)

Minister for Sport of Queensland
- In office 10 February 2017 – 12 November 2020
- Premier: Annastacia Palaszczuk
- Preceded by: Curtis Pitt
- Succeeded by: Stirling Hinchliffe

Minister for Public Works and Procurement of Queensland
- In office 8 December 2015 – 18 December 2023
- Premier: Annastacia Palaszczuk
- Preceded by: Leeanne Enoch
- Succeeded by: Meaghan Scanlon (as Minister for Public Works)

Minister for Housing of Queensland
- In office 8 December 2015 – 12 November 2020
- Premier: Annastacia Palaszczuk
- Preceded by: Leeanne Enoch
- Succeeded by: Leeanne Enoch

Queensland Government Chief Whip
- In office 19 February 2015 – 16 February 2016
- Premier: Annastacia Palaszczuk
- Preceded by: Vaughan Johnson
- Succeeded by: Chris Whiting

Member of the Queensland Legislative Assembly for Springwood
- Incumbent
- Assumed office 31 January 2015
- Preceded by: John Grant

Personal details
- Born: Michael Christopher de Brenni; 8 February 1978 (age 48) Brisbane, Queensland, Australia
- Party: Labor
- Spouse: Kristie de Brenni
- Children: 2
- Education: Griffith University
- Occupation: Trade unionist
- Website: www.mickdebrenni.com.au

Michael Christopher de Brenni, is an Australian politician currently serving as the Manager of Opposition Business in the Legislative Assembly of Queensland.

Born 8 February 1978, he attended Redeemer Lutheran College before going on to Griffith University, where he graduated with a Bachelor of Commerce.

Prior to his election to the Queensland Parliament, he served as a member of the trade union movement, working as the campaigns officer for the Queensland Council of Unions.

He previously served as the Minister for Energy and Clean Economy Jobs, Minister for Energy, Renewables and Hydrogen and Minister for Public Works and Procurement, and the Minister for Housing and Public Works, Minister for Sport and Minister for Digital Technology.

He has been the Labor member for Springwood in the Queensland Legislative Assembly since 2015.

He served as the Chief Government Whip from the 19 February 2015 to 8 December 2015.

== See also ==
- First Palaszczuk Ministry
- Second Palaszczuk Ministry
- Third Palaszczuk Ministry

Parliament of Queensland
Preceded by John Grant	Member for Springwood; 2015–present	Incumbent
