= Department of Aboriginal and Torres Strait Islander Partnerships =

State government department in Queensland, Australia

The Department of Aboriginal and Torres Strait Islander Partnerships was a department of the Queensland Government responsible for whole-of-government policy and service delivery for Aboriginal Australians and Torres Strait Islanders. Following machinery-of-government changes in 2020, it became part of the Department of Seniors, Disability Services and Aboriginal and Torres Strait Islander Partnerships.
