= Stirling Hinchliffe =

Australian politician (born 1970)

The Honourable Stirling Hinchliffe
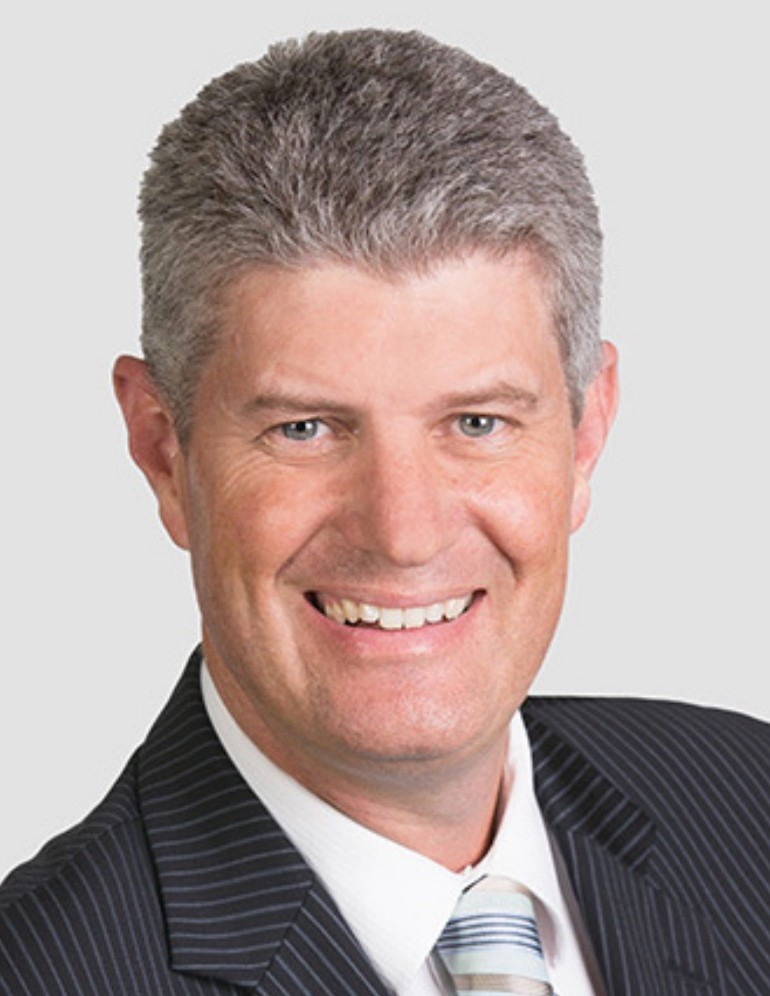
- Hinchliffe in 2015

Consul-General of Australia in Auckland
- Incumbent
- Assumed office 23 February 2026
- Prime Minister: Anthony Albanese
- Minister: Don Farrell
- Preceded by: Brad Williams

Minister for Tourism, Innovation and Sport Minister Assisting the Premier on Olympics and Paralympics Sport and Engagement
- In office 12 November 2020 – 18 December 2023
- Premier: Annastacia Palaszczuk; Steven Miles
- Preceded by: Kate Jones (Tourism Industry Development and Innovation) Mick de Brenni (Sport)
- Succeeded by: Michael Healy (as Minister for Tourism and Sport); Leanne Linard (as Minister for Innovation and Science)

Minister for Local Government, Racing and Multicultural Affairs
- In office 12 December 2017 – 12 November 2020
- Premier: Annastacia Palaszczuk
- Preceded by: Mark Furner (Local Government) Grace Grace (Racing, Multicultural Affairs)
- Succeeded by: Steven Miles (Local Government) Grace Grace (Racing) Leanne Linard (Multicultural Affairs)

Minister for Transport and the Commonwealth Games
- In office 8 December 2015 – 6 February 2017
- Premier: Annastacia Palaszczuk
- Preceded by: Jackie Trad (Transport) Kate Jones (Commonwealth Games)
- Succeeded by: Jackie Trad (Transport) Kate Jones (Commonwealth Games)
Other offices held
Assistant Minister of State Assisting the Premier of Queensland
In office 16 February 2015 – 8 December 2015
Premier	Annastacia Palaszczuk
Preceded by	Glen Elmes (Minister assisting the Premier of Queensland)
Succeeded by	Mark Ryan
Leader of the House of Queensland
In office 16 February 2015 – 11 December 2017
Premier	Annastacia Palaszczuk
Preceded by	Ray Stevens
Succeeded by	Yvette D'Ath
Minister for Mining of Queensland
In office 21 February 2012 – 26 March 2012
Preceded by	Stephen Robertson (Mines)
Succeeded by	Andrew Cripps (Mines)
Minister for Employment and Skills of Queensland
In office 21 February 2011 – 26 March 2011
Preceded by	Andrew Fraser (Employment)
Succeeded by	John-Paul Langbroek (Training and Employment)
Minister for Infrastructure and Planning of Queensland
In office 26 March 2009 – 21 February 2011
Preceded by	Paul Lucas
Succeeded by	Paul Lucas (as Minister for Local Government)

Member of the Queensland Parliament for Stafford
- In office 9 September 2006 – 24 March 2012
- Preceded by: Terry Sullivan
- Succeeded by: Chris Davis

Member of the Queensland Parliament for Sandgate
- In office 31 January 2015 – 26 October 2024
- Preceded by: Kerry Millard
- Succeeded by: Bisma Asif

Personal details
- Born: 23 November 1970 (age 55) Dalby, Queensland
- Party: Labor
- Spouse: Megan Clarke
- Children: 3
- Education: University of Queensland
- Website: www.stirlinghinchliffe.com

Stirling James Hinchliffe (born 23 November 1970) is an Australian diplomat and former politician.

== Early life ==
Born in Dalby, Queensland, he was educated at Craigslea State School and Craigslea State High School and received a Bachelor of Arts from the University of Queensland.

He was a property industry analyst, policy manager, policy advisor and executive officer before his entry into politics. Hinchliffe's long involvement with the Australian Labor Party included a position as national secretary of Young Labor.

== Parliamentary career ==
In the 2006 Queensland state election, he was elected to the safe Labor seat of Stafford, which he represented until being defeated in the 2012 Queensland state election, losing to the LNP's Chris Davis. Hinchliffe served as a cabinet minister in the Bligh ministry.

Hinchliffe returned to parliament in 2015 as the member for Sandgate. He was sworn in as Assistant Minister of State Assisting the Premier in the Palaszczuk ministry on 16 February 2015. He was also nominated as Leader of the House, an appointment confirmed when the Legislative Assembly of Queensland met for the first time following the election.

In December 2015, he was elevated to Minister for Transport and the Commonwealth Games.

In February 2017, he resigned as the Minister for Transport and the Commonwealth Games following an ongoing series of railway passenger services being cancelled due to there being an insufficient number of train drivers, a situation exacerbated by the opening in 2016 of the Redcliffe Peninsula railway line. Hinchliffe's resignation came despite a commission of inquiry not attributing any blame to him, finding that the difficulties were a result of structural and cultural problems within Queensland Rail.

Following the 2017 state election, Hinchliffe re-entered Cabinet as the Minister for Local Government, Minister for Racing and Minister for Multicultural Affairs. He was charged with responding to a number of integrity issues with the local government sector in Queensland, culminating in him dismissing the entire Ipswich and Logan City Councils. He also oversaw the return of racing to the Eagle Farm Racecourse after extensive track remediation, and has increased funding to multicultural community groups across Queensland.

Following the re-election of the Palaszczuk government in 2020, Hinchliffe was appointed as the Minister for Tourism Industry Development, Innovation and Minister for Sport. On 7 October, following Brisbane's successful bid for the 2032 Olympic Games, Premier Annastacia Palaszczuk made a minor reshuffle to her Cabinet. This resulted in Stirling's portfolio being tweaked to become the Minister for Tourism, Innovation and Sport and Minister Assisting the Premier on Olympics and Paralympics Sport and Engagement.

In October 2023, Hinchliffe confirmed he would not be contesting the 2024 Queensland state election, opting to retire to spend more time with his family. After this election, he was succeeded by Bisma Asif.

== Post-parliamentary career ==
In May 2025, Hinchliffe took on the role of Director of Strategy Development at Northern Australia Accommodation Solutions. He currently serves as a volunteer member of the Basketball Queensland Board of Directors. In February 2026, Hinchliffe was appointed as Australia's Consul General in Auckland, New Zealand.

Political offices
Preceded by Ray Stevens	Leader of the House of the Legislative Assembly of Queensland; 2015–2017	Succeeded by Yvette D'Ath
Parliament of Queensland
Preceded by Terry Sullivan	Member for Stafford; 2006-2012	Succeeded by Chris Davis
Preceded by Kerry Millard	Member for Sandgate; 2015-2024	Succeeded by Bisma Asif
