= Leeanne Enoch =

Australian politician

The Honourable Leeanne Enoch MP
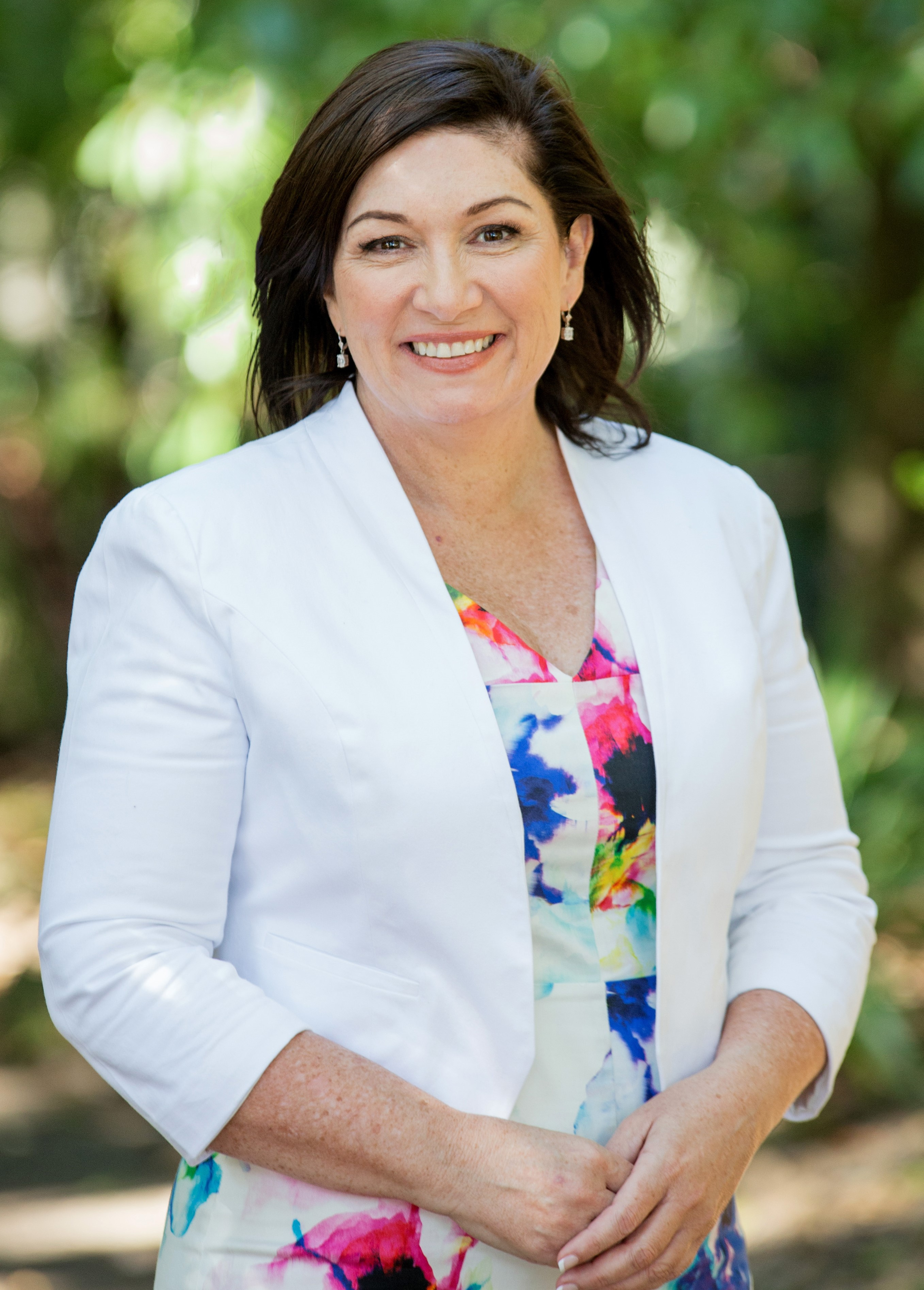

Minister for Treaty, Minister for Aboriginal and Torres Strait Islander Partnerships, Minister for Communities and Minister for the Arts of Queensland
- In office 12 November 2020 – 18 May 2023
- Premier: Annastacia Palaszczuk
- Preceded by: Coralee O'Rourke (Communities); Mick de Brenni (Housing)
- Succeeded by: Herself (as Minister for Communities); Meaghan Scanlon (as Minister for Housing)

Minister for the Arts of Queensland
- In office 12 December 2017 – 28 October 2024
- Premier: Annastacia Palaszczuk; Steven Miles
- Preceded by: Annastacia Palaszczuk

Minister for Environment and the Great Barrier Reef of Queensland
- In office 12 December 2017 – 12 November 2020
- Premier: Annastacia Palaszczuk
- Preceded by: Steven Miles
- Succeeded by: Meaghan Scanlon

Minister for Innovation, Science and the Digital Economy of Queensland
- In office 16 February 2015 – 12 December 2017
- Premier: Annastacia Palaszczuk
- Preceded by: Ian Walker
- Succeeded by: Kate Jones (Innovation); Mick de Brenni (Digital Technology)

Minister for Small Business of Queensland
- In office 8 December 2015 – 12 December 2017
- Premier: Annastacia Palaszczuk
- Preceded by: Kate Jones
- Succeeded by: Shannon Fentiman

Minister for Housing and Public Works of Queensland
- In office 16 February 2015 – 8 December 2015
- Premier: Annastacia Palaszczuk
- Preceded by: Tim Mander
- Succeeded by: Mick de Brenni

Member of the Queensland Legislative Assembly for Algester
- Incumbent
- Assumed office 31 January 2015
- Preceded by: Anthony Shorten

Personal details
- Party: Labor
- Children: 2
- Education: Griffith University; University of East London
- Occupation: Teacher
- Website: www.leeanneenoch.com

Leeanne Margaret Enoch is an Australian politician currently serving as the Labor member for Algester in the Queensland Legislative Assembly since 2015. Prior to the 2024 Queensland election, she served as a Minister in the Palaszczuk and Miles governments, most recently as Minister for Treaty, Minister for Aboriginal and Torres Strait Islander Partnerships, Minister for Communities and Minister for the Arts.

Enoch is an Aboriginal Australian of the Quandamooka peoples of North Stradbroke Island, and was the first Indigenous Australian woman elected to the Queensland Parliament.

== Early life and education ==
Enoch was born the oldest of four, and became the first member of her family to graduate from university. She is the elder sister of playwright Wesley Enoch, who is the second born after Leeanne and older than his two brothers.

== Career ==
Enoch worked as a high school English and drama teacher in schools across South-East Queensland and East London, later becoming a manager of Aboriginal and Torres Strait Islander policy in the State Education Department.

Upon her election to the Queensland Parliament in 2015, Enoch became a first-term cabinet minister, becoming Minister for Housing and Public Works and Minister for Science and Innovation. Her department launched the Advance Queensland initiative in June 2015, in a drive to create jobs in new and emerging industries. The Advance Queensland Expert Panel is an independent panel created to provide advice to government.

She served as Minister for Environment and the Great Barrier Reef, Minister for Science, and Minister for Housing and Public Works (c. 2017).

As of May 2023, Enoch serves as the Minister for Treaty, Minister for Aboriginal and Torres Strait Islander Partnerships, Minister for Communities and Minister for the Arts.

== Other activities ==
Enoch was a witness in Eatock v Bolt, a 2011 decision of the Federal Court of Australia which held that two articles written by columnist and commentator Andrew Bolt and published in The Herald Sun newspaper had contravened section 18C, of the Racial Discrimination Act 1975. Bolt had accused Enoch and other Aboriginal people of "choosing" their identity for personal benefit.

== See also ==
- List of Indigenous Australian politicians
- Women in the Queensland Legislative Assembly
- First Palaszczuk Ministry
- Second Palaszczuk Ministry
- Third Palaszczuk Ministry
- Miles ministry

Parliament of Queensland
Preceded by Anthony Shorten	Member for Algester; 2015–present	Incumbent
