= Tim Mander =

Australian politician

The Honourable Tim Mander MP

Shadow Minister for Housing and Public Works Shadow Minister for Sport and Racing
- In office 16 November 2020 – 28 October 2024
- Leader: David Crisafulli
- Preceded by: Michael Hart (Housing and Public Works); John-Paul Langbroek (Sport and Racing)

Deputy Leader of the Opposition in Queensland Deputy Leader of the Liberal National Party
- In office 12 December 2017 – 12 November 2020
- Leader: Deb Frecklington
- Preceded by: Deb Frecklington
- Succeeded by: David Janetzki

Shadow Treasurer of Queensland
- In office 15 December 2017 – 12 November 2020
- Leader: Deb Frecklington
- Preceded by: Scott Emerson
- Succeeded by: David Janetzki

Shadow Minister for Police, Fire and Emergency Services, Shadow Minister for Corrective Services
- In office 6 May 2016 – 15 December 2017
- Leader: Tim Nicholls
- Preceded by: Jarrod Bleijie
- Succeeded by: Trevor Watts (Police and Corrective Services); Lachlan Millar (Fire and Emergency Services)

Shadow Minister for Education & Training
- In office 14 February 2015 – 6 May 2016
- Leader: Lawrence Springborg
- Preceded by: Anthony Lynham (Education); Yvette D'Ath (Training)
- Succeeded by: Tracy Davis

Minister for Housing and Public Works of Queensland
- In office 19 November 2012 – 14 February 2015
- Premier: Campbell Newman
- Preceded by: Bruce Flegg
- Succeeded by: Leeanne Enoch

Member of the Queensland Parliament for Everton
- Incumbent
- Assumed office 24 March 2012
- Preceded by: Murray Watt

Personal details
- Born: 9 August 1961 (age 65) Brisbane, Queensland, Australia
- Party: Liberal National Party
- Occupation: Rugby league referee, Politician

Timothy Leonard Mander (born 9 August 1961) is an Australian politician and a former leading Australian rugby league referee. He is a Member of the Queensland Legislative Assembly. Mander was the Deputy Leader of the Opposition and Deputy Leader of the Liberal National Party of Queensland.

== Early Life ==
A Christian and bible college graduate, Mander was the CEO of Scripture Union Queensland.

Mander controlled the National Rugby League (NRL) grand final in 2004 and 2005. He refereed a total of 291 first grade games between 1992 and 2005. He was also an NRL video referee.

Honours awarded to Mander include 2005 International Referee of the Year and 2005 Queensland Father of the Year.

== Political Career ==
Mander is the member of the Legislative Assembly of Queensland for Everton, having been elected at the 2012 Queensland state election by defeating Labor's Murray Watt (the Parliamentary Secretary to the Treasurer). Mander was appointed Assistant Minister for Sport and Racing on 3 April 2012. He was promoted to Minister of Housing and Public Works on 19 November 2012, following the resignation of Bruce Flegg.

Following poor opinion polling for LNP leader Lawrence Springborg, Mander initiated a leadership challenge against him, and former Treasurer Tim Nicholls also nominated for the position. In the first round, Mander received only 10 votes, against Nicholls' 14 and Springborg's 17, and was therefore eliminated. Nicholls eventually prevailed with 22 votes to Springborg's 19 and was sworn in as Opposition Leader on 6 May 2016.

After the LNP lost the 2017 state election, Mander was elected deputy LNP leader, under leader Deb Frecklington.

On 1 May 2026, The Australian newspaper revealed that Queensland Premier David Crisafulli had been warned by a family relation of Mander's wife Gayle in June 2025, that the 64-year-old Tim Mander and 47-year-old fellow minister Amanda Camm had participated in a two-year-long extramarital affair, before Mander left Gayle. Journalists reported that a member of the Liberal National Party of Queensland had also warned the future Premier about the affair in a phone call in December 2023 and that it had been an open secret in the Party as early as February 2022.

On 19 May 2026 the Australian Electoral Commissioner referred Mander to the Australian Federal Police because he had enrolled to vote at the address of a staff member but had not provided the AEC with evidence that he had resided there. Deputy Opposition leader Cameron Dick demanded that Mander be stood down by Premier Crisafulli. Crisafulli made no statement on the referral until 21 May 2026, when Mander voluntarily stood down from Cabinet. Tourism Minister Andrew Powell took on Mander's ministerial duties for the Sport and Olympics portfolios.

Parliament of Queensland
Preceded by Murray Watt	Member for Everton; 2012–present	Incumbent
Political offices
Preceded by Bruce Flegg	Minister for Housing and Public Works; 2012–2015	Succeeded by Leeanne Enoch
