= John-Paul Langbroek =

Australian politician

The Honourable John-Paul Langbroek MP
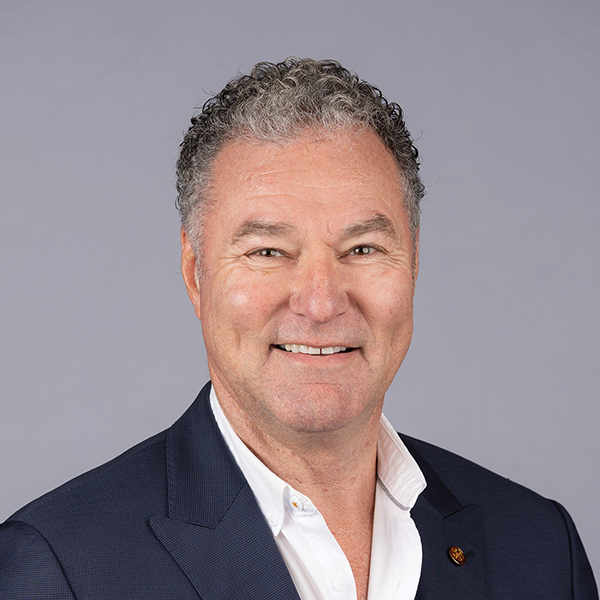

Minister for Education and Minister for the Arts of Queensland
- Incumbent
- Assumed office 1 November 2024
- Leader: David Crisafulli
- Preceded by: Di Farmer (Education); Leeanne Enoch (Arts)

Minister for Education, Training and Employment of Queensland
- In office 3 April 2012 – 14 February 2015
- Premier: Campbell Newman
- Preceded by: Cameron Dick (Education); Stirling Hinchliffe (Employment)
- Succeeded by: Kate Jones (Education); Yvette D'Ath (Training); Curtis Pitt (Employment)

Leader of the Opposition of Queensland Leader of the Liberal National Party
- In office 2 April 2009 – 22 March 2011
- Deputy: Lawrence Springborg
- Preceded by: Lawrence Springborg
- Succeeded by: Jeff Seeney (Opposition); Campbell Newman (LNP)

Manager of Opposition Business in Queensland
- In office 30 September 2008 – 2 April 2009
- Leader: Lawrence Springborg
- Preceded by: Stuart Copeland
- Succeeded by: Jeff Seeney

Member of the Queensland Parliament for Surfers Paradise
- Incumbent
- Assumed office 7 February 2004
- Preceded by: Lex Bell
- Majority: 16.2% (2020)

Personal details
- Born: John-Paul Honoré Langbroek Assen, Netherlands
- Party: Liberal National Party
- Other political affiliations: Liberal Party
- Relations: Kate Langbroek (sister)
- Nickname: JP

John-Paul Honoré Langbroek is an Australian politician currently serving as the Minister for Education and Minister for the Arts in Queensland since 1 November 2024. He has been the member of the Queensland parliament for Surfers Paradise since 2004, representing the Liberal Party and its successor, the Liberal National Party (LNP). Langbroek served as Leader of the Opposition and parliamentary leader of the LNP from 2009 to 2011. He was previously a minister in the Newman government before its defeat at the 2015 state election.

== Early life and education ==
John-Paul Honoré Langbroek was born in Assen in the Netherlands and moved to Brisbane as a one-year-old in 1962. His father is Dutch and his mother is American with Jamaican ancestry. John-Paul and his sister, Melbourne-based media personality Kate Langbroek, grew up as the only two children of Jehovah's Witnesses. The family travelled around rural Queensland, where Langbroek Sr worked at various schools. John-Paul began his schooling at Burleigh Heads State School on the Gold Coast and graduated from Sunnybank State High School.

He studied dentistry at the University of Queensland in the 1980s, receiving an honours degree in dental science. At university he showed no early sign of an interest in politics, describing his student days at the University of Queensland as being "toga parties, Lacoste shirts and university japes".

== Political career ==
Langbroek entered politics in 2001 when he stood as the Liberal candidate in the May 2001 by-election for Surfers Paradise. The by-election was triggered by the resignation of the previous member, former National Party Premier Rob Borbidge who had just led the Coalition to a landslide defeat in the general election earlier in 2001. Due to voter anger at being forced to the polls for the second time in three months, the National vote tumbled to eight percent. This left Langbroek far short of the support he needed to overtake Gold Coast councillor and former mayor Lex Bell, who won the seat as an independent. Langbroek stood again in Surfers Paradise at the 2004 state election and won convincingly with Bell being pushed into third place. He has held the seat comfortably ever since, and as of the 2017 election sits on a majority of 19.8 percent, making Surfers Paradise the safest LNP seat in the chamber.

=== Opposition (2004–2009) ===
As an MP he had served in the opposition shadow ministry for a number of years. He has held various shadow portfolios, including health, public works, mines and energy and immediately before his ascension to the leadership he has served as Shadow Minister for Education and Skills and Shadow Minister for the Arts from 12 August 2008.

=== Leader of the Opposition (2009–2011) ===
Langbroek was elected leader of the LNP following the 2009 state election after the LNP's first leader, Lawrence Springborg, announced his retirement. Langbroek named Springborg as his deputy. Langbroek's election marked the first time in 84 years that the non-Labor side in Queensland had been led by someone aligned federally with the Liberals or their predecessors. The Nationals have historically been the stronger non-Labor party in the state, and had been the dominant partner in the non-Labor Coalition from 1925 until the formation of the LNP in 2008.

Polling for much of 2009 and 2010 showed the LNP ahead of Labor on the two-party vote, and Langbroek consistently led incumbent Labor Premier Anna Bligh as preferred premier. However, after Labor's numbers rebounded in the wake of the Queensland floods, Langbroek came under growing pressure from the LNP's organisational wing to stand down. According to Nine News Queensland's Spencer Jolly, LNP president Bruce McIver was trying to engineer a by-election to get Brisbane Lord Mayor Campbell Newman, also from the Liberal side of the merger, elected to the legislature so Newman could challenge Langbroek for the LNP leadership.

In 2010, Langbroek as LNP leader opposed the labor government push for state Constitutional recognition of Aboriginal Australians. Saying it was wrong to elevate recognition of one ethnic group within the Queensland community to the exclusion of all others. Langbroek also wanted a Referendum on the issue.

On 22 March 2011, Newman announced he would be seeking pre-selection for the seat of Ashgrove, and would challenge for the LNP leadership if successful. Later that day, Langbroek and Springborg announced their resignations as leader and deputy leader, respectively. While a February poll showed the LNP with 55 percent two-party support—enough to make Langbroek premier—internal Coalition polling suggested that under Newman, the LNP would win government "in a canter". As late as the previous day, Langbroek had insisted that he would not resign, and even demanded that McIver and the rest of the organisational wing either back down from their attempts to push him out or resign themselves. He appeared to have the support of most of the party room as well. However, within hours of Newman's announcement, Langbroek gave way.

=== Newman Government (2011–2015) ===
Newman appointed Langbroek Shadow Police Minister in his Shadow Cabinet.

After the LNP landslide in the 2012 election, Langbroek was made Minister for Education, Training and Employment in the Newman Ministry.

=== Opposition (2015-2024) ===
Following Newman government's defeat in the 2015 election, Langbroek became Deputy leader of the LNP and Deputy Leader of the Opposition. He left the position after Lawrence Springborg lost the leadership to Tim Nicholls with Deb Frecklington replacing Langbroek in his position as deputy leader.

He has remained on the opposition frontbench under Nicholls, Frecklington and Crisafulli.

After Nicholls stood down as leader after the 2017 election, Langbroek stood for the LNP leadership again, finishing second to Frecklington with 10 votes to her 25, with 3 for Mark Robinson.

=== Crisafulli Government (2024–present) ===
Following the LNP's victory at the 2024 Queensland state election, Langbroek was appointed Minister for Education and Minister for the Arts in the Crisafulli ministry, beginning his term on 1 November 2024.

In May 2025, he directed the State Library of Queensland to withdraw one of the awardees of their 2025 black&write! writing fellowships, just hours before the ceremony. The library withdrew the fellowship from Martu author K. A. Ren Wyld based on a 2024 tweet about the killing of Hamas leader Yahya Sinwar by Israel. Wyld later said she was unaware of who Sinwar was at the time and believed she had deleted the tweet afterwards. Following the incident, several Queensland Literary Awards panel judges, including Jeanine Leane and writer and critic Nigel Featherstone, resigned in protest.

In August 2025, Langbroek oversaw Queensland's first teachers' strike in 16 years, organised by the Queensland Teachers' Union (QTU). Over 50,000 teachers participated, rejecting the government's offer of an 8% pay rise over three years, arguing it would leave Queensland teachers at the bottom of the national pay scale. The strike also reflected concerns about excessive workloads, understaffing, and inadequate classroom resources.

== Personal life ==
Langbroek is married and has three children. Although he has not shown a clear rejection of his parents' religion (Jehovah's Witnesses), he does not discuss the topic at length.

He has expressed the pain of having a relative with motor neurone disease. Describing the disease as having "destroyed his family", causing his 58-year-old brother-in-law to need constant nursing and causing potentially fatal weight loss.

Political offices
Preceded by Tim Mulherin	Deputy Leader of the Opposition of Queensland; 2015–2016	Succeeded by Deb Frecklington
Preceded by Cameron Dick	Minister for Education of Queensland; 2012–2015	Succeeded by Kate Jones
Preceded by Stirling Hinchliffe as Minister for Employment and Skills	Minister for Training and Employment of Queensland; 2012–2015	Succeeded by Curtis Pitt as Minister for Employment
Preceded by Lawrence Springborg	Leader of the Opposition of Queensland; 2009–2011	Succeeded by Jeff Seeney
Parliament of Queensland
Preceded by Lex Bell	Member for Surfers Paradise; 2004–present	Incumbent
Party political offices
Preceded by Lawrence Springborg	Leader of the Liberal National Party of Queensland; 2009–2011	Succeeded by Campbell Newman
Preceded by Jeff Seeney	Deputy Leader of the Liberal National Party of Queensland; 2015–2016	Succeeded by Deb Frecklington
