= Deb Frecklington =

Australian politician (born 1971)

The Honourable Deb Frecklington MP
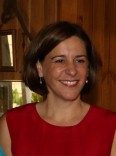

Leader of the Opposition in Queensland Leader of the Liberal National Party Elections: 2020
- In office 12 December 2017 – 12 November 2020
- Premier: Annastacia Palaszczuk
- Deputy: Tim Mander
- Preceded by: Tim Nicholls
- Succeeded by: David Crisafulli

Deputy Leader of the Opposition in Queensland Deputy Leader of the Liberal National Party
- In office 6 May 2016 – 12 December 2017
- Leader: Tim Nicholls
- Preceded by: John-Paul Langbroek
- Succeeded by: Tim Mander

Assistant Minister to the Premier
- In office 28 May 2014 – 14 February 2015
- Leader: Campbell Newman
- Preceded by: Position established
- Succeeded by: Stirling Hinchliffe

Assistant Minister for Finance, Administration and Regulatory Reform
- In office 18 May 2012 – 28 May 2014
- Leader: Campbell Newman
- Preceded by: Position established
- Succeeded by: Lisa France

Member of the Queensland Legislative Assembly for Nanango
- Incumbent
- Assumed office 24 March 2012
- Preceded by: Dorothy Pratt

Attorney General of Queensland Minister for Justice
- Incumbent
- Assumed office 1 November 2024
- Premier: David Crisafulli
- Preceded by: Yvette D’Ath

Personal details
- Born: Deborah Kay Stiller; 3 September 1971 (age 55) Miles, Queensland, Australia
- Party: Liberal National
- Spouse: Jason Frecklington
- Children: 3
- Education: Guluguba State School; Ipswich Girls' Grammar School
- Alma mater: University of Southern Queensland (BBus); Queensland Institute of Technology (LLB)
- Occupation: Solicitor; Politician

Deborah Kay Frecklington (born 3 September 1971) is an Australian politician currently serving as the member for Nanango in the Legislative Assembly of Queensland, having won the seat at the 2012 state election. She was the Leader of the Queensland Opposition and leader of the Liberal National Party of Queensland (LNP) before resigning as party leader following the LNP’s loss at the 2020 Queensland state election. She is currently serving as Attorney-General of Queensland as well as Minister for Justice and Minister for Integrity under David Crisafulli.

== Early life ==
Frecklington was born in Miles in south-west Queensland. She grew up on a cattle property at Guluguba and attended Guluguba State School. For her secondary schooling, she was a boarder at Ipswich Girls' Grammar School.

Frecklington has a Bachelor of Business (University of Southern Queensland) and a Bachelor of Laws (Queensland University of Technology).

She has worked in the clothing, motor vehicle and newspaper industries. Her career takes in the co-management of broad-acre cropping properties with her husband. During her time as a lawyer, she worked for Kelly & Frecklington Solicitors, specialising in family and property law.

== Politics ==
Frecklington was appointed assistant minister for Finance, Administration and Regulatory Reform on 3 April 2012 and subsequently appointed to the role of assistant minister to the premier in June 2014. Following the LNP's defeat in 2015, she was appointed to the LNP front bench as Shadow Minister for Agriculture.

In 2016, she was elected unopposed as deputy leader of the LNP—and hence deputy leader of the opposition—after Tim Nicholls ousted Lawrence Springborg as leader.

=== Leader of the LNP ===
After Nicholls led the party to a loss at the 2017 state election, Frecklington was elected the leader of the LNP at a party-room meeting on 12 December 2017. Frecklington secured 25 votes out of a possible 39 in the first round of voting. Former leader John-Paul Langbroek received 10 votes while outsider Mark Robinson received three votes, and there was one informal vote. Frecklington became only the second female Queensland opposition leader in history, and the first woman to lead the non-Labor side in Queensland. She is also the second LNP leader from a long-held national seat; Nanango was the seat of former long-serving National Premier Joh Bjelke-Petersen, who held it and its successor seat, Barambah, from 1947 to 1987.

Frecklington took the LNP into the 2020 Queensland state election. The LNP was heavily defeated, suffering a five-seat swing and winning only five seats in Brisbane. Frecklington initially indicated she would stay on as leader, but on 2 November announced she would call a leadership spill which she would not contest. On 12 November, David Crisafulli was elected leader.

Soon afterward, Frecklington became shadow minister for water and shadow minister for regional development in Crisafulli's shadow cabinet. She is one of the few state politicians in Australia to have never spent a day on the backbench, having spent her entire career as a junior minister (2012-2015), shadow minister (2015-2016, 2020–present), deputy opposition leader (2016-2017) and opposition leader (2017-2020).

After the LNP's victory in the 2024 Queensland state election, Frecklington was appointed Attorney General, Minister for Justice and Minister for Integrity by newly elected premier, David Crisafulli.

== Personal life ==
Frecklington lives with her husband in Esk.

== See also ==
- Shadow ministry of Deb Frecklington

Political offices
| Preceded by Tim Nicholls | Leader of the Opposition (Queensland); 2017–2020 | Succeeded by David Crisafulli |
Parliament of Queensland
| Preceded by Dorothy Pratt | Member for Nanango; 2012–present | Incumbent |
Party political offices
| Preceded by Tim Nicholls | Leader of the Liberal National Party of Queensland; 2017–2020 | Succeeded by David Crisafulli |
