= 2009 Liberal National Party of Queensland leadership election =

Leader selection contests within Queensland's opposition party

- 2 April 2009
- Leadership election
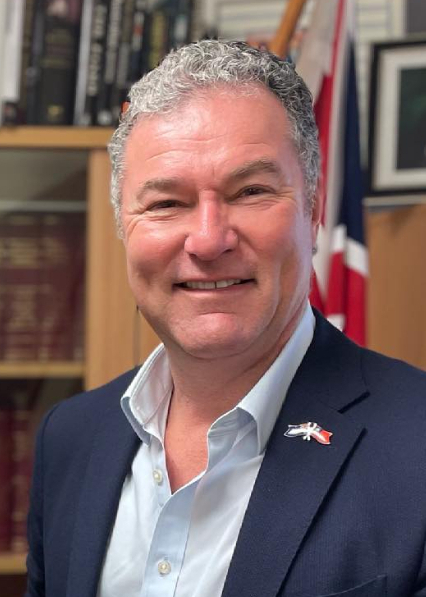

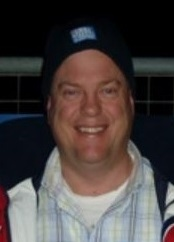

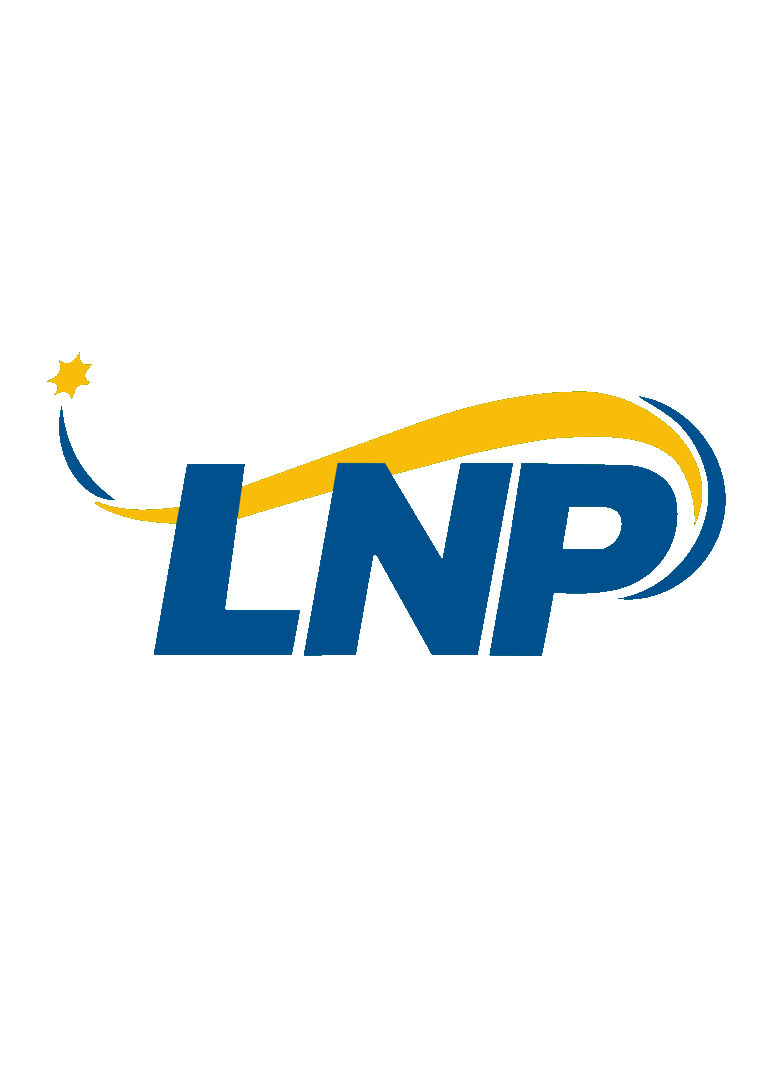
Candidate	John-Paul Langbroek	Tim Nicholls	Fiona Simpson
First round	<17	<17	<17
Second round	17 (Note: The Courier Mail reported that some LNP sources said the final round of voting resulted in a one vote margin, while other sources claimed it was three or four votes.)	16	Eliminated
Seat	Surfers Paradise	Clayfield	Maroochydore
Leader before election
Lawrence Springborg
Elected Leader
John-Paul Langbroek
- Deputy leadership election
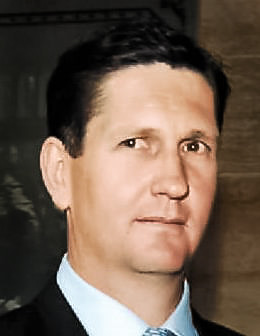

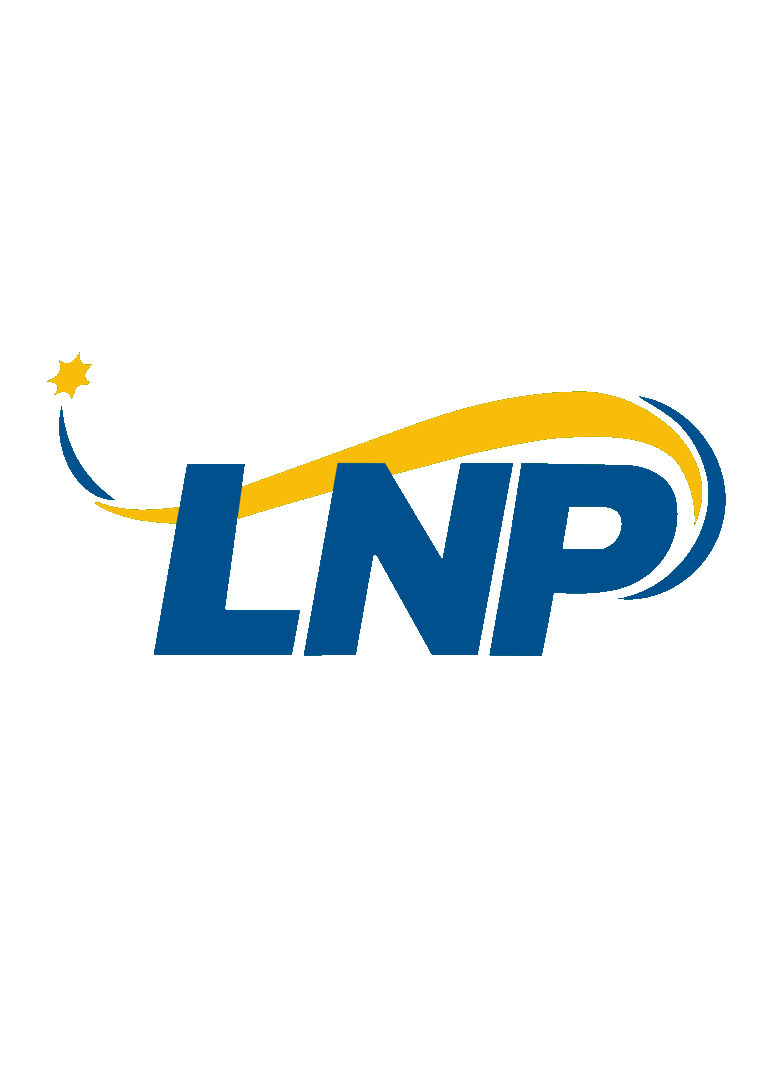

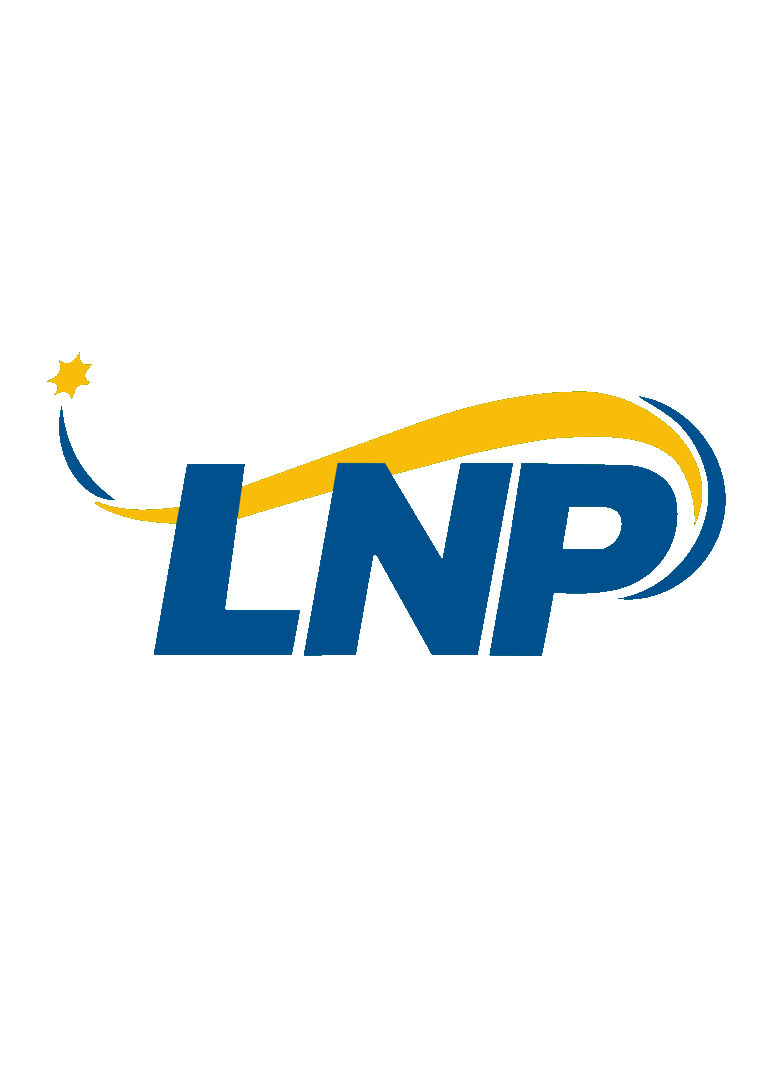
Candidate	Lawrence Springborg	Rob Messenger	Jeff Seeney
Caucus vote	>17	<17	<17
Seat	Southern Downs	Burnett	Callide
Deputy before election
Mark McArdle
Elected Deputy
Lawrence Springborg

The 2009 Liberal National Party of Queensland leadership election was held on 2 April 2009 to elect a new leader of the Liberal National Party of Queensland (LNP) and, ex officio, Leader of the Opposition.

Following the LNP's loss at the state election on 21 March 2009, Lawrence Springborg resigned as leader. Springborg had served as leader of the LNP since the party was formed in 2008 following the merger of the Queensland Liberal Party and the Queensland National Party; the latter he had previously led.

Three MPs − John-Paul Langbroek, Tim Nicholls and Fiona Simpson − contested the leadership, with Langbroek emerging victorious by a narrow margin on the second ballot. Springborg was elected deputy leader, defeating Jeff Seeney and Rob Messenger, after Mark McArdle did not recontest the position.

Langbroek would ultimately not lead the LNP to the next state election in 2012, as Brisbane lord mayor Campbell Newman entered state politics and became LNP leader in 2011. Springborg later returned as leader in 2015, but lost a spill to Nicholls in 2016.

== Candidates ==
=== Leader ===
==== Declared ====
Candidate	Electorate	Announced
John-Paul Langbroek	Surfers Paradise	23 March 2009
Tim Nicholls	Clayfield	31 March 2009
Fiona Simpson	Maroochydore	27 March 2009

==== Speculated ====
Candidate	Electorate
Mark McArdle	Caloundra

=== Deputy leader ===
==== Declared ====
Candidate	Electorate	Announced
Rob Messenger	Burnett	24 March 2009
Jeff Seeney	Southern Downs	24 March 2009
Lawrence Springborg	Southern Downs	2 April 2009
