= 2017 Queensland state election =

- 25 November 2017

All 93 seats in the Legislative Assembly of Queensland 47 seats are needed for a majority
- Opinion polls
- Turnout: 87.52 (▼2.37 pp)
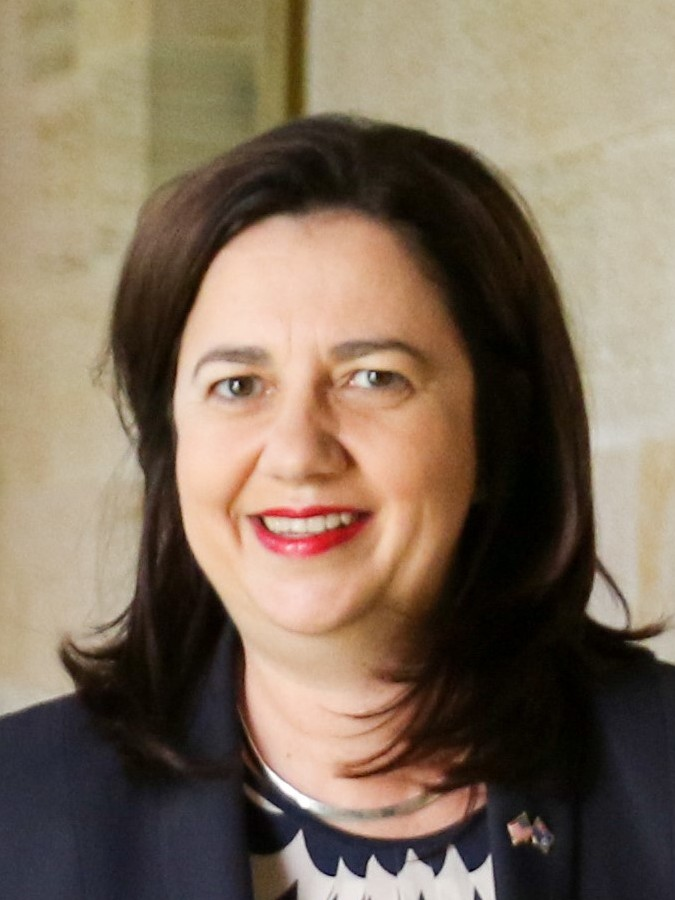

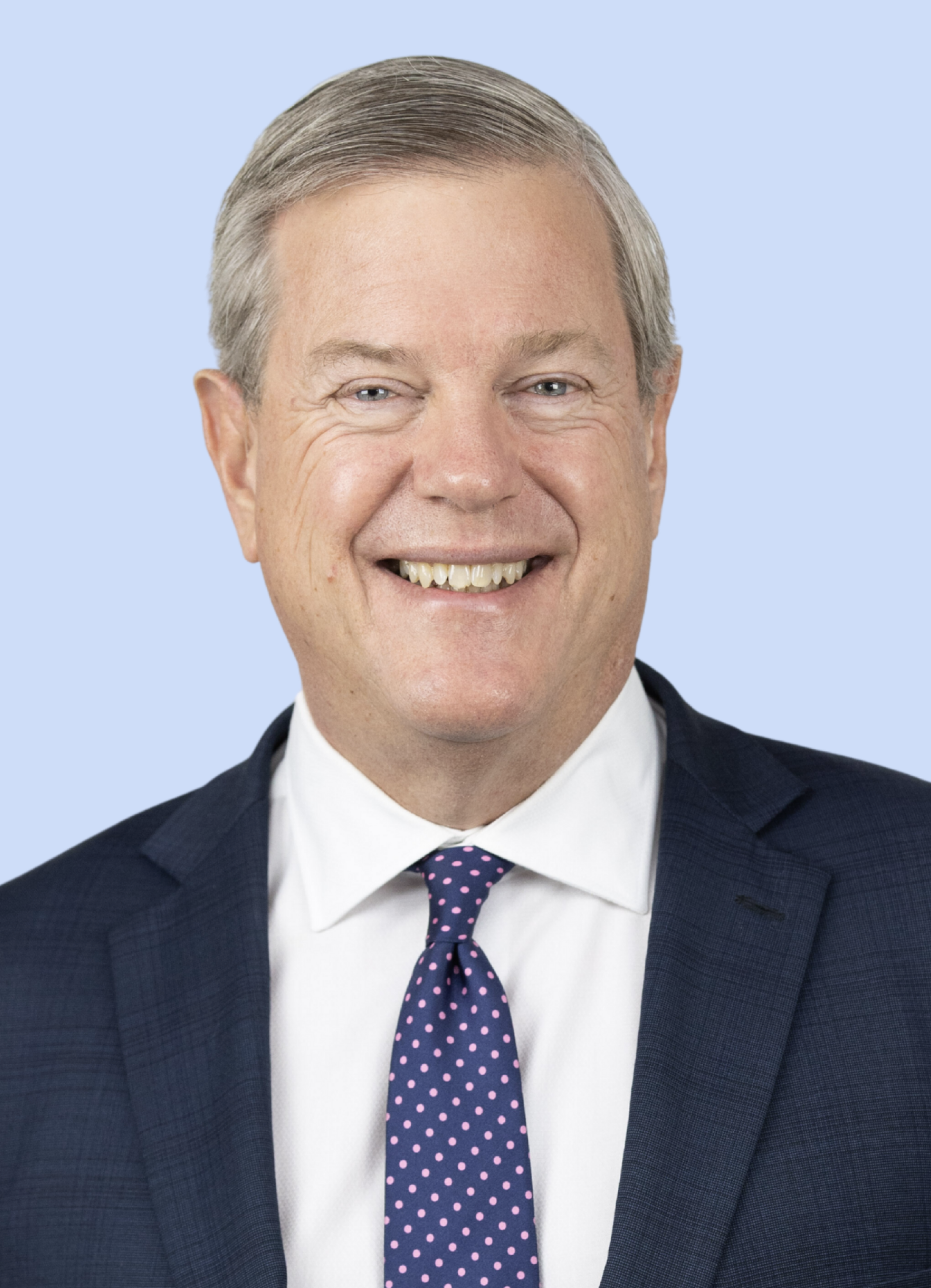

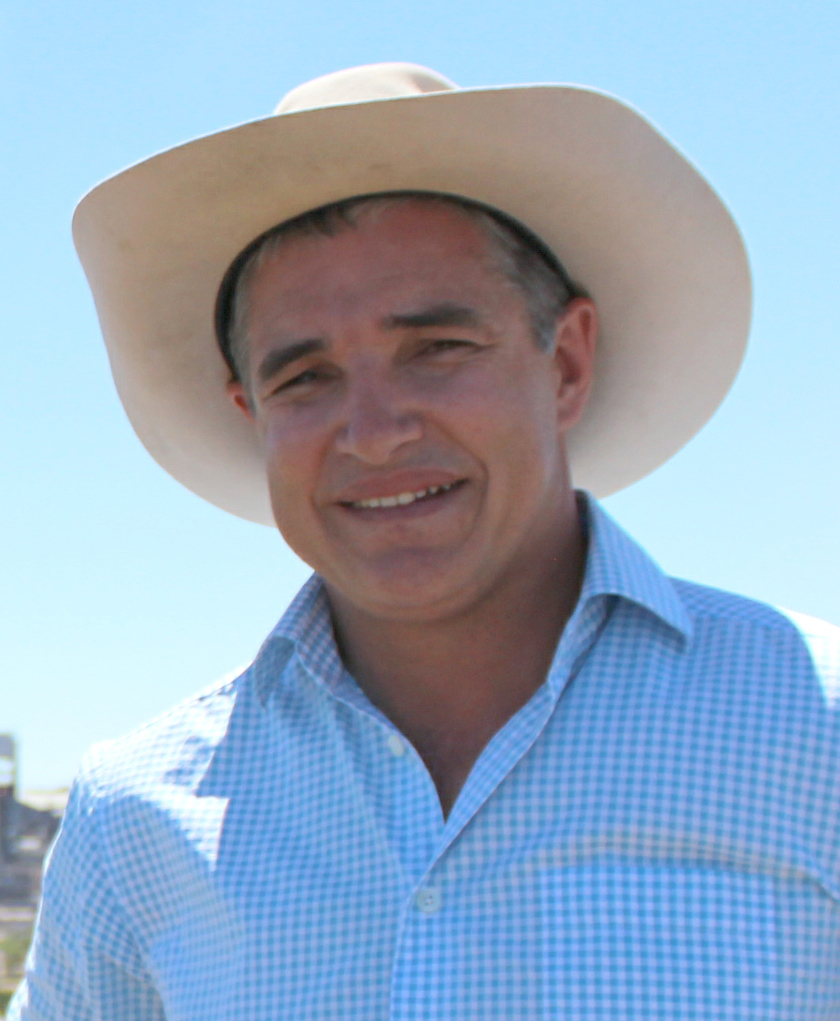

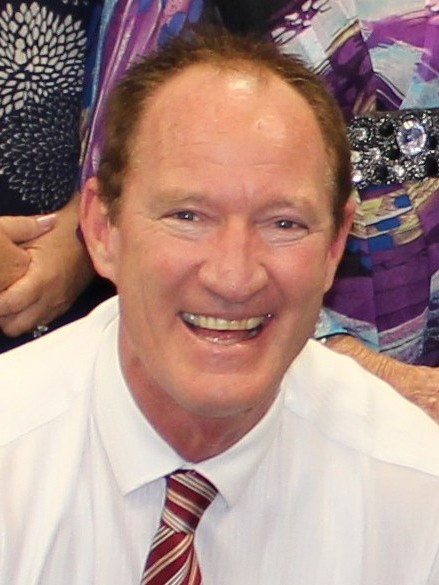

	First party	Second party	Third party
Leader	Annastacia Palaszczuk	Tim Nicholls	Robbie Katter
Party	Labor	Liberal National	Katter's Australian
Leader since	28 March 2012	6 May 2016	2 February 2015
Leader's seat	Inala	Clayfield	Traeger
Last election	44 seats, 37.47%	42 seats, 41.32%	2 seats, 1.93%
Seats before	41	41	2
Seats won	48	39	3
Seat change	▲7	▼2	▲1
Popular vote	957,890	911,019	62,613
Percentage	35.43%	33.69%	2.32%
Swing	▼2.05	▼7.63	▲0.39
TPP	51.3%	48.7%
TPP swing	▲0.2	▼0.2
	Fourth party	Fifth party
Leader	Steve Dickson	No leader
Party	One Nation	Greens
Leader since	23 January 2017
Leader's seat	Buderim (lost seat)
Last election	0 seats, 0.92%	0 seats, 8.43%
Seats before	1	0
Seats won	1	1
Seat change	Steady	▲1
Popular vote	371,193	270,263
Percentage	13.73%	10.00%
Swing	▲12.81	▲1.57
- Winning margin by electorate.
Premier before election
Annastacia Palaszczuk
Labor
Elected Premier
Annastacia Palaszczuk
Labor

The 2017 Queensland state election was held on 25 November 2017 to elect all 93 members of the Legislative Assembly of Queensland, the unicameral Parliament of Queensland.

The first-term incumbent Labor government, led by Premier Annastacia Palaszczuk, won a second term in government. They were challenged by the Liberal National opposition, led by Opposition Leader Tim Nicholls and minor parties One Nation, Katter's Australian Party and the Greens. The 2015 election outcome had delivered a hung parliament with 44 seats to the Labor opposition, 42 seats to the one-term Liberal National government, and three to the crossbench including two to Katter's Australian Party. Just one seat short of majority government, Labor was able to form minority government with confidence and supply support from sole independent MP Peter Wellington, who otherwise retained the right to vote on conscience. During the parliamentary term, Labor MPs Billy Gordon and Rob Pyne became independent MPs, however they both indicated they would provide confidence and supply support for the government.

The day after the election, ABC election analyst Antony Green predicted that Labor would win up to 48 seats and was likely to form government in its own right. By 6 December, several news agencies reported that Labor had won a majority of seats in the Parliament.

With the redistribution increasing the size of parliament from 89 seats to 93 seats, Labor increased its representation by a net seven seats to a total of 48 seats, an increase of four since the last election and a notional increase of one since the redistribution, allowing it to form government in its own right by two seats. The Liberal National opposition decreased their representation by a net three seats to a total of 39 seats, a decrease of two seats since the last election and a notional decrease of five since the redistribution. On the crossbench, Katter's Australian Party won three seats, an increase of one since the last election and a notional increase of two since the redistribution, one new independent candidate won a seat while all the incumbent independents lost their seats. One Nation won its first seat since 2009 and the Greens won a seat at a state election for the first time.

Despite a small two-party swing to Labor statewide and Labor increasing its seat total, a number of regional seats notably swung to the Coalition. The LNP regained the seat of Bundaberg from Labor as well as Burdekin which was held by the LNP prior to the election but made notionally Labor due to redistribution.

On 8 December 2017, Opposition Leader Tim Nicholls conceded defeat and announced he would step down as leader of the party. Later that day, Palaszczuk visited Government House and was invited to form a majority government by the Governor. The Second Palaszczuk Ministry was subsequently sworn in by the Governor on 12 December 2017. This marked the tenth time in the last eleven elections that Queensland Labor had won government; it won eight consecutive election victories from 1989 to 2009, and was only out of government from 1996 to 1998 when Labor lost its parliamentary majority as well as from 2012 to 2015 following the Liberal National Party's 2012 landslide win.

== Background ==
=== Previous election ===
At the 2015 election, Labor won 44 seats, the most of all parties, but short by one of commanding a majority in the Legislative Assembly. The Liberal National Party, despite winning a record majority of 78 at the previous election, won 42 seats. Katter's Australian Party won two seats, and the independent member for Nicklin, Wellington, retained his seat.

Wellington gave confidence and supply support to Labor to form government, giving it the majority of 45 out of 89 seats in parliament, and consequently the previous Liberal National government under the leadership of Campbell Newman, who lost his seat of Ashgrove, lost office after one term.

=== Calling of election ===
After Labor's retraction of endorsement for MP Rick Williams on 27 October 2017, the party's seat count dropped to 41, equalling that of the LNP. Several media sources reported that Premier Palaszczuk would call a snap election. On 29 October Palaszczuk asked the Acting Governor Catherine Holmes to dissolve parliament and a writ was issued for a 25 November state election.

== Key dates ==
Date	Event
29 October 2017	Writ of election issued by the Acting Governor
3 November 2017	Close of electoral rolls
7 November 2017	Close of nominations
25 November 2017	Polling day, between the hours of 8 am and 6 pm
5 December 2017	Cut off for the return of postal ballot papers
8 December 2017	Election results declared and writ returned
12 December 2017	Second Palaszczuk Ministry sworn in
13 February 2018	56th Parliament convened

== Electoral system ==
Queensland elected its members using instant-runoff voting.

Amendments to electoral laws increased the number of seats by four from 89 to 93, necessitating the redrawing of district boundaries, and changed the optional preferential voting system to compulsory full-preferential voting.

A 2016 referendum also replaced the state's unfixed maximum three-year terms with fixed four-year terms, but these would not apply until the 2020 election.

== Electoral redistribution ==
A redistribution of electoral boundaries occurred earlier in 2017.

The electorates of Albert, Ashgrove, Beaudesert, Brisbane Central, Cleveland, Dalrymple, Indooroopilly, Kallangur, Mount Coot-tha, Mount Isa, Sunnybank, and Yeerongpilly were abolished.

The electorates of Bancroft, Bonney, Cooper, Hill, Jordan, Kurwongbah, Macalister, Maiwar, McConnel, Miller, Ninderry, Oodgeroo, Scenic Rim, Theodore, Toohey, and Traeger were created.

The Legislative Assembly was expanded from 89 to 93 members. Indooroopilly was abolished west of Brisbane, while notionally Labor-held Bancroft was created in the corridor north of Brisbane, notionally Liberal National-held Bonney created on the Gold Coast, notionally Labor-held Jordan created in the corridor west of Brisbane, notionally Labor-held Macalister created in the corridor south of Brisbane, and notionally Liberal National-held Ninderry created on the Sunshine Coast. Albert was renamed Theodore, Ashgrove was renamed Cooper, Beaudesert was renamed Scenic Rim, Brisbane Central was renamed McConnel, Cleveland was renamed Oodgeroo, Dalrymple was renamed Hill, Kallangur was renamed Kurwongbah, Mount Coot-tha was renamed Maiwar, Mount Isa was renamed Traeger, Sunnybank was renamed Toohey, and Yeerongpilly was renamed Miller. Burdekin, Mansfield, and Mount Ommaney became notionally Labor-held, while Pumicestone became notionally Liberal National-held.

The changes resulted in 48 notionally Labor-held seats, 2 notionally Katter's Australian-held seats, 42 notionally Liberal National-held seats, and 1 notionally Independent-held seat.

== Retiring members ==
=== Labor ===
- Bill Byrne (Rockhampton) – Announced 7 October 2017

=== Liberal National ===
- Verity Barton (Broadwater) – Lost preselection 28 May 2017;
- Ian Rickuss (Lockyer) – Announced 12 November 2016
- Jeff Seeney (Callide) – Announced 2 March 2017
- Lawrence Springborg (Southern Downs) – Announced 3 December 2016

=== Independent ===
- Billy Gordon (Cook) – Elected as Labor. Announced 31 October 2017
- Peter Wellington (Nicklin) – Announced 16 February 2017

== Results ==
Winning party by electorate.

Results of the 2017 Queensland state election, Legislative Assembly
Party	Votes	%	+/–	Seats	+/–
Labor	957,890	35.43	–2.05	48	+4
Liberal National	911,019	33.69	–7.63	39	+3
One Nation	371,193	13.73	+12.81	1	+1
Greens	270,263	10.00	+1.57	1	+1
Katter's Australian	62,613	2.32	+0.39	3	+1
Consumer Rights	7,167	0.27	+0.27	0	±0
Independents	123,796	4.58	+0.95	1	±0
Total	2,703,941	100.00	–	93	–
Valid votes	2,703,941	95.66			
Invalid/blank votes	122,672	4.34	+2.23		
Total votes	2,826,613	100.00	–		
Registered voters/turnout	3,229,536	87.52	–2.37		

Independent: Sandy Bolton (Noosa)

Popular vote
Labor	35.43%
LNP	33.69%
One Nation	13.73%
Greens	10.00%
Katter's	2.32%
Independents	4.58%
Other	0.12%

Two-party preferred vote
Labor	51.2%
LNP	48.8%

Seats summary
Labor	51.61%
LNP	41.94%
Katter's	3.23%
One Nation	1.08%
Greens	1.08%
Independents	1.08%

== Seats changing hands ==
Seat	2017 Redistribution			Swing	2017 Election		
Seat	Party	Member	Margin	Swing	Margin	Member	Party
Aspley	Liberal National	Tracy Davis	3.20	–4.37	1.17	Bart Mellish	Labor
Bundaberg	Labor	Leanne Donaldson	0.50	–4.70	4.20	David Batt	Liberal National
Burdekin	Labor	notional	1.40	–2.20	0.80	Dale Last	Liberal National
Gaven	Liberal National	Sid Cramp	2.80	–3.51	0.71	Meaghan Scanlon	Labor
Hinchinbrook	Liberal National	Andrew Cripps	3.40	–10.95	7.55	Nick Dametto	Katter's Australian
Maiwar	Liberal National	Scott Emerson	3.00	–4.63	1.63	Michael Berkman	Greens
Mirani	Labor	Jim Pearce	3.80	–8.62	4.82	Stephen Andrew	One Nation
Nicklin	Independent	Peter Wellington	4.10	–19.38	5.28	Marty Hunt	Liberal National
Noosa	Liberal National	Glen Elmes	6.60	–18.13	11.53	Sandy Bolton	Independent
Redlands	Liberal National	Matt McEachan	1.20	–4.26	3.06	Kim Richards	Labor

- Members listed in italics did not contest their seat at this election.
- The Labor Party also retained the seat of Cairns, where the sitting Labor member had resigned and contested the election as an independent, and the seat of Cook, where the sitting Labor member was expelled and sat as an independent.
- The Liberal National Party also retained the seat of Buderim, where the sitting Liberal National member had resigned and contested the election as a member of the One Nation Party, and the seat of Pumicestone, which had a notional Liberal National margin.

== Post-election pendulum ==
Government seats
Marginal
Townsville	Scott Stewart	ALP	0.38%
Gaven	Meaghan Scanlon	ALP	0.71%
Mundingburra	Coralee O'Rourke	ALP	1.13%
Aspley	Bart Mellish	ALP	1.17%
Mansfield	Corrine McMillan	ALP	1.62%
Barron River	Craig Crawford	ALP	1.86%
Maryborough	Bruce Saunders	ALP	2.46% v ONP
Redlands	Kim Richards	ALP	3.06%
Keppel	Brittany Lauga	ALP	3.14% v ONP
Cairns	Michael Healy	ALP	3.39%
South Brisbane	Jackie Trad	ALP	3.55% v GRN
Springwood	Mick de Brenni	ALP	3.59%
Thuringowa	Aaron Harper	ALP	4.15% v ONP
Ferny Grove	Mark Furner	ALP	4.63%
Redcliffe	Yvette D'Ath	ALP	4.86%
Rockhampton	Barry O'Rourke	ALP	5.19% v ONP
Mount Ommaney	Jess Pugh	ALP	5.76%
Cook	Cynthia Lui	ALP	5.84% v ONP
Fairly Safe
Pine Rivers	Nikki Boyd	ALP	6.19%
Bancroft	Chris Whiting	ALP	6.21%
Logan	Linus Power	ALP	6.83% v ONP
Kurwongbah	Shane King	ALP	6.99%
Macalister	Melissa McMahon	ALP	7.45%
McConnel	Grace Grace	ALP	7.86%
Capalaba	Don Brown	ALP	7.86%
Miller	Mark Bailey	ALP	8.18%
Mackay	Julieanne Gilbert	ALP	8.34%
Ipswich West	Jim Madden	ALP	8.72 v ONP
Morayfield	Mark Ryan	ALP	8.72% v ONP
Murrumba	Steven Miles	ALP	9.52%
Jordan	Charis Mullen	ALP	9.91% v ONP
Stretton	Duncan Pegg	ALP	9.89%
Safe
Toohey	Peter Russo	ALP	10.01%
Greenslopes	Joe Kelly	ALP	10.13%
Cooper	Kate Jones	ALP	10.65%
Waterford	Shannon Fentiman	ALP	10.75% v ONP
Bulimba	Di Farmer	ALP	10.78%
Ipswich	Jennifer Howard	ALP	10.89% v ONP
Mulgrave	Curtis Pitt	ALP	10.92%
Lytton	Joan Pease	ALP	12.02%
Stafford	Anthony Lynham	ALP	12.10%
Sandgate	Stirling Hinchliffe	ALP	13.48%
Nudgee	Leanne Linard	ALP	14.32%
Algester	Leeanne Enoch	ALP	14.43%
Very Safe
Gladstone	Glenn Butcher	ALP	20.70% v ONP
Bundamba	Jo-Ann Miller	ALP	21.55%
Inala	Annastacia Palaszczuk	ALP	26.09%
Woodridge	Cameron Dick	ALP	26.37%

Non-Government seats
Marginal
Whitsunday	Jason Costigan	LNP	0.68%
Burdekin	Dale Last	LNP	0.80%
Pumicestone	Simone Wilson	LNP	0.84%
Bonney	Sam O'Connor	LNP	2.18%
Clayfield	Tim Nicholls	LNP	2.41%
Chatsworth	Steve Minnikin	LNP	2.90%
Currumbin	Jann Stuckey	LNP	3.31%
Caloundra	Mark McArdle	LNP	3.41%
Glass House	Andrew Powell	LNP	3.43%
Coomera	Michael Crandon	LNP	3.47%
Theodore	Mark Boothman	LNP	3.72%
Lockyer	Jim McDonald	LNP	4.07% v ONP
Bundaberg	David Batt	LNP	4.20%
Burleigh	Michael Hart	LNP	4.85%
Everton	Tim Mander	LNP	4.94%
Moggill	Christian Rowan	LNP	5.03%
Nicklin	Marty Hunt	LNP	5.28%
Toowoomba North	Trevor Watts	LNP	5.72%
Fairly Safe
Callide	Colin Boyce	LNP	6.11% v ONP
Mermaid Beach	Ray Stevens	LNP	6.26%
Southport	Rob Molhoek	LNP	7.24%
Oodgeroo	Mark Robinson	LNP	7.24%
Ninderry	Dan Purdie	LNP	8.38%
Maroochydore	Fiona Simpson	LNP	8.52%
Gympie	Tony Perrett	LNP	8.68% v ONP
Hervey Bay	Ted Sorensen	LNP	9.10%
Warrego	Ann Leahy	LNP	9.46% v KAP
Mudgeeraba	Ros Bates	LNP	9.85%
Toowoomba South	David Janetzki	LNP	9.98%
Safe
Burnett	Stephen Bennett	LNP	10.65%
Condamine	Pat Weir	LNP	10.71% v ONP
Buderim	Brent Mickelberg	LNP	11.41%
Southern Downs	James Lister	LNP	13.03% v ONP
Kawana	Jarrod Bleijie	LNP	13.07%
Scenic Rim	Jon Krause	LNP	13.12% v ONP
Nanango	Deb Frecklington	LNP	13.36% v ONP
Gregory	Lachlan Millar	LNP	13.94% v ONP
Broadwater	David Crisafulli	LNP	17.98
Surfers Paradise	John-Paul Langbroek	LNP	19.78
Crossbench seats
Maiwar	Michael Berkman	GRN	1.63% v LNP
Mirani	Stephen Andrew	ONP	4.82% v ALP
Hinchinbrook	Nick Dametto	KAP	7.55% v LNP
Noosa	Sandy Bolton	IND	11.53% v LNP
Hill	Shane Knuth	KAP	19.75% v ALP
Traeger	Robbie Katter	KAP	28.49% v ALP

== Subsequent changes ==
- On 2 February 2019, Jason Costigan (Whitsunday) resigned and sat as an independent, before forming his own party the North Queensland First.
- On 1 February, Jann Stuckey (Currumbin) resigned. At the by-election on 28 March 2020, Laura Gerber retained the seat for the Liberal National Party.
- On 20 February, Jo-Ann Miller (Bundamba) resigned. At the by-election on 28 March 2020, Lance McCallum retained the seat for the Labor Party.

== Milestones ==
This election resulted in a number of historical milestones being achieved for the representation in the Queensland Parliament. These include:

- the first Australian woman state premier to win government from Opposition and then be re-elected, Annastacia Palaszczuk;
- the election of the first Torres Strait Islander, Cynthia Lui;
- the election of the first South Sea Islander, Stephen Andrew; and
- the election of the first Queensland Greens MP, Michael Berkman (the first ever Queensland MP Ronan Lee was elected under the Australian Labor Party, and lost his re-election bid after defecting to the Greens).

== Political donations ==
Prior to the election, the Shooting Industry Foundation of Australia used $550,000 to launch an advertising campaign, named Flick'em, in an effort to urge voters to put both major parties last in ballot paper preferences. This campaign boosted votes for Pauline Hanson's One Nation and the Katter's Australian Party and achieved lowest major party votes in QLD history.

The Firearm Owners United which is a new gun rights group which also in 2017 made its first financial contribution to a campaign during the Queensland state election, donating $1,000 to Pauline Hanson's One Nation party and Katter's Australian Party.

== Date ==
Following the successful 2016 referendum to introduce four-year fixed-term elections, this was the last Queensland election where the date of the election could be chosen at the serving Premier's discretion.

Section 84 of the Electoral Act 1992 stated that an election must be held on a Saturday, and that the election campaign must run for a minimum of 26 or a maximum of 56 days following the issue of the writs including the day the writ drops and polling day. Five to seven days following the issue of the writs, the electoral roll is to be closed, which gives voters a final opportunity to enrol or to notify the Electoral Commission of Queensland of any changes in their place of residence.

The Constitution (Fixed Term Parliament) Amendment Act 2015, which amended the Constitution of Queensland to provide for state elections on the fourth Saturday in October every four years, did not come into effect until the 2020 election. Therefore, this was the last election to which section 2 of the Constitution Act Amendment Act 1890 applied before its repeal. It provided that the Legislative Assembly continues for no more than three years from the day set for the return of writs for the previous election, after which time the Legislative Assembly expires.

The day set for the return of writs for the 2015 election was 16 February 2015, but the deadline appointed in the writ for its return was Wednesday 11 March 2015. The Electoral Act requires the Governor to issue writs for a general election no more than four days after the Legislative Assembly is dissolved or expires. The last possible day for the next election was therefore a Saturday not more than 56 days beyond four days after the expiry of the Legislative Assembly on 11 March 2018, namely 5 May 2018.

Palaszczuk faced constant media questions during 2017 about whether she would call an early election. She stated that it was her intention to hold it in 2018, and that it would take something "extraordinary" for it to be held in 2017. Following Agriculture Minister Bill Byrne's resignation on health grounds and the disendorsement of Pumicestone MP Rick Williams, on Sunday 29 October 2017, she announced the election would be held on 25 November 2017. Pauline Hanson described this as a "cowardly" move, given that she was overseas on a federal parliamentary trip and would be delayed in starting her One Nation party's campaign.

As the election was held in 2017, this meant that the fixed date for the next state election was on 31 October 2020. Had the election instead been held in 2018, the next fixed election date would have been 30 October 2021.

== Contesting parties ==
The ALP's Queensland branch and the LNP are two of six parties registered with the Electoral Commission of Queensland by October 2017, alongside the Queensland Greens, the Queensland division of Pauline Hanson's One Nation, Katter's Australian Party, and Civil Liberties, Consumer Rights, No-Tolls. Queensland's two-party dominance was threatened by the resurgence of One Nation, given former LNP MP Steve Dickson's defection to become One Nation's state leader in January 2017 and the high-profile candidacy of recently disqualified Senator Malcolm Roberts, and the record strength of the Greens in several urban seats bolstered by Brisbane's first Green councillor Jonathan Sriranganathan (then known as Sri) being elected in 2016.

In January 2017, One Nation disendorsed its Bundamba candidate Shan Ju Lin after her anti-gay social media post. Lin accused James Ashby of deciding on Hanson's behalf that Lin should be disendorsed. In December 2016, Andy Semple withdrew as a candidate for Currumbin, after the party told him to delete an LGBT joke on Twitter.

One Nation dumped a further 6 candidates.

=== Preferences ===
The ALP and The Greens pledged to place One Nation candidates last on their respective party How-To-Vote cards. Both parties also placed each other ahead of the LNP on their cards. Katter's Australia Party exchanged preferences with One Nation in the seats they both contested. The LNP placed Greens candidates below ALP candidates, and placed One Nation candidates ahead of the ALP in 52 of the 61 seats One Nation was contesting, the exceptions being in Buderim, Logan, Mudgeeraba, Nicklin, Coomera, Scenic Rim, Stretton, Toohey and Thuringowa. One Nation, with a few notable exceptions, placed all ALP and LNP sitting MPs last. One Nation also made an agreement with Katter's Australia Party, not to challenge the two sitting KAP MPs in their respective seats.

== Retiring MPs ==
The following Members of the Queensland Legislative Assembly have announced their intention to not contest the 2017 state election:

=== Labor ===
- Bill Byrne (Rockhampton) – announced 7 October 2017

=== Liberal National Party ===
- Verity Barton (Broadwater) – lost preselection 28 May 2017; did not re-nominate
- Ian Rickuss (Lockyer) – announced 12 November 2016
- Jeff Seeney (Callide) – announced 2 March 2017
- Lawrence Springborg (Southern Downs) – announced 3 December 2016

=== Independent ===
- Billy Gordon (Cook) – elected as Labor; announced 31 October 2017
- Peter Wellington (Nicklin) – announced 16 February 2017

== Opinion polling ==
Several research, media and polling firms conduct opinion polls during the parliamentary term and prior to the state election in relation to voting. Most firms use the flow of preferences at the previous election to determine the two-party-preferred vote; others ask respondents to nominate preferences.

=== Primary vote opinion polling graph ===
View source data.

=== Two-party preferred opinion polling graph ===
View source data.

=== Polling ===
==== Voting intention ====
Legislative Assembly polling
Date	Firm	Primary vote					TPP vote
		LNP	ALP	Green	ON	Other	ALP	LNP
25 November 2017	Galaxy (Exit Poll)	35%	37%	9%	13%	6%	52%	48%
21–24 November 2017	Newspoll	34%	36%	10%	13%	7%	52.5%	47.5%
24 November 2017	Galaxy	35%	37%	9%	12%	7%	52%	48%
20 November 2017	ReachTEL	30%	34%	10%	17%	9%	51%	49%
13 November 2017	ReachTEL	30.8%	30.4%	8.1%	16.4%	–	48%	52%
1–2 November 2017	Galaxy	32%	35%	9%	18%	6%	52%	48%
17 October 2017	Newspoll	34%	37%	8%	16%	5%	52%	48%
28 September 2017	ReachTEL	30.6%	32.1%	7.5%	18.1%	7.7%	48%	52%
July–Sep 2017	Newspoll	34%	37%	8%	15%	6%	53%	47%
2–3 August 2017	Galaxy	36%	35%	7%	15%	7%	51%	49%
June 2017	ReachTEL	35.3%	31.9%	9.4%	17%	6.4%	49%	51%
26–27 April 2017	Galaxy	34%	36%	7%	17%	6%	52%	48%
February 2017	ReachTEL	33.2%	30.9%	7%	21.3%	7.6%	47%	53%
February 2017	Galaxy	33%	31%	8%	23%	5%	51%	49%
November 2016	Galaxy	37%	35%	8%	16%	4%	51%	49%
October 2016	Roy Morgan	33.5%	35.5%	12%	10.5%	8.5%	52%	48%
August 2016	Roy Morgan	38.5%	36.5%	9.5%	8.5%	7%	50%	50%
May–June 2016	Newspoll	40%	38%	–	–	–	51%	49%
May 2016	Morgan	40.5%	35.5%	10.5%	–	13.5%	50%	50%
10–11 May 2016	Galaxy	44%	36%	9%	–	11%	48%	52%
26 April 2016	ReachTEL	42.8%	36.9%	10.8%	–	9.5%	48%	52%
March 2016	Roy Morgan	40%	37.5%	12.5%	–	9.5%	52%	48%
10–11 February 2016	Galaxy	43%	37%	9%	–	11%	48%	52%
Jan–Feb 2016	Roy Morgan	45.5%	36.5%	9%	–	9%	48%	52%
December 2015	Newspoll	39%	41%	8%	–	12%	52%	48%
17–18 November 2015	Galaxy	37%	42%	9%	–	12%	49%	51%
16 October 2015	Morgan	42%	34.5%	11.5%	–	12%	49%	51%
Sep 2015	Newspoll	38%	41%	9%	–	12%	53%	47%
28–31 Aug 2015	Morgan	41.5%	38.5%	12%	–	8%	52%	48%
19–20 Aug 2015	Galaxy	39%	40%	10%	–	11%	52%	48%
19–21 Jun 2015	Morgan	42%	39.5%	9.5%	–	9%	51.5%	48.5%
22–24 May 2015	Morgan	44%	34%	11%	–	11%	48%	52%
22 May 2015	ReachTEL	45.6%	37.6%	9.4%	–	7.4%	48%	52%
19–20 May 2015	Galaxy	39%	40%	9%	–	12%	52%	47%
10–12 Apr 2015	Morgan	40.5%	40%	9.5%	–	10%	52.5%	47.5%
8–9 Apr 2015	Galaxy	42%	39%	7%	–	12%	50%	50%
31 January 2015 election		41.3%	37.5%	8.4%	0.9%	12.8%	51.1%	48.9%
26–29 Jan 2015	Newspoll	41%	37%	6%	–	14%	48%	52%
9–26 Jan 2015	Essential	39%	38%	7%	–	16%	50%	50%
16–18 Jan 2015	Morgan	39.5%	37%	10%	–	13.5%	49.5%	50.5%

==== Leadership polling ====
Better Premier/approval polling
Date	Firm	Better Premier			Palaszczuk			Nicholls
		Palaszczuk	Nicholls	Undecided	Satisfied	Dissatisfied	Undecided	Satisfied	Dissatisfied	Undecided
4 Nov 2017	Galaxy	43%	29%	28%	41%	42%	17%	28%	40%	32%
2-3 Aug 2017	Galaxy	Not asked			39%	44%	17%	Not asked
15 May 2016	Galaxy	44%	29%	27%	Not asked

==== Electoral district polling ====
Date	Firm	Electorate	Voting intention						2cp vote			Poll result
Date	Firm	Electorate	LNP	ALP	GRN	KAP	ONP	OTH	ALP	LNP	ONP	Poll result
18 Nov 2017	Newspoll	Bundaberg	37%	33%	9%	—N/a	21%	5%	47%	53%	—N/a	LNP gain
18 Nov 2017	Newspoll	Gaven	50%	43%	7%	—N/a	—N/a	—N/a	49%	51%	—N/a	LNP hold
18 Nov 2017	Newspoll	Ipswich West	17%	45%	9%	—N/a	29%	—N/a	57%	—N/a	43%	Labor hold
18 Nov 2017	Newspoll	Mansfield	37%	40%	7%	—N/a	16%	—N/a	52%	48%	—N/a	Labor hold
18 Nov 2017	Newspoll	Thuringowa	21%	29%	6%	12%	28%	4%	46%	—N/a	54%	One Nation gain
18 Nov 2017	Newspoll	Whitsunday	31%	32%	7%	7%	19%	4%	51%	49%	—N/a	Labor gain
11 Nov 2017	Galaxy	Bonney	45%	39%	9%	—N/a	—N/a	—N/a	50%	50%	—N/a	Tied
11 Nov 2017	Galaxy	Cairns	32%	37%	7%	—N/a	13%	11%	54%	46%	—N/a	Labor hold
11 Nov 2017	Galaxy	Glass House	33%	27%	16%	—N/a	22%	—N/a	50%	50%	—N/a	Tied
11 Nov 2017	Galaxy	Hervey Bay	38%	31%	4%	—N/a	22%	—N/a	45%	55%	—N/a	LNP hold
11 Nov 2017	Galaxy	Logan	20%	35%	7%	—N/a	33%	—N/a	52%	—N/a	48%	Labor hold
11 Nov 2017	Galaxy	Mundingburra	30%	29%	6%	12%	20%	—N/a	48%	52%	—N/a	LNP gain
11 Nov 2017	Galaxy	Rockhampton	23%	33%	9%	—N/a	21%	14%	58%	42%	—N/a	Labor hold
11 Nov 2017	Galaxy	South Brisbane	29%	38%	29%	—N/a	—N/a	—N/a	—N/a	—N/a	—N/a	—N/a

== See also ==
- Politics of Queensland
