= Electoral results for the district of Maroochydore =

Queensland, Australia, district election results

This is a list of electoral results for the electoral district of Maroochydore in Queensland state elections.

== Members for Maroochydore ==
| Member | Party | Term |
|---|---|---|
| Fiona Simpson | National | 1992–2008 |
| Fiona Simpson | Liberal National | 2008–present |

== Election results ==
=== Elections in the 2020s ===
2024 Queensland state election: Maroochydore
| Party | Candidate | Votes | % | ±% |
|---|---|---|---|---|
| Liberal National | Fiona Simpson | 16,897 | 52.85 | +4.97 |
| Labor | Naomi McQueen | 9,007 | 28.17 | +2.49 |
| Greens | Heinrich Koekemoer | 3,214 | 10.05 | −1.02 |
| One Nation | Kyle Haley | 2,040 | 6.38 | +2.24 |
| Independent | Mark Wadeson | 815 | 2.55 | +2.06 |
| Total formal votes | | 31,973 | 96.22 | +0.44 |
| Informal votes | | 1,256 | 3.78 | −0.44 |
| Turnout | | 33,229 | 86.74 | −0.60 |
Two-party-preferred result
| Liberal National | Fiona Simpson | 19,479 | 60.92 | +1.80 |
| Labor | Naomi McQueen | 12,494 | 39.08 | −1.80 |
| Liberal National hold | | Swing | +1.80 | |

2020 Queensland state election: Maroochydore
| Party | Candidate | Votes | % | ±% |
|---|---|---|---|---|
| Liberal National | Fiona Simpson | 14,426 | 47.88 | +3.21 |
| Labor | Alison Smith | 7,737 | 25.68 | +0.43 |
| Greens | Gabrielle Unverzagt | 3,336 | 11.07 | −2.81 |
| Independent | John Connolly | 1,916 | 6.36 | +6.36 |
| One Nation | Rod McCormack | 1,247 | 4.14 | −12.06 |
| Animal Justice | Tash Poole | 926 | 3.07 | +3.07 |
| United Australia | Greg Searle | 248 | 0.82 | +0.82 |
| Independent | Janet Creevey | 149 | 0.49 | +0.49 |
| Independent | Mark Wadeson | 147 | 0.49 | +0.49 |
| Total formal votes | | 30,132 | 95.78 | −0.48 |
| Informal votes | | 1,327 | 4.22 | +0.48 |
| Turnout | | 31,459 | 87.34 | +1.60 |
Two-party-preferred result
| Liberal National | Fiona Simpson | 17,814 | 59.12 | +0.60 |
| Labor | Alison Smith | 12,318 | 40.88 | −0.60 |
| Liberal National hold | | Swing | +0.60 | |

=== Elections in the 2010s ===
2017 Queensland state election: Maroochydore
| Party | Candidate | Votes | % | ±% |
|---|---|---|---|---|
| Liberal National | Fiona Simpson | 12,661 | 44.7 | −4.8 |
| Labor | Julie McGlone | 7,157 | 25.2 | +1.2 |
| One Nation | Cam Young | 4,592 | 16.2 | +16.2 |
| Greens | Daniel Bryar | 3,936 | 13.9 | +1.4 |
| Total formal votes | | 28,346 | 96.3 | −1.6 |
| Informal votes | | 1,101 | 3.7 | +1.6 |
| Turnout | | 29,447 | 85.7 | +2.0 |
Two-party-preferred result
| Liberal National | Fiona Simpson | 16,587 | 58.5 | −1.8 |
| Labor | Julie McGlone | 11,759 | 41.5 | +1.8 |
| Liberal National hold | | Swing | −1.8 | |

2015 Queensland state election: Maroochydore
| Party | Candidate | Votes | % | ±% |
|---|---|---|---|---|
| Liberal National | Fiona Simpson | 15,267 | 48.46 | −9.70 |
| Labor | Bill Gissane | 7,743 | 24.58 | +4.43 |
| Palmer United | James McDonald | 4,356 | 13.83 | +13.83 |
| Greens | Trudy Byrnes | 4,138 | 13.13 | +0.13 |
| Total formal votes | | 31,504 | 97.93 | +0.10 |
| Informal votes | | 666 | 2.07 | −0.10 |
| Turnout | | 32,170 | 87.78 | −0.44 |
Two-party-preferred result
| Liberal National | Fiona Simpson | 16,767 | 59.27 | −11.66 |
| Labor | Bill Gissane | 11,523 | 40.73 | +11.66 |
| Liberal National hold | | Swing | −11.66 | |

2012 Queensland state election: Maroochydore
| Party | Candidate | Votes | % | ±% |
|---|---|---|---|---|
| Liberal National | Fiona Simpson | 16,339 | 58.16 | +1.88 |
| Labor | Ray Barber | 5,660 | 20.15 | −10.83 |
| Greens | Rainee Skinner | 3,652 | 13.00 | +0.26 |
| Katter's Australian | Mark Maguire | 2,440 | 8.69 | +8.69 |
| Total formal votes | | 28,091 | 97.83 | −0.31 |
| Informal votes | | 622 | 2.17 | +0.31 |
| Turnout | | 28,713 | 88.22 | +0.41 |
Two-party-preferred result
| Liberal National | Fiona Simpson | 17,738 | 70.93 | +8.13 |
| Labor | Ray Barber | 7,269 | 29.07 | −8.13 |
| Liberal National hold | | Swing | +8.13 | |

=== Elections in the 2000s ===
2009 Queensland state election: Maroochydore
| Party | Candidate | Votes | % | ±% |
|---|---|---|---|---|
| Liberal National | Fiona Simpson | 15,398 | 56.3 | +5.9 |
| Labor | Sue Carlos | 8,475 | 31.0 | −2.9 |
| Greens | Brenton Clutterbuck | 3,487 | 12.7 | +2.7 |
| Total formal votes | | 27,360 | 97.9 | |
| Informal votes | | 518 | 2.1 | |
| Turnout | | 27,878 | 87.8 | |
Two-party-preferred result
| Liberal National | Fiona Simpson | 16,131 | 62.8 | +4.5 |
| Labor | Sue Carlos | 9,554 | 37.2 | −4.5 |
| Liberal National hold | | Swing | +4.5 | |

2006 Queensland state election: Maroochydore
| Party | Candidate | Votes | % | ±% |
|---|---|---|---|---|
| National | Fiona Simpson | 14,161 | 54.3 | +8.3 |
| Labor | Debbie Blumel | 8,747 | 33.5 | −4.3 |
| Greens | K C Robinson | 2,604 | 10.0 | +2.1 |
| Independent | Max Phillips | 579 | 2.2 | +2.2 |
| Total formal votes | | 26,091 | 98.2 | −0.1 |
| Informal votes | | 489 | 1.8 | +0.1 |
| Turnout | | 26,580 | 88.2 | −1.1 |
Two-party-preferred result
| National | Fiona Simpson | 15,066 | 60.7 | +6.6 |
| Labor | Debbie Blumel | 9,764 | 39.3 | −6.6 |
| National hold | | Swing | +6.6 | |

2004 Queensland state election: Maroochydore
| Party | Candidate | Votes | % | ±% |
|---|---|---|---|---|
| National | Fiona Simpson | 11,720 | 46.0 | +6.2 |
| Labor | Debbie Blumel | 9,626 | 37.8 | −3.3 |
| Greens | Lindsay Holt | 2,023 | 7.9 | +7.9 |
| One Nation | Patrick Rozanski | 1,183 | 4.6 | −14.5 |
| Independent | Anita Gordon | 907 | 3.6 | +3.6 |
| Total formal votes | | 25,459 | 98.3 | +0.3 |
| Informal votes | | 449 | 1.7 | −0.3 |
| Turnout | | 25,908 | 89.3 | −0.7 |
Two-party-preferred result
| National | Fiona Simpson | 12,703 | 54.1 | +3.3 |
| Labor | Debbie Blumel | 10,794 | 45.9 | −3.3 |
| National hold | | Swing | +3.3 | |

2001 Queensland state election: Maroochydore
| Party | Candidate | Votes | % | ±% |
|---|---|---|---|---|
| Labor | Malcolm Baillie | 9,762 | 41.1 | +15.1 |
| National | Fiona Simpson | 9,446 | 39.8 | +7.8 |
| One Nation | Rowena Wellard | 4,530 | 19.1 | −6.3 |
| Total formal votes | | 23,738 | 98.0 | |
| Informal votes | | 492 | 2.0 | |
| Turnout | | 24,230 | 90.0 | |
Two-party-preferred result
| National | Fiona Simpson | 10,650 | 50.8 | −10.8 |
| Labor | Malcolm Baillie | 10,318 | 49.2 | +10.8 |
| National hold | | Swing | −10.8 | |

=== Elections in the 1990s ===
1998 Queensland state election: Maroochydore
| Party | Candidate | Votes | % | ±% |
|---|---|---|---|---|
| National | Fiona Simpson | 9,426 | 40.3 | −17.3 |
| One Nation | Cheryl Parker | 6,443 | 27.6 | +27.6 |
| Labor | Dan Siskind | 5,635 | 24.1 | −7.6 |
| Greens | John Fitzgerald | 1,157 | 5.0 | −5.7 |
| Democrats | Gaylene Bell | 709 | 3.0 | +3.0 |
| Total formal votes | | 23,370 | 98.5 | −0.1 |
| Informal votes | | 345 | 1.5 | +0.1 |
| Turnout | | 23,715 | 90.7 | +0.6 |
Two-candidate-preferred result
| National | Fiona Simpson | 13,695 | 65.1 | +2.8 |
| One Nation | Cheryl Parker | 7,357 | 34.9 | +34.9 |
| National hold | | Swing | +2.8 | |

1995 Queensland state election: Maroochydore
| Party | Candidate | Votes | % | ±% |
|---|---|---|---|---|
| National | Fiona Simpson | 12,209 | 57.7 | +25.6 |
| Labor | Ken King | 6,709 | 31.7 | −8.0 |
| Greens | Susie Chapman | 2,254 | 10.6 | +10.6 |
| Total formal votes | | 21,172 | 98.6 | +1.0 |
| Informal votes | | 297 | 1.4 | −1.0 |
| Turnout | | 21,469 | 90.1 | |
Two-party-preferred result
| National | Fiona Simpson | 12,928 | 62.3 | +8.2 |
| Labor | Ken King | 7,835 | 37.7 | −8.2 |
| National hold | | Swing | +8.2 | |

1992 Queensland state election: Maroochydore
| Party | Candidate | Votes | % | ±% |
|---|---|---|---|---|
| Labor | Alison Jackson | 7,658 | 39.7 | −2.6 |
| National | Fiona Simpson | 6,185 | 32.0 | +8.1 |
| Liberal | Leslie Treichel | 3,995 | 20.7 | −1.8 |
| Independent | Ian McNiven | 1,463 | 7.6 | +7.6 |
| Total formal votes | | 19,301 | 97.6 | |
| Informal votes | | 475 | 2.4 | |
| Turnout | | 19,776 | 90.3 | |
Two-party-preferred result
| National | Fiona Simpson | 9,582 | 54.0 | +54.0 |
| Labor | Alison Jackson | 8,157 | 46.0 | +0.1 |
| National gain from Liberal | | Swing | +54.0 | |
