= Electoral results for the district of Southern Downs =

Queensland, Australia, district election results

This is a list of electoral results for the electoral district of Southern Downs in Queensland state elections.

== Members for Southern Downs ==
Member	Party	Term
Lawrence Springborg	National	2001–2008
Lawrence Springborg	Liberal National	2008–2017
James Lister	Liberal National	2017–present

== Election results ==
=== Elections in the 2020s ===
2024 Queensland state election: Southern Downs
Party	Candidate	Votes	%	±%
Liberal National	James Lister	17,890	53.91	+2.31
One Nation	Liz Suduk	6,085	18.33	+8.33
Labor	Greg Johnson	5,999	18.08	−7.92
Greens	David Newport	1,870	5.63	+1.53
Family First	Melinda Keller	1,344	4.05	+4.05
Total formal votes		33,188	96.33	
Informal votes		1,265	3.67	
Turnout		34,453	89.18	
Two-candidate-preferred result
Liberal National	James Lister	22,752	68.55	+4.45
One Nation	Liz Suduk	10,436	31.45	+31.45
Liberal National hold		Swing	+4.45	

2020 Queensland state election: Southern Downs
Party	Candidate	Votes	%	±%
Liberal National	James Lister	16,285	51.60	+10.39
Labor	Joel Richters	8,198	25.98	+9.09
One Nation	Rosemary Moulden	3,182	10.08	−10.30
Shooters, Fishers, Farmers	Malcolm Richardson	1,398	4.43	+4.43
Greens	Tom Henderson	1,309	4.15	−0.17
Legalise Cannabis	Deborah Waldron	1,189	3.77	+3.77
Total formal votes		31,561	97.66	+1.32
Informal votes		756	2.34	−1.32
Turnout		32,317	89.70	−0.80
Two-party-preferred result
Liberal National	James Lister	20,229	64.09	−4.00
Labor	Joel Richters	11,332	35.91	+4.00
Liberal National hold		Swing	−4.00	

=== Elections in the 2010s ===
2017 Queensland state election: Southern Downs
Party	Candidate	Votes	%	±%
Liberal National	James Lister	12,797	41.2	−21.6
One Nation	Joshua Coyne	6,331	20.4	+20.4
Labor	Joel Richters	5,245	16.9	−6.6
Independent	Rob Mackenzie	5,042	16.2	+16.2
Greens	Antonia van Geuns	1,340	4.3	−2.9
Independent	Jay Nauss	300	1.0	+1.0
Total formal votes		31,055	96.3	−1.7
Informal votes		1,181	3.7	+1.7
Turnout		32,236	90.5	+0.1
Two-candidate-preferred result
Liberal National	James Lister	19,584	63.1	−6.1
One Nation	Joshua Coyne	11,471	36.9	+36.9
Liberal National hold		Swing	−6.1	

2015 Queensland state election: Southern Downs
Party	Candidate	Votes	%	±%
Liberal National	Lawrence Springborg	19,275	62.79	−3.83
Labor	Louise Ryan	7,201	23.46	+10.05
Greens	Elizabeth Ure	2,200	7.17	+3.25
Family First	John Spellman	2,022	6.59	+4.39
Total formal votes		30,698	98.01	−0.26
Informal votes		623	1.99	+0.26
Turnout		31,321	92.46	+0.13
Two-party-preferred result
Liberal National	Lawrence Springborg	20,008	69.20	−10.57
Labor	Louise Ryan	8,906	30.80	+10.57
Liberal National hold		Swing	−10.57	

2012 Queensland state election: Southern Downs
Party	Candidate	Votes	%	±%
Liberal National	Lawrence Springborg	19,771	66.62	−1.65
Katter's Australian	Ade Larsen	4,112	13.86	+13.86
Labor	Suzanne Kidman	3,979	13.41	−12.45
Greens	Michael Kane	1,163	3.92	−1.95
Family First	John Spellman	652	2.20	+2.20
Total formal votes		29,677	98.27	−0.33
Informal votes		522	1.73	+0.33
Turnout		30,199	92.33	−0.75
Two-candidate-preferred result
Liberal National	Lawrence Springborg	20,713	79.77	+8.69
Katter's Australian	Ade Larsen	5,253	20.23	+20.23
Liberal National hold		Swing	+8.69	

=== Elections in the 2000s ===
2009 Queensland state election: Southern Downs
Party	Candidate	Votes	%	±%
Liberal National	Lawrence Springborg	20,041	68.3	−1.5
Labor	Geoffrey Keating	7,590	25.9	−3.5
Greens	Bob East	1,724	5.9	+5.6
Total formal votes		29,355	98.5	
Informal votes		417	1.5	
Turnout		29,772	93.1	
Two-party-preferred result
Liberal National	Lawrence Springborg	20,315	71.1	+0.7
Labor	Geoffrey Keating	8,266	28.9	−0.7
Liberal National hold		Swing	+0.7	

2006 Queensland state election: Southern Downs
Party	Candidate	Votes	%	±%
National	Lawrence Springborg	17,973	70.3	+0.6
Labor	Andrew Myles	7,602	29.7	+8.1
Total formal votes		25,575	98.1	−0.1
Informal votes		486	1.9	+0.1
Turnout		26,061	92.6	−0.6
National hold		Swing	−4.9	

2004 Queensland state election: Southern Downs
Party	Candidate	Votes	%	±%
National	Lawrence Springborg	17,775	69.7	+18.1
Labor	Leanne King	5,523	21.6	−3.9
One Nation	John Coyle	1,349	5.3	+5.3
Greens	Jonathan Rihan	866	3.4	+3.4
Total formal votes		25,513	98.2	+0.0
Informal votes		460	1.8	−0.0
Turnout		25,973	93.2	−0.5
Two-party-preferred result
National	Lawrence Springborg	18,435	75.2	+8.4
Labor	Leanne King	6,074	24.8	−8.4
National hold		Swing	+8.4	

2001 Queensland state election: Southern Downs
Party	Candidate	Votes	%	±%
National	Lawrence Springborg	13,092	51.6	+6.5
Labor	Stella Rey	6,459	25.5	+6.4
Independent	Joan White	5,818	22.9	+22.9
Total formal votes		25,369	98.2	
Informal votes		451	1.8	
Turnout		25,820	93.7	
Two-party-preferred result
National	Lawrence Springborg	14,627	66.8	−3.0
Labor	Stella Rey	7,278	33.2	+3.0
National hold		Swing	−3.0	
