= Deputy Leader of the Opposition (Queensland) =

Australian political position

Deputy Leader of the Opposition of Queensland Parliament
- Coat of Arms of Queensland

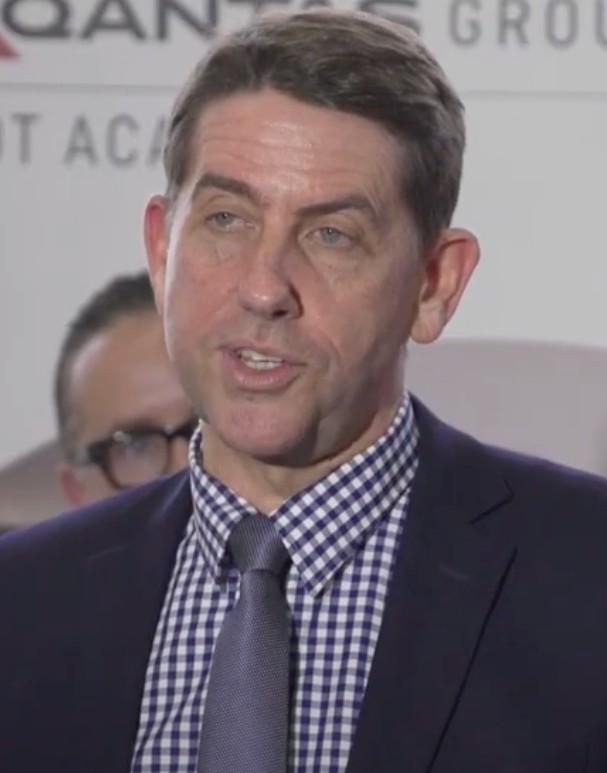
- Incumbent; Cameron Dick since 28 October 2024
- Term length: While deputy leader of the largest political party not in government

The Deputy Leader of the Opposition in Queensland is the title of the deputy leader of the largest minority political party or coalition of parties, known as the Opposition, in the Parliament of Queensland. Prior to 1898, opposition to the government of the day was less organised. The Deputy Leader is responsible for assisting the Leader of the Opposition in managing the Opposition and has a role in administering the Legislative Assembly through the Committee of the Legislative Assembly.

Since 28 October 2024, the position is held by Cameron Dick.

== List of officeholders ==
- Nev Warburton
- Tom Burns
- Rob Borbidge
- Brian Littleproud
- Joan Sheldon
- Jim Elder
- David Watson
- Mike Horan
- Bruce Flegg
- Jeff Seeney
- Fiona Simpson
- Mark McArdle
- Lawrence Springborg
- Tim Nicholls
- Tim Mulherin
- John-Paul Langbroek
- Deb Frecklington
- Tim Mander
- David Janetzki
- Jarrod Bleijie
- Cameron Dick
