= Electoral results for the district of Kawana =

List of electoral results for the district of Kawana in Queensland state elections

This is a list of electoral results for the electoral district of Kawana in Queensland state elections.

== Members for Kawana ==
Member	Party	Term
Chris Cummins	Labor	2001–2006
Steve Dickson	Liberal	2006–2008
Steve Dickson	Liberal National	2008–2009
Jarrod Bleijie	Liberal National	2009–present

== Election results ==
=== Elections in the 2020s ===
2024 Queensland state election: Kawana
Party	Candidate	Votes	%	±%
Liberal National	Jarrod Bleijie	19,036	55.56	+4.72
Labor	Jim Dawson	9,717	28.36	−2.60
Greens	Ian Simons	3,263	9.52	+0.19
One Nation	Peter Hinton	2,247	6.56	+0.50
Total formal votes		34,263	96.54	−0.30
Informal votes		1,229	3.46	+0.30
Turnout		35,492	88.62	−0.59
Two-party-preferred result
Liberal National	Jarrod Bleijie	21,489	62.72	+3.41
Labor	Jim Dawson	12,774	37.28	−3.41
Liberal National hold		Swing	+3.41	

2020 Queensland state election: Kawana
Party	Candidate	Votes	%	±%
Liberal National	Jarrod Bleijie	16,148	50.84	−5.07
Labor	Bill Redpath	9,835	30.96	+5.48
Greens	Anna Sri	2,965	9.33	−1.17
One Nation	Lynette Moussalli	1,924	6.06	+6.06
Animal Justice	Pamela Mariko	569	1.79	+1.79
United Australia	Afrikah McGladrigan	324	1.02	+1.02
Total formal votes		31,765	96.84	+1.73
Informal votes		1,038	3.16	−1.73
Turnout		32,803	89.21	+1.39
Two-party-preferred result
Liberal National	Jarrod Bleijie	18,840	59.31	−3.76
Labor	Bill Redpath	12,925	40.69	+3.76
Liberal National hold		Swing	−3.76	

=== Elections in the 2010s ===
2017 Queensland state election: Kawana
Party	Candidate	Votes	%	±%
Liberal National	Jarrod Bleijie	16,268	55.9	+5.3
Labor	Mark Moss	7,415	25.5	−1.1
Greens	Annette Spendlove	3,058	10.5	+1.6
Independent	Michael Jessop	1,472	5.1	+2.3
Independent	Jeremy Davey	887	3.0	+3.0
Total formal votes		29,100	95.1	−2.5
Informal votes		1,499	4.9	+2.5
Turnout		30,599	87.8	+1.6
Two-party-preferred result
Liberal National	Jarrod Bleijie	18,354	63.1	+2.9
Labor	Mark Moss	10,746	36.9	−2.9
Liberal National hold		Swing	+2.9	

2015 Queensland state election: Kawana
Party	Candidate	Votes	%	±%
Liberal National	Jarrod Bleijie	15,909	50.39	−16.45
Labor	Mark Moss	8,422	26.68	+8.81
Palmer United	Jeremy Davey	3,693	11.70	+11.70
Greens	Marcus Finch	2,743	8.69	+0.36
Independent	Michael Jessop	516	1.63	+1.63
Independent	Jason Deller	287	0.91	+0.91
Total formal votes		31,570	97.71	−0.11
Informal votes		740	2.29	+0.11
Turnout		32,310	89.76	−0.87
Two-party-preferred result
Liberal National	Jarrod Bleijie	16,991	60.09	−16.17
Labor	Mark Moss	11,285	39.91	+16.17
Liberal National hold		Swing	−16.17	

2012 Queensland state election: Kawana
Party	Candidate	Votes	%	±%
Liberal National	Jarrod Bleijie	19,132	66.84	+14.57
Labor	Bruce Garner	5,114	17.87	−19.87
Greens	Gabrielle Roberts	2,384	8.33	−1.66
Katter's Australian	Paul Spencer	1,994	6.97	+6.97
Total formal votes		28,624	97.82	−0.05
Informal votes		637	2.18	+0.05
Turnout		29,261	90.62	−0.83
Two-party-preferred result
Liberal National	Jarrod Bleijie	20,111	76.26	+19.33
Labor	Bruce Garner	6,261	23.74	−19.33
Liberal National hold		Swing	+19.33	

=== Elections in the 2000s ===
2009 Queensland state election: Kawana
Party	Candidate	Votes	%	±%
Liberal National	Jarrod Bleijie	14,027	52.3	+4.7
Labor	Jenny Goodwin	10,127	37.7	−4.5
Greens	Lindsay Holt	2,680	10.0	−0.2
Total formal votes		26,834	97.5	
Informal votes		584	2.5	
Turnout		27,418	91.5	
Two-party-preferred result
Liberal National	Jarrod Bleijie	14,524	56.9	+4.3
Labor	Jenny Goodwin	10,989	43.1	−4.3
Liberal National hold		Swing	+4.3	

2006 Queensland state election: Kawana
Party	Candidate	Votes	%	±%
Liberal	Steve Dickson	15,184	49.9	+7.9
Labor	Chris Cummins	11,755	38.6	−5.7
Greens	Lindsay Holt	3,485	11.5	+5.1
Total formal votes		30,424	98.0	−0.3
Informal votes		633	2.0	+0.3
Turnout		31,057	90.5	−1.4
Two-party-preferred result
Liberal	Steve Dickson	16,061	55.7	+7.2
Labor	Chris Cummins	12,785	44.3	−7.2
Liberal gain from Labor		Swing	+7.2	

2004 Queensland state election: Kawana
Party	Candidate	Votes	%	±%
Labor	Chris Cummins	12,570	44.3	+1.8
Liberal	Harry Burnett	11,934	42.0	+3.6
One Nation	Paul Westbury	2,060	7.3	−11.8
Greens	Susan McLeod	1,826	6.4	+6.4
Total formal votes		28,390	98.3	+0.3
Informal votes		495	1.7	−0.3
Turnout		28,885	91.9	−1.2
Two-party-preferred result
Labor	Chris Cummins	13,737	51.5	−1.1
Liberal	Harry Burnett	12,949	48.5	+1.1
Labor hold		Swing	−1.1	

2001 Queensland state election: Kawana
Party	Candidate	Votes	%	±%
Labor	Chris Cummins	10,446	42.5	+18.1
Liberal	Bruce Laming	9,438	38.4	−8.5
One Nation	Kevin Savage	4,708	19.1	−3.6
Total formal votes		24,592	98.0	
Informal votes		496	2.0	
Turnout		25,088	93.1	
Two-party-preferred result
Labor	Chris Cummins	11,801	52.6	+18.7
Liberal	Bruce Laming	10,625	47.4	−18.7
Labor gain from Liberal		Swing	+18.7	
