= Jeff Seeney =

Australian politician (born 1957)

The Honourable Jeff Seeney

33rd Deputy Premier of Queensland
- In office 26 March 2012 – 14 February 2015
- Premier: Campbell Newman
- Preceded by: Andrew Fraser
- Succeeded by: Jackie Trad

Manager of Opposition Business in Queensland
- In office 9 May 2016 – 25 November 2017
- Leader: Tim Nicholls
- Preceded by: Ray Stevens
- Succeeded by: Jarrod Bleijie
- In office 6 April 2009 – 23 March 2011
- Leader: John-Paul Langbroek
- Preceded by: John-Paul Langbroek
- Succeeded by: David Gibson

Minister for State Development of Queensland
- In office 26 March 2012 – 14 February 2015
- Premier: Campbell Newman
- Preceded by: Andrew Fraser
- Succeeded by: Anthony Lynham

Minister for Infrastructure and Planning of Queensland
- In office 3 April 2012 – 14 February 2015
- Premier: Campbell Newman
- Preceded by: Paul Lucas (as Minister for Local Government)
- Succeeded by: Jackie Trad

Deputy Leader of the Liberal National Party
- In office 2 April 2011 – 14 February 2015
- Leader: Campbell Newman
- Preceded by: Lawrence Springborg
- Succeeded by: John-Paul Langbroek

Leader of the Opposition of Queensland
- In office 22 March 2011 – 24 March 2012
- Deputy: Tim Nicholls
- Preceded by: John-Paul Langbroek
- Succeeded by: Annastacia Palaszczuk
- In office 14 September 2006 – 29 January 2008
- Deputy: Fiona Simpson
- Preceded by: Lawrence Springborg
- Succeeded by: Lawrence Springborg

Shadow Minister for Mines and Energy
- In office 29 January 2008 – 23 March 2011
- Leader: Lawrence Springborg; John-Paul Langbroek
- Preceded by: Shane Knuth
- Succeeded by: Jack Dempsey (Mining and Resources Management); Steve Dickson (Energy and Water Utilities)

Leader of the Queensland National Party
- In office 14 September 2006 – 29 January 2008
- Deputy: Fiona Simpson
- Preceded by: Lawrence Springborg
- Succeeded by: Lawrence Springborg

Shadow Treasurer of Queensland
- In office 8 March 2004 – 27 September 2005
- Leader: Lawrence Springborg
- Preceded by: Bob Quinn
- Succeeded by: Bob Quinn
- In office 9 February 2003 – 22 April 2003
- Leader: Lawrence Springborg
- Preceded by: Mike Horan
- Succeeded by: Bob Quinn

Deputy Leader of the Queensland National Party
- In office 4 February 2003 – 14 September 2006
- Leader: Lawrence Springborg
- Preceded by: Vaughan Johnson
- Succeeded by: Fiona Simpson

Shadow Minister for Energy
- In office 8 March 2004 – 21 September 2006
- Leader: Lawrence Springborg
- Preceded by: David Watson
- Succeeded by: Shane Knuth
- In office 9 February 2003 – 22 April 2003
- Leader: Lawrence Springborg
- Preceded by: Mike Horan
- Succeeded by: David Watson

Shadow Minister for Mines
- In office 13 December 1999 – 8 August 2006
- Leader: Rob Borbidge; Mike Horan; Lawrence Springborg
- Preceded by: Marc Rowell
- Succeeded by: Ray Hopper

Member of the Queensland Parliament for Callide
- In office 13 June 1998 – 25 November 2017
- Preceded by: Di McCauley
- Succeeded by: Colin Boyce

Personal details
- Born: 2 February 1957 (age 69) Brisbane, Queensland
- Party: Liberal National Party (2008–present)
- Other political affiliations: The Nationals (before 2008)

Jeffrey William Seeney (born 2 February 1957) is an Australian former politician and the former Deputy Premier, Minister for State Development and Minister for Infrastructure and Planning of Queensland. He was a member of the Legislative Assembly of Queensland from 1998 to 2017, representing Callide for the Nationals (1998–2008) and merged Liberal National Party (2008–2017).

Seeney was Leader of the Opposition from September 2006 until January 2008 when he was ousted in favour of his predecessor, Lawrence Springborg. In March 2011, successive leader John-Paul Langbroek stood down in favour of Brisbane Lord Mayor Campbell Newman. Seeney was elected as leader of the LNP’s Parliamentary Party and became the opposition leader in the Parliament while Newman led the LNP’s team of candidatesinto the 2012 Queensland state election. The LNP won a landslide victory at that election, and as per a previous agreement Seeney ceded his post as LNP parliamentary leader to Newman, clearing the way for Newman to become Premier of Queensland.

After the LNP lost power in the 2015 state election, Seeney moved to the backbench. He retired at the 2017 state election.

== Political career ==
Jeff Seeney served on the Monto shire council from 1992 to 1998, serving as the deputy mayor for the last four years. During this time, he worked on the National Party's State Central Council from 1991 to 1998. He was elected to parliament in the 1998 Queensland election. Seeney was elected deputy leader of the National Party alongside leader Lawrence Springborg in February 2003. He adopted a personal political slogan of being “all about country towns and country people” and was recognised by both sides of Parliament as being a reliable and pragmatic voice for regional Queensland.

He became Opposition leader in 2006 after Springborg did not contest the position following his loss of two subsequent elections. As Opposition Leader he provided bipartisan support to facilitate the development of the coal seam gas industry in Queensland enraging many of his rural based parliamentary colleagues and Federal National Party Members.

Widely thought by parliament as an aggressive tactician he was renowned for the role of the Leader of Opposition Business which often requires a tactical and aggressive approach. He also held a range of Shadow Ministers including Mines and Energy, Natural Resources and Treasury. In the role of Deputy Premier Seeney drove the Governments strategy of governing for economic growth designed to balance the asset sales agenda driven by his colleagues Premier Newman and Treasurer Tim Nichols. He also delivered on promises made as Opposition Leader to develop regional planning legislation to facilitate the coal seam gas industry and protect landholders rights and prime agricultural land. He demanded funding for the Royalties for Regions program investing $500 million into regional Queenslands infrastructure at a time when the Government was cutting expenditure across the board as his price for supporting Treasuries asset sales program.

He was the architect of a review of Queensland’s land title system that saw huge areas of leasehold land converted to freehold title on the basis of a nett present value calculation of the value of the lease payments

== Leadership ==
Following the Coalition's loss at the 2006 state election, standing leader Lawrence Springborg relinquished leadership of the opposition and the Queensland National Party.

On 18 September 2006, Seeney was endorsed as the new state National Party leader, with Maroochydore representative Fiona Simpson as his deputy.

Seeney had stood for the position on a ticket with Toowoomba based colleague Stuart Copeland and Seeney and Simpson are reported to have never got along from the beginning. This conflict, combined with the leadership instability and performance of the Liberal Party under their leader Bruce Flagg combined to keep the opposition on the back foot.

On 21 January 2008, after opinion polls showed Seeney well behind newly installed premier Anna Bligh, Springborg launched a party-room coup with the support of Simpson and ousted Seeney as leader. After the merging of the National and Liberal parties, Seeney became a member of the Liberal National Party. Springborg kept him in the shadow ministry as Shadow Minister for Mines and Energy which he retained under Springborg's successor, John-Paul Langbroek.

On 22 March 2011, Seeney once again became opposition leader for a second time following Langbroek's resignation from that position after the LNP’s party hierarchy supported Campbell Newman in his effort to become Premier even though Seeney’s return to the Opposition leader’s position was not part of the Newman plan and came as a shock to LNP Party officials driving the Newman for Premier plan. After it became apparent that a by-election could not be arranged to get Newman into the legislature, it was announced that Seeney would act as interim parliamentary leader of the LNP—and hence Leader of the Opposition. Tim Nicholls served as his deputy. Newman, who had won preselection for Ashgrove, would lead the LNP election team from outside parliament. Seeney agreed that if Newman was elected to the legislature, he would cede his post as parliamentary leader to Newman.

The LNP won the largest majority government in Queensland history at the 2012 election. The next day, with counting still underway even though the LNP's victory was beyond doubt, Bligh resigned as premier and state Labor leader and announced her retirement from politics. Seeney resigned as leader of the LNP Parliamentary Party to make way for Newman in accordance with their pre-election agreement and Newman announced that he would name Seeney as Deputy Premier and Minister for State Development, with additional responsibility for the Coordinator General. Seeney served in an interim three-man cabinet with Newman and Nicholls until the full ministry was sworn in on 3 April. He was the highest-ranking minister from the Nationals side of the merger.

Seeney was Deputy Premier for the entirety of the Newman Government's tenure despite deep divisions developing between the Premiers office on the one hand and Seeney andTreasurer Tim Nicholls on the other. His tenure as Deputy Premier though repeatedly threatened by Newman only came to an end with the Government’s defeat at the 2015 election with Newman himself losing his seat. After the election defeat Springborg made his comeback as LNP leader.

The following year in 2016, Seeney's past leadership feud with Springborg resurfaced when Seeney was the key architect in displacing Springborg as leader by Seeney's former deputy and long time friend and parliamentary ally Tim Nicholls.

== Personal life ==
Seeney holds a Master's degree in Business Management MBA from the University of New England and a certificate in rural business management from QUT and was the former Deputy Mayor of Monto a shire Council and chairman of the Burnett Inland Economic Development Organisation (BIEDO).

Political offices
Preceded by Andrew Fraser	Deputy Premier of Queensland; 2012–2015	Succeeded by Jackie Trad
Preceded by Lawrence Springborg	Leader of the Opposition in Queensland; 2006–2008	Succeeded by Lawrence Springborg
Preceded by John-Paul Langbroek	Leader of the Opposition in Queensland; 2011–2012	Succeeded by Annastacia Palaszczuk
Party political offices
Preceded by Lawrence Springborg	Leader of the National Party in Queensland; 2006–2008	Succeeded by Lawrence Springborg
Preceded by John-Paul Langbroek	Parliamentary Leader of the Liberal National Party in Queensland; 2011–2012	Succeeded by Campbell Newman
Parliament of Queensland
Preceded by Di McCauley	Member for Callide; 1998–2017	Succeeded by Colin Boyce
