= 2016 Liberal National Party of Queensland leadership spill =

Leader selection contests within Queensland's opposition party

- 6 May 2016
- Leadership election
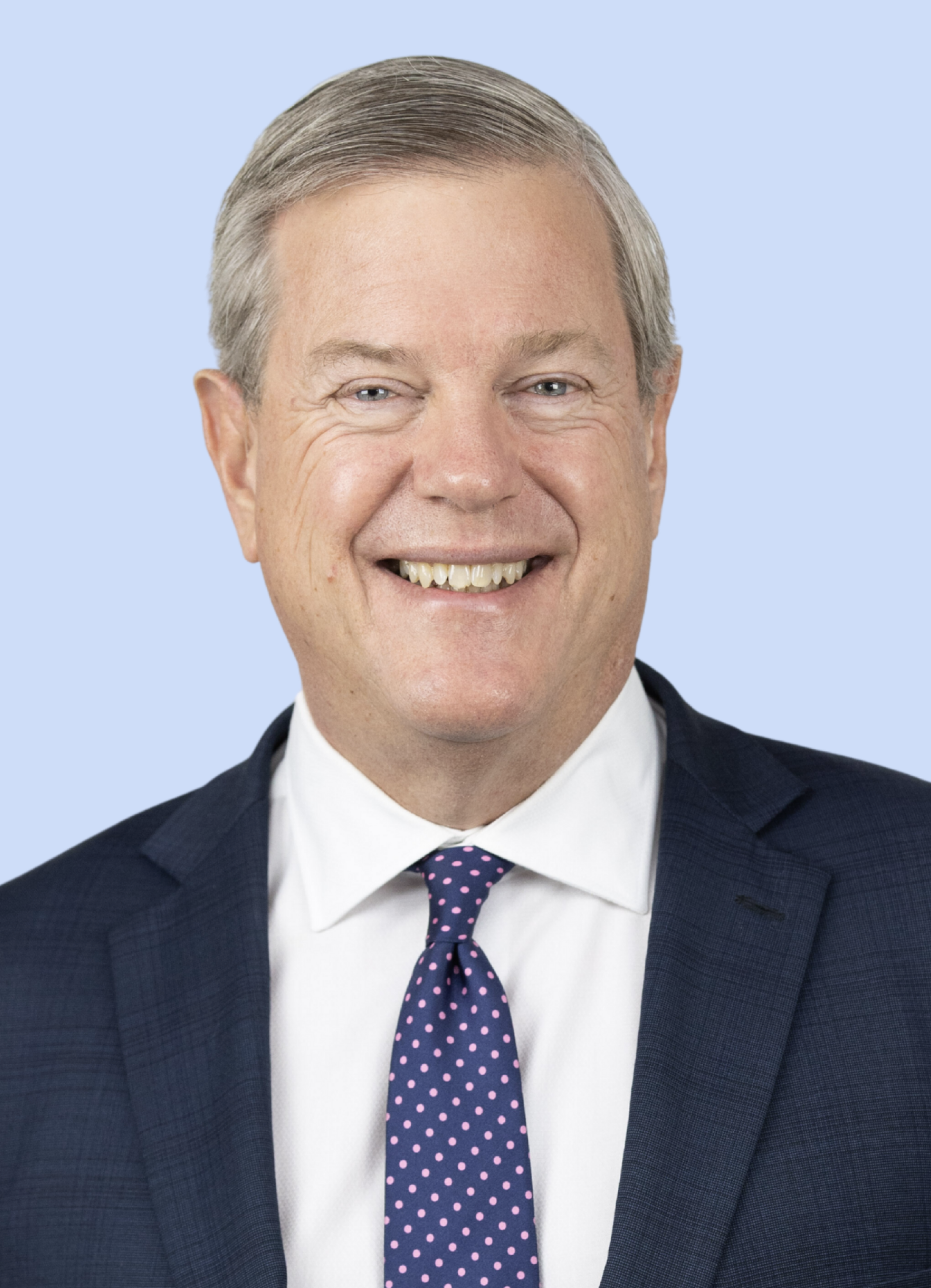

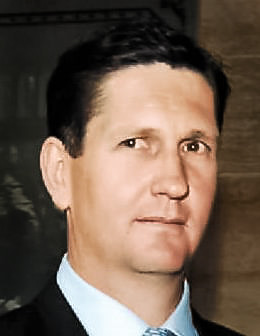

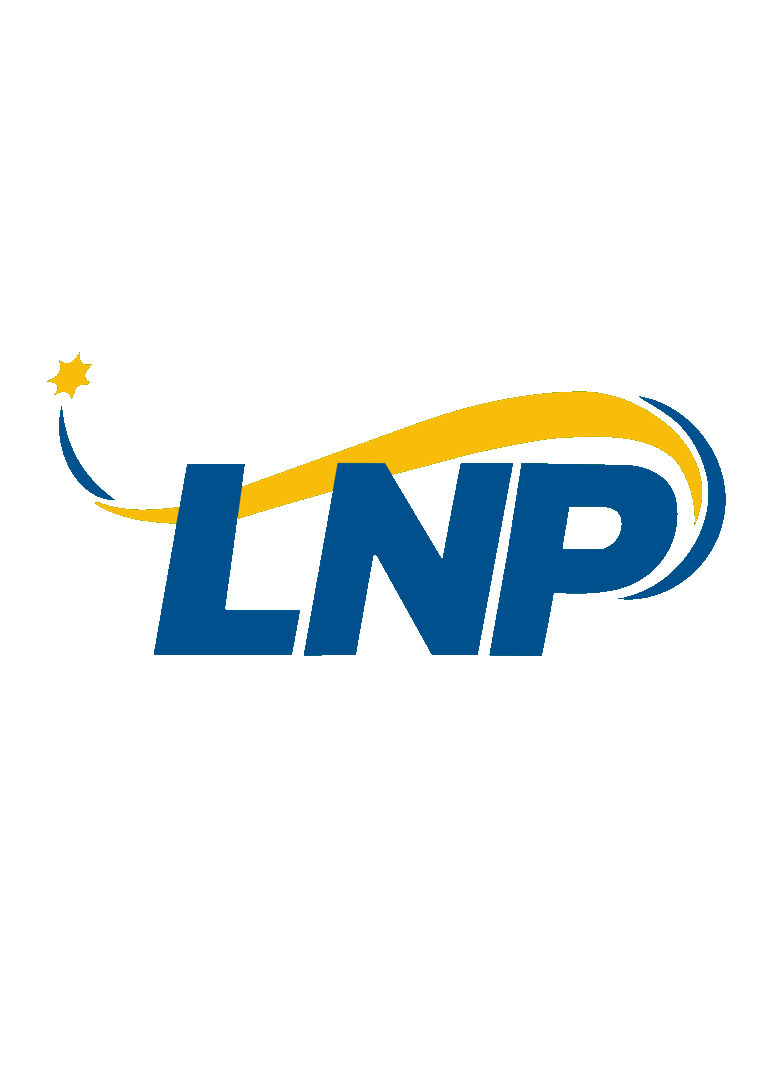
Candidate	Tim Nicholls	Lawrence Springborg	Tim Mander
First round	14	17	10
Second round	22	19	Eliminated
Seat	Clayfield	Southern Downs	Everton
Leader before election
Lawrence Springborg
Elected Leader
Tim Nicholls
- Deputy leadership election
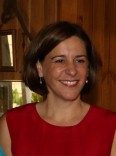
Candidate	Deb Frecklington
Caucus vote	Unopposed
Seat	Nanango
Deputy before election
John-Paul Langbroek
Elected Deputy
Deb Frecklington

The 2016 Liberal National Party of Queensland leadership spill was held on 6 May 2016 to elect a new leader of the Liberal National Party of Queensland (LNP) and, ex officio, Leader of the Opposition.

Tim Nicholls was elected as the new leader, defeating sitting leader Lawrence Springborg in the second round of voting. Deb Frecklington was elected unopposed as deputy leader after John-Paul Langbroek did not recontest the position.

== Candidates ==
=== Leader ===
==== Declared ====
Candidate	Electorate	Announced
Tim Mander	Everton	4 May 2016
Tim Nicholls	Clayfield	5 May 2016
Lawrence Springborg	Southern Downs	4 May 2016

== Results ==
=== Leader ===
2016 Liberal National Party of Queensland leadership spill: Leader
Party	Candidate	Votes	%	±%
Liberal National	Lawrence Springborg	17	41.5	
Liberal National	Tim Nicholls	14	34.1	
Liberal National	Tim Mander	10	24.4	
Second ballot result
Liberal National	Tim Nicholls	22	53.7	
Liberal National	Lawrence Springborg	19	46.3	
Total votes		41		

=== Deputy leader ===
2016 Liberal National Party of Queensland leadership spill: Deputy leader
Party	Candidate	Votes	%	±%
Liberal National	Deb Frecklington	unopposed		
Total votes		41		
