= Christian Rowan =

Australian politician and physician

The Honourable Dr Christian Rowan MP
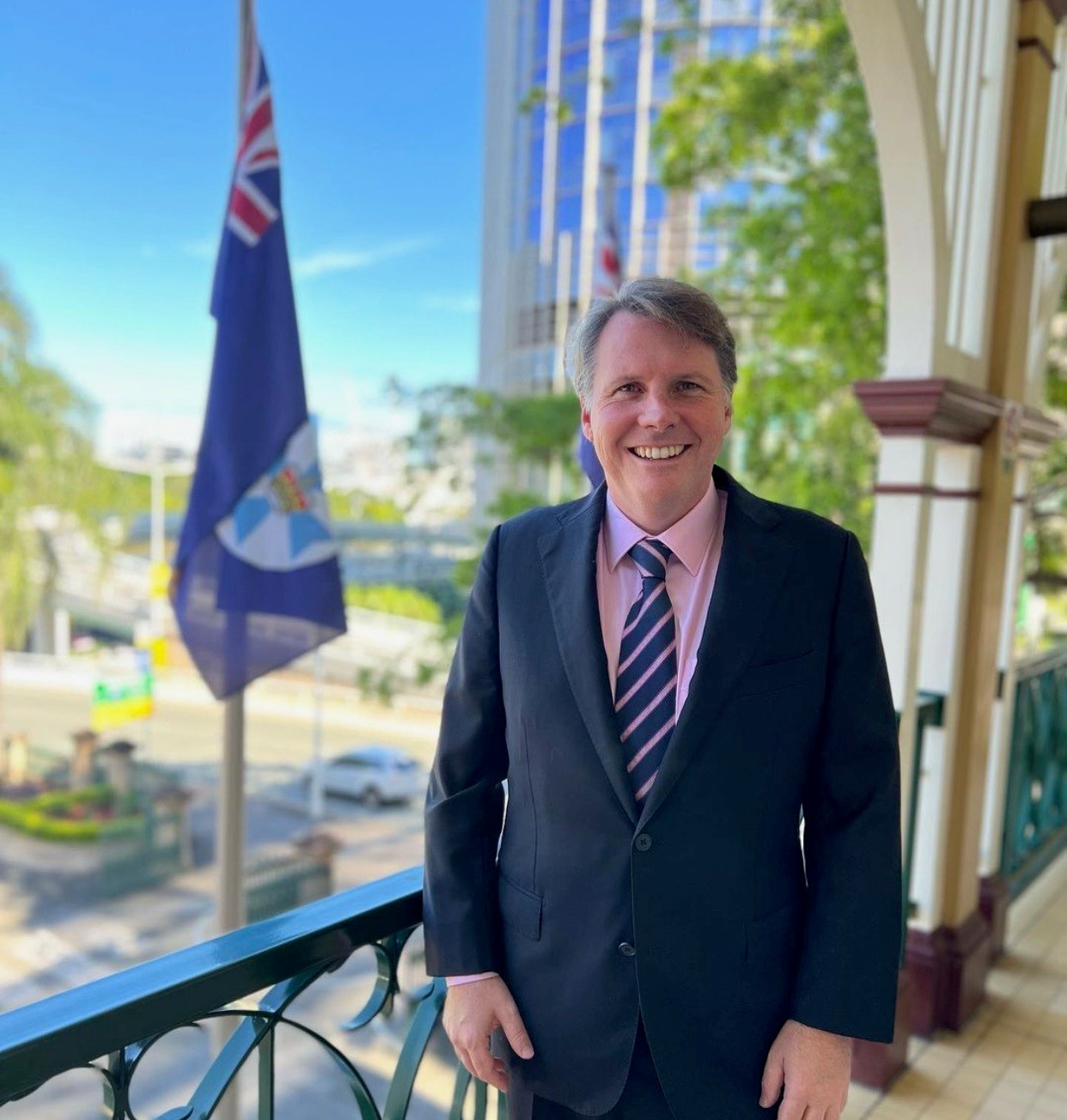
- Queensland Parliament

Leader of the House
- Incumbent
- Assumed office 13 November 2024
- Leader: David Crisafulli
- Preceded by: Mick de Brenni

Assistant Minister to the Premier on Matters of State and New Citizens
- Incumbent
- Assumed office 28 November 2024
- Leader: David Crisafulli
- Preceded by: Jennifer Howard (2020)
Shadow Ministerial Positions
Shadow Minister for Education
In office 15 November 2020 – 28 October 2024
Leader	David Crisafulli
Preceded by	Jarrod Bleijie
Succeeded by	Di Farmer
Shadow Minister for Arts
In office 15 December 2017 – 28 October 2024
Leader	Deb Frecklington; David Crisafulli
Preceded by	Tim Nicholls
Succeeded by	Leeanne Enoch
Shadow Minister for Communities, Disability Services and Seniors Shadow Minister for Aboriginal and Torres Strait Islander Partnerships
In office 15 December 2017 – 15 November 2020
Leader	Deb Frecklington
Preceded by	Ros Bates (Communities, Disability Services and Seniors); Steve Minnikin (Aboriginal and Torres Strait Islander Partnerships)
Succeeded by	John-Paul Langbroek (Communities, Disability Services and Seniors); John-Paul Langbroek (Aboriginal and Torres Strait Islander Partnerships)
Shadow Minister for Environment and Heritage Protection, Shadow Minister for National Parks and the Great Barrier Reef
In office 6 May 2016 – 15 December 2017
Leader	Tim Nicholls
Preceded by	Stephen Bennett
Succeeded by	David Crisafulli

Member of the Queensland Legislative Assembly for Moggill
- Incumbent
- Assumed office 31 January 2015
- Preceded by: Bruce Flegg

Personal details
- Born: 5 October 1972 (age 54) Brisbane, Queensland
- Party: Liberal National Party
- Children: 4 children
- Education: University of Queensland
- Profession: Physician

Dr Christian Andrew Carr Rowan (born 5 October 1972) is an Australian politician and specialist physician. He has been the Liberal National Party State Member for Moggill in the Queensland Legislative Assembly since 2015.

== Professional career ==
Rowan is a specialist physician in addiction medicine and medical administration.

Rowan served as President of the Rural Doctors Association of Queensland (RDAQ) from 2006 to 2007, and served as President of the Australian Medical Association of Queensland (AMAQ) from 2013 to 2014. Rowan was awarded an Australian College of Rural and Remote Medicine Distinguished Service Award in 2010.

Rowan was previously the Deputy Chief Medical Officer for Uniting Care Health and Director of Medical Services at St Andrew's War Memorial Hospital. He has also worked as a Director of Medical Services and Medical Superintendent in rural and regional Queensland, predominantly in South-West Queensland but also on the Darling Downs.

Rowan has also advocated about the growing public health problems of over-the-counter codeine misuse and the emergence of new synthetic drugs.

Rowan has been a Medical Officer in the 2nd Health Battalion (Australia) of the Australian Army located at the Enoggera Barracks in Brisbane.

== Political career ==
At the 2004 Queensland state election, Rowan was a candidate for the Queensland National Party in the seat of Gympie, finishing in third place behind Labor and incumbent Independent MP Elisa Roberts. Eleven years later, at the 2015 state election, he won the seat of Moggill for the Liberal National Party of Queensland, defeating Labor candidate Louisa Pink with 58.2 percent of the two-party preferred vote. He was a Deputy Chair of the Health, Communities, Disability Services and Domestic and Family Violence Prevention Committee in the 55th Queensland Parliament.

In 2014, Rowan was a spokesman for the Australian Medical Association when he informed doctors he supported the Newman Liberal National Party of Queensland Government's public hospital contracts. Rowan said the contracts had the "capacity to drive productivity, efficiency, value for money and enhance transparency of outcomes for the public hospital system." The Australian Medical Association federal president Steve Hambleton replaced Rowan as spokesman for the Queensland campaign to force the State Liberal National Party of Queensland Government to continue negotiating with doctors over dispute resolution procedures, transfers, and dismissal procedures. Rudd reaffirmed that the Queensland division of the association fully supported the doctors' stance on the contracts.

Rowan in his maiden speech to the Queensland Parliament said "The sustainability of our health system requires productivity, efficiency, accountability, transparency and the ongoing measurement and public reporting of the effectiveness of government investment. Unfortunately, often in health-care individuals and sectional interest groups pursue conflicted agendas related to power, profit and prestige with little regard to the interests of patients, despite the public protestations of those individuals and sectional interest groups to the contrary. That was evident during the recent public sector medical contracts dispute in Queensland."

In 2015, Rowan called for a debate about reinstating the Death penalty for terrorist acts. In 2019, Rowan argued that pill testing should be considered as a harm minimisation strategy in Queensland. Following the October 2024 Queensland state election, Rowan was appointed as Leader of the House (Queensland) in the Legislative Assembly of Queensland as well as Assistant Minister to the Premier on Matters of State and New Citizens.

== Early life and education ==
Rowan was born in Brisbane, Australia. He completed his secondary education at the Anglican Church Grammar School in East Brisbane. He received his Bachelor of Medicine and Bachelor of Surgery from The University of Queensland in 1996. He attained a Master of Diplomacy & Trade from Monash University in 2002, with this postgraduate tertiary qualification covering diplomacy and statecraft, economics, trade policy, international law and contemporary politics. Rowan is a Fellow of the Royal Australasian College of Medical Administrators, the Australian College of Health Service Management, the Australasian Chapter of Addiction Medicine within the Royal Australasian College of Physicians, the Royal Australian College of General Practitioners and the Australian College of Rural & Remote Medicine.

Parliament of Queensland
Preceded by Bruce Flegg	Member for Moggill; 2015–present	Incumbent
