= James Lister (politician) =

Australian politician

James Lister MP

Member of the Queensland Legislative Assembly for Southern Downs
- Incumbent
- Assumed office 25 November 2017
- Preceded by: Lawrence Springborg

Personal details
- Born: 6 April 1976 (age 50) Benowa, Queensland, Australia
- Party: Liberal National
- Education: Queensland University of Technology

Military service
- Allegiance: Australia
- Branch/service: Royal Australian Air Force
- Years of service: 2000–2017
- Rank: Squadron leader

James Paul Lister (born 6 April 1976) is an Australian politician. He has been the Liberal National Party member for Southern Downs in the Queensland Legislative Assembly since 2017.

Lister was born in Benowa, Queensland, and holds a Bachelor of Applied Science from the Queensland University of Technology. He served in the Royal Australian Air Force from 2000 to 2017, during which time he was aide-de-camp to Michael Jeffrey, 24th Governor-General of Australia, in 2004 and Dame Quentin Bryce, 24th Governor of Queensland, from 2007 to 2008.

He also holds an advanced grade amateur (ham) radio licence, with the callsign VK4JPL, and is a member of the Border Ranges Amateur Radio Club.

Parliament of Queensland
Preceded by Lawrence Springborg	Member for Southern Downs; 2017–present	Incumbent
