= Jarrod Bleijie =

Australian politician (born 1982)

The Honourable Jarrod Bleijie MP, JP
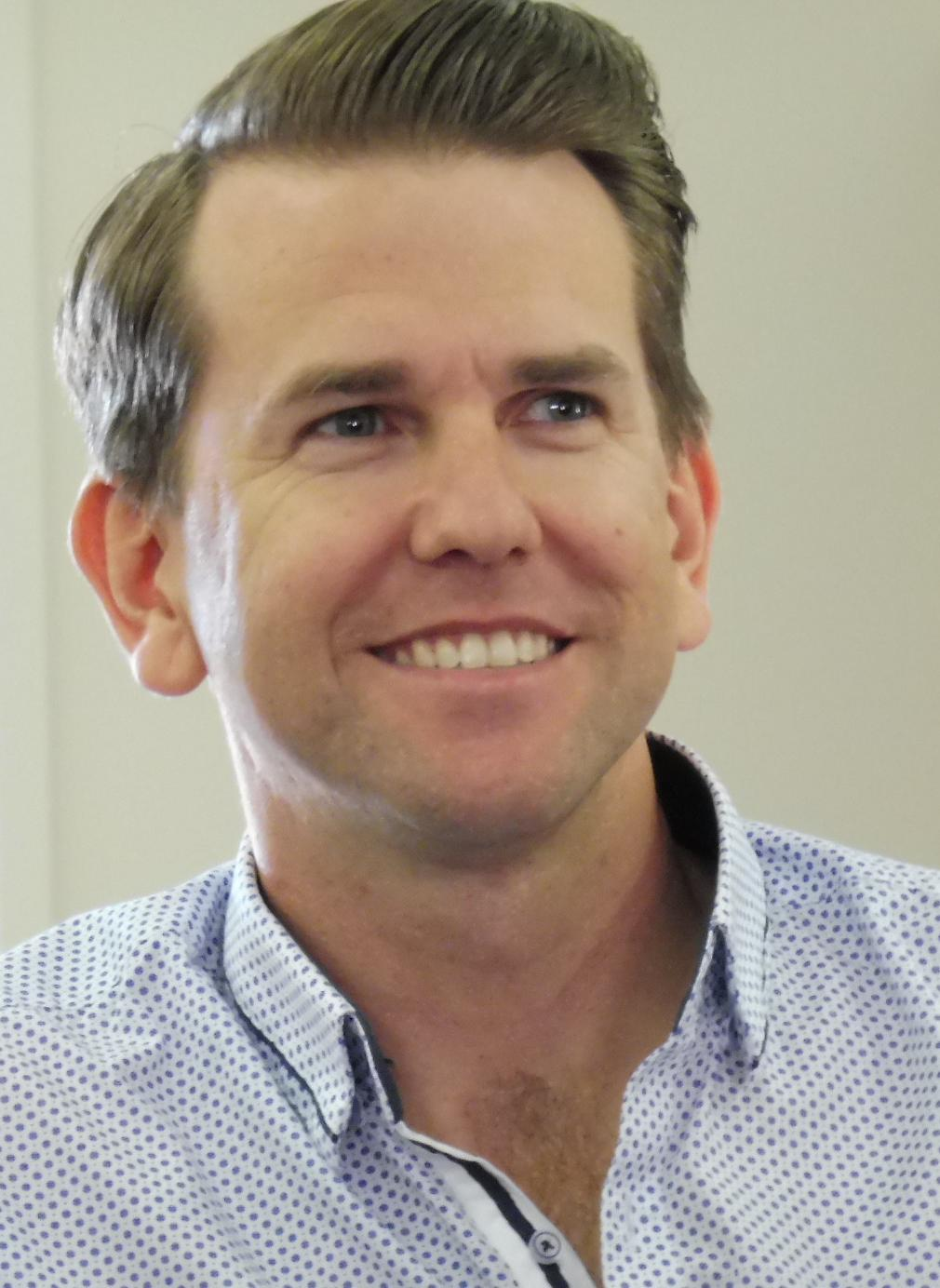
- Bleijie in 2024

37th Deputy Premier of Queensland
- Incumbent
- Assumed office 28 October 2024
- Premier: David Crisafulli
- Preceded by: Cameron Dick

Minister for State Development and Infrastructure
- Incumbent
- Assumed office 28 October 2024
- Premier: David Crisafulli
- Preceded by: Grace Grace

Minister for Industrial Relations
- Incumbent
- Assumed office 28 October 2024
- Premier: David Crisafulli
- Preceded by: Grace Grace

Deputy Leader of the Liberal National Party
- Incumbent
- Assumed office 14 March 2022
- Leader: David Crisafulli
- Preceded by: David Janetzki

Attorney-General of Queensland and Minister for Justice
- In office 3 April 2012 – 14 February 2015
- Premier: Campbell Newman
- Preceded by: Paul Lucas
- Succeeded by: Yvette D'Ath
Opposition portfolios
Deputy Leader of the Opposition in Queensland
In office 14 March 2022 – 28 October 2024
Premier	Annastacia Palaszczuk; Steven Miles
Leader	David Crisafulli
Preceded by	David Janetzki
Succeeded by	Cameron Dick
Shadow Minister for Finance
In office 16 November 2020 – 28 October 2024
Leader	David Crisafulli
Preceded by	Position established
Succeeded by	Position abolished
Shadow Minister for Industrial Relations
In office 10 May 2016 – 28 October 2024
Leader	Tim Nicholls; Deb Frecklington; David Crisafulli
Preceded by	Ian Walker
Succeeded by	Grace Grace
Manager of Opposition Business in Queensland
In office 15 December 2017 – 14 March 2022
Leader	Deb Frecklington; David Crisafulli
Preceded by	Jeff Seeney
Succeeded by	Andrew Powell
Shadow Minister for Education
In office 15 December 2017 – 15 November 2020
Leader	Deb Frecklington
Preceded by	Tracy Davis
Succeeded by	Christian Rowan
Shadow Minister for Employment, Skills and Training
In office 10 May 2016 – 15 December 2017
Leader	Tim Nicholls
Preceded by	Tim Nicholls
Succeeded by	Fiona Simpson
Shadow Minister for Police, Fire, Emergency Services and Corrective Services
In office 20 February 2015 – 10 May 2016
Leader	Lawrence Springborg
Preceded by	Bill Byrne
Succeeded by	Tim Mander
Shadow Attorney-General and Shadow Minister for Justice
In office 29 November 2010 – 3 April 2012
Leader	John-Paul Langbroek; Campbell Newman
Preceded by	Lawrence Springborg
Succeeded by	Annastacia Palaszczuk

Member of the Legislative Assembly of Queensland for Kawana
- Incumbent
- Assumed office 21 March 2009
- Preceded by: Steve Dickson

Personal details
- Born: 25 January 1982 (age 44) Griffith, New South Wales, Australia
- Party: Liberal National
- Spouse: Sally Lennox
- Children: 3
- Profession: Politician; Lawyer

Jarrod Pieter Bleijie (/bleɪ/ BLAY; born 25 January 1982) is an Australian politician serving as the Deputy Premier of Queensland since 28 October 2024. A member of the Liberal National Party of Queensland (LNP) in the Queensland parliament, Bleijie was elected as the member for Kawana at the 2009 state election, and is the third member since the seat's inception at the 2001 state election. He served as Attorney-General of Queensland from 2012 until 2015 and was appointed Deputy Premier of Queensland in 2024.

== Early life ==
Jarrod Bleijie was born on 25 January 1982 in Griffith, New South Wales. His father is Pieter Bleijie and his mother, Christine (Cooper) Bleijie. They moved to Caloundra, Queensland, in 1989. He attended Griffith Primary School, Caloundra State School, and Caloundra State High School, where he graduated in 2000 as school captain. He studied politics at the University of the Sunshine Coast before transferring to Brisbane to complete a Bachelor of Laws at Queensland University of Technology. He graduated in 2007.

== Career ==
=== Legal career ===
While studying law, Bleijie was employed as an articled clerk initially at the Maroochydore law firm of JJ Riba & Company and then at the Sunshine Coast, Queensland law firm Sajen Legal. Following his graduation, he was employed as a solicitor at Sajen Legal. During his legal career, Bleijie specialised in commercial law and management rights.

=== Parliamentary career ===
He was elected to the Parliament of Queensland in 2009, representing the Sunshine Coast electorate of Kawana.

He was promoted to the shadow ministry as Shadow Attorney-General and Shadow Minister for Justice and Corrective Services by then Opposition Leader John-Paul Langbroek in November 2010. Following a leadership change in March 2011, with former Lord Mayor of Brisbane Campbell Newman taking over the leadership of the LNP from outside the parliament, he was reappointed Shadow Attorney-General, maintaining his Justice responsibilities. He re-contested and won the state seat of Kawana with a two-party preferred swing of 19.9 points, holding the seat by a 26.8-point margin. As of 2012, he had one of the safest seats in the Queensland Parliament.

=== Attorney-General and Minister for Justice (2012–2015) ===
Following a landslide victory for the Newman-led Liberal National Party, in which Labor secured only 7 of 89 seats, in March 2012 newly elected premier Campbell Newman appointed Bleijie to cabinet as Attorney-General and Minister for Justice.

As Attorney-General, Bleijie introduced an amendment that renamed Queensland civil partnerships for same-sex couples into registered relationships and disallowed state-sanctioned ceremonies. Bleijie subsequently unveiled legislation to ban single people and same-sex couples from having a child through surrogacy. In 2015, Bleijie declared his support for same-sex marriage.

=== Since 2015 ===
After the defeat of the Newman government Bleijie remained on the opposition front bench under Lawrence Springborg, Tim Nicholls, Deb Frecklington, and David Crisafulli. In 2022, he became deputy leader of the LNP, and hence Deputy Leader of the Opposition, under Crisafulli.

After the LNP's election win in the 2024 Queensland state election, Bleijie was appointed Deputy Premier of Queensland.

== Criticism ==
=== Communications with Court of Appeal President McMurdo ===
In early 2014, Bleijie released details of a conversation he had with Court of Appeal President Margaret McMurdo concerning the appointment of judges. The week previously, McMurdo had criticised the Queensland government for appointing only one woman in the 17 judicial appointments over the last two years. Bleijie's comments to the media suggested McMurdo had sought a higher judicial appointment for her husband, Supreme Court Judge Philip McMurdo. In an interview with the ABC, Walter Sofronoff QC called for Bleijie's resignation, saying that Bleijie had betrayed McMurdo's confidence and was "unethical". Sofronoff also commented that Bleijie's comments had "the hint of a nasty schoolboy's snicker in it".

=== Hannay v Newman and Bleijie ===
On 1 April 2014, Gold Coast lawyer Chris Hannay instituted proceedings against Bleijie and the Queensland Premier Campbell Newman for defamation. On 6 February 2014, Newman had commented to journalists that lawyers who represent bikies "are hired guns. They take money from people who sell drugs to our teenagers and young people. Yes, everybody's got the right to be defended under the law, but you've got to see it for what it is: they are part of the machine, part of the criminal gang machine, and they will say and do anything to defend their clients, and try to get them off—and indeed progress their dishonest case. They are paid by criminal gangs." Bleijie later remarked that Newman was "referring to Hannay Lawyers, based on the Gold Coast" and that he too was "quite disturbed by their advice and fear campaign". He also noted that he agreed with Newman's comments. The case was settled out-of-court in 2016.

== Personal life ==
He married Sally Lennox in 2002. They have two daughters and a son.

Parliament of Queensland
Preceded by Steve Dickson	Member for Kawana; 2009–present	Incumbent
Political offices
Preceded by Paul Lucas	Attorney-General of Queensland and Minister for Justice; 2012–2015	Succeeded by Yvette D'Ath
Preceded by Cameron Dick	Deputy Premier of Queensland; 2024–present	Incumbent
