= Electoral district of Maroochydore =

State electoral district of Queensland, Australia

Maroochydore Queensland—Legislative Assembly
- Electoral map of Maroochydore 2017
- State: Queensland
- MP: Fiona Simpson
- Party: Liberal National Party
- Namesake: Maroochydore
- Electors: 36,020 (2020)
- Area: 45 km^{2} (17.4 sq mi)
- Coordinates: 26°36′S 153°6′E
Electorates around Maroochydore:
Ninderry	Ninderry	Coral Sea
Ninderry	Maroochydore	Coral Sea
Buderim	Buderim	Kawana

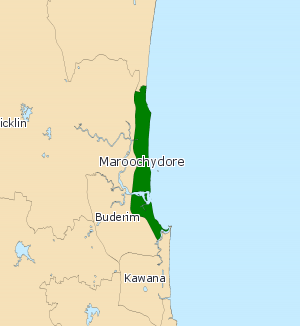
Electoral map of Maroochydore 2008

Maroochydore is an electoral district of the Legislative Assembly in the Australian state of Queensland.

It covers parts of the Sunshine Coast and takes in coastal areas between Coolum Beach and Mooloolaba, including Maroochydore.

The seat is currently held by Fiona Simpson of the Liberal National Party, who has held it since its creation ahead of the 1992 state election. Simpson was the Deputy Leader of the National Party from 2006 to 2008.

== Members for Maroochydore ==
Member	Party	Term
Fiona Simpson	National	1992–2008
Fiona Simpson	Liberal National	2008–present

== Election results ==
2024 Queensland state election: Maroochydore
Party	Candidate	Votes	%	±%
Liberal National	Fiona Simpson	16,897	52.85	+4.97
Labor	Naomi McQueen	9,007	28.17	+2.49
Greens	Heinrich Koekemoer	3,214	10.05	−1.02
One Nation	Kyle Haley	2,040	6.38	+2.24
Independent	Mark Wadeson	815	2.55	+2.06
Total formal votes		31,973	96.22	+0.44
Informal votes		1,256	3.78	−0.44
Turnout		33,229	86.74	−0.60
Two-party-preferred result
Liberal National	Fiona Simpson	19,479	60.92	+1.80
Labor	Naomi McQueen	12,494	39.08	−1.80
Liberal National hold		Swing	+1.80	

Primary vote results in Maroochydore (Parties that have never gotten 5% of the vote are omitted)
National/Liberal National

Liberal

Labor
One Nation
Greens
Palmer United/United Australia Party
Katter's Australian
Independent
View source data.
Two-candidate-preferred vote results in Maroochydore View source data.
