= Lawrence Springborg =

Australian politician (born 1968)

The Honourable Councillor Lawrence Springborg AM
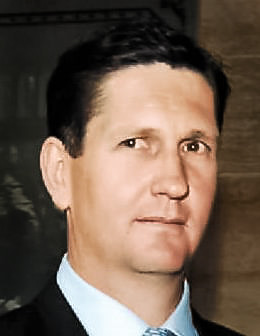

Leader of the Opposition in Queensland Elections: 2004, 2006, 2009
- In office 14 February 2015 – 6 May 2016
- Premier: Annastacia Palaszczuk
- Deputy: John-Paul Langbroek
- Preceded by: Annastacia Palaszczuk
- Succeeded by: Tim Nicholls
- In office 21 January 2008 – 2 April 2009
- Premier: Anna Bligh
- Deputy: Fiona Simpson; Mark McArdle
- Preceded by: Jeff Seeney
- Succeeded by: John-Paul Langbroek
- In office 4 February 2003 – 18 September 2006
- Premier: Peter Beattie
- Deputy: Jeff Seeney
- Preceded by: Mike Horan
- Succeeded by: Jeff Seeney

Minister for Health of Queensland
- In office 3 April 2012 – 14 February 2015
- Premier: Campbell Newman
- Preceded by: Geoff Wilson
- Succeeded by: Cameron Dick

Shadow Minister for State Development, Major Projects, Infrastructure and Planning
- In office 29 November 2010 – 11 April 2011
- Leader: John-Paul Langbroek
- Preceded by: David Gibson
- Succeeded by: Jeff Seeney

Shadow Attorney-General Shadow Minister for Justice
- In office 5 April 2009 – 29 November 2010
- Leader: John-Paul Langbroek
- Preceded by: Mike Horan
- Succeeded by: Jarrod Bleijie
- In office 2 July 1998 – 27 September 2005
- Leader: Rob Borbidge; Mike Horan; Himself
- Preceded by: Matt Foley
- Succeeded by: Mark McArdle

Shadow Minister for Industrial Relations
- In office 5 April 2009 – 29 November 2010
- Leader: John-Paul Langbroek
- Preceded by: Steve Dickson
- Succeeded by: Jann Stuckey

Deputy Leader of the Opposition of Queensland Deputy Leader of the Liberal National Party
- In office 2 April 2009 – 11 April 2011
- Leader: John-Paul Langbroek
- Preceded by: Mark McArdle
- Succeeded by: Tim Nicholls (Opposition); Jeff Seeney (LNP)

Deputy Leader of the Queensland National Party
- In office 26 February 1999 – 2 March 2001
- Leader: Rob Borbidge
- Preceded by: Mike Horan
- Succeeded by: Vaughan Johnson

Minister for Natural Resources of Queensland
- In office 16 February 1998 – 26 June 1998
- Premier: Rob Borbidge
- Preceded by: Howard Hobbs
- Succeeded by: Rod Welford

Queensland Government Chief Whip
- In office 20 February 1996 – 16 February 1998
- Premier: Rob Borbidge
- Preceded by: Don Livingstone
- Succeeded by: Rob Mitchell

Member of the Queensland Parliament for Southern Downs
- In office 17 February 2001 – 25 November 2017
- Preceded by: New seat
- Succeeded by: James Lister

Member of the Queensland Parliament for Warwick
- In office 19 September 1992 – 17 February 2001
- Preceded by: Des Booth
- Succeeded by: Seat abolished

Member of the Queensland Parliament for Carnarvon
- In office 2 December 1989 – 19 September 1992
- Preceded by: Peter McKechnie
- Succeeded by: Seat abolished

Mayor of the Goondiwindi Region
- Incumbent
- Assumed office 28 March 2020
- Preceded by: Graeme Scheu

Personal details
- Born: Lawrence James Springborg; 17 February 1968 (age 58) Inglewood, Queensland, Australia
- Party: Liberal National
- Other political affiliations: National (1989–2008)
- Spouse: Linda Springborg
- Nickname: The Borg

Lawrence James Springborg AM (born 17 February 1968) is an Australian politician. He led the National Party in the Queensland Parliament from 2003 to 2006 and again in 2008, before becoming the first leader of the merged Liberal National Party from 2008 to 2009. He led the LNP again from 2015 to 2016 before announcing his retirement. He currently serves as Mayor of Goondiwindi Regional Council, having been elected in March 2020.

As Leader of the Queensland branch of the National Party, he led the National-Liberal coalition to defeats at both the 2004 and 2006 Queensland elections. He resigned as leader after his second election defeat, and was replaced by his former deputy, Jeff Seeney. However, after only 16 months as leader and facing poor opinion polling against Seeney, Springborg replaced him.

Following this defeat, Springborg played a leading role in the creation of the Liberal National Party (LNP), becoming the party's first leader but resigning after he led it to defeat at the 2009 Queensland election. John-Paul Langbroek was elected as his successor, with Springborg elected as Deputy Leader. Following a move by the LNP organisation to install Brisbane Lord Mayor Campbell Newman as leader of the state Party from outside of Parliament, both Langbroek and Springborg lost their positions to Newman and Jeff Seeney, respectively. The Newman-led LNP overwhelmingly won the 2012 election and Springborg became Minister for Health in the Newman Cabinet. After the 2015 election, Newman lost his electorate of Ashgrove and Springborg was once again elected leader of the LNP, with Langbroek serving as his deputy as the LNP returned to opposition after one term in office. On 6 May 2016, Springborg lost the leadership of the LNP to Tim Nicholls.

From July 2021 to August 2025, Springborg served as the LNP's president.

== Early life ==
Born in 1968, Springborg resided in the town Yelarbon for much of his younger life. He left school at the age of 14 and went on to work a farm on Queensland's Darling Downs for seven years before he was elected to Parliament in 1989 at the age of 21.

== Parliamentary career ==
In the 1989 Queensland state election, Springborg became the youngest person elected to the Parliament of Queensland, winning the safe Nationals seat of Carnarvon on the Darling Downs. In the same year, the 32-year reign of the Nationals at the state level drew to a close. Springborg represented a new generation of Nationals not associated with the era of long-serving former premier Joh Bjelke-Petersen and the allegations of corruption and maladministration arising from the Fitzgerald Inquiry. Subsequent redistributions forced Springborg to relocate to his later seat in Southern Downs.

The Nationals remained in opposition until 1996, when the Goss Labor government lost office following the 1995 state election and a consequential adverse finding in the Queensland Court of Disputed Returns and subsequent by-election loss of the seat of Mundingburra by Labor led the resignation of the then Premier Wayne Goss. The reformed National-Liberal coalition took power under Rob Borbidge but only with the support of independent MLA Liz Cunningham. In 1998, shortly before the Borbidge government lost office, Springborg was sworn in as Minister for Natural Resources, again setting a record as Queensland's youngest ever minister. In February 1999, he was as elected Deputy National Leader.

The 2001 state elections saw a massive win for the Labor Party, with Premier Peter Beattie going from a one-seat to twenty-two seat majority, and the Nationals reduced to 12 seats out of the 89-seat Parliament. After the election loss, the Coalition with the Liberals was ended and Springborg was re-elected Deputy Opposition Leader.

Borbidge subsequently resigned as Leader of the Nationals and his place was taken by Mike Horan, father of international Rugby Union player Tim Horan. After widespread speculation and criticism, the Nationals elected Springborg as leader in 2003.

== 2004 election ==
The campaign for the 2004 state election relied heavily on Springborg's personal profile. He literally ran for much of the campaign, appearing to be jogging through state forests on electoral advertising, emphasising his physical fitness. The Nationals marketed Springborg merchandise extensively, including life-size cardboard cutouts. In a move unthinkable for Nationals of an earlier era, he appeared in a Courier-Mail photograph clad only in a towel and ironing his own shirt.

== 2006 election ==
As water management became an increasingly important issue during the drought, Springborg criticised Labor's handling of the water issue. Amid speculation that the 2006 state election would be called early, the Liberal Party deposed Quinn and elected Bruce Flegg as leader in his place, who has in the past had a poor relationship with Springborg. Springborg pressed Beattie to serve a full term and not call an election before one was due. On 15 August 2006, Beattie called an election for 9 September of that year. Springborg again conceded defeat at 8 pm on 9 September 2006.

In the wake of his second election defeat, he announced his resignation as leader of the National Party on 14 September 2006. His former deputy, Jeff Seeney, ascended to the leadership position uncontested on 18 September 2006, alongside Maroochydore representative Fiona Simpson as Deputy Leader.

== Political comeback and Conservative merger ==
After deputy Fiona Simpson withdrew her support for current leader Jeff Seeney, he announced a party room challenge to take place on 21 January 2008, with former leader Springborg the front runner. Springborg won the challenge and like his rolling of Mike Horan in 2003, Springborg's rolling of Seeney meant that Springborg once again ousted a leader prior to this leader being given a chance to lead his party into an election.

After resuming the leadership, he began renewed talks of a merger to form a single 'non-Labor force' in Queensland. On 26 July 2008 this became reality when both parties voted to form the Liberal National Party of Queensland.

The failure of the two conservative parties to sign a new Coalition agreement convinced Springborg of the need to merge the Liberals and Nationals at a state level. Presenting a proposal modelled on the Conservative Party of Canada, Springborg went about campaigning through 2004 for the support of both state party organisations in creating a new unified party.

Prior to the 2006 state election, Springborg's proposal ran into early hurdles when John Howard, John Anderson, and other federal Coalition identities dismissed the idea of a state-level merger. Bob Quinn and the state Liberals reacted cautiously, ultimately rebuffing Springborg's efforts. However, Springborg did attract strong support for the idea from the National Party at a state organisational level, with the central executive supporting his proposal in February 2005. Springborg toned down some of his advocacy, however, and was content to announce a renewal of the Coalition agreement with the Liberals on 26 September 2005, aiming to maximise Labor's trouble regarding the scandal instigated by Dr Jayant Patel and the Bundaberg public hospital.

On 29 May 2006, plans for merger received a new life when the state division of the Liberal party announced its in-principle support for the idea. State director Graeme Greene stated that the merged party "would effectively operate under the federal Liberal Party's model".

However, senior figures within both the National and Liberal parties, particularly federal Nationals leader Mark Vaile, quickly spoke out against the proposed merger. By the end of the week, Springborg had to rescind his proposal.

On 26 July 2008, his vision of a united non-Labor force in Queensland finally became reality when both parties voted to form the Liberal National Party of Queensland. He has been described as the "father of the party" by successor, John-Paul Langbroek.

== 2009 election ==
Springborg led the LNP into the 2009 Queensland election; despite opinion polls predicting a close contest, the ALP led by Anna Bligh retained government. A 20-seat swing to the LNP would have been required to deliver majority government. Springborg led the LNP to an eight percent swing and took 10 seats from Labor, the largest swing to the conservatives in over 14 years. However, the LNP came up 11 seats short of making Springborg premier, largely due to winning only six seats in Brisbane. Following his third electoral defeat, Springborg announced his retirement as party leader and instead was elected deputy leader under John-Paul Langbroek.

Springborg, along with the entire Liberal National Party, supported changes to Queensland's abortion laws. Springborg resigned as deputy leader on 22 March 2011, after Brisbane Lord Mayor Campbell Newman announced he was launching a challenge for the LNP leadership.

== 2015 election ==
The LNP won the biggest majority government in Queensland history at the 2012 election, only to lose it after one term at the 2015 election. Newman lost his own seat, and Springborg was elected LNP leader for the second time. He briefly harboured hope of becoming premier in a minority government, but this was brought undone when independent Peter Wellington threw his support to Labor. Springborg thus became leader of the opposition for the third time.

=== Loss of leadership ===
Springborg lost the leadership to Tim Nicholls on 6 May 2016 in a leadership spill, by 22 votes to 19. On 3 December 2016, he announced his retirement from politics at the next Queensland state election.

Months before losing the leadership, there was speculation that Springborg would make a switch to federal politics and therefore resign the leadership by seeking preselection for the safe National seat of Maranoa following incumbent and deputy speaker Bruce Scott's announcement that he would be retiring at the next election due in 2016 but Springborg ruled this out.

== Local politics ==
In November 2019, he announced he would be standing as a candidate for mayor of Goondiwindi Regional Council in the March 2020 election. He was elected unopposed.

== See also ==
- Springborg shadow ministry

Political offices
| Preceded by Mike Horan | Leader of the Opposition in Queensland; 2003–2006 | Succeeded by Jeff Seeney |
| Preceded by Jeff Seeney | Leader of the Opposition in Queensland; 2008–2009 | Succeeded by John-Paul Langbroek |
| Preceded by Mark McArdle | Deputy Leader of the Opposition in Queensland; 2009–2011 | Succeeded by Tim Nicholls |
| Preceded by Annastacia Palaszczuk | Leader of the Opposition in Queensland; 2015–2016 | Succeeded by Tim Nicholls |
| Preceded by Howard Hobbs | Minister for Natural Resources; 1998 | Succeeded by Rod Welford |
| Preceded by Geoff Wilson | Minister for Health; 2012–2015 | Succeeded by Cameron Dick |
Parliament of Queensland
| Preceded by Peter McKechnie | Member for Carnarvon; 1989–1992 | Seat abolished |
| Preceded by Des Booth | Member for Warwick; 1992–2001 | Seat abolished |
| New seat | Member for Southern Downs; 2001–2017 | Succeeded by James Lister |
Party political offices
| Preceded by Mike Horan | Leader of the National Party in Queensland; 2003–2006 | Succeeded by Jeff Seeney |
| Preceded by Jeff Seeney | Leader of the National Party in Queensland; 2008 | Party amalgamated |
| New political party | Leader of the Liberal National Party in Queensland; 2008–2009 | Succeeded by John-Paul Langbroek |
| Preceded by Mark McArdle | Deputy Leader of the Liberal National Party in Queensland; 2009–2011 | Succeeded by Jeff Seeney |
| Preceded by Campbell Newman | Leader of the Liberal National Party in Queensland; 2015–2016 | Succeeded by Tim Nicholls |
