= Tim Nicholls =

Australian politician (born 1965)

The Honourable Tim Nicholls MP
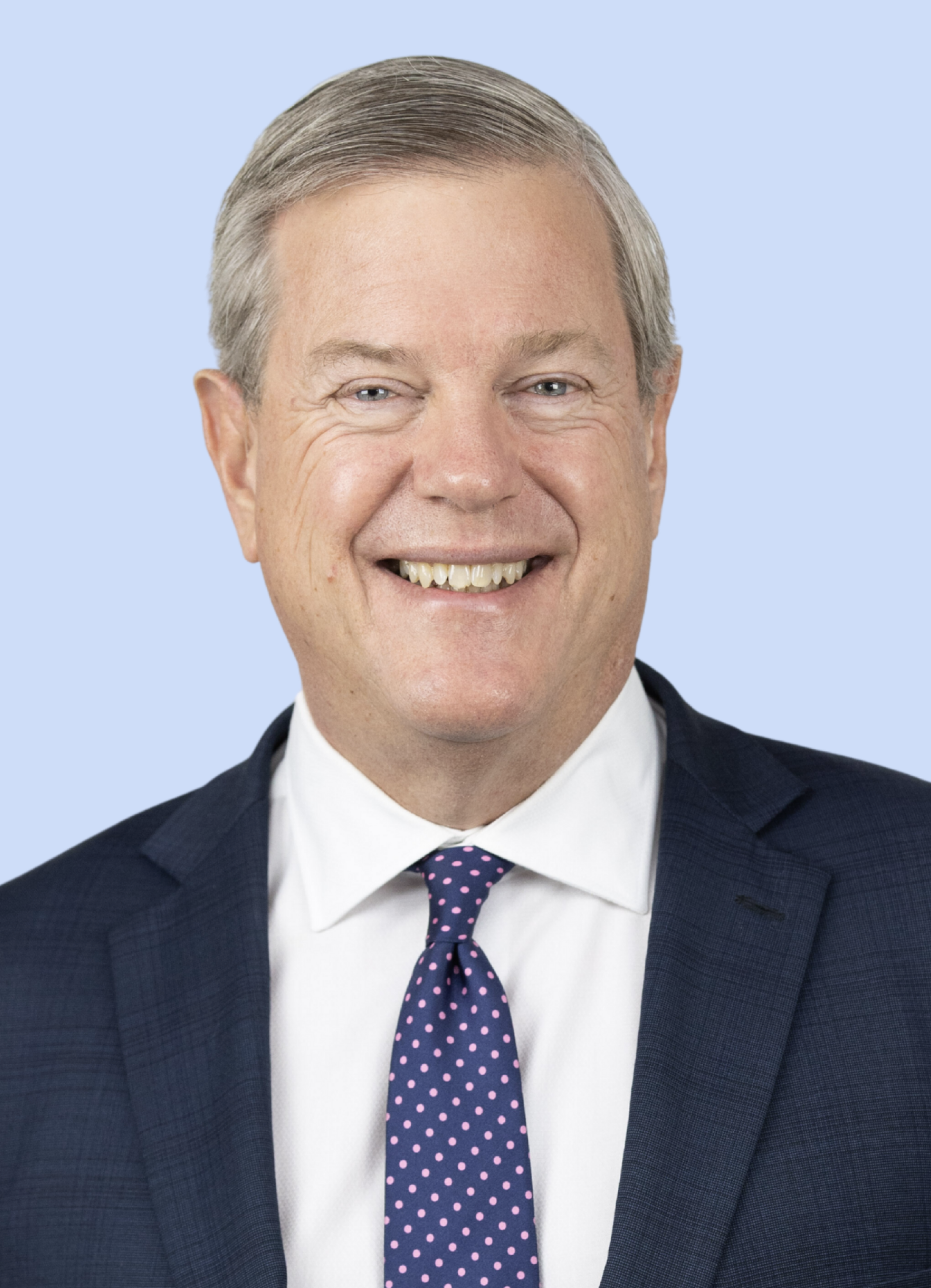
- Nicholls in 2023

Leader of the Opposition in Queensland Elections: 2017
- In office 6 May 2016 – 12 December 2017
- Premier: Annastacia Palaszczuk
- Deputy: Deb Frecklington
- Preceded by: Lawrence Springborg
- Succeeded by: Deb Frecklington

Leader of the Liberal National Party
- In office 6 May 2016 – 12 December 2017
- Deputy: Deb Frecklington
- Preceded by: Lawrence Springborg
- Succeeded by: Deb Frecklington

Deputy Leader of the Liberal Party in Queensland
- In office 6 December 2007 – 27 July 2008
- Leader: Mark McArdle
- Preceded by: Mark McArdle
- Succeeded by: Position abolished
Cabinet posts
Minister for Health and Ambulance Services
Incumbent
Assumed office 1 November 2024
Premier	David Crisafulli
Preceded by	Shannon Fentiman
Minister for Trade in Queensland
In office 3 April 2012 – 14 February 2015
Premier	Campbell Newman
Preceded by	Andrew Fraser
Succeeded by	Jackie Trad
Treasurer of Queensland
In office 26 March 2012 – 14 February 2015
Premier	Campbell Newman
Preceded by	Andrew Fraser
Succeeded by	Curtis Pitt
Other shadow cabinet posts
Shadow Attorney-General Shadow Minister for Justice
In office 16 November 2020 – 28 October 2024
Leader	David Crisafulli
Preceded by	David Janetzki
Succeeded by	Meaghan Scanlon
Shadow Minister for Arts and Major Events
In office 6 May 2016 – 15 December 2017
Leader	Himself
Preceded by	Jann Stuckey (Major Events); Ian Walker (Arts)
Succeeded by	Christian Rowan
Shadow Minister for Infrastructure, Planning, Small Business, Employment and Trade
In office 14 February 2015 – 6 May 2016
Leader	Lawrence Springborg
Preceded by	Tim Mulherin
Succeeded by	Deb Frecklington (Infrastructure and Trade); Jarrod Bleijie (Employment); Scott Emerson (Small Business); Ian Walker (Planning)
Deputy Leader of the Opposition in Queensland
In office 23 March 2011 – 24 March 2012
Leader	Jeff Seeney
Preceded by	Lawrence Springborg
Succeeded by	Tim Mulherin
Shadow Treasurer of Queensland
In office 12 August 2008 – 24 March 2012
Leader	Lawrence Springborg; John-Paul Langbroek; Campbell Newman
Preceded by	Bruce Flegg
Succeeded by	Curtis Pitt
Shadow Minister for Transport
In office 17 September 2007 – 12 August 2008
Leader	Jeff Seeney; Lawrence Springborg
Preceded by	Vaughan Johnson
Succeeded by	Fiona Simpson
Electorate
Member of the Queensland Legislative Assembly for Clayfield
Incumbent
Assumed office 9 September 2006
Preceded by	Liddy Clark
Local government politics
Member of the Brisbane City Council
In office 2000–2006
Constituency	Hamilton Ward

Personal details
- Born: Timothy James Nicholls; 6 April 1965 (age 61) Melbourne, Victoria, Australia
- Party: Liberal National (since 2008)
- Other political affiliations: Liberal (until 2008)
- Education: Trinity Grammar School; Church of England Grammar School
- Alma mater: Queensland University of Technology (LLB)
- Profession: Solicitor

Timothy James Nicholls (born 6 April 1965) is an Australian politician who served as Leader of the Liberal National Party of Queensland (LNP) and Leader of the Opposition in Queensland from 2016 to 2017. He previously served as Treasurer of Queensland and Minister for Trade between March/April 2012 and February 2015 under Premier Campbell Newman. Nicholls has been the member for Clayfield in the Legislative Assembly of Queensland since 2006 and Minister for Health and Ambulance Services in the Crisafulli ministry since 2024.

He was originally a member of the Liberal Party, including a stint as its deputy leader (2007–2008), but joined the LNP in 2008 when the Liberal Party and the National Party merged in Queensland.

== Education ==
Nicholls was educated at Trinity Grammar School in Melbourne and the Anglican Church Grammar School in Brisbane.

He completed a Bachelor of Laws at Queensland University of Technology.

== Political career ==
Originally a solicitor, Nicholls began his political career as a councillor in the Hamilton ward of the Brisbane City Council, which he held for six years. In 2006, he ran as the Liberal candidate in Clayfield, and defeated incumbent member Liddy Clark, achieving a swing of 3.2 points.

Shortly after being elected to State Parliament, Nicholls was encouraged by party colleagues to stand against Bruce Flegg for the Liberal Party leadership. Initially, he did not have enough support in the eight-member Liberal caucus.

Shortly after the federal election of 2007, Nicholls again stood against Flegg for leadership. Eventually Mark McArdle was offered as a neutral party and he accepted leadership with Nicholls as his deputy.

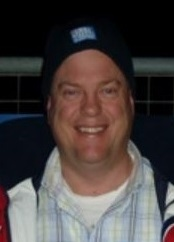
Nicholls in 2011

The leadership dispute was rendered virtually moot when the Queensland Liberal Party and Queensland National Party merged less than a year later to form the Liberal National Party. Nicholls was appointed Shadow Treasurer by Lawrence Springborg and continued to hold that position in John-Paul Langbroek's Shadow Ministry.

When Campbell Newman stood for the leadership of the party in April 2011, Nicholls supported him and was named interim Deputy Leader of the Opposition. Newman retained Nicholls as Shadow Treasurer. After the LNP won the largest majority government in Queensland history at the 2012 state election, Newman named Nicholls as his Treasurer, and he was sworn in on 26 March.

As Treasurer, Nicholls played a prominent role in the Newman government's unsuccessful campaign to privatise a range of state assets.

=== Leader of the LNP (2016–2017) ===
Following the state election in 2015 which saw the LNP lose government and several difficult months in parliament, Nicholls challenged Lawrence Springborg for the leadership of the party on 6 May 2016, winning the ballot 22 votes to 19. He was the third person from the Liberal side of the merger to hold the post. After the party suffered a three-seat swing at the 2017 state election, Nicholls announced he would stand down as leader of the party.

==== Minister for Health and Ambulance Services (2024–present) ====
Nicholls secured a record $33.1 billion for Health and Ambulance Services when the Crisafulli ministry handed down its first State Budget in June 2025. A total $18.5 billion of that investment was slotted for the State Government’s Hospital Rescue Plan, which promises to build three new hospitals and expand 10 others across Queensland.

The Hospital Rescue Plan was release off the back of an independent review into the former Queensland Labor Government’s Capacity Expansion Program, which experienced project delays and cost overruns.

The Crisafulli ministry has made much of its election promise to drive down ambulance ramping times and reduce the elective surgery waitlist. As of March 2026, Queensland Health Performance Data showed improvements for both metrics.

In January 2025, shortly after assuming office, Nicholls announced an immediate pause on the prescription of puberty blockers (Stage 1 treatment) and cross-sex hormones (Stage 2 treatment) for new patients under 18 with gender dysphoria in Queensland's public health services, pending an independent review of evidence and best practices. The directive, issued by Queensland Health Director-General David Rosengren, exempted existing patients and allowed non-pharmacological support such as counselling, citing "contested evidence" on benefits and risks, including reports of treatments provided to children as young as 12 without adequate oversight.

The policy, the first such ban in an Australian state, faced legal challenge from a parent of a transgender teenager, who argued it was procedurally flawed and politically motivated. On 27 October 2025, the Queensland Supreme Court ruled the directive unlawful, finding Rosengren had failed to conduct required consultations with Hospital and Health Service executives (limited to a 22-minute Microsoft Teams meeting concurrent with Nicholls's media announcement) under the Hospital and Health Boards Act 2011. Justice Peter Callaghan set aside the order, describing it as an improper exercise of power, though he did not rule on its substantive merits.

Hours later, on 28 October 2025, Nicholls exercised his ministerial discretion under section 44 of the Act to issue a new directive reinstating the restrictions in substantially the same terms, applying immediately to all public Hospital and Health Services. It mandates multidisciplinary panel approval for any exceptions and prioritises psychological interventions, pending the review's completion (expected November 2025) and a further evidence assessment by January 2026. Nicholls justified the action as necessary "in the public interest" to protect children amid ongoing debates over treatment efficacy. The move has drawn criticism from medical bodies like the Australian Medical Association and LGBTQ+ advocates, who contend it undermines clinical autonomy, evidence-based care, and access for vulnerable youth, potentially exacerbating inequities by pushing families toward private services.

== See also ==
- Shadow ministry of Tim Nicholls

Political offices
Preceded by Andrew Fraser	Treasurer of Queensland; 2012–2015	Succeeded by Curtis Pitt
Preceded by Lawrence Springborg	Leader of the Opposition (Queensland); 2016–2017	Succeeded by Deb Frecklington
Parliament of Queensland
Preceded by Liddy Clark	Member for Clayfield; 2006–present	Incumbent
Party political offices
Preceded by Lawrence Springborg	Leader of the Liberal National Party of Queensland; 2016–2017	Succeeded by Deb Frecklington
