= Fiona Simpson =

Australian politician

The Honourable Fiona Simpson MP

Shadow Minister for State Development, Infrastructure and Planning
- In office 16 November 2020 – 28 October 2024
- Leader: David Crisafulli
- Preceded by: Andrew Powell
- Succeeded by: Cameron Dick

Shadow Minister for Employment and Small Business Shadow Minister for Training and Skills Development
- In office 15 December 2017 – 15 November 2020
- Leader: Deb Frecklington
- Preceded by: Jarrod Bleijie (Employment, Training and Skills Development); Scott Emerson (Small Business)
Previous positions
Shadow Minister for Aboriginal, Torres Strait Islander Partnerships and Multicultural Affairs
In office 6 May 2016 – 9 February 2017
Leader	Tim Nicholls
Preceded by	Tarnya Smith
Succeeded by	Steve Minnikin
Shadow Minister for Local Government and Main Roads, Community Recovery & Resilience
In office 14 February 2015 – 6 May 2016
Leader	Lawrence Springborg
Preceded by	Tim Mulherin
Succeeded by	Andrew Powell
Speaker of the Queensland Legislative Assembly
In office 15 May 2012 – 24 March 2015
Deputy	Michael Robinson
Preceded by	John Mickel
Succeeded by	Peter Wellington
Shadow Minister for Community Services and Housing
In office 11 April 2011 – 19 February 2012
Leader	Campbell Newman
Preceded by	Ted Malone
Succeeded by	Desley Scott (Community Services); Jo-Ann Miller (Housing)
Shadow Minister for Transport and Main Roads
In office 12 August 2008 – 11 April 2011
Leader	Lawrence Springborg; John-Paul Langbroek
Preceded by	Tim Nicholls (Transport); Howard Hobbs (Main Roads)
Succeeded by	Scott Emerson (Transport); Mark Robinson (Main Roads)
Deputy Leader of the Opposition of Queensland
In office 18 September 2006 – 25 July 2008
Leader	Jeff Seeney; Lawrence Springborg
Preceded by	Jeff Seeney
Succeeded by	Mark McArdle

Member of the Queensland Parliament for Maroochydore
- Incumbent
- Assumed office 19 September 1992
- Preceded by: New seat

Personal details
- Born: 18 April 1965 (age 61) Sea Lake, Victoria
- Party: Liberal National (2008–present)
- Other political affiliations: National (1989–2008)

Fiona Stuart Simpson (born 18 April 1965 in Sea Lake, Victoria) is an Australian politician serving as Liberal National Party (LNP) member of the Queensland Legislative Assembly, representing Maroochydore since 1992. Simpson served as Speaker of the Legislative Assembly of Queensland from 2012 to 2015 and further served as the Deputy Leader of the Queensland National Party and Deputy Leader of the Opposition from 2006 to 2008. Simpson is currently Minister for Women and Minister for Women's Economic Security Minister for Aboriginal and Torres Strait Islander Partnerships and Multiculturalism.

== Education ==
Simpson holds a Bachelor of Arts degree in Japanese, Journalism and Government and a Masters of Organisational Leadership. She also has completed the Australian Institute of Company Directors Diploma and an executive leadership course at John F Kennedy School of Government, Harvard. She was a Rotary Exchange Student to Japan, and prior to that attended Nambour State High School.

== Pre-Parliamentary career ==
Simpson was a journalist prior to entering Parliament, winning the Dalgety Excellence in Rural Journalism Award in 1989, for the State of Queensland.

== Political career ==
Fiona Simpson is the longest-serving woman in the LNP party room and following the 2015 election, one of the longest-serving Members of Parliament. When she won the newly created Sunshine Coast seat of Maroochydore in 1992, she was the youngest woman ever to be elected to Legislative Assembly.

Simpson has had shadow ministerial responsibility for Health, Transport, Main Roads, Tourism, Women, Communities, Housing and Waste Watch, in addition to having been elected Deputy Leader of the Queensland National Party (and therefore Deputy Leader of the Opposition) on 18 September 2006. While Deputy Leader, Simpson was a key player in the merger with the Queensland Liberal Party, which created the Liberal National Party of Queensland. She voluntarily stepped aside as Deputy Opposition Leader in favour of Liberal Party Leader Mark McArdle to help facilitate the merger.

Following the LNP's win at the 2012 election, Premier Campbell Newman announced she would be nominated for Speaker. She was elected the body's first female speaker on 15 May 2012.

The end of Simpson's tenure as Speaker was signaled with the LNP's defeat at the 2015 Queensland state election. She unsuccessfully contested the LNP leadership and was subsequently appointed as Shadow Minister for Local Government, Main Roads, Community Recovery and Resilience.

Fiona is currently{{when}} the Shadow Minister for Intergity in Government, State Development, Infrastructure and Planning.

== Speakership ==
Simpson was the first female Speaker of the Queensland Parliament's 150-year existence. Simpson had previously spoken of the need to be proactive in encouraging women to stand for Parliament and other positions of leadership. Following her appointment, Simpson continued to encourage women to consider leadership. As Speaker, Simpson initiated the Queensland Inspiring Women Awards, for Members of Parliament to nominate women in their electorate and these awards had bipartisan support.

As Speaker, Simpson formally entered into a Parliamentary Partnership Agreement on 25 September 2013 between the Queensland Parliament and the National Parliament of Papua New Guinea to promote shared understanding and stronger Parliaments. This partnership was in addition to the Parliamentary Twinning relationship with the Parliament of Vanuatu.

== Past Controversy ==
During a parliamentary debate in 2002 on changes to anti-discrimination laws that would prevent faith-based schools from discriminating against teachers not of their faith, including gay and lesbian teachers, Simpson referred to acquaintances who are 'former' homosexuals. Simpson also said that she had previously interviewed Sy Rogers, Sy Rogers a leader in ministering to 'former' homosexuals within the controversial ex-gay movement, specifically from Exodus International. In her speech to Parliament, Simpson contrasted what she called "some very genuinely held beliefs" that homosexuality is an unchangeable, born trait with those who believe that homosexuality is a "lifestyle choice", such that homosexuals may choose to "grow into heterosexuality over time".

Media attention was brought to these comments in 2011, and despite the comments drawing criticism from Karen Struthers, mental health psychologist Paul Martin and the gay community, neither Simpson nor the LNP have responded to questions to clarify her personal beliefs on the subject of the ex-gay movement. Fiona Simpson deleted her Facebook page following the controversy after it was inundated with criticism over her support of Exodus.

Contacted in 2015 about the 2002 comments, Simpson provided clarifying remarks, saying "I understand that there are people who have been hurt by (these comments and) their reporting and that deeply saddens me. When I made those comments in 2002 I was sharing a friend’s personal story. I believe equally that every person has the right to have their story heard and that every person is valuable and deserving of respect. I appreciate that different people will have different stories and our community is more welcoming when we listen more carefully and speak more compassionately".

Parliament of Queensland
Preceded by John Mickel	Speaker of the Legislative Assembly of Queensland; 2012–2015	Succeeded by Peter Wellington
Preceded by New seat	Member for Maroochydore; 1992–present	Incumbent
