= Electoral results for the district of Indooroopilly =

Queensland, Australia, district election results

This is a list of electoral results for the electoral district of Indooroopilly in Queensland state elections.

== Members for Indooroopilly ==
Member	Party	Term
Denver Beanland	Liberal	1992–2001
Ronan Lee	Labor	2001–2008
Ronan Lee	Greens	2008–2009
Scott Emerson	Liberal National	2009–present

== Election results ==
=== Elections in the 2010s ===
2015 Queensland state election: Indooroopilly
Party	Candidate	Votes	%	±%
Liberal National	Scott Emerson	13,502	50.98	−9.91
Labor	Christopher Horacek	7,260	27.41	+8.74
Greens	Jake Schoermer	4,933	18.63	+0.14
Independent	Anita Diamond	490	1.85	+1.85
Independent	Paul Swan	165	0.62	+0.62
Independent	Ben Freney	134	0.51	+0.51
Total formal votes		26,484	98.64	+0.03
Informal votes		364	1.36	−0.03
Turnout		26,848	88.62	−1.26
Two-party-preferred result
Liberal National	Scott Emerson	14,111	56.73	−12.82
Labor	Christopher Horacek	10,763	43.27	+12.82
Liberal National hold		Swing	−12.82	

2012 Queensland state election: Indooroopilly
Party	Candidate	Votes	%	±%
Liberal National	Scott Emerson	15,225	60.89	+14.44
Labor	Oscar Schlamowitz	4,669	18.67	−7.87
Greens	Charles Worringham	4,623	18.49	−7.44
Family First	Andrew Mooney	488	1.95	+1.95
Total formal votes		25,005	98.62	−0.34
Informal votes		351	1.38	+0.34
Turnout		25,356	89.89	−0.72
Two-party-preferred result
Liberal National	Scott Emerson	16,140	69.55	+13.68
Labor	Oscar Schlamowitz	7,067	30.45	−13.68
Liberal National hold		Swing	+13.68	

=== Elections in the 2000s ===
2009 Queensland state election: Indooroopilly
Party	Candidate	Votes	%	±%
Liberal National	Scott Emerson	11,570	44.5	+2.3
Labor	Sarah Warner	6,907	26.5	−14.4
Greens	Ronan Lee	6,749	25.9	+9.0
DS4SEQ	John Burkett	802	3.1	+3.1
Total formal votes		26,028	98.9	
Informal votes		274	1.1	
Turnout		26,302	90.6	
Two-party-preferred result
Liberal National	Scott Emerson	12,891	55.9	+8.6
Labor	Sarah Warner	10,184	44.1	−8.6
Liberal National gain from Greens		Swing	+8.6	

2006 Queensland state election: Indooroopilly
Party	Candidate	Votes	%	±%
Liberal	Peter Turner	9,868	42.4	−0.6
Labor	Ronan Lee	9,410	40.5	−0.4
Greens	Judy Petroeschevsky	3,979	17.1	+2.6
Total formal votes		23,257	98.7	−0.2
Informal votes		314	1.3	+0.2
Turnout		23,571	89.3	−0.2
Two-party-preferred result
Labor	Ronan Lee	11,684	52.4	+0.3
Liberal	Peter Turner	10,601	47.6	−0.3
Labor hold		Swing	+0.3	

2004 Queensland state election: Indooroopilly
Party	Candidate	Votes	%	±%
Liberal	Allan Pidgeon	9,888	43.0	+5.8
Labor	Ronan Lee	9,419	40.9	+2.2
Greens	Chris Head	3,334	14.5	+4.4
One Nation	John Drew	364	1.6	−2.2
Total formal votes		23,005	98.9	+0.0
Informal votes		255	1.1	−0.0
Turnout		23,260	89.5	−0.8
Two-party-preferred result
Labor	Ronan Lee	11,480	52.1	−0.8
Liberal	Allan Pidgeon	10,564	47.9	+0.8
Labor hold		Swing	−0.8	

2001 Queensland state election: Indooroopilly
Party	Candidate	Votes	%	±%
Labor	Ronan Lee	9,028	38.7	+0.8
Liberal	Denver Beanland	8,686	37.2	−7.6
Greens	Drew Hutton	2,351	10.1	+0.4
Independent	Geoffrey Sakzewski	997	4.3	+4.3
Democrats	Mary McIntyre	944	4.0	−3.6
One Nation	John Drew	879	3.8	+3.8
Independent	Nigel Freemarijuana	434	1.9	+1.9
Total formal votes		23,319	98.9	
Informal votes		260	1.1	
Turnout		23,579	90.3	
Two-party-preferred result
Labor	Ronan Lee	11,245	52.9	+3.3
Liberal	Denver Beanland	10,022	47.1	−3.3
Labor gain from Liberal		Swing	+3.3	

=== Elections in the 1990s ===
1998 Queensland state election: Indooroopilly
Party	Candidate	Votes	%	±%
Liberal	Denver Beanland	9,482	45.0	−11.1
Labor	Anne Stuart	7,908	37.6	+9.3
Greens	Drew Hutton	2,049	9.7	+0.8
Democrats	Mary McIntyre	1,618	7.7	+1.0
Total formal votes		21,057	98.7	−0.3
Informal votes		270	1.3	+0.3
Turnout		21,327	91.1	+0.8
Two-party-preferred result
Liberal	Denver Beanland	10,412	50.7	−12.6
Labor	Anne Stuart	10,137	49.3	+12.6
Liberal hold		Swing	+12.6	

1995 Queensland state election: Indooroopilly
Party	Candidate	Votes	%	±%
Liberal	Denver Beanland	11,270	56.2	−0.2
Labor	Teresa Farruggio	5,660	28.2	−15.4
Greens	Willy Bach	1,798	9.0	+9.0
Democrats	Simon Price	1,336	6.7	+6.7
Total formal votes		20,064	99.0	+1.1
Informal votes		198	1.0	−1.1
Turnout		20,262	90.3	
Two-party-preferred result
Liberal	Denver Beanland	12,418	63.3	+6.9
Labor	Teresa Farruggio	7,214	36.7	−6.9
Liberal hold		Swing	+6.9	

1992 Queensland state election: Indooroopilly
Party	Candidate	Votes	%	±%
Liberal	Denver Beanland	11,633	56.4	+13.4
Labor	Harold Thornton	8,999	43.6	−1.7
Total formal votes		20,632	97.9	
Informal votes		439	2.1	
Turnout		21,071	90.3	
Liberal hold		Swing	+4.4	
