= Electoral results for the district of Maiwar =

List of electoral results

This is a list of electoral results for the electoral district of Maiwar in Queensland state elections.

== Members for Maiwar ==
Member	Party	Term
Michael Berkman	Greens	2017–present

== Election results ==
=== Elections in the 2020s ===
2024 Queensland state election: Maiwar
Party	Candidate	Votes	%	±%
Liberal National	Natasha Winters	13,676	37.70	+0.50
Greens	Michael Berkman	12,319	33.96	−7.44
Labor	Susan Irvine	9,160	25.25	+6.75
One Nation	Grant Spork	1,119	3.09	+1.69
Total formal votes		36,274	98.22	−0.41
Informal votes		658	1.78	+0.41
Turnout		36,932	90.84	+0.39
Two-candidate-preferred result
Greens	Michael Berkman	19,382	53.43	−2.87
Liberal National	Natasha Winters	16,892	46.57	+2.87
Greens hold		Swing	−2.87	

2020 Queensland state election: Maiwar
Party	Candidate	Votes	%	±%
Greens	Michael Berkman	14,254	41.32	+13.55
Liberal National	Lauren Day	12,832	37.20	−4.70
Labor	Palani Thevar	6,413	18.59	−8.94
One Nation	Boyd Shannon	476	1.38	+1.38
Independent	Michael Johnson	348	1.01	+1.01
United Australia	Jacob Rush	170	0.49	+0.49
Total formal votes		34,493	98.63	+1.04
Informal votes		478	1.37	−1.04
Turnout		34,971	90.45	+3.64
Notional two-party-preferred count (Note: Estimate two-party preferred count by Antony Green.)
Labor	Palani Thevar		54.20	
Liberal National	Lauren Day		45.80	
Two-candidate-preferred result
Greens	Michael Berkman	19,427	56.32	+4.70
Liberal National	Lauren Day	15,066	43.68	−4.70
Greens hold		Swing	+4.70	

=== Elections in the 2010s ===
2017 Queensland state election: Maiwar
Party	Candidate	Votes	%	±%
Liberal National	Scott Emerson	13,352	41.9	−5.8
Greens	Michael Berkman	8,850	27.8	+7.4
Labor	Ali King	8,772	27.5	−1.5
Independent	Anita Diamond	888	2.8	+2.8
Total formal votes		31,862	97.6	−1.1
Informal votes		785	2.4	+1.1
Turnout		32,647	86.8	+1.1
Two-candidate-preferred result
Greens	Michael Berkman	16,449	51.6	+51.6
Liberal National	Scott Emerson	15,413	48.4	−4.6
Greens gain from Liberal National		Swing	+4.6	
