= The Mouldy Lovers =

Australian musical group

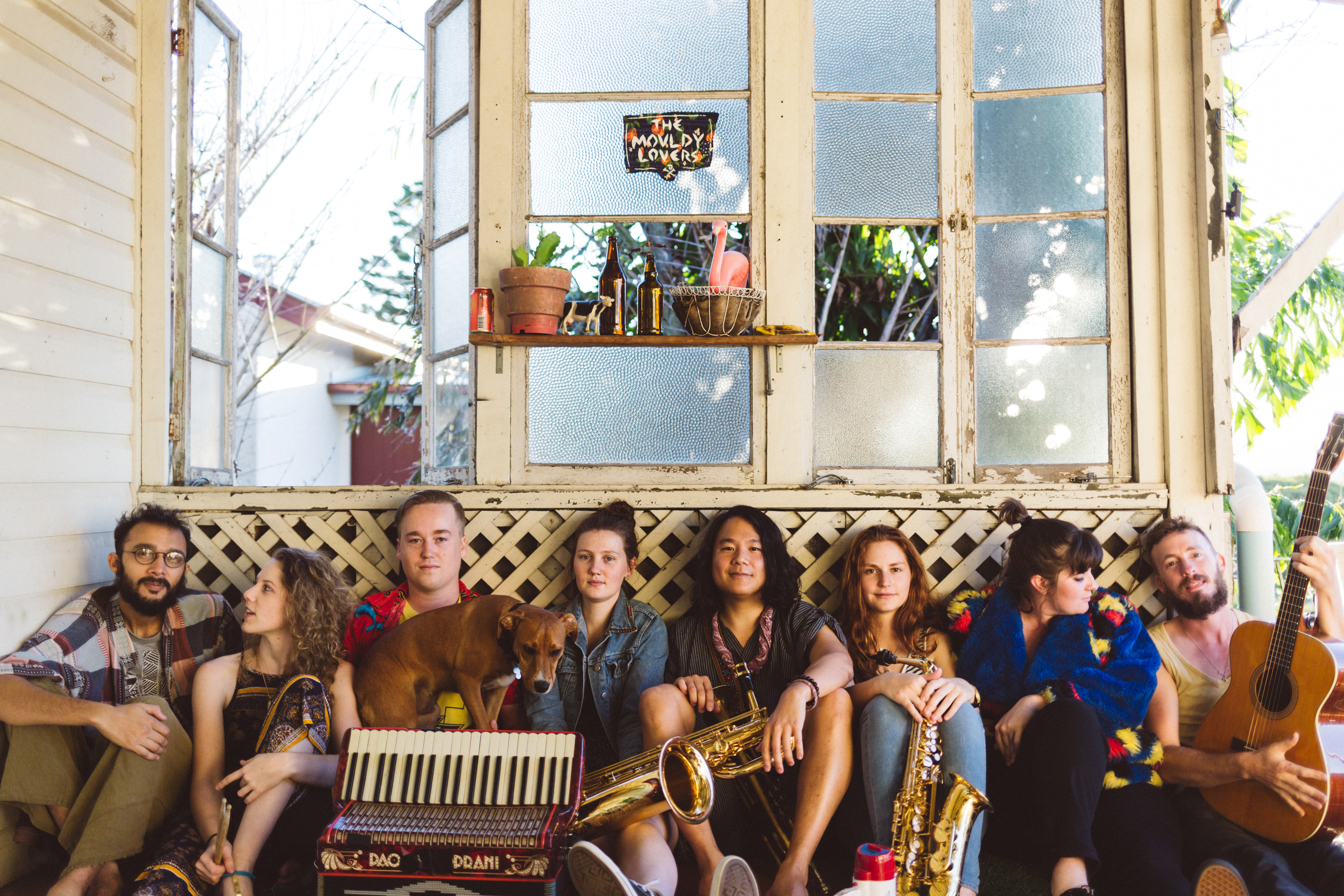
- The Mouldy Lovers, West End, May 2016. Photo by Blake Gannon.

Background information
- Origin: West End, Queensland, Australia
- Genres: Ska punk, ska, Eco-ska
- Years active: 2010–present
- Members: Matt Hsu; Louis Whelan; Caroline Townsend; Gavin Cook; Jonathan Sriranganathan; Kathryn Bermingham; Steph McIntyre
- Past members: Jade Channells; Henri Paternoster; Nicholas Downing; Jen Horn; Jessica McFadyen; Bodie Howell; Laura Kirkwood

The Mouldy Lovers are a Queensland Music Award–nominated musical group with seven members, which formed in early 2010. They perform gypsy-influenced ska music with punk, reggae, Romani music and Klezmer elements. The band came to prominence in 2011 with the release of their second extended play, Kakistocracy, and frequent performances and festival appearances in Queensland and New South Wales. Their debut album, Yonder Ruckus, was released in January 2013, receiving national Australian airplay on Triple J and charting at number one for multiple weeks on 4ZZZ.

The band exhibits gender and cultural diversity in their membership and have close ties with the Brisbane suburb of West End, often cited as 'West End favourites'. The group regularly busk and play at West End community events such as Laura Street Festival and West End Block Party and stores such as Jet Black Cat Music.

In addition to musical collaborations, The Mouldy Lovers have also worked with local street theatre and circus cabaret performers. In 2011, the group collaborated with community circus group The Ice Cream Factory to hold 'The Mouldy Lovers Fresh Flesh Cabaret', a cabaret, circus, acrobatics and music event. In the same year, collaborated with street theatre troupe The Gremlins in a performance exhibition event, and again in 2012, at Woodford Folk Festival.

The band has performed with international acts such as The Skatalites, Babylon Circus, Neville Staple, Kenta Hayashi, and Hot 8 Brass Band.

== History ==
The Mouldy Lovers began in early 2010 in the Brisbane suburb of West End as a folk trio, composed of Louis Whelan, Jade Channells, and Matt Hsu, regularly performing at markets and venues. Seeking to expand their sound, the group enlisted Jen Horn, Nicholas Downing, Henri Paternoster, and Caroline Townsend later in 2010.

Following the departure of Jade Channells and Henri Paternoster in March 2012, the group recruited Gavin Cook, guitarist and vocalist for The Vulture St Family Skiffle Band. In September 2012, Jessica McFadyen (daughter of Ian McFadyen) and Queensland Greens Councillor Jonathan Sriranganathan (then known as Sri) joined. In 2015, Brisbane musicians Kathryn Bermingham and Steph McIntyre joined the group.

Since 2011 the group has begun playing at music festivals in Queensland and New South Wales, including Caloundra Music Festival, Island Vibe Festival, and Surfing the Coldstream Festival. The group returned to many of these festivals in 2012, with the addition of Snowy Mountains of Music, 2 High Festival, Wallaby Creek Festival and Woodford Folk Festival.

In 2016 the group performed at Falls Festival. In 2017, The Mouldy Lovers were nominated for a QMusic Queensland Music Award in the world music category.

== Members ==
- Louis Whelan – piano accordion
- Matt Hsu – trumpet/clarinet/trombone
- Kathryn Bermingham – baritone saxophone
- Steph McIntyre – drum kit/alto saxophone
- Caroline Townsend – bass guitar
- Gavin Cook – guitar/vocals
- Jonathan Sriranganathan – tenor saxophone/rapping

Former members:

- Jade Channells – guitar/banjo uke
- Henri Paternoster – tenor saxophone
- Nicholas Downing – drum kit/percussion
- Jen Horn – piano/electronic organ
- Jessica McFadyen – trumpet
- Bodie Howell – trombone
- Laura Kirkwood – drum kit
