= Michael Berkman =

Australian politician

Michael Berkman MP

Member of the Queensland Legislative Assembly for Maiwar
- Incumbent
- Assumed office 25 November 2017
- Preceded by: Seat established

Personal details
- Born: 13 March 1981 (age 45) Brisbane, Queensland, Australia
- Party: Queensland Greens
- Children: 3
- Education: Toowoomba State High School
- Alma mater: Griffith University (BSc, LLB)
- Occupation: Politician, lawyer
- Website: michaelberkman.com.au

Michael Craig Berkman (born 13 March 1981) is an Australian politician and the member for Maiwar in Brisbane's inner-west. Berkman has been the member for Maiwar since the 2017 Queensland state election, when he became the first Greens member to be elected to the Legislative Assembly of Queensland. He is the first member for Maiwar, after the electorate was created from the merger of the former Indooroopilly and Mt Coot-tha electorates.

== Early life ==
Berkman was born in Brisbane, Queensland. His father worked in the media and his mother had trained as a secondary school teacher. He grew up in Toowoomba, Queensland after the family moved there when Michael was 3 years old. Berkman attended Wilsonton State School and Toowoomba State High School.

Berkman first attended the University of Queensland to commence a Bachelor of Science before moving to Griffith University, attending the Nathan campus, where he graduated in 2009 with a double degree, Bachelor of Science, Bachelor of Laws.

== Early career ==
Berkman began his legal career as a clerk with Freehills in Brisbane, and spent some time working there following his graduation. He left legal practice to work in the Queensland Government's office of climate change until this group was made redundant following the election of the Newman Government in 2012.

Berkman then accepted a position with the Environmental Defenders Office in Brisbane. In this role, he was involved in litigation with a particular specialisation in ground water in cases against Adani's Carmichael Coal Mine, the Alpha Coal Mine, and the New Acland Coal Mine Stage 3 Expansion.

Berkman has also been involved in the not-for-profit sector, having previously worked with Millen Farms.

== Political career ==
Berkman's political career began in the 2015 Queensland state election where he ran for the Greens in Ferny Grove, achieving a primary vote of 12.11%.

In 2016, Berkman ran in the local government elections for Moreton Bay Region in District 10, and then against Peter Dutton for the seat of Dickson at the 2016 federal election.

Berkman was the first Greens member to be elected to the Legislative Assembly of Queensland in the seat of Maiwar in Brisbane's inner-west. He achieved a 27.78% primary vote to defeat incumbent Scott Emerson in the 2017 Queensland state election. This followed the removal of the Indooroopilly electorate at the 2017 state election to make way for the new seat of Maiwar which had a notional LNP margin of 3%. Prior to its abolition, the Indooroopilly electorate was briefly held by a Greens MP, Ronan Lee, after he defected from the Labor in 2008 in the middle of a parliamentary term.

=== Electoral History ===
Moreton Bay Regional Council
Election year	Electorate	Party	Votes	FP%	+/-	2PP%	+/-	Result
2016	Div 4	GRN	1,787	10.38	▲10.38	N/A	N/A	Third

Australian House of Representatives
Election year	Electorate	Party	Votes	FP%	+/-	2PP%	+/-	Result
2016	Dickson	GRN	8,971	9.87	▲3.45	N/A	N/A	Third

Queensland Legislative Assembly
Election year	Electorate	Party	Votes	FP%	+/-	2PP%	+/-	Result
2015	Ferny Grove	GRN	3,589	12.11	▼2.14	N/A	N/A	Third
2017	Maiwar	GRN	8,850	27.80	▲7.40	51.60	▲51.60	First
2020	Maiwar	GRN	14,254	41.32	▲13.55	56.32	▲4.70	First
2024	Maiwar	GRN	13,676	37.70	▼7.44	53.43	▼2.87	First

== Political positions ==
=== Political donations ===
In 2018, Berkman introduced a private member's bill to ban all political donations from businesses to state and local government politicians, candidates and parties, excluding charities and employee or employer organisations. Berkman said the community overwhelmingly supported reform to get big money out of politics. "People feel like Labor and the LNP are just not listening to them, and it's not hard to see why," Berkman said. "This is just more evidence that Labor and the LNP are completely wedded to their corporate donors." The Crime and Corruption Commission did not support the bill; however, Commissioner Alan MacSporran said it was his personal view that in an ideal world all donations would be banned.

=== Climate rally ===
In November 2018, Berkman said schools in Maiwar, Berkman's electorate, should allow students to attend climate change events during school hours. According to Berkman, all school principals agreed. The flagship rally took place on 30 November. Over 400 students attended, demanding climate action from the Australian Government and Queensland Government.

=== Human rights and penal system ===
In 2018, Berkman called for investigations into Facebook comments from prison officers which advocated for extrajudicial violence against detainees. In 2021, he proposed a bill that would raise the age of the age of criminal responsibility, which was defeated by four votes in 2022.

Berkman has opposed youth crime bills that would override the Human Rights Act and make breach of bail by juvenile offenders a criminal offence. In March 2023, during the debate on the youth crime bill, he tabled claims of human rights abuses that had allegedly occurred at the Brisbane Watch House.

== Personal life ==
Berkman is married with three children and he lives in Toowong.

Parliament of Queensland
New seat	Member for Maiwar; 2017–present	Incumbent
