= The Federation of Indian Communities of Queensland Inc =

The Federation of Indian Communities of Queensland Inc. (FICQ) was founded in 1998. It acts as a nonprofit umbrella body for organisations representing those with Indian heritage living in Queensland, Australia. As of March 2023, FICQ consisted of 33 organisations.

FICQ assists with the organization of the annual Diwali or Deepavali (Festival of Lights) in Brisbane's King George Square. This festival is supported by the Queensland Government and the Brisbane City Council.

FICQ Presidents include Dr Preethi Suraj (2024–current), Anoop Nannuru (2022–2023), Shyam Das (2020–2022), Dr Ram Mohan (2018–2019) and Palani O. Thevar, Social Worker, Lecturer - AIPC, Justice of the Peace|J.P. (2016–2017).

Palani Thevar contested the state electorate of Maiwar as a candidate for the Australian Labor Party in the 2020 Queensland election.

== Members Associations of FICQ ==
- http://www.hcindia-au.org/indian-association-in-queensland.htm
- http://tamilbrisbane.org.au
- http://qldteluguassociation.org/index.php
- http://tamilqld.org
- https://basavasamithibrisbane.org
- http://www.bsqonline.net.au
- https://brimm.org.au
- http://brisbanetelangana.org.au
- http://daminiwomens.com.au
- https://www.gaq.org.au/
