= Tamil Australians =

Australians with a Tamil heritage

Total population
- 150,000 (2023)

Regions with significant populations
- State / Territory
- New South Wales: 21,527
- Victoria: 17,452
- Western Australia: 4,078
- Queensland: 3,475
- South Australia: 1,703
- Australian Capital Territory: 1,416
- Northern Territory: 280
- Tasmania: 216

Languages
- Tamil; English

Religion
- Hinduism; Christianity; Islam; Jainism

Related ethnic groups
- Sri Lankan Tamils; Indian Tamils; Tamil Malaysians; Singapore Tamils

Tamil Australians refers to Australians with a Tamil background. It includes people who speak Tamil, those whose ancestors were Tamil or those who identify with Tamil culture. Most Tamil Australians are of Indian, Sri Lankan, Singaporean or Malaysian descent.

== Demographics ==
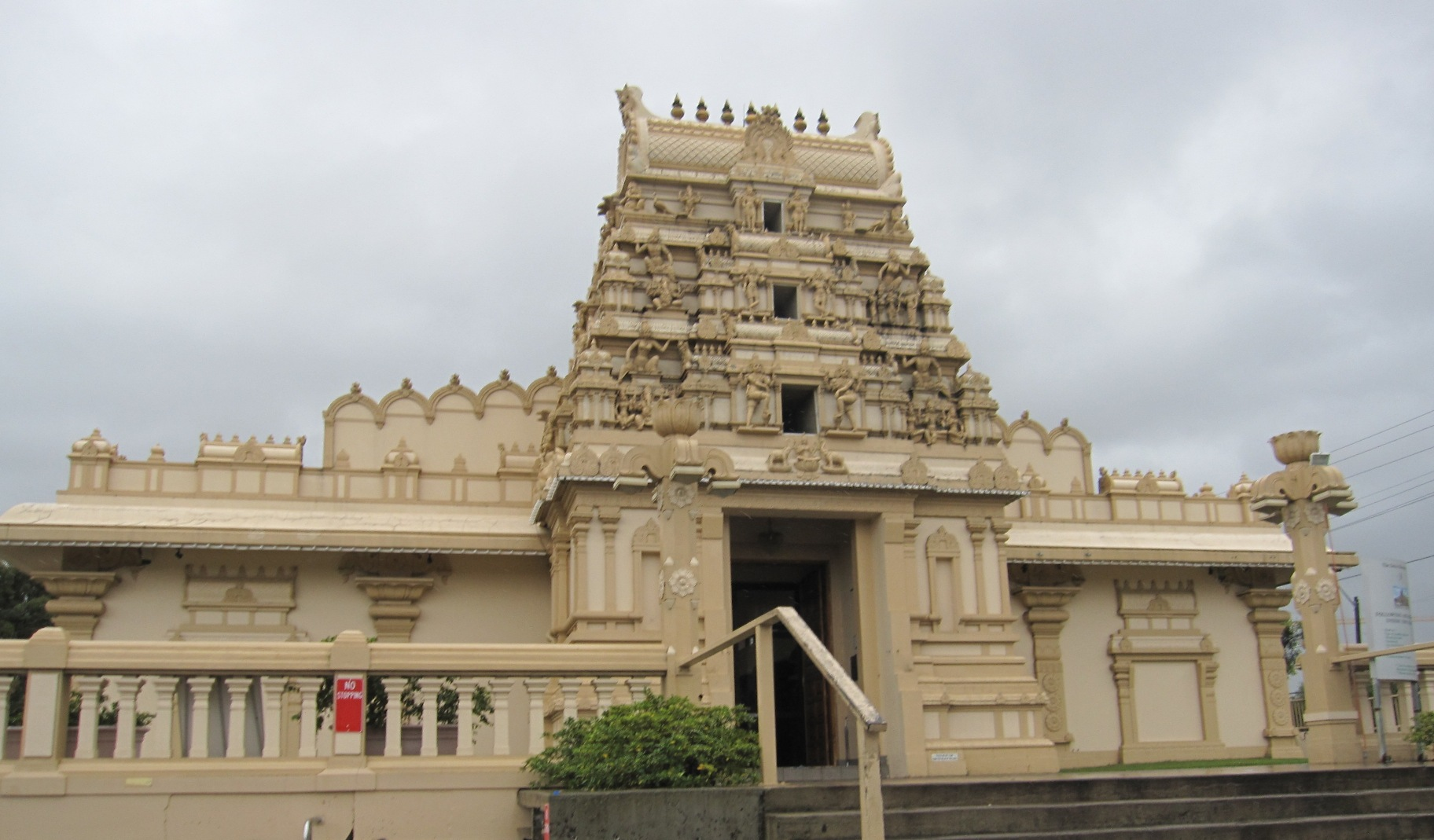
Murugan Temple, Sydney

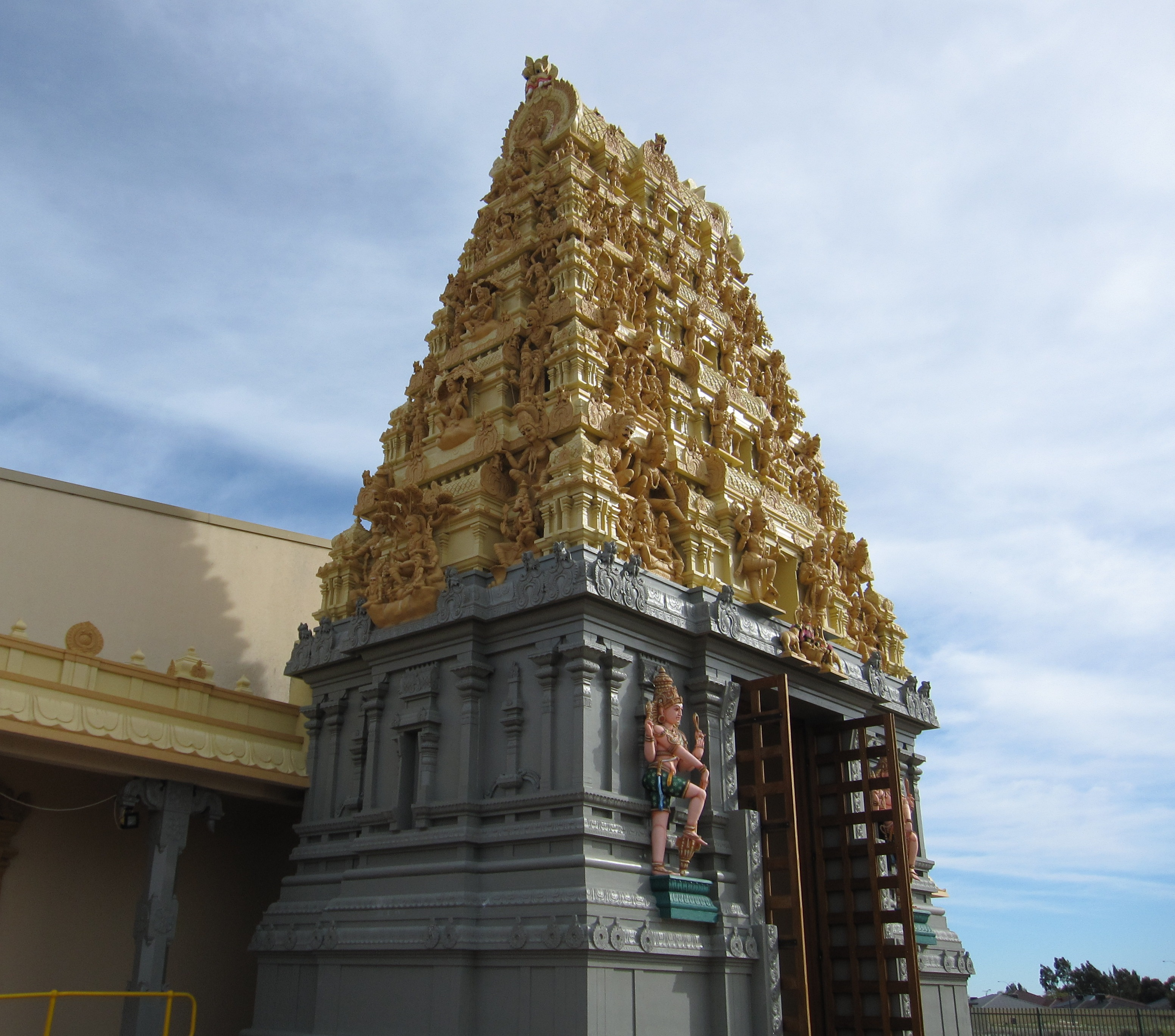
Saivaite Temple, Perth

The Census 2021 has found 95,404 people speaking Tamil at home. The total number of ethnic Tamils could be around 150,000 people well above the census data considering the possibility of refugee statuses being getting considered as Migrants as per refugee policy reform. This is the first time Indian Tamils have taken over as the majority over the Sri Lankan Tamils in a foreign country other than the United States. There are no exact figures for the number of Tamil Australians but according to the 2011 census there were 50,151 Australians, 0.23% of the population, who spoke Tamil at home. Tamil speaking Australians are of Indian, Sri Lankan, Singaporean and Malaysian ancestry. The Census 2016 shows an increase of 50% in Tamil population who speak Tamil at home.

There were 73,161 Tamil speakers according to the 2016 Census, with the largest proportion of people across Australia in the suburb of Westmead (1,425 people, or 3.6% of people in that suburb), followed by Toongabbie (NSW) (1,404 people, or 3.5% of people in that suburb).

Analysis of 2011 census by language and ancestry highlighting Tamil characteristics
Ancestry	Language (first ancestry)						Language (second ancestry)					
Ancestry	Tamil	English	Sinhala	Not stated	Other	Total	Tamil	English	Sinhala	Not stated	Other	Total
Tamil	11,407	1,057	85	58	149	12,756	650	257	16	13	48	984
Indian Tamil	406	50	4	3	15	478	21	12	0	0	−1	32
Sri Lankan Tamil	4,153	702	102	27	41	5,025	62	83	6	0	8	159
Sub-total Tamil	15,966	1,809	191	88	205	18,259	733	352	22	13	55	1,175
Indian	20,923	77,033	64	3,204	249,641	350,865	540	31,992	38	217	7,246	40,033
Sri Lankan	8,534	23,792	27,862	442	1,551	62,181	300	11,541	679	47	389	12,956
Australian	748	4,777,283	684	24,942	118,275	4,921,932	82	2,135,198	50	6,458	34,761	2,176,549
Sinhalese	942	2,351	16,898	115	225	20,531	76	901	1,372	13	54	2,416
English	862	7,062,120	809	33,676	125,990	7,223,457	7	13,136	8	107	1,821	15,079
Malay	502	6,973	17	134	13,230	20,856	91	9,015	32	56	3,568	12,762
Singaporean	178	1,930	0	123	1,302	3,533	25	2,083	0	13	498	2,619
Not stated	856	391,451	913	979,843	102,167	1,475,230	47,984	10,434,941	45,710	1,060,759	3,465,645	15,055,039
Other	640	4,164,549	754	42,924	3,202,008	7,410,875	313	3,870,132	281	17,808	300,557	4,189,091
Total	50,151	16,509,291	48,192	1,085,491	3,814,594	21,507,719	50,151	16,509,291	48,192	1,085,491	3,814,594	21,507,719

Tamil speakers as a proportion of the local population in Sydney according to the 2011 Census.

As per the 2011 census, over 39.59% of Tamil speaking Australians were born in Sri Lanka, 34.89% in India and 13.05% in Australia.

Country	Population	%
Sri Lanka	19,855	39.59%
India	17,500	34.89%
Australia	6,547	13.05%
Malaysia	2,782	5.55%
Singapore	1,687	3.36%
Not stated	445	0.89%
Other	1,335	2.66%
Total	50,151	100.00%

They live concentrated in Wentworthville, Pendle Hill, Girraween, Toongabbie and Strathfield in Sydney and in Glen Waverley and Dandenong North in Melbourne.

State suburb	State	Tamils	% of suburb	% of Tamils
Wentworthville	NSW	1,073	10.13%	2.14%
Glen Waverley	VIC	945	2.41%	1.88%
Dandenong	VIC	935	3.75%	1.86%
Westmead	NSW	908	6.41%	1.81%
Toongabbie	NSW	853	6.56%	1.70%
Pendle Hill	NSW	849	12.74%	1.69%
Strathfield	NSW	815	3.45%	1.63%
Girraween	NSW	1290	20.6%	1.52%
Auburn	NSW	659	1.99%	1.31%
Lidcombe	NSW	658	3.95%	1.31%
Seven Hills	NSW	650	3.45%	1.30%
Homebush	NSW	588	9.49%	1.17%
Dandenong North	VIC	531	2.42%	1.06%

More than 80% have completed high school education; the rate is only 50% for the general Australian population. More than 59% own their houses, compared with more than 67% of the general population.

== Tamil Australians ==
- Nishan Velupillay, footballer
- Christie Jayaratnam Eliezer, emeritus professor
- Geraldine Viswanathan, actress
- Nazeem Hussain, comedian
- Clarence Jey, record producer
- Suresh Joachim, multiple Guinness World Record holder
- Kamahl, singer
- Kumar Mahadevan, Michelin star chef
- Samantha Ratnam, Politician, social worker, current leader of the Victorian Greens
- Duvashen Padayachee, race car driver
- Guy Sebastian, singer and winner of the first season of Australian Idol; of partial Malaysian Tamil descent
- Prashanth Sellathurai, gymnast
- Maha Sinnathamby, entrepreneur
- Renuga Veeran, badminton player
- Jonathan Sriranganathan, Councillor for The Gabba Ward in the Brisbane City Council
- Ecca Vandal, Singer-songwriter
- Vimala Raman, actress
- Dhee, Singer
- Nivethan Radhakrishnan, Cricketer
- Jega Nadarajah, 2000 Olympic Torchbearer
