= Matt Hsu's Obscure Orchestra =

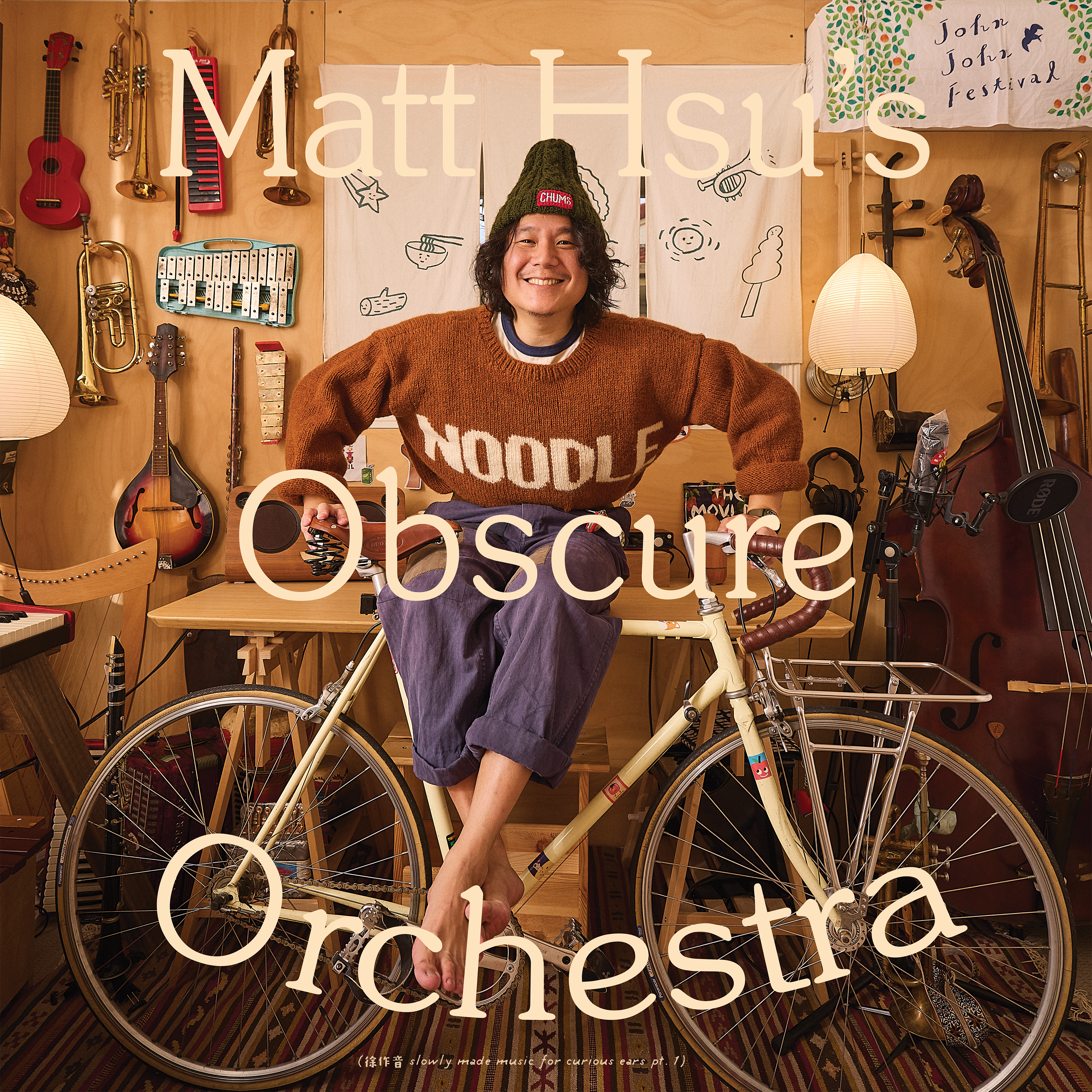
- Matt Hsu's Obscure Orchestra photographed by Rod Pilbeam, 2024.

Background information
- Born: Matt Hsu; Brisbane, Queensland, Australia
- Genres: Experimental music, art pop, bedroom pop, Political hip hop
- Occupations: Composer, songwriter, multi-instrumentalist
- Instruments: Trumpet, clarinet, accordion, double bass, mbira, trombone, marimba, vibraphone, percussion
- Website: obscureorchestra.com

Matt Hsu is a Taiwanese-Australian musician and composer. In 2016 he began creating music as a multi-instrumentalist under the moniker Matt Hsu's Obscure Orchestra, which in 2020, also became a live ensemble consisting of Brisbane indie musicians, hip-hop artists, classically trained musicians, and multi-disciplinary artists.

== Early life and education ==
Matt Hsu was born to immigrant Taiwanese parents in Brisbane.

As a child he listened to metal and punk music, in an effort to distance himself from Asian stereotypes, but later embraced his Taiwanese heritage, using music to express overcoming internalised racism. When he was 15, he played in a metal band, rapping covers of Rage Against the Machine.

== Career ==
Hsu is known as the co-founder, trumpet player and songwriter for the folk punk band The Mouldy Lovers.

In 2016, Hsu began composing as "Matt Hsu's Obscure Orchestra", initially as a solo project.

His 2019 debut album The Shirt Album is notable for having been released "in the form of an organic fair-trade T-shirt in place of a CD" with the aim of reducing potential plastic waste. The album features collaborations with noted Tibetan musician Tenzin Choegyal, Triple J Unearthed Sprung Hip Hop winner Blaq Carrie, and Japanese musician Kenta Hayashi,

As a "one-person orchestra" he has performed at TEDx and Australia's BIGSOUND Festival, and has been featured on SBS World News, and ABC's Art Works.

== Awards ==
=== Queensland Music Awards ===
In 2020, Hsu became a Queensland Music Awards winner in the world music category

The Queensland Music Awards (previously known as Q Song Awards) are annual awards celebrating Queensland, Australia's brightest emerging artists and established legends. They commenced in 2006.

Year	Nominee / work	Award	Result (wins only)	Ref.
2020	"Make Everything"	World Award of the Year	Won	
2022	"Welcome to the Neighbourhood" (Taiwanese: 就當家裡)	World Award of the Year	Won	

== Live ensemble ==
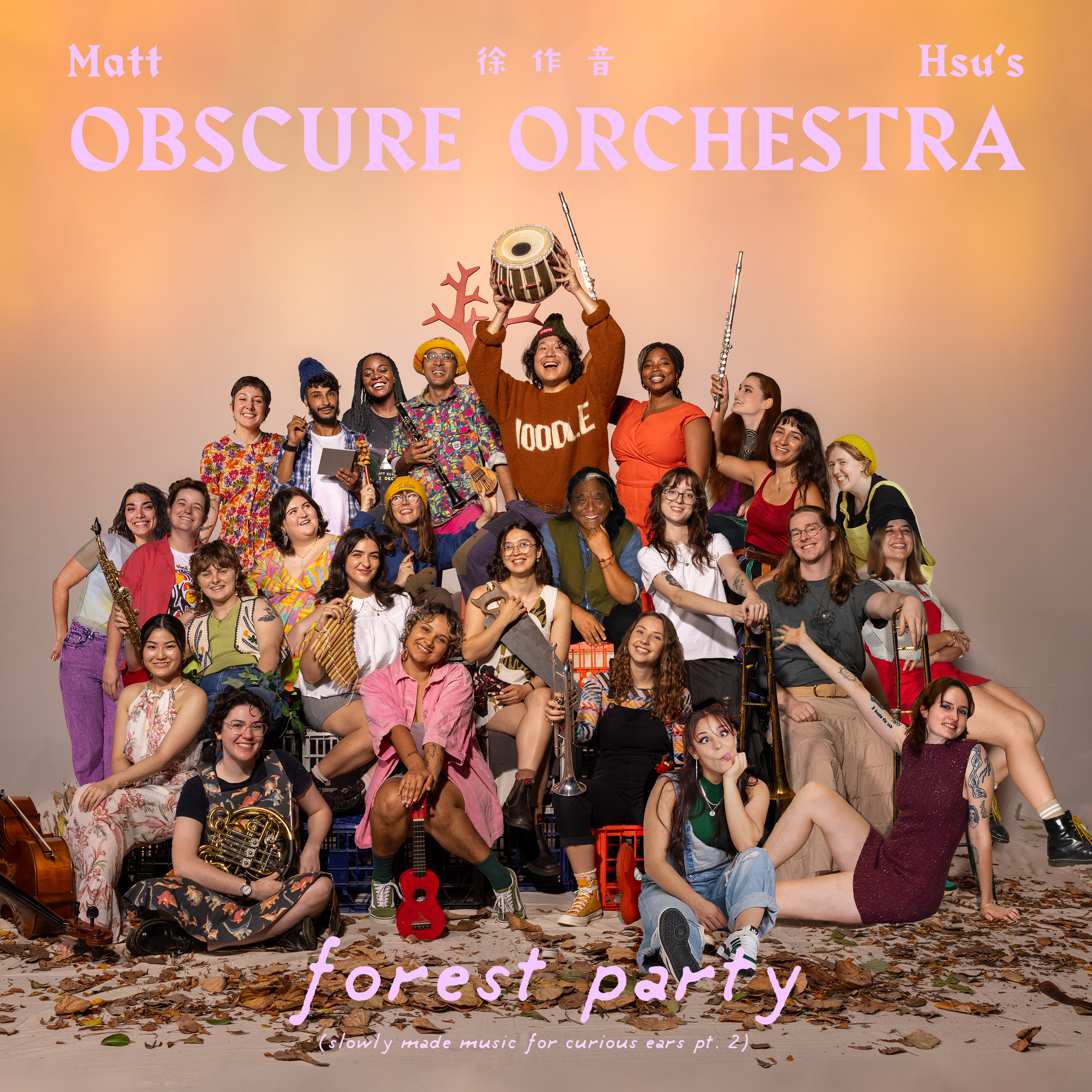
Matt Hsu's Obscure Orchestra 'Forest Party' album cover. Photo by Rod Pilbeam

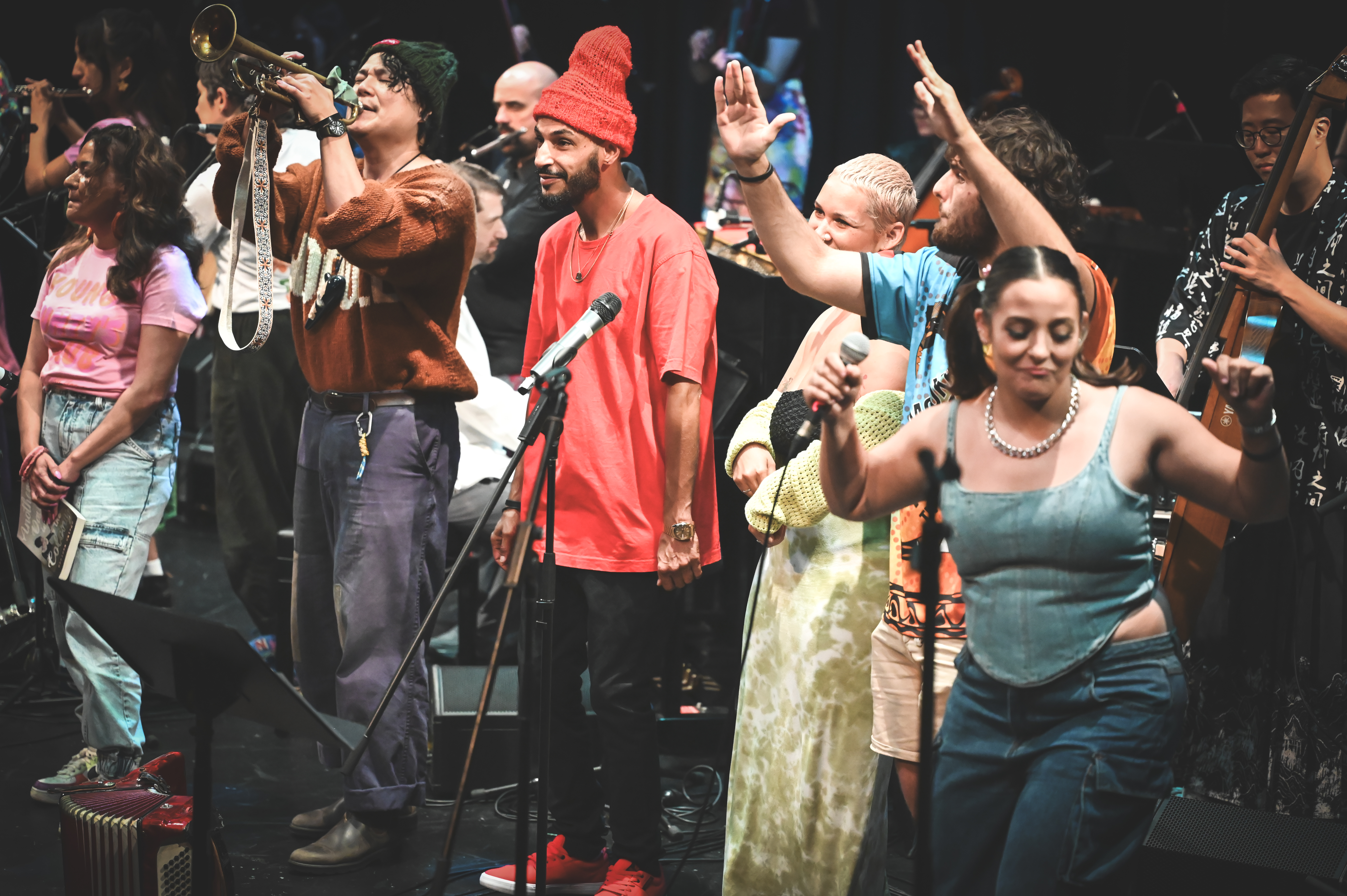
Matt Hsu's Obscure Orchestra photographed by Ange Costes in 2024

=== Formation ===
In 2020, Matt established a live ensemble consisting of Brisbane indie musicians, hip-hop artists, classically trained musicians, and multi-disciplinary artists. Known as Matt Hsu's Obscure Orchestra, the ensemble is "underpinned by gender equity, inclusivity and visibility", and currently comprises 25 core members and frequent guest vocalists, which include culturally diverse, First Nations, disabled, transgender and non-binary artists.

=== Core members ===
- Yvette Ofa Agapow - vibraphone, xylophone
- BADASSMUTHA - vocals
- Sophie Bird - clarinet, sax
- Tenzin Choegyal - vocals, dranyen, limbu
- Nima Doostkhah - rap
- Katherine Gough - violin, viola
- Ai Hasegawa - cello
- Laura Hjortshoj-Haller - french horn
- Matt Hsu - composer, orchestrator, vocals, accordion, trumpet, clarinet, musical saw, shakuhachi, t'rung, found objects
- Andrew Humphreys - trumpet, trombone, euphonium, ukulele
- Georgie-Rose Jurss - flute
- Courts Lovell - clarinet, soprano sax, bari sax
- PJ McEwan - violin, viola
- Lucie Pegna - vocals, keys
- Katie Randall - drum kit
- Han Reardon-Smith - flute, bass flute
- Saro Roro - vocals, flute
- Jodie Rottle - flute, found objects
- Skylar Sansome - marimba
- Gabby Spina - harp
- Jonathan Sriranganathan - tenor sax, vocals
- Kaya Tominaga - taiko, rap, toy piano, ukulele, bongos
- Caroline Townsend - double bass
- Ebony Westwood - trumpet
- Fiona Wheeler - trombone, slide trumpet, ukulele, vocals

=== Reserve members ===
- Mika Atkinson - sax
- Antonia Burwell-Rodriguez - french horn
- Sarah Probets - cello
- Clair Wheatley - clarinet

=== Past members ===
- Aimee Harris - harp, viola
- Alice Wheeler - trumpet
- Fin Nicol-Taylor - orchestrator, trumpet, trombone, euphonium, ukulele
- Flora Wong - violin, viola
- Jen Horn - accordion, piano
- Kathryn Bermingham - clarinet, baritone sax
- Lisa Kelly - harp
- Maja Salamon - flute, violin
- Steph McIntyre - drum kit
- Tristan Rogers - trumpet

=== Guests and collaborators ===
- apadalia - vocals, artwork
- Ashleigh Djokic - vocals, artwork
- Blaq Carrie - rap
- Ethan Enoch - rap
- Kenta Hayashi - guitar
- Aurora Liddle-Christie - vocalist
- Cait Lin 凱琳 - vocalist
- L-FRESH the Lion - rap
- Loopy! 鹿皮 - vocals, artwork
- Mack Ridge - rap
- Naavikaran - spoken word
- Anisa Nandaula - spoken word
- Nardean - rap
- Rina - vocals
- Sachém - rap
- SOLCHLD - vocals, rap
- Zy The Wway - Taiwanese jazz ensemble
- 老莫 ILL MO - rap
- 春艷 - rap
