= Tenzin Choegyal =

Tibetan musician

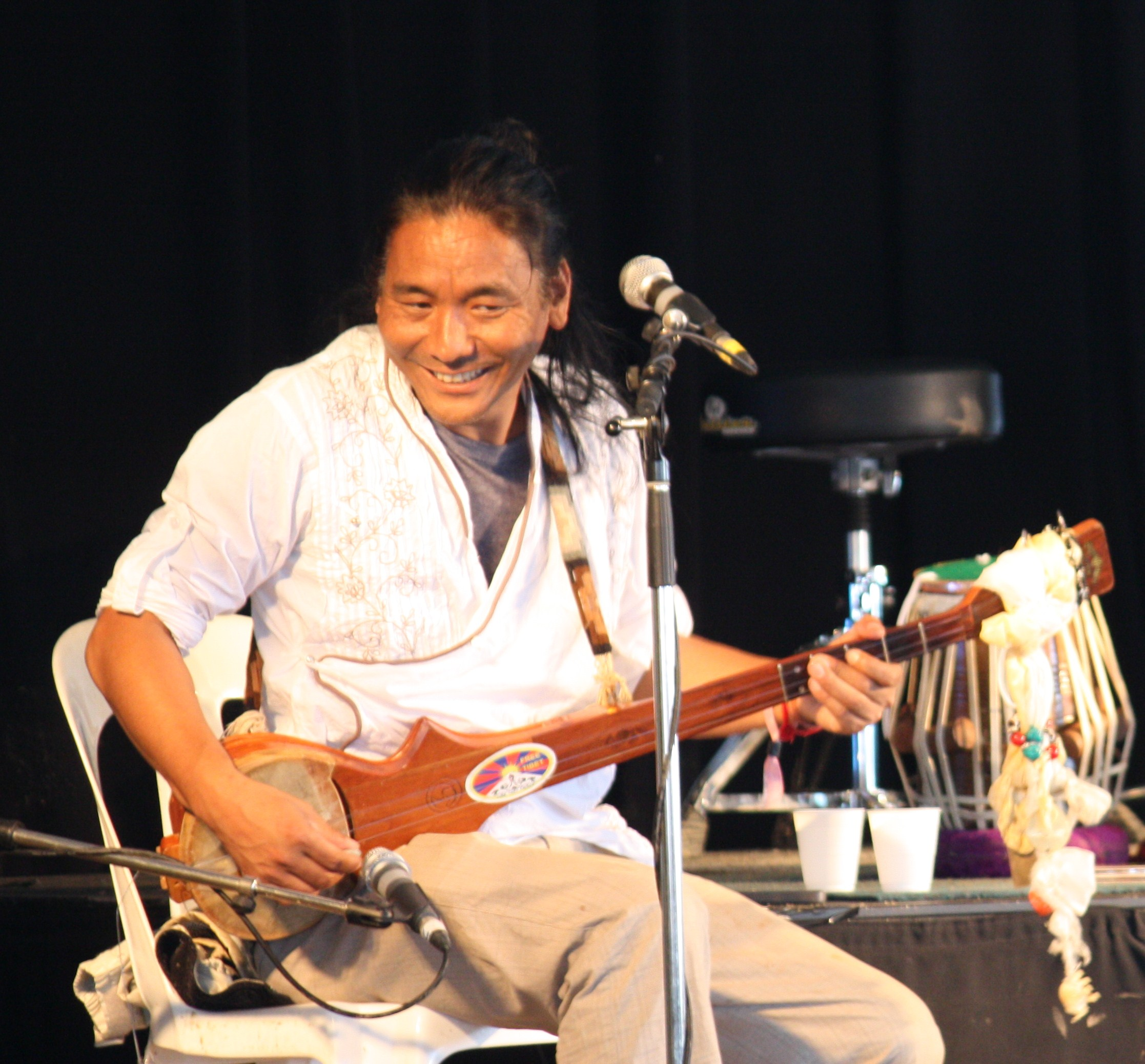
- Tenzin Choegyal
- Born: Tibet
- Occupation: Singer-songwriter
- Musical career
- Website: tenzinchoegyal.com

Tenzin Choegyal is a musician from Tibet.

== Biography ==
As a child in Ngari Prefecture, he listened to his mother's songs in the style of Tibetan nomads, and he attributes much of his passion to his mother.

In 1997, he moved to Australia where he made his debut in the world of Australian music. Choegyal has worked with many prominent musicians, including Philip Glass, Laurie Anderson, Michael Askill, Matt Hsu's Obscure Orchestra, Shen Flindell, Spiros Rantos, Ash Grunwald, Paul Coppen, Stringmansassy, Oscar and Marigold, Riley Lee, James Coats, Tsering Dorjee Bawa, Baatar Sukh, Katherine Philp, Cathedral Band, and Marcello Milani, to name a few. Choegyal has also performed to packed audiences in Carnegie Hall as well as the Sydney Opera House

He has also performed with Tibetan monks in exile, whom he supports financially through his tours, as well as the Tibetan Children's Villages, the school for Tibetan refugee children which he attended as a child.

In 2020, Choegyal's album 'Songs from The Bardo' was nominated at the 63rd Grammy Awards. Along with his two collaborators Laurie Anderson and Jesse Paris Smith the album was nominated for the Best New Age Album.

The album is inspired by the 'Tibetan Book of the Dead' that is a guide to embrace death and transition the consciousness to another life through rebirth.

In August 2024, Choegyal released an album titled 'Whispering Sky'. The album is a product of a slow, experimental recording process across Australia, Japan, Canada and the UK, which blends the voices of international collaborators with Choegyal's nomadic Tibetan roots.

In November 2024, Choegyal collaborated with Matt Corby and Rohin Jones to release a single titled Snow Flower. Snow Flower is the title track of their upcoming collaborative album, scheduled for release on April 4, 2025.

== Awards ==
=== ARIA Music Awards ===
The ARIA Music Awards is an annual awards ceremony that recognises excellence, innovation, and achievement across all genres of Australian music. They commenced in 1987.

Year	Nominee / work	Award	Result	Ref.
2025	Snow Flower	Best World Music Album	Nominated	
2026	Be the Sky (with Philip Glass)	Best World Music Album	Nominated	

=== Queensland Music Awards ===
The Queensland Music Awards (previously known as Q Song Awards) are annual awards celebrating Queensland, Australia's brightest emerging artists and established legends. They commenced in 2006.

Year	Nominee / work	Award	Result (wins only)
2008	"Crane Song"	World / Folk Song of the Year	Won
2026	"Snow Flower"	World Award	Won
