= Trina Massey =

Australian politician

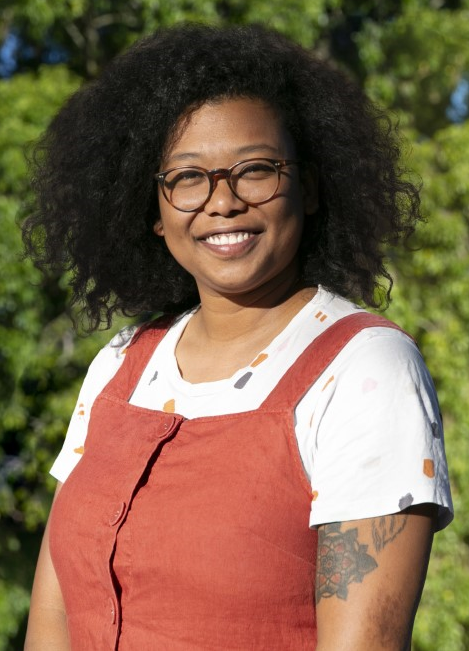

Councillor of the City of Brisbane for The Gabba Ward
- Incumbent
- Assumed office 21 April 2023
- Preceded by: Jonathan Sriranganathan

Personal details
- Party: Greens
- Website: www.trinamassey.com

Trina Massey is an Australian politician who has represented The Gabba Ward of the Brisbane City Council since 2023, succeeding Jonathan Sriranganathan after his resignation. She is a member of the Australian Greens.

== Biography ==
Massey is of African-American and Filipino descent. She was raised in Stafford and has lived in Brisbane for most of her life. During her early 20s, she worked with the United Nations in Skopje, North Macedonia. She also lived in Amsterdam. Upon returning to Brisbane, she became a DJ in the local music scene, later starting a record label and music management business. She went on to produce the Queensland Music Awards and became a product manager at QMusic, as well as later becoming the event program organiser for Little BIGSOUND. She later started a mental health program for artists and artist managers named Gimme Shelter.

Massey is queer. She currently lives in Woolloongabba.

=== Political career ===
Massey joined the Greens after the 2019 federal election. Prior to becoming a Brisbane city council member, she worked at the Ipswich City Council delivering and implementing policy. She ran to become a city council member for the Central Ward in the 2020 local elections. She became a member of the Brisbane City Council after Sriranganathan resigned in 2023 after being selected through an internal election by the Greens. She is the first queer woman of color to hold office in Queensland.

She has criticised the removal of homeless encampments from the Brisbane area, describing the removals as "cruel and hypocritical".

Massey briefly took a hiatus from campaigning in 2024 after she helped MP and fellow Greens member Amy MacMahon after she was seriously injured in a car crash in 2024. She was elected to a term in her own right in 2024.

In 2024, she was ordered by the LNP-led Brisbane City Council to pay $20,000 for the publication of a community newsletter sent to voters in the Gabba Ward that contained pro-Palestinian content written by academic Dr. Jamal Nablusi.
