= Steven Marshall (whistleblower) =

Australian whistleblower in the Queensland Police Service

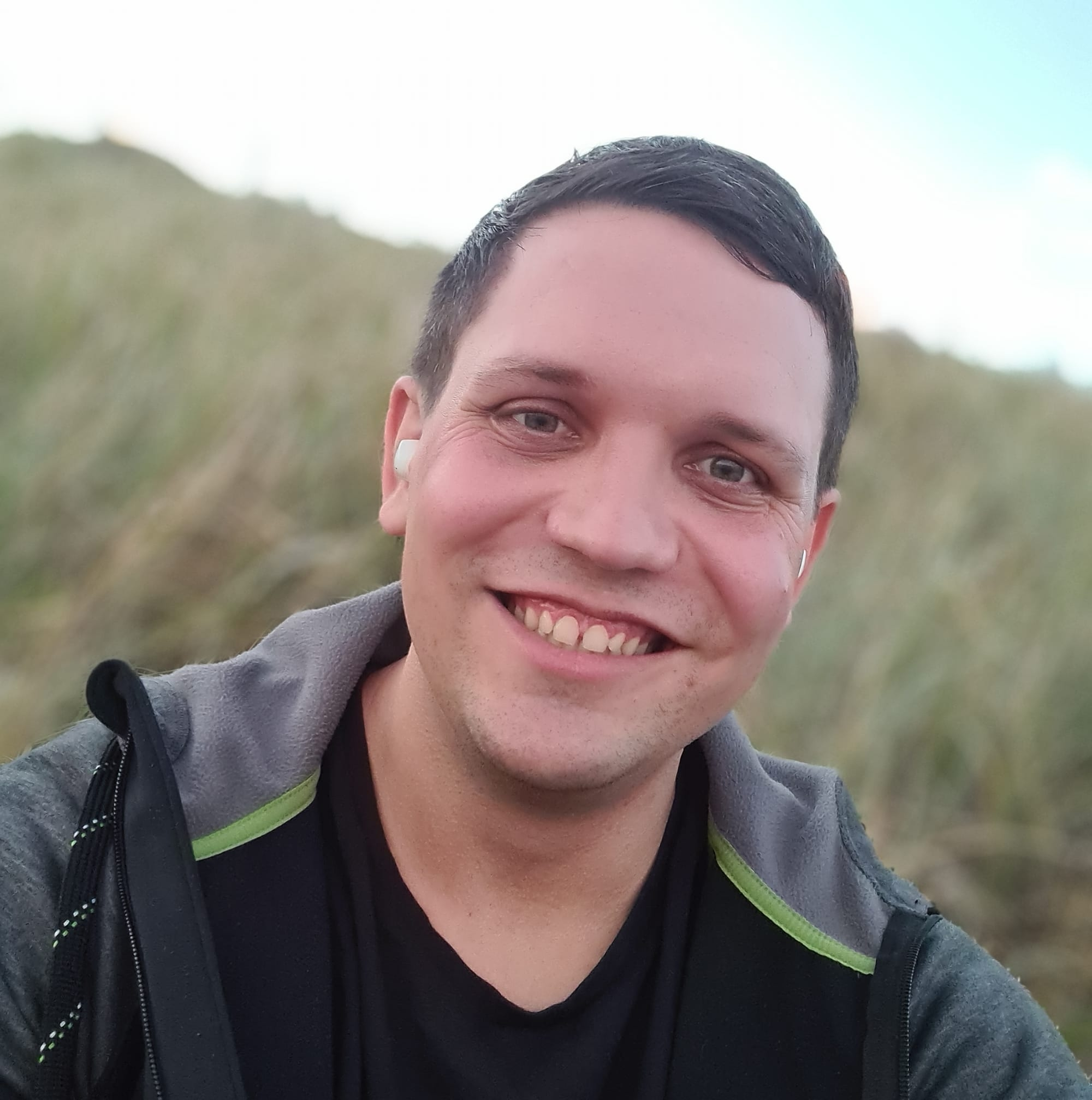
- Steven Marshall in 2021
- Born: 12 December 1989 (age 36); Cairns, Queensland
- Known for: Whistleblowing
- Police career
- Country: Australia
- Department: Queensland Police Service
- Service years: 2012–2023
- Rank: Senior Watch House Officer

Steven Marshall (born 12 December 1989) is an Australian whistleblower and senior watch house officer in the Queensland Police Service. He is known for leaking information about racism, sexual harassment and human rights abuses in the Queensland Police Service between 2022 and 2023.

== Career ==
=== Background ===
Marshall has been a watch house officer since 2012, first working in Cairns, before being stationed at Brisbane City Watch House in 2016. Marshall first lodged internal complaints and made allegations of misconduct within the Queensland Police Service, but felt they were not addressed by the chain of command. He then sent recordings of officers making racist remarks and advocating for violence against protesters and minorities to Mark Ryan, Queensland Minister for Police and Corrective Services. In his email to Ryan's office, Marshall told Ryan that the reprisals he faced for reporting misconduct were "detrimental to my career, health and future job prospects". However, Ryan chose not to meet with Marshall and forwarded the matter back to the Queensland Police Service, an action which Marshall claimed put him at risk.

Marshall reportedly received reprimands from his superiors because of this, and faced further reprisals within the police service. In November 2022, Marshall was reportedly on leave from the police service.

=== Whistleblower allegations of racism and misconduct ===
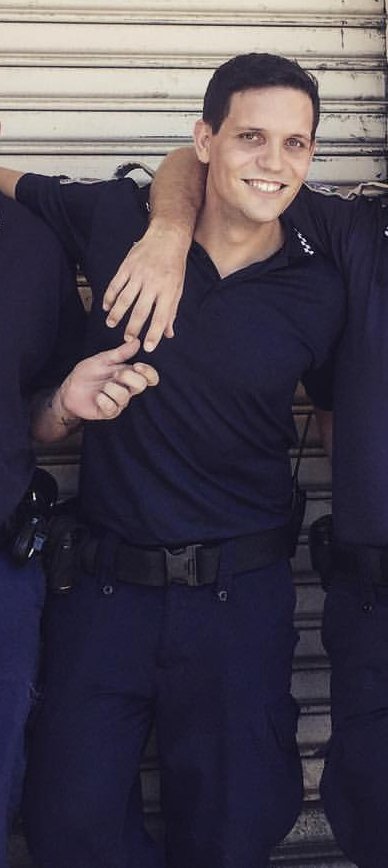
Marshall in 2019

Marshall leaked audio recordings of police and watch house officers at the Brisbane City Watch House making racist, Islamophobic and violent remarks to the daily newspaper The Guardian. On 13 November 2022, The Guardian published the leaked recordings, which were reportedly recorded in 2019. In the recordings, officers describe Aboriginal Australians and other minorities using racial slurs. The officers also discuss fears that Australia will be "taken over" by minorities, and joke about killing black people and "skull-dragging" protesters.

Marshall also submitted evidence to the Independent Commission of Inquiry into the Queensland Police Service Responses to Domestic and Family Violence. The commission heard testimony and evidence of widespread harassment and sexual assault directed at female members of the police service. It also found that police responses to incidents of domestic violence were lacking. The inquiry's final report stated that "the commission has found clear evidence of a culture where attitudes of misogyny, sexism and racism."

The inquiry's chair, Judge Deborah Richards, recommended widespread reforms in the police service to prevent "gatekeeping" and harassment towards victims and witnesses of misconduct. Richards blamed a "failure of the leadership of the organisation" and a work culture which allowed bigotry and abuse to flourish. Richards described Queensland police commissioner Katarina Carroll of being "deliberately obfuscating" and "wilfully blind" in the evidence she presented, which Carroll denied.

The Queensland Police Ethics Command and Crime and Corruption Commission launched their own investigations into the recordings.

==== Reactions ====
In November 2022, the Acting Deputy Commissioner Mark Wheeler issued an apology on behalf of the Queensland Police Service, calling the behaviour in the leaked recordings "appalling". He claimed to have been in communication with Marshall since October 2022. Commissioner Carroll condemned the behaviour in the recordings and praised Marshall for coming forward. However, she denied any prior awareness of institutional racism or sexism with the service.

Queensland Premier Annastacia Palaszczuk described the recordings as "horrific". Queensland Attorney General Shannon Fentiman called the remarks in the recordings "disgusting" and stated that they pointed to "cultural issues within the Queensland Police". Other politicians, such as Liberal National Party leader David Crisafulli, called for institutional reforms with the police service.

Queensland human rights commissioner Scott McDougall called for independent oversight of the police service, and recommended a "thorough examination of recruitment, training, supervision and disciplinary procedures, and ongoing evaluation of the practices and organisational culture of the service." Kevin Yow Yeh, director of the Institute for Collaborative Race Research, felt that the racial remarks made in the recordings were "common" among the police force.

The Guardian later reported that posts attacking Marshall and defending the behaviour in the leaked audio recordings were being posted in a private Facebook group for current and former Queensland police officers. The posts called Marshall a "rat" and a "dog".

The publication of the tapes was included in Guardian Australia's list of the top 10 stories of the decade.

=== Allegations of human rights abuses ===
In February 2023, Marshall submitted further allegations that human rights abuses had occurred at the Brisbane City Watch House between 2018 and 2019, some of which involved minors. These alleged human rights abuses included illegal strip searches of minors, and placing children in cells with adult prisoners of the opposite sex, which led to incidents in which adult prisoners exposed themselves to children and engaged in sexually inappropriate behaviour. Marshall claimed that prisoners were routinely denied clothing, toilet paper and other amenities by watch house supervisors, and that witnesses were intimidated into not pressing charges against individuals who assaulted them. The allegations also included reports of watch house officers wrapping towels around the heads of detainees as unauthorized spit hoods or to simulate waterboarding.

Marshall's allegations were made at the same time that the Parliament of Queensland was considering a youth crime bill that would override the Queensland Human Rights Act, and make breach of bail a criminal offense for minors and extend electronic monitoring to juvenile offenders. Marshall claimed that the youth crime bill would place strain on the detention centers and cause "chaos" at watch houses which were not equipped to handle an increase in numbers of detainees.

The allegations were submitted to the state economic and governance committee examining the youth crime bill, but was removed from its website and made confidential shortly after. MP Michael Berkman tabled Marshall's report before parliament on 15 March 2023, and accused the committee of trying to "bury" Marshall's claims. A spokesperson for the Queensland Police Ethics Command told the press that they had launched a review of these claims on March 13.
