= Scott Emerson (politician) =

Australian politician and journalist

Shadow Treasurer Shadow Minister for Small Business
- In office 6 May 2016 – 25 November 2017
- Leader: Tim Nicholls
- Preceded by: John-Paul Langbroek (Treasury); Tim Nicholls (Small Business)
- Succeeded by: Tim Mander (Treasury); Fiona Simpson (Small Business)

Shadow Minister for Transport
- In office 14 February 2015 – 6 May 2016
- Leader: Lawrence Springborg
- Preceded by: Jackie Trad (Transport); Mark Bailey (Main Roads)
- Succeeded by: Andrew Powell
- In office 11 April 2011 – 19 February 2012
- Leader: Campbell Newman
- Preceded by: Fiona Simpson
- Succeeded by: Desley Scott

Minister for Transport and Main Roads
- In office 3 April 2012 – 14 February 2015
- Premier: Campbell Newman
- Preceded by: Annastacia Palaszczuk (Transport); Craig Wallace (Main Roads)
- Succeeded by: Jackie Trad (Transport); Mark Bailey (Main Roads)

Shadow Minister for Science, Research and Information and Communication Technology
- In office 29 November 2010 – 11 April 2011
- Leader: John-Paul Langbroek
- Preceded by: Janet Stuckey
- Succeeded by: Ros Bates

Member of the Queensland Parliament for Indooroopilly
- In office 21 March 2009 – 25 November 2017
- Preceded by: Ronan Lee
- Succeeded by: district abolished
- Majority: 6.73% (2015)

Personal details
- Born: 15 January 1964 (age 62) Ipswich, Queensland, Australia
- Party: Liberal National Party
- Education: University of Queensland
- Occupation: Journalist, public relations coordinator

Scott Anthony Emerson (born 15 January 1964) is a former Australian politician and journalist. He is a director of national consulting firm GXO Strategies and a commentator on Nine Entertainment’s national breakfast television program Today. He hosted the Scott Emerson Drive Show on Brisbane talkback radio station 4BC from 2020 to 2022. He served as the Minister for Transport and Main Roads Minister in the Newman Ministry from 2012 to 2015. In the Legislative Assembly of Queensland he represented the seat of Indooroopilly in Brisbane's inner-west, from 2009 to 2017. Indooroopilly was abolished at the 2017 state election and Emerson chose to contest the new seat of Maiwar which had a notional LNP margin of 3%; Emerson was unsuccessful in his bid, losing to the Greens candidate Michael Berkman.

== Early life ==
Emerson was born in Ipswich, Queensland, where his father, an officer in the Royal Australian Air Force (RAAF), was working at the nearby Amberley Air Force base. Emerson attended schools across Australia and overseas as his family moved with the RAAF. He graduated from high school in Canberra, in the Australian Capital Territory.

Emerson attended the University of Queensland where he graduated in 1985 with a Bachelor of Arts degree with majors in law and journalism and 1987 with a Bachelor of Economics. While at university, he edited the student newspaper Semper Floreat in 1986 and was chairman of the Journalism Students Association. During his studies he resided at St Leo's College.

== Early career ==
Emerson began his media career in 1988 as a cadet journalist with the Australian Broadcasting Corporation (ABC) in Brisbane and helped launch Triple J in Queensland in 1990. In 1991 he moved to Sydney to work as a reporter on ABC Radio's current affairs programs, AM, PM and The World Today. He returned to Brisbane in 1992 as the senior Queensland reporter for ABC Radio Current Affairs. In 1994 he joined the national newspaper The Australian as its Queensland political reporter. In 1998 he was appointed the paper's Queensland Bureau Chief and in 2000 was National Chief of staff for The Australian during the Sydney Olympics.

In 2001 he was awarded a Churchill Fellowship to study political campaigning, including undertaking research at Harvard University and in Washington D.C.

In 2004 he left The Australian to become a director and equity partner in Brisbane-based public and media relations firm Crook Publicity.

In 2009 he contested the seat of Indooroopilly at the Queensland state election for the Liberal National Party of Queensland.

Emerson was co-founder of the St Lucia Community Association and held executive roles on local P&Fs including at Nudgee Junior College and Brisbane Boys College. He was a team manager at Wests Junior Rugby from 2005 to 2007. Emerson was also a volunteer at RSPCA Australia where he worked as a qualified dog trainer at weekends.

== Political career ==
Emerson was elected to the Queensland Parliament at 21 March 2009 state election, representing the seat of Indooroopilly for the Liberal National Party with a two-party-preferred vote of 56 per cent. At the election he defeated Labor's candidate Sarah Warner and the sitting member Ronan Lee from the Queensland Greens, who defected from the Labor in 2008.

On 24 March 2012, Emerson was re-elected as the Member for Indooroopilly for the Liberal National Party, contributing to the party's total of 78, giving the party a majority for the first time in the Parliament, and subsequently forming government.

At the election Emerson achieved a swing of 14 points with a first preference vote of 61% and a two-party preferred vote of 70%, the highest of any candidate in the seat of Indooroopilly's history.

Emerson was appointed as the Transport and Main Roads Minister in the first Newman Ministry. and was sworn in by the Governor on Tuesday 3 April 2012 at Queensland Government House.

On 31 January 2015, Emerson was re-elected as the Member for Indooroopilly for the LNP despite the party narrowly losing the overall election.

After the election, Emerson was appointed the LNP's Shadow Transport Minister in the Queensland Parliament.

A Shadow Cabinet reshuffle on 9 May 2016, saw Emerson appointed as the LNP's Shadow Treasurer and Shadow Minister for Small Business.

At the 2017 State Election, Scott was unable to win re-election for the new seat of Maiwar which covered a significant part of his former electorate. The seat was won by Michael Berkman from the Queensland Greens who secured a 7.4% swing in his favour.

== Post politics ==
After leaving parliament in 2017 Emerson returned to business consultancy and journalism, writing columns for The Australian and as a contributor on Sky News Australia.

In August 2020 Emerson became the host of The Scott Emerson Drive Show on Brisbane talkback radio station 4BC, saying he was "back to being a poacher from a gamekeeper".

In May 2022, in the week after the 2022 Australian federal election, Emerson’s interview with Labor Party senior frontbencher Tanya Plibersek sparked national headlines when Plibersek likened incoming Coalition leader and former senior Liberal Party minister Peter Dutton to Harry Potter villain Voldemort. Plibersek later apologised to Dutton with Prime Minister Anthony Albanese saying her comments were a mistake.

In July 2022 he was appointed to the new role of political contributor across Nine Entertainment’s national radio network. He also became a director of national government and media consulting firm GXO Strategies.

== Personal life ==
Described as an avid adventurer, Emerson has trekked the Himalayas including the 5400m Thorong La pass, climbed the 5900m Mount Kilimanjaro and hiked the Kokoda Trail. He has also wing walked on a biplane while it performed aerobatics and, for charity, abseiled Brisbane's 134m AMP tower and swung off the Goodwill Bridge. Emerson regularly competes in open water swimming races and in 2023 swam 3.2 km from Alcatraz Island to the shore across San Francisco Bay. In 2024 he completed the 5 km inter-continental swim from Europe to Asia across the Dardanelles in Turkey, replicating the Hellespont swim undertaken in the Greek myth of the lovers Hero and Leander and by the poet Lord Byron in 1810. In 2025 he swam the Strait of Messina from Sicily to mainland Italy, a 4 km stretch of water known for its strong currents and dangerous seas mentioned in The Odyssey by Homer as the home of the mythical Greek sea monsters Scylla and Charybdis. That same year he competed in the international 4.5 km Costa Brava ocean swim race in the coastal region of Catalonia in northeastern Spain.

Parliament of Queensland
Preceded by Ronan Lee	Member for Indooroopilly; 2009–2017	Abolished
