= Jonathan Sriranganathan =

Australian politician and activist

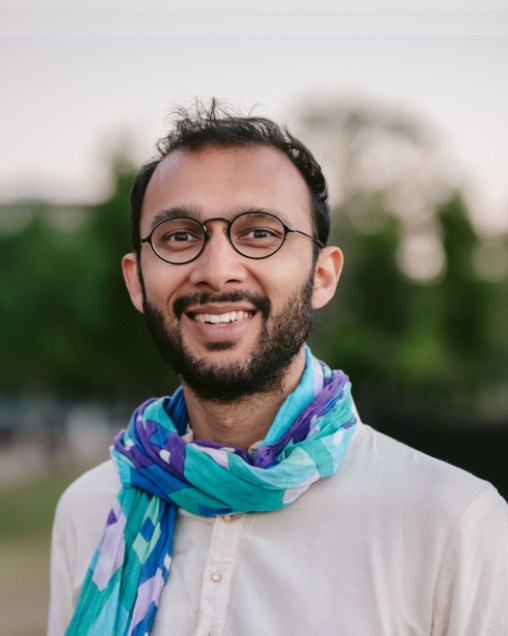

Councillor of the City of Brisbane for The Gabba Ward
- In office 12 April 2016 – 21 April 2023
- Preceded by: Helen Abrahams
- Succeeded by: Trina Massey

Personal details
- Born: Jonathan Sri Brisbane, Queensland, Australia
- Party: Greens
- Education: University of Queensland (LLB, BA)
- Website: jonathansri.com

Jonathan Sriranganathan (/ˈsriːrʌŋɡənɑːðən/ SREE-rung-gə-nah-dhən; né Sri) is an Australian activist and politician. He was the first ever Queensland Greens councillor, representing The Gabba Ward on the Brisbane City Council from 2016 to 2023.

== Early life and education ==
Sriranganathan has a Bachelor of Laws (Hons) and Bachelor of Arts with majors in Journalism and Aboriginal and Torres Strait Islander Studies from The University of Queensland. He has previously worked at a corporate law firm. Prior to being elected he was a musician and beat poet.

== Political career ==
=== State politics ===
Sriranganathan stood as the Greens candidate for South Brisbane at the 2015 Queensland state election, where he received 21.8% of the primary vote. He was defeated by former Labor MP Jackie Trad, and placed third after the Liberal National Party.

=== Local politics ===
Sriranganathan stood as a candidate for The Gabba Ward at the 2016 Brisbane City Council election, held on 19 March, where he received 31.7% of the primary vote. Preferences from the Labor candidate, Nicole Lessio, gave Sriranganathan 55% of the two-party-preferred vote, and he declared victory on 23 March after receiving a concession call from Lessio.

He was sworn in on 12 April 2016, becoming both Queensland's first Greens councillor and Queensland's first elected representative of Sri Lankan Tamil heritage in Queensland.

In 2016, Sriranganathan organised human barricades and protests against the controversial West Village development in West End. The development still went ahead but significant changes were made to the design.

Sriranganathan stood as a candidate for The Gabba Ward at the 2020 Brisbane City Council election, held on 28 March, where he received 45.6% of the primary vote, an increase of 13.9% from the previous election.

On 26 March 2023, he announced his resignation as councillor, with the seat set to be filled by fellow Greens member Trina Massey. His last official day as councillor was 21 April.

On 16 August 2023, he announced he would be the Greens candidate for mayor in the 2024 Brisbane City Council election. He finished third in the mayoral race, receiving a swing of 4.1% in his favour to win 19.5% of the primary vote.

== Controversies ==
In 2018, Sriranganathan was accused of harassing and stalking a local real estate agent. Official investigations were launched into the complaint and the Brisbane City Council opted not to pursue misconduct charges.

In October 2019, Sriranganathan was fined $1,300 for "inappropriate conduct" by the Councillor Conduct Review Panel, after "posing as a concerned resident in a hoax voicemail" left for state MP Jennifer Howard.

In April 2020, Councillor Sriranganathan was again levied with a fine by the Councillor Conduct Review Panel for inappropriate conduct. Five official complaints were made to the body regarding Sriranganathan's actions during a week-long protest by climate activist group Extinction Rebellion in October 2019. The complainants alleged he called Queensland Police Service "violent and racist" in a Facebook post, while sharing a media report about an Aboriginal man allegedly assaulted by police, and that he published an article on his website that "supported illegal activity", such as the use of road blocks. He was issued with a $2,001 fine, but stated he would not comply.

In February 2021, Councillor Sriranganathan was reprimanded by Brisbane City Council's Councillor Ethics Committee following a complaint made to the Office of the Independent Assessor. The complaint alleged he had offered to use council resources to find landlords' postal addresses and provide them to renters in order to negotiate rental reductions. The committee found this was not an appropriate use of council resources.

In August 2021, the Office of the Independent Assessor (OIA) dismissed 41 complaints made against Sriranganathan concerning a Facebook post relating to a fatal police shooting. The OIA, charged with investigating misconduct by local government officials in Queensland, found no basis for pursuing the matter further. However, independent assessor Kathleen Florian cautioned Councillor Sriranganathan against making statements which "arguably fail to provide high-quality leadership to the community or constitute meaningful community engagement."

=== Misconduct finding ===
In February 2024, the Councillor Conduct Tribunal determined that an allegation of official misconduct made in 2020 against Sriranganathan had been sustained. The allegation related to his conduct at protests within his council ward. He was filmed blocking a road using a council-owned vehicle, and when police questioned if he had authority to do so, responded “yeah, I’m the local councillor, mate”. The assessor found that although he had engaged in misconduct, Sriranganathan would have no action taken against him as he had ceased to be a councillor by the time of the determination.

== Beliefs ==
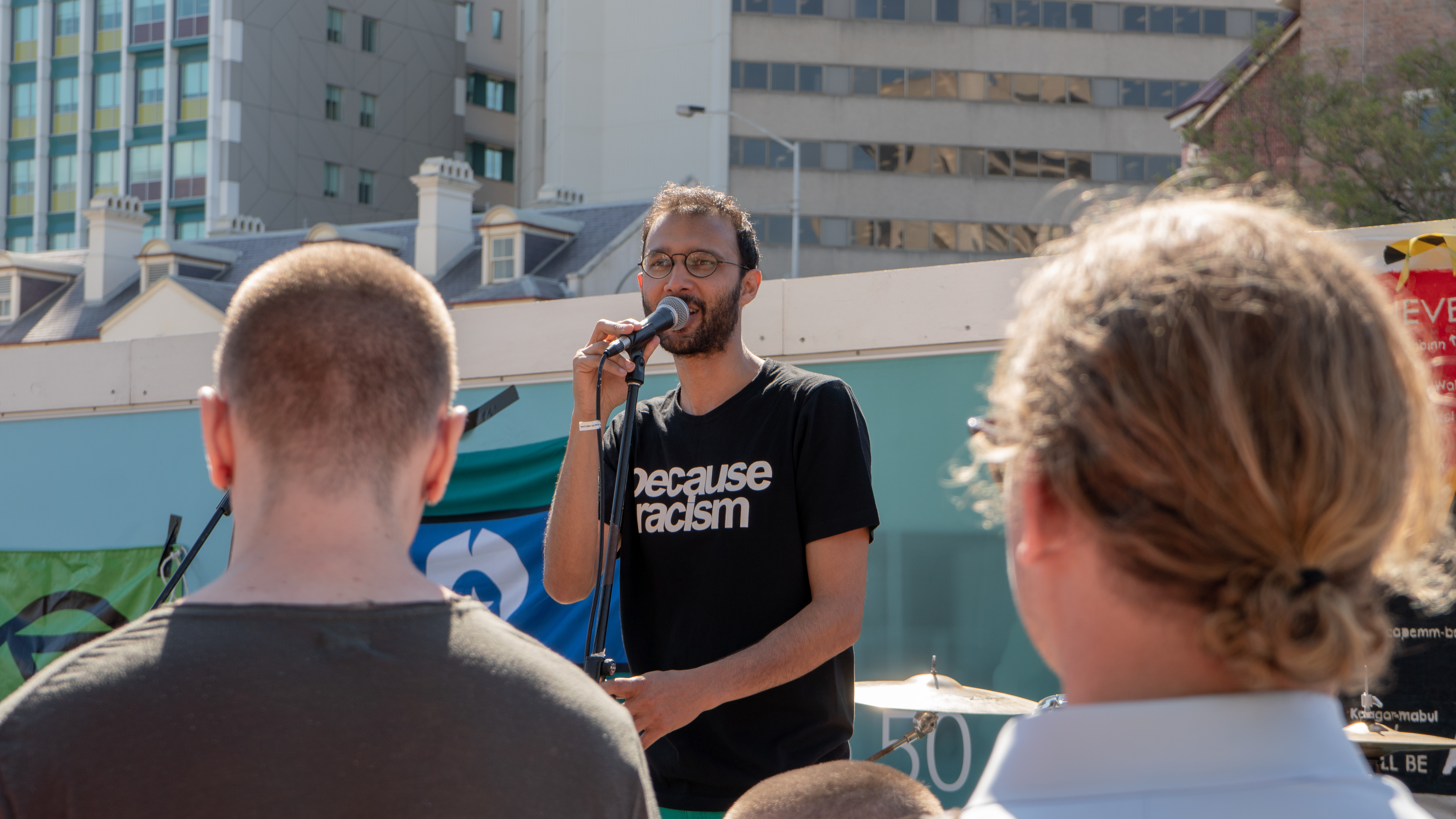
Sriranganathan at Rebellion Day, Brisbane

Sriranganathan has campaigned for a right to the city, and has argued that the function of cities should be centred around democratic control rather than capital accumulation. He is supportive of "public disobedience" as a valid form of political action and has posted information to assist followers in avoiding being fined. He has criticised the behaviour of the Queensland Police Service, describing them as a "violent and racist" institution.

== Personal life ==
Sriranganathan lives on a houseboat moored in the Brisbane River with his partner, stating his purpose for this as wanting to donate half of his $157,782 salary.

He is a saxophonist and vocalist with Brisbane band The Mouldy Lovers. He is known for his spoken word performances.

While his father's full surname is Sriranganathan, Jonathan's name was listed as "Jonathan Sri" on his birth certificate. He was known as Sri until August 2022, when he took his father's full last name in order to "connect... more deeply with different components of [his] identity."
