= Denver Beanland =

Australian politician

Denver Beanland AM
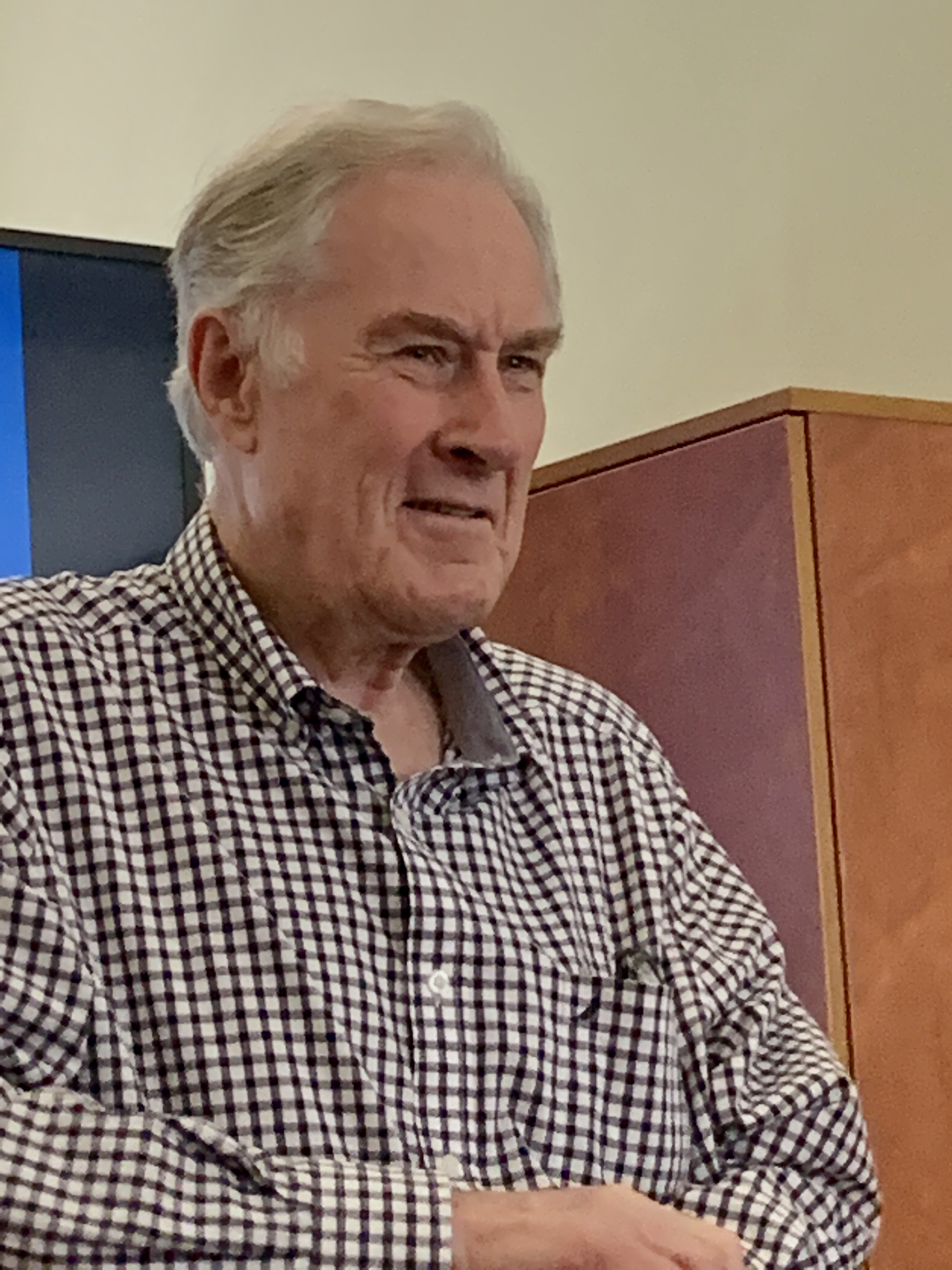
- Denver Beanland, 2019

Manager of Opposition Business in Queensland
- In office 30 July 1998 – 17 February 2001
- Leader: Rob Borbidge
- Preceded by: Terry Mackenroth
- Succeeded by: Kev Lingard

Attorney-General of Queensland and Minister for Justice
- In office 26 February 1996 – 26 June 1998
- Premier: Rob Borbidge
- Preceded by: Matt Foley
- Succeeded by: Matt Foley

Deputy Leader of the Queensland Liberal Party
- In office 31 July 1995 – 23 June 1998
- Leader: Joan Sheldon
- Preceded by: Santo Santoro
- Succeeded by: Bob Quinn
- In office 19 December 1989 – 13 May 1990
- Leader: Angus Innes
- Preceded by: Peter Beard
- Succeeded by: David Watson

Shadow Attorney-General Shadow Minister for Justice
- In office 2 November 1992 – 19 February 1996
- Leader: Rob Borbidge
- Preceded by: Tony FitzGerald
- Succeeded by: Matt Foley

Leader of the Queensland Liberal Party
- In office 13 May 1990 – 11 November 1991
- Deputy: David Watson
- Preceded by: Angus Innes
- Succeeded by: Joan Sheldon

Member of the Queensland Legislative Assembly for Indooroopilly Toowong (1986–1992)
- In office 1 November 1986 – 17 February 2001
- Preceded by: Earle Bailey
- Succeeded by: Ronan Lee

Personal details
- Born: Denver Edward Beanland; 26 January 1945 (age 81) Kilcoy, Queensland, Australia
- Party: Liberal Party
- Education: University of Queensland
- Occupation: Bank officer

Denver Edward Beanland AM (born 26 January 1945) is a former politician in Queensland, Australia. He was a Member of the Queensland Legislative Assembly and leader of the Queensland Liberal Party.

== Early life ==
Denver Edward Beanland was born on 26 January 1945 at St Margaret's Private Hospital, Kilcoy, Queensland, the only son of Norman Edward Beanland and his wife Gwendoline (née Runge). The family lived a dairy farm called Avondale (originally owned by Beanland's grandfather Herbert Beanland) located at Mary Smokes Creek, between Kilcoy and Woodford.

Beanland attended the Kalangara State School at Stoney Creek, four miles from his home. He continued his secondary education at Caboolture State High School.

== Local politics ==
Beanland was elected as an Alderman of the Brisbane City Council in 1976 and served on that Council, including a period as Deputy Lord Mayor of Brisbane until 1986.

== State politics ==
In 1986, Beanland was elected to the Legislative Assembly of Queensland, in 1986, as the member for Toowong. He represented Toowong until 1992, at which time it was renamed Indooroopilly.

Beanland was leader of the Liberal Party in the Queensland Parliament from May 1990 until November 1991, when he was ousted by Joan Sheldon. Although he did not return to the Liberal leadership, he became deputy leader in 1995.

Denver Beanland served as Attorney-General in the Borbidge government from February 1996 to 20 June 1998. He also served as Opposition Spokesperson, prior to 1996, for a number of portfolios including Justice, Transport and Land Management.

In 1997 a vote of no-confidence was passed against him as Attorney-General over his role in the Carruthers and Connolly-Ryan Inquiries. In an unprecedented decision he refused to resign in the wake of the no-confidence vote, citing his lack of personal responsibility for the scandal.

He was supported by Premier Rob Borbidge who says he decides who is in his Cabinet not Parliament.

He lost his seat of Indooroopilly at the 2001 state election.

== Later life ==
After leaving politics, Beanland studied at the University of Queensland, completing a Bachelor of Arts and Doctor of Philosophy in history in 2007. The topic of his PhD thesis was former Queensland Premier Thomas McIlwraith.

Denver Beanland has been the President of the Royal Historical Society of Queensland since 2020 after having previously been its President from 2007 to 2009. In 2019 he was elected a Fellow of the Society.

In 2015 Beanland was appointed by the Abbott government to chair the National Archives Advisory Council.

On 7 June 2020, Beanland was appointed a Member of the Order of Australia (AM) for significant service to the people and Parliament of Queensland, and to archival and historical organisations.

== Publications ==
- — (1993). The Family of Thomas and Lydia Emma Kinton Beanland. Boolarong. ISBN 978-0-86439-155-1.
- — (2007). "PhD thesis". Queensland Caesar: Sir Thomas McIlwraith (PDF). School of History, Philosophy, Religion, and Classics, University of Queensland.
- — (2009). A Court Apart: The District Court of Queensland. Supreme Court of Queensland Library. ISBN 978-0-9803220-4-0.
- — (2013). The Queensland Caesar, Sir Thomas McIlwraith. Brisbane Boolarong Press. ISBN 978-1-922109-55-2.

Parliament of Queensland
Preceded by Earle Bailey	Member for Toowong; 1986–1992	Abolished
New seat	Member for Indooroopilly; 1992–2001	Succeeded by Ronan Lee
Political offices
Preceded by Angus Innes	Parliamentary Leader of the Liberal Party in Queensland; 1990–1991	Succeeded by Joan Sheldon
