= The Gabba Ward =

Ward of the City of Brisbane

The Gabba Ward Queensland — Brisbane City Council
- Dates current: 1985–1994; 2008–present
- Councillor: Trina Massey
- Party: Greens
- Namesake: The Gabba
- Electors: 32,754 (2024)
- Demographic: Inner metropolitan

The Gabba Ward is a Brisbane City Council ward covering Woolloongabba, Dutton Park, East Brisbane, Highgate Hill, Kangaroo Point, South Brisbane and West End.

This was the first ward ever won by the Queensland Greens. It is currently held by Trina Massey, who succeeded Jonathan Sriranganathan in 2023 and was elected in her own right in 2024.

== History ==
=== First incarnation ===
The Gabba Ward was first established for the 1985 election, as part of an increase from 21 to 26 wards.

It largely succeeded the abolished Woolloongabba Ward, and covered the current suburbs of Dutton Park, East Brisbane, Highgate Hill, Kangaroo Point, South Brisbane, Stones Corner, West End, and Woolloongabba, along with parts of Annerley, Coorparoo, Greenslopes, and Norman Park.

The ward was won by Tim Quinn for the Labor Party at the 1985 election. Quinn retained the ward at the 1988 and 1991 elections, and represented it until its abolition in 1994.

The 1994 election saw The Gabba Ward largely split between two new wards, Dutton Park and East Brisbane. Incumbent Quinn successfully contested the new Dutton Park ward for the Labor Party, which he represented until becoming Lord Mayor in 2003.

=== Second incarnartion ===
The 2008 election saw the abolition of both Dutton Park and East Brisbane wards, with The Gabba being re-established on similar boundaries to its first incarnation.

Helen Abrahams, the incumbent councillor for the abolished Dutton Park Ward, won the ward for the Labor Party at the 2008 election. Abrahams retained the ward for the party at the 2012 election.

Greens candidate Jonathan Sriranganathan (then known as Sri) won the ward in 2016, with a 14% gain in primary votes. The ward was retained by the Greens at the 2020 election, with a swing towards Sriranganathan of 12.4% in first preference votes, achieving a total of 62.3% of two-party preferred votes.

== Councillors for The Gabba Ward ==
=== First incarnation ===
Image	Member	Party	Term	Notes
	Tim Quinn	Labor	30 March 1985 – 26 March 1994	Ward abolished, successfully contested new Dutton Park Ward at 1994 election.

=== Second incarnation ===
Image	Member	Party	Term	Notes
	Helen Abrahams	Labor	15 March 2008 – 19 March 2016	Councillor for Paddington Ward from 1991–1994. Retired
	Jonathan Sriranganathan	Greens	19 March 2016 – 21 April 2023	Known as Jonathan Sri until 2022. First ever Queensland Greens councillor. Resigned to run for Lord Mayor at 2024 election
	Trina Massey	Greens	21 April 2023 – present	Incumbent

== Results ==
=== 2024 ===
2024 Queensland local elections: The Gabba Ward
Party	Candidate	Votes	%	±%
Greens	Trina Massey	11,463	45.12	−0.48
Liberal National	Laura Wong	7,899	31.09	+1.69
Labor	Rebecca McIntosh	6,043	23.79	−1.21
Total formal votes		25,405	98.28	
Informal votes		444	1.72	
Turnout		25,849	78.92	
Two-candidate-preferred result
Greens	Trina Massey	13,554	60.84	−1.46
Liberal National	Laura Wong	8,995	39.16	+1.46
Greens hold		Swing	−1.46	

=== 2020 ===
2020 Queensland local elections: The Gabba Ward
Party	Candidate	Votes	%	±%
Greens	Jonathan Sri	9,383	45.6	+12.4
Liberal National	Nathaniel Jones	6,060	29.4	–4.8
Labor	Rachel Gallagher	5,136	25.0	–5.2
Total formal votes		20,579	97.7	+0.6
Informal votes		495	2.3	–0.6
Turnout		21,074	–	–
Notional two-party-preferred count
Labor	Rachel Gallagher	9,753	58.4	N/A
Liberal National	Nathaniel Jones	6,959	41.6	N/A
Two-party-preferred result
Greens	Jonathan Sri	11,418	62.3	+5.3
Liberal National	Nathaniel Jones	6,899	37.7	–5.3
Greens hold		Swing	+5.3	

=== 2016 ===
2016 Queensland local elections: The Gabba Ward
Party	Candidate	Votes	%	±%
Liberal National	Sean Jacobs	7,712	35.9	–1.1
Greens	Jonathan Sri	6,823	31.7	+13.8
Labor	Nicole Lessio	6,457	30.0	–15.1
People Decide	Leon Lechner	516	2.4	+2.4
Total formal votes		21,508	97.1	–1.1
Informal votes		649	2.9	+1.1
Turnout		22,157	100	–
Notional two-party-preferred count
Labor	Nicole Lessio		58.4	–1.4
Liberal National	Sean Jacobs		41.6	+1.4
Two-party-preferred result
Greens	Jonathan Sri	10,194	55.0	+55.0
Liberal National	Sean Jacobs	8,336	45.0	+3.3
Greens gain from Labor		Swing	+55.0	

=== 2012 ===
2012 Brisbane City Council election: The Gabba Ward
Party	Candidate	Votes	%	±%
Labor	Helen Abrahams	8,637	45.12	+9.33
Liberal National	Francis Quinlivan	7,117	37.18	+0.03
Greens	Gary Kane	3,387	17.70	–7.94
Informal votes		356	1.83	+0.09
Two-party-preferred result
Labor	Helen Abrahams	7,753	59.76	+7.03
Liberal National	Francis Quinlivan	5,220	40.24	–7.03
Labor hold		Swing	+7.03	

=== 2008 ===
2008 Queensland local elections: The Gabba Ward
Party	Candidate	Votes	%	±%
Liberal	Matthew Myers	7,275	37.15	+8.04
Labor	Helen Abrahams	7,008	35.79	–4.32
Greens	Drew Hutton	5,021	25.64	–0.12
Independent	David Norton	279	1.42	+1.42
Informal votes		347	1.74	–0.44
Two-party-preferred result
Labor	Helen Abrahams	8,641	52.73	–6.97
Liberal	Matthew Myers	7,746	47.27	+6.97
Labor notional hold		Swing	–6.97	
