= Ronan Lee =

Politician Academic and Author

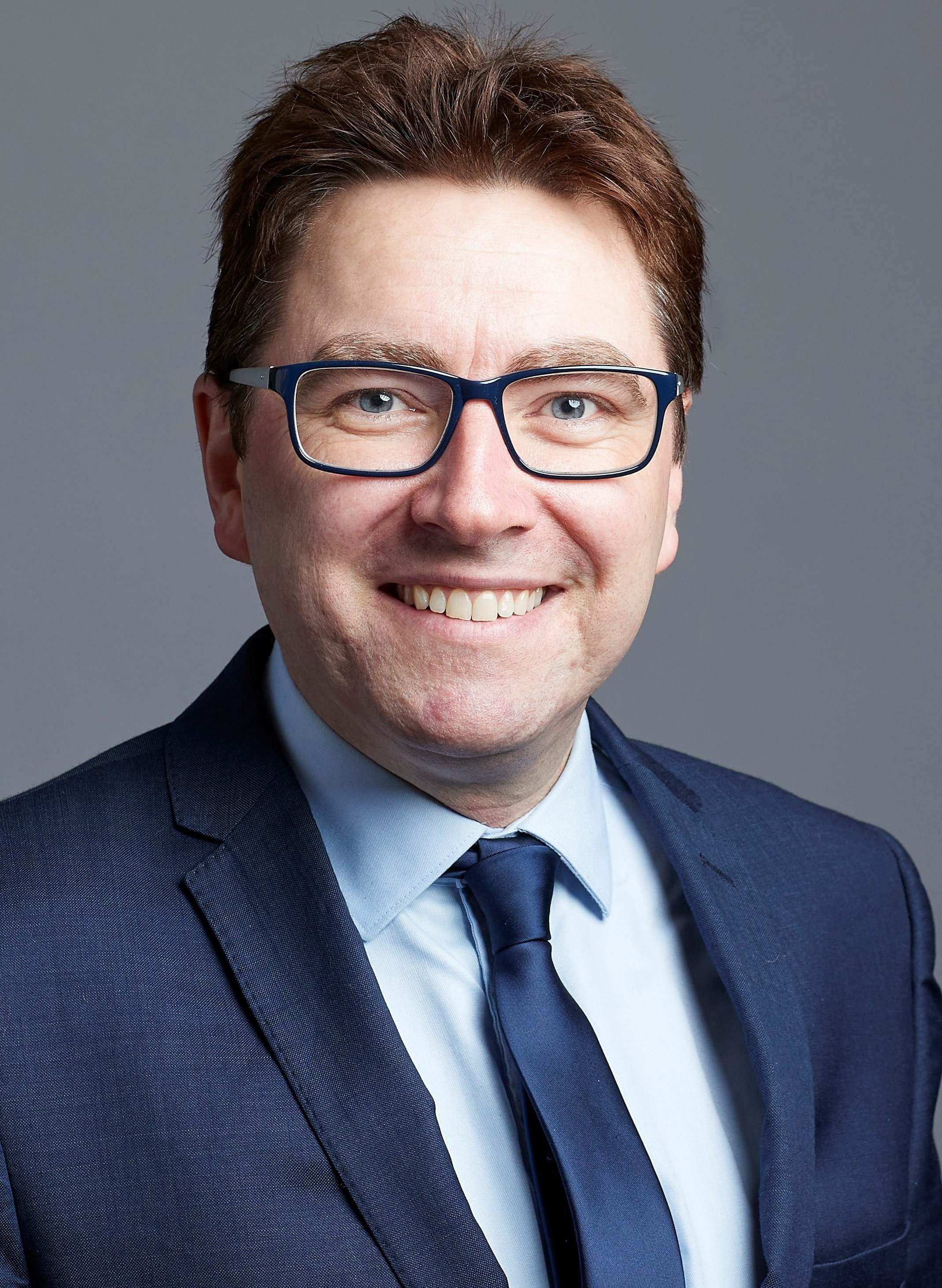
- Lee in 2019.

Member of the Queensland Legislative Assembly for Indooroopilly
- In office 17 February 2001 – 21 March 2009
- Preceded by: Denver Beanland
- Succeeded by: Scott Emerson

Parliamentary Secretary to the Attorney-General and Minister for Justice and Minister Assisting the Premier in Western Queensland
- In office 24 April 2008 – 5 October 2008
- Premier: Anna Bligh

Parliamentary Secretary to the Minister for Main Roads and Local Government
- In office 13 September 2007 – 24 April 2008
- Premier: Anna Bligh

Parliamentary Secretary to the Minister for Communities, Minister for Disability Services Queensland, Minister for Aboriginal and Torres Strait Islander Partnerships, and Minister for Seniors and Youth
- In office 30 January 2007 – 13 September 2007
- Premier: Peter Beattie

Parliamentary Secretary to the Minister for Communities, Disability Services, Seniors and Youth
- In office 21 September 2006 – 30 January 2007
- Premier: Peter Beattie

Personal details
- Born: Ronan Oliver Lee; 4 January 1976 (age 50) Republic of Ireland
- Party: Greens (since 2008); Labor (2001–2008)
- Education: St Columban's College; St Patrick's College, Cavan; St Teresa's National School
- Occupation: Writer; Academic; Politician
- Website: www.ronanlee.com

Academic background
- Education: Deakin University (PhD); Monash University; University of Queensland (BA)

Academic work
- Institutions: Loughborough University
- Main interests: Genocide; Rohingya; Hate Speech; Myanmar; Asia; Politics
- Notable works: Myanmar’s Rohingya Genocide: Identity, History and Hate Speech

Ronan Oliver Lee (born 4 January 1976) is an Irish Australian former politician and research fellow in the Institute for Media and Creative Industries at Loughborough University London. He was previously a visiting scholar at Queen Mary University of London's International State Crime Initiative. His research focusses on Myanmar, the Rohingya, genocide, and hate speech. He was formerly a political advisor and Labor and later Greens member of the Queensland State Parliament. Lee represented the seat of Indooroopilly since he was first elected as a Labor Party member in 2001.

Lee had a background in environmental activism and joined the Queensland Greens in 2008 citing the Bligh Government's inaction on climate change and environment protection. Since leaving Parliament in 2009 Lee has run his communications and lobbying business and traveled extensively in Myanmar (Burma).

Lee grew up in Ballyjamesduff, County Cavan, Ireland and his family migrated to Brisbane, Australia when he was a teenager. He was educated at St Patrick's College, Cavan, St Columban's College, Caboolture, and the University of Queensland, where he graduated with a Bachelor of Arts degree. Lee has a Master of International Relations from Monash University, writing a thesis titled A Politician, Not an Icon. Aung San Suu Kyi's silence on Myanmar's Muslim Rohingya. Lee has a PhD from Deakin University. His PhD thesis was titled "Myanmar's Rohingya Genocide: Rohingya Perspectives of History and Identity" and addressed the identity, history, and politics of the Rohingya. Lee is the author of Myanmar's Rohingya Genocide: Identity, History and Hate Speech published by Bloomsbury Publishing's IB Tauris imprint.

== Myanmar (Burma) ==
Lee has traveled extensively in Asia and has a particular interest in the politics of Myanmar. He was one of the few westerners to experience Myanmar's 2010 elections and met Aung San Suu Kyi shortly after her release from house arrest. He is currently researching the situation involving the Muslim Rohingya people in Myanmar's western state of Rakhine and tweeted the cover of his Masters of International Relations thesis 'A Politician, Not an Icon. Aung San Suu Kyi's silence on Myanmar's Muslim Rohingya'. Lee's PhD involved research with the Rohingya community in Bangladesh, Myanmar and Thailand and he was frequently published academic articles and op-eds about Myanmar's politics, the Rohingya's human rights, hate speech and genocide. Lee is the author of "Myanmar's Rohingya Genocide: Identity, History and Hate Speech" published by Bloomsbury Publishing's IB Tauris imprint.

== Environment activism ==
Lee has been involved with environment causes since his youth and is best known for his involvement with The Wilderness Society who welcomed his decision to join the Greens.

During his time in Parliament Lee campaigned to end broadscale land clearing in Queensland a practice often involving dragging a heavy chain strung between two bull dozers to remove every tree, contributing to Queensland having the sixth highest rate of land clearing in the world. A ban on most clearing in Queensland came into force in January 2007.

Following the success of the tree clearing campaign Lee shifted focus with a campaign to protect Queensland's remaining wild rivers, the environment issue for which he has been most closely associated.

Sponsoring Parliamentary ePetitions and working with peak environment groups again including The Wilderness Society, the Wildlife Preservation Society of Queensland and the Queensland Conservation Council to promote grassroots campaigns and lobbying of MPs and bureaucrats. Queensland's Wild Rivers Act was passed in 2005 with the first "wild river declarations" in 2007 with protection for Gulf of Carpentaria river systems Settlement Creek, Morning Inlet, and the Gregory and Staaten Rivers, and the waterways of Fraser and Hinchinbrook Islands. Since then the Queensland Government protected river systems on Cape York Peninsula – the Archer, Stewart and Lockhart River Basins and the Wenlock River.

Lee is opposed to nuclear power and campaigned against nuclear power and uranium mining in Queensland. As a Green MP Lee introduced two private member's Bills to Parliament aiming to permanently ban uranium mining and uranium exploration. Both bills received their first reading in parliament but lapsed once the 2009 Queensland election was announced and the parliament dissolved.

== Parliamentary career ==
In 2001, Lee obtained preselection for the seat of Indooroopilly and surprised many by defeating former Queensland Liberal Leader Denver Beanland in the state elections that year. The surprise result was mainly due to two factors: the huge margin that re-elected the Beattie Labor Government and the strong grass-roots campaign employed by Lee. In 2003, Lee made a parliamentary speech which noted Bengali language was spoken by hundreds of millions of people worldwide and advocated the teaching of Bengali language in Queensland schools. In 2004, Lee was re-elected to his seat and during this term he campaigned against the Labor government's asset sales including the privatisation of parts of Queensland's electricity industry. In 2006, he won a third parliamentary term when he defeated the Liberal Party's Peter Turner. During this term, Lee was made a Parliamentary Secretary.

In 2008 Lee announced that he had resigned from the ALP and defected to the Greens, becoming their first Queensland MP. Lee subsequently became one of the first MPs in Queensland to publicly support same-sex marriage. As the Greens' parliamentary leader, Lee campaigned at the election for a moratorium on shale oil mining in the Great Barrier Reef, support for renewable energy, the construction of light rail in Brisbane instead of new road construction, and free public transport for young people and pensioners.

In the 2009 election, Lee achieved a vote share of 25.93 per cent, a record vote for a Greens candidate, but failed to retain his seat, losing to LNP candidate Scott Emerson.

== Parliamentary Secretary ==
Following the 2006 election Premier Peter Beattie appointed Lee Parliamentary Secretary to the Minister for Communities, Disability Services, Aboriginal and Torres Strait Islander Partnerships, Seniors and Youth. Lee's main focus was on youth policy arguing for a greater role for young people in government decision making and in favour of improved public transport services at night and on weekends.

With Beattie's retirement in 2007, Premier Bligh appointed Lee Parliamentary Secretary to the Minister for Main Roads and Local Government.

In this role Lee advocated for greatly increased spending on bikeways and public transport, proposing a dramatic expansion of Brisbane's CityCat ferry fleet and a new rail line to Brisbane's western suburbs. Funding for these projects he argued should come at the expense of new highway construction.

In 2008 Bligh moved Lee to the newly created role of Parliamentary Secretary to the Attorney-General and Minister for Justice and Minister Assisting the Premier in Western Queensland where he was to focus on consumer protection and organising the state's No Interest Loans Scheme for low income earners. In this role Lee was critical of broad reach of the State's anti-public nuisance laws which he said contributed to the controversial and violent arrest of a homeless pensioner.

Parliament of Queensland
Preceded by Denver Beanland	Member for Indooroopilly; 2001–2009	Succeeded by Scott Emerson
