= Electoral district of Indooroopilly =

Indooroopilly Queensland—Legislative Assembly
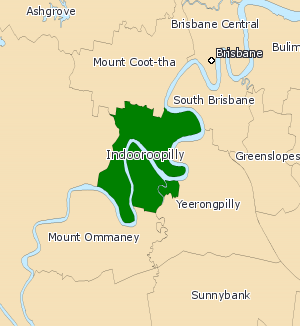
- Indooroopilly (2008–2017)
- State: Queensland
- Dates current: 1992–2017
- Namesake: Indooroopilly
- Electors: 29,646 (2015)
- Area: 27 km^{2} (10.4 sq mi)
- Coordinates: 27°31′S 152°59′E

Indooroopilly was an electoral district of the Legislative Assembly in the Australian state of Queensland from 1992 to 2017.

The district was based in the western suburbs of Brisbane, and straddled both sides of the Brisbane River. It was named for the suburb of Indooroopilly and also included the suburbs of Chelmer, Fig Tree Pocket, Graceville, Sherwood, St Lucia and Taringa. After a redistribution in 2008 it included parts of Tennyson. It was first created for the 1992 election.

Indooroopilly was a marginal seat, having been won narrowly by Labor in three elections between 2001 and 2006. On 5 October 2008, sitting member Ronan Lee resigned from the Labor Party and defected to the Queensland Greens. Lee was defeated at the 2009 election by Liberal National candidate Scott Emerson.

Indooroopilly was abolished in a boundary redistribution for the 2017 state election. It was replaced by the district of Maiwar.

== Members for Indooroopilly ==
Member	Party	Term
Denver Beanland	Liberal	1992–2001
Ronan Lee	Labor	2001–2008
Ronan Lee	Greens	2008–2009
Scott Emerson	Liberal National	2009–2017
