= Queensland Greens =

- Convenor: Gemmia Burden
- Founded: 22 September 1991; 35 years ago
- Headquarters: Milton, Brisbane, South East Queensland
- Youth wing: Queensland Young Greens
- Ideology: Green politics; Progressivism; Left-wing populism
- Political position: Centre-left to left-wing
- National affiliation: Australian Greens
- Colours: Green
- House of Representatives: 1 / 30 (Queensland seats)
- Senate: 2 / 12 (Queensland seats)
- Legislative Assembly: 1 / 93
- Brisbane City Council: 2 / 26
- Local government: 2 / 562

Website
- greens.org.au/qld

The Queensland Greens is a Green party in Queensland, Australia, and a state member of the Australian Greens. The party is currently represented in all three levels of government, by Larissa Waters and Penny Allman-Payne in the federal Senate; Elizabeth Watson-Brown in the House of Representatives; Michael Berkman in the state Legislative Assembly; and Trina Massey and Seal Chong Wah in Brisbane City Council.

== History ==
The Greens were first founded in Queensland as the Brisbane Green Party in 1984, contesting four wards and for mayor in the 1985 Brisbane City Council elections. Following the collapse of the Brisbane Greens in 1986, the party began to re-form as the Queensland Greens under a national initiative, today's Australian Greens. The Queensland Greens were officially founded as a political party on 22 September 1991 as part of the national Greens alliance.

=== Federal Parliament ===
Queensland Greens co-founder Drew Hutton ran in the 1993, 1998 and 2004 federal elections as the party's lead Senate candidate. In 2004 the party received 5.4 per cent of the Senate vote, with Hutton narrowly losing the race for the final two Senate seats to Coalition candidates Barnaby Joyce and Russell Trood. This gave the Howard government a Senate majority and control of both parliamentary houses.

The party's Senate vote continued to grow in subsequent elections, reaching a high-water mark of 12.76 per cent at the 2010 federal election, which resulted in Larissa Waters becoming the first Greens representative elected to office in Queensland. Waters was re-elected to a three-year term in the 2016 election, but resigned in 2017 after discovering she held dual Canadian citizenship. The High Court ruled that her election was therefore invalid, and appointed Andrew Bartlett, convenor of the Queensland Greens and former leader of the Australian Democrats, as her successor in the Senate. A year later, Bartlett resigned his Senate seat to run for the lower house seat of Brisbane, allowing Waters to return as a Senator. While Waters was re-elected to the Senate in the 2019 election, Bartlett was unsuccessful in Brisbane, despite gaining a 3 per cent swing towards him.

The 2022 election was a major success for the Queensland Greens, as they went from having no federal lower house representatives to three, with Max Chandler-Mather winning in Griffith, Elizabeth Watson-Brown in Ryan, and Stephen Bates in Brisbane. In addition, Waters was joined by a second Queensland Greens Senator, Penny Allman-Payne. This string of victories was dubbed a "Greenslide" by federal party leader Adam Bandt, while some media commentators nicknamed the state "Greensland" in their coverage of the results.

=== Queensland Parliament ===
The Queensland Greens have received steadily increasing support in state elections, increasing their vote from 2.5 per cent at the 2001 election to 9 per cent in the 2020 election.

The party gained its first state parliamentary representative in 2008 when the Member for Indooroopilly, Ronan Lee, defected to the Greens from the Labor Party. Lee ascribed his move to the Greens to his dissatisfaction with the Bligh government's environmental policies. Responding to Lee's change of party, Labor's Minister for Climate Change and Sustainability Andrew McNamara rejected his claims, calling the Bligh government "the greenest government that this state has ever had". Australian Greens leader Bob Brown praised Lee's decision saying, "Ronan Lee's move will give the Queensland Parliament a strong and intelligent Greens advocate to lead debate on the best social and economic way forward in an age of environmental and economic crisis... Now there will be a responsible voice free to challenge those old Labor and National-Liberal policies which, for example threaten the death of the Great Barrier Reef and tens of thousands of jobs dependent on it within a generation". However, Lee lost his seat to LNP candidate Scott Emerson at the 2009 election.

In the 2017 state election, the Queensland Greens achieved their first ever state electoral victory. Following the abolition of the seats of Mt Coot-tha and Indooroopilly, environmental lawyer Michael Berkman narrowly won the newly-formed seat of Maiwar from the shadow treasurer Scott Emerson, a former cabinet member in the Newman government, who had defeated Ronan Lee in Indooroopilly eight years earlier.

In the 2020 state election, the Greens gained an additional seat in parliament, bringing their total to two. While Berkman retained his seat of Maiwar, Amy MacMahon won the seat of South Brisbane from Labor's former deputy premier Jackie Trad. The Greens also had significant success in Cooper, with candidate Katinka Winston-Allom receiving 30 per cent of first preference votes, but losing to Labor's Jonty Bush after preferences were allocated.

=== Local government ===
Greens candidate Jonathan Sriranganathan (then known as Sri) was elected to represent The Gabba Ward in Brisbane City Council at the March 2016 local government elections. He achieved a primary vote of 31.72%, a positive swing of approximately 13.8%. Sriranganathan finished in second place behind LNP candidate Sean Jacobs, but was able to win on mostly Labor preferences. Sriranganathan is the first Greens candidate to win a seat in local government anywhere in Queensland.

At the 2020 Brisbane City Council election, the Greens were the only party to have a swing in their favour, at 3.3%. Jonathan Sriranganathan retained his ward with a 12.4% swing in primary vote and an overall two-party preferred vote of 65.5%. The Greens additionally entered the two-party preferred vote in 4 other wards where the party came close to unseating the Liberal candidates, including Central (45.2%), Paddington (49.6%), Pullenvale (40.6%) and Walter Taylor (47.7%). 21 out of the 26 wards registered swings towards the Greens.

In the 2024 Brisbane City Council election, candidate Seal Chong Wah gained the additional ward of Paddington for the Greens with a primary vote of 39.41%. They also achieved swings of 4.7% and 8.0% in Walter Taylor and Central Ward respectively, bringing their primary vote to 39.6% in Walter Taylor and 35.5% in Central. Overall city-wide, they achieved a swing of 5.2% averaging a primary vote of 23% across Brisbane's wards. Jonathan Sriranganathan, former councillor for The Gabba stood as the Mayoral candidate achieving a swing of 4.1% with a primary vote of 19.5%. The Greens performance indicates a strengthening presence in Brisbane's political scene, particularly in the western and inner-city suburbs.

== Leaders ==
The Queensland Greens do not currently have a parliamentary leader. The Queensland Greens constitution provides for the election of the leadership by a ballot of all party members when the party has three or more members elected to the Queensland Legislative Assembly.

== Branches ==
Members of the party are allocated to a local branch that is responsible for a range of state electorates in their respective geographic area. While the branches are responsible for the electorates, most members reside in the main regional towns or cities of the branch. Branches are the key decision making body in the grassroots democracy model, and are a place where members can debate and bring changes to policy, organise events, stand for election and support campaigns.

Geographic Area	Name	State electorates	Biggest town/city/suburb	Highest Greens vote (2024 election)
Far North Queensland	Far North Queensland	Barron River, Cairns, Cook, Mulgrave	Cairns	11.2% in Cairns
Far North Queensland	Northern Queensland	Hill, Hinchinbrook, Traeger	Atherton Tablelands	6.7% in Hill
North Queensland	Tropical Coast	Townsville, Mundingburra, Thuringowa, Burdekin, Mackay, Whitsunday	Townsville	8.1% in Townsville
Central Queensland	Keppel	Rockhampton, Mirani	Rockhampton	3.8% in Rockhampton
Central Queensland	Capricorn Coast	Keppel	Yeppoon	4.7% in Keppel
Central Queensland	Gladstone and Callide	Gladstone, Callide, Bundaberg, Burnett, Hervey Bay	Bundaberg	5.5% in Gladstone
Sunshine Coast	Noosa, Gympie and Maryborough	Noosa, Gympie, Maryborough	Noosa	8% in Gympie
Sunshine Coast	Sunshine Coast-Maroochy	Buderim, Maroochydore, Nicklin, Ninderry	Maroochydore	11.6% in Buderim
Sunshine Coast	Maleny	Glass House	Maleny	12% in Glass House
Sunshine Coast	Caloundra	Caloundra, Kawana	Caloundra	9.5% in Kawana
Darling Downs	Toowoomba and Western Queensland	Condamine, Gregory, Nanango, Southern Downs, Toowoomba North, Toowoomba South, Warrego	Toowoomba	7.4% in Toowoomba North
Ipswich	Ipswich-Lockyer	Bundamba, Ipswich, Ipswich West, Lockyer	Ipswich	10.7% in Ipswich
Greater Brisbane	Bayside	Chatsworth, Lytton	Carindale	11.3% in Lytton
Greater Brisbane	Bulimba	Bulimba	Morningside	16.5% in Bulimba
Greater Brisbane	Caboolture	Morayfield, Pumicestone	Morayfield	6.8% in Morayfield
Greater Brisbane	Clayfield	Clayfield	Clayfield	17.5% in Clayfield
Greater Brisbane	Cooper	Cooper	Paddington	25.5% in Cooper
Greater Brisbane	Greenslopes	Greenslopes, Mansfield	Mansfield	26.4% in Greenslopes
Greater Brisbane	Karawatha	Algester, Stretton	Calamvale	14.2% in Stretton
Greater Brisbane	Logan	Logan, MacAlister, Springwood, Waterford, Woodridge	Beenleigh	8.4% in Springwood
Greater Brisbane	Maiwar	Maiwar	Indooroopilly	34% in Maiwar
Greater Brisbane	North Brisbane	Stafford, McConnel	Brisbane CBD	25.2% in McConnel
Greater Brisbane	North Pine	Bancroft, Kurwongbah, Murrumba, Redcliffe	Mango Hill	8% in Kurwongbah
Greater Brisbane	Pine Rivers	Everton, Ferny Grove, Pine Rivers	Strathpine	10.3% in Ferny Grove
Greater Brisbane	Redlands	Capalaba, Oodgeroo, Redlands	Cleveland	8.1% in Oodgeroo
Greater Brisbane	Sandgate	Aspley, Nudgee, Sandgate	Aspley	9.9% in Sandgate
Greater Brisbane	Scenic Rim	Scenic Rim	Beaudesert	9.1% in Scenic Rim
Greater Brisbane	South Brisbane	South Brisbane	West End	34.7% in South Brisbane
Greater Brisbane	South-West Brisbane	Inala, Jordan, Mount Ommaney	Forest Lake	8.4% in Mount Ommaney
Greater Brisbane	West Brisbane	Moggill	Bellbowrie	20.5% in Moggill
Greater Brisbane	Yeerongpilly	Miller, Toohey	Salisbury	23.6% in Miller
Gold Coast	Gold Coast North	Bonney, Broadwater, Coomera, Gaven, Theodore	Coomera	8.9% in Broadwater
Gold Coast	Gold Coast South	Burleigh, Currumbin, Mermaid Beach, Mudgeeraba, Southport, Surfers Paradise	Southport	8.7% in Southport

== Queensland Young Greens ==
Queensland Young Greens logo

The Queensland Young Greens are the youth wing of the Queensland Greens and is open to all members under the age of 26 across the state of Queensland. The Young Greens' main focus is on election campaigning, skills training, policy development, and hosting a number of different social events. The youth wing maintains a grassroots approach in organising members. The youth wing also shares the same policies as the Queensland Greens based around the four guiding principles of non-violence, social justice, grass-roots democracy and ecological sustainability.

In 2025, two Queensland Young Greens representatives were elected to the University of Queensland Union, a third was won at a by-election, and this grew to 4 in 2026. The Queensland Young Greens run campus groups at the University of Queensland, Griffith University, Queensland University of Technology, and the University of Sunshine Coast.

== Electoral history ==
=== Queensland ===
Election	Legislative Assembly of Queensland				
Election	Votes	%	+/–	Seats	+/–
1995	51,748	2.87%	-	0 / 89	Steady
1998	45,709	2.36%	▼0.51%	0 / 89	Steady
2001	51,630	2.51%	▲0.15%	0 / 89	Steady
2004	145,522	6.76%	▲4.25%	0 / 89	Steady
2006	175,798	7.99%	▲1.23%	0 / 89	Steady
2009	198,475	8.37%	▲0.38%	0 / 89	Steady
2012	184,147	7.53%	▼0.84%	0 / 89	Steady
2015	221,157	8.43%	▲0.90%	0 / 89	Steady
2017	270,263	10.00%	▲1.57%	1 / 93	▲1
2020	271,514	9.47%	▼0.53%	2 / 93	▲1
2024	307,178	9.89%	▲0.42%	1 / 93	▼1

=== Federal ===
Election	Queensland House seats				Queensland Senate seats				
Election	Votes	%	Seats	+/–	Votes	%	Seats won	Total seats	+/–
1993	-	-	0 / 25		59,303	3.2	0 / 6	0 / 12	
1996	-	-	0 / 26	Steady	46,285	2.4	0 / 6	0 / 12	Steady
1998	47,440	2.4	0 / 28	Steady	42,264	2.1	0 / 6	0 / 12	Steady
2001	73,465	3.49	0 / 28	Steady	71,102	3.31	0 / 6	0 / 12	Steady
2004	111,314	5.06	0 / 28	Steady	122,393	5.40	0 / 6	0 / 12	Steady
2007	133,938	5.63	0 / 29	Steady	177,063	7.32	0 / 6	0 / 12	Steady
2010	260,471	10.92	0 / 30	Steady	312,804	12.76	1 / 6	1 / 12	▲1
2013	156,880	6.22	0 / 30	Steady	158,150	6.04	0 / 6	1 / 12	Steady
2016	235,887	8.83	0 / 30	Steady	188,323	6.92	1 / 12	1 / 12	Steady
2019	292,061	10.32	0 / 30	Steady	288,320	9.94	1 / 6	1 / 12	Steady
2022	382,900	12.94	3 / 30	▲3	373,460	12.39	1 / 6	2 / 12	▲1
2025	370,340	11.80	1 / 30	▼2	335,087	10.40	1 / 6	2 / 12	Steady

== Members of Parliament ==
=== Federal Parliament ===
==== House of Representatives ====
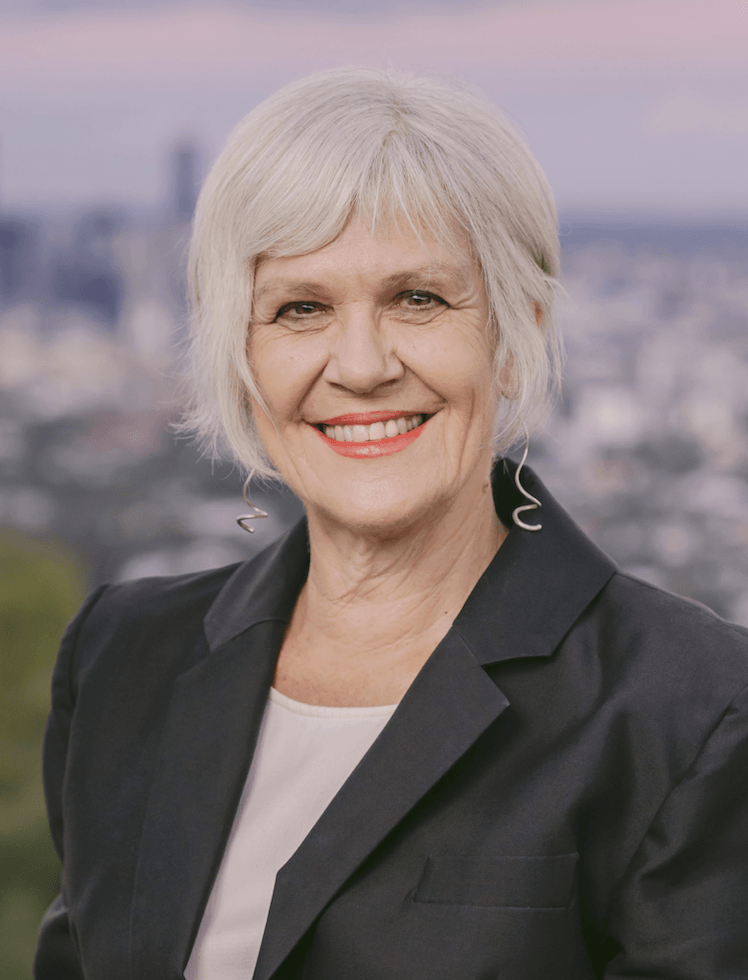
Elizabeth Watson-Brown MP for Ryan (2022–present)

==== Senate ====
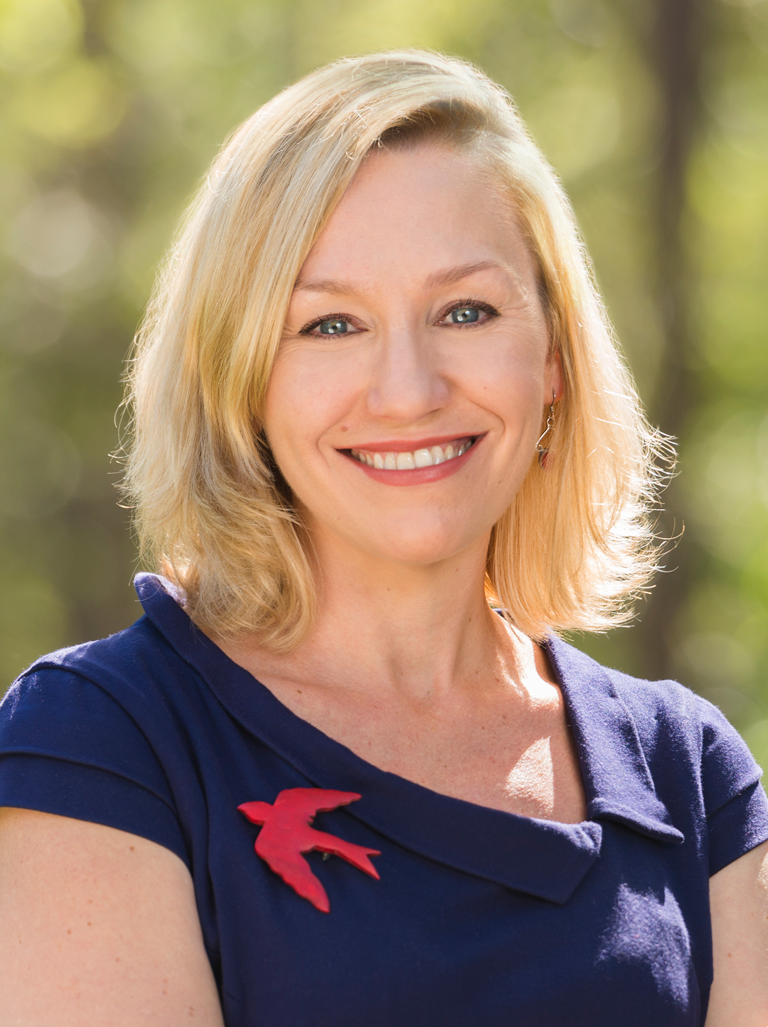
Senator Larissa Waters (2011–2017; 2018–present)

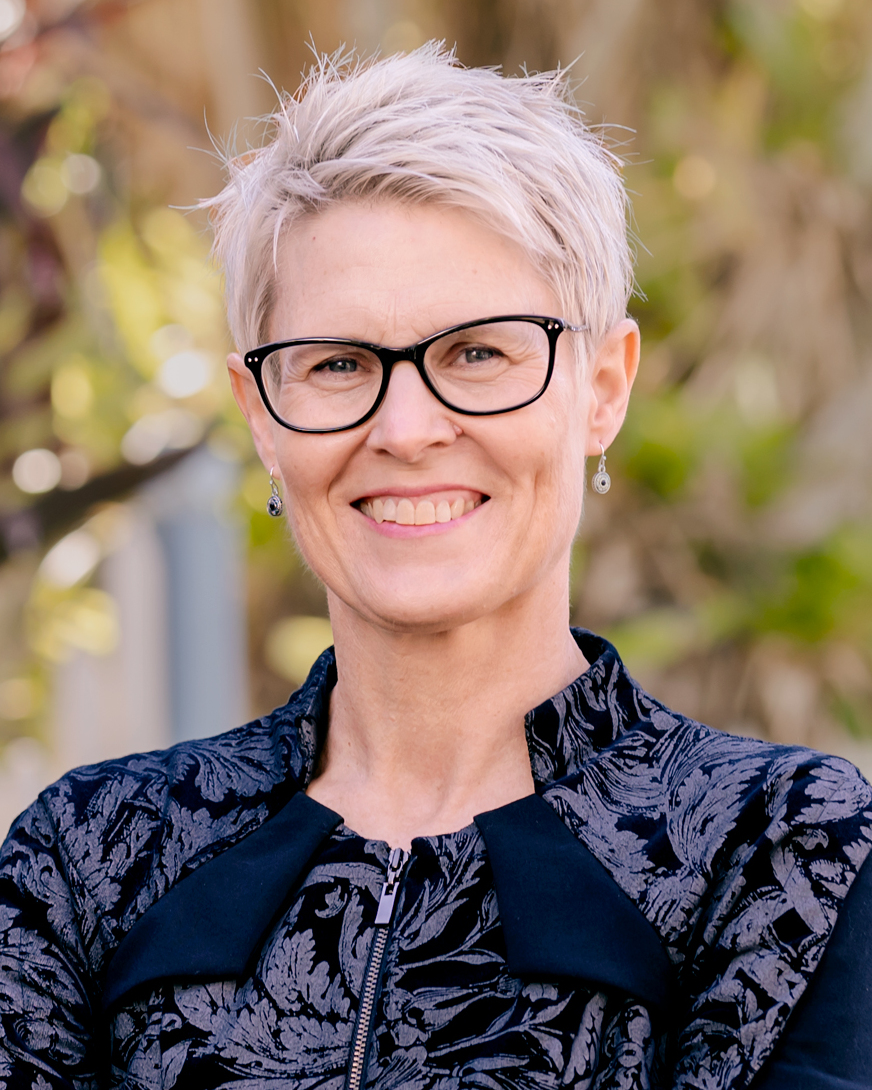
Senator Penny Allman-Payne (2022–present)

==== Former ====
- Senator Andrew Bartlett (2017–2018)
- Stephen Bates, MP for Brisbane (2022–2025)
- Max Chandler-Mather, MP for Griffith (2022–2025)

=== State Parliament ===
Michael Berkman MP for Maiwar (2017–present)

==== Former ====
- Ronan Lee, MP for Indooroopilly (2008–2009 (Note: Lee sat from 2001 to 2008 as a Labor Party MP before defecting to the Greens.))
- Amy MacMahon, MP for South Brisbane (2020–2024)

== Councillors ==
=== Brisbane City Council ===
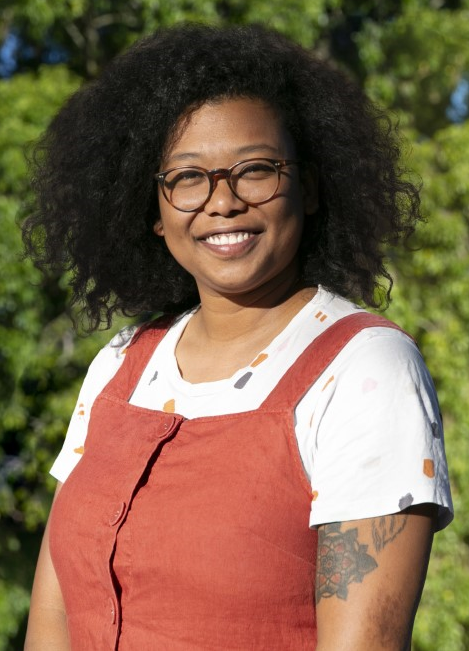
Cr Trina Massey, The Gabba (2023–present)

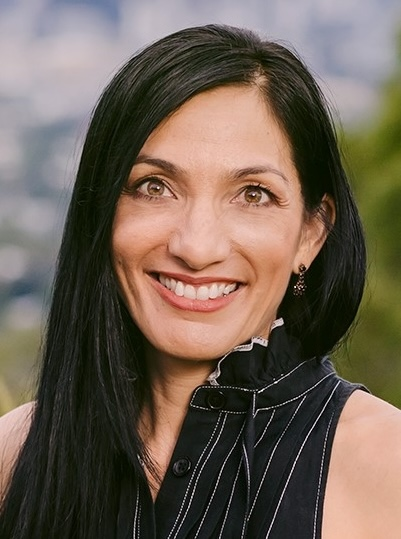
Cr Seal Chong Wah Paddington (2024–present)

==== Former ====
- Cr Jonathan Sriranganathan, The Gabba (2016–2023)
