= Electoral district of Maiwar =

State electoral district of Queensland, Australia

Maiwar Queensland—Legislative Assembly
- Map of Maiwar, 2017
- State: Queensland
- Dates current: 2017–present
- MP: Michael Berkman
- Party: Greens
- Namesake: Indigenous name of the Brisbane River
- Electors: 38,663 (2020)
- Area: 38 km^{2} (14.7 sq mi)
- Demographic: Inner-metropolitan
- Coordinates: 27.4942°S 152.9756°E
Electorates around Maiwar:
Moggill	Cooper	Cooper
Moggill	Maiwar	South Brisbane
Mount Ommaney	Miller	Miller

Maiwar is an electoral district of the Legislative Assembly in the Australian state of Queensland, incorporating the inner western suburbs of Brisbane. It was created in the 2017 redistribution, and was first contested at the 2017 Queensland state election. The name of the electorate is stated by the government as being based on an Aboriginal name for the Brisbane River, however it is not the name that the Turrbal people who lived in the Brisbane region had for the river. The Brisbane River forms the southern boundary of the electorate.

It largely replaces areas of the abolished districts of Mount Coot-tha and Indooroopilly, north of the Brisbane River. Maiwar consists of the suburbs of Mount Coot-tha, Bardon, Auchenflower, Toowong, Taringa, Indooroopilly, St Lucia and Fig Tree Pocket.

At its creation, Maiwar was estimated to be a marginal seat for the Liberal National Party with a margin of 3.0%. The seat was won by Michael Berkman of the Queensland Greens in the 2017 Queensland state election.

After the redistribution set to come into effect at the 2028 Queensland State Election, the electoral district is set to be renamed "Indooroopilly."

== Members for Maiwar ==
Image	Member	Party	Term	Notes
	Michael Berkman (1981–)	Greens	25 November 2017 – present	Incumbent

== Election results ==
2024 Queensland state election: Maiwar
Party	Candidate	Votes	%	±%
Liberal National	Natasha Winters	13,676	37.70	+0.50
Greens	Michael Berkman	12,319	33.96	−7.44
Labor	Susan Irvine	9,160	25.25	+6.75
One Nation	Grant Spork	1,119	3.09	+1.69
Total formal votes		36,274	98.22	−0.41
Informal votes		658	1.78	+0.41
Turnout		36,932	90.84	+0.39
Two-candidate-preferred result
Greens	Michael Berkman	19,382	53.43	−2.87
Liberal National	Natasha Winters	16,892	46.57	+2.87
Greens hold		Swing	−2.87	

== See also ==
- Electoral districts of Queensland
- Members of the Queensland Legislative Assembly by year
- Category:Members of the Queensland Legislative Assembly by name
