= Electoral results for the district of Toowoomba South =

Queensland, Australia, district election results

This is a list of electoral results for the electoral district of Toowoomba South in Queensland state elections.

== Members for Toowoomba South ==
| Member | Party | Term |
|---|---|---|
| Peter Wood | Labor | 1972–1974 |
| John Warner | Country | 1974–1974 |
| John Warner | National | 1974–1986 |
| Clive Berghofer | National | 1986–1991 |
| Mike Horan | National | 1991–2008 |
| Mike Horan | Liberal National | 2008–2012 |
| John McVeigh | Liberal National | 2012–2016 |
| David Janetzki | Liberal National | 2016–present |

== Election results ==
=== Elections in the 2020s ===
2024 Queensland state election: Toowoomba South
| Party | Candidate | Votes | % | ±% |
|---|---|---|---|---|
| Liberal National | David Janetzki | 18,566 | 53.84 | +2.54 |
| Labor | Susan Krause | 8,758 | 25.40 | −5.50 |
| Greens | Wren Beith | 2,353 | 6.82 | +0.02 |
| One Nation | Eaton Haines | 1,847 | 5.36 | −2.26 |
| Family First | Alexandra Todd | 1,590 | 4.61 | +4.61 |
| Legalise Cannabis | Ingrid Weber | 1,371 | 3.97 | +3.97 |
| Total formal votes | | 34,485 | 96.6 | |
| Informal votes | | 1,224 | 3.4 | |
| Turnout | | 35,709 | 89.30 | |
Two-party-preferred result
| Liberal National | David Janetzki | 21,723 | 62.99 | +2.79 |
| Labor | Susan Krause | 12,762 | 37.01 | −2.79 |
| Liberal National hold | | Swing | +2.79 | |

2020 Queensland state election: Toowoomba South
| Party | Candidate | Votes | % | ±% |
|---|---|---|---|---|
| Liberal National | David Janetzki | 16,689 | 51.33 | +4.83 |
| Labor | Susan Krause | 10,028 | 30.84 | +3.91 |
| One Nation | Dylan Kozlowski | 2,502 | 7.70 | −8.77 |
| Greens | Thomas Coyne | 2,232 | 6.87 | −0.34 |
| Independent | Rob Berry | 570 | 1.75 | −1.13 |
| United Australia | Allan Turner | 490 | 1.51 | +1.51 |
| Total formal votes | | 32,511 | 97.22 | +0.96 |
| Informal votes | | 929 | 2.78 | −0.96 |
| Turnout | | 33,440 | 88.58 | −0.33 |
Two-party-preferred result
| Liberal National | David Janetzki | 19,579 | 60.22 | +0.24 |
| Labor | Susan Krause | 12,932 | 39.78 | −0.24 |
| Liberal National hold | | Swing | +0.24 | |

=== Elections in the 2010s ===
2017 Queensland state election: Toowoomba South
| Party | Candidate | Votes | % | ±% |
|---|---|---|---|---|
| Liberal National | David Janetzki | 14,893 | 46.5 | −8.1 |
| Labor | Susan Krause | 8,626 | 26.9 | −7.9 |
| One Nation | Jeremy Scamp | 5,273 | 16.5 | +16.5 |
| Greens | Alyce Nelligan | 2,308 | 7.2 | −2.5 |
| Independent | Rob Berry | 923 | 2.9 | +2.9 |
| Total formal votes | | 32,023 | 96.3 | −1.3 |
| Informal votes | | 1,243 | 3.7 | +1.3 |
| Turnout | | 33,266 | 88.9 | −1.8 |
Two-party-preferred result
| Liberal National | David Janetzki | 19,208 | 60.0 | +1.6 |
| Labor | Susan Krause | 12,815 | 40.0 | −1.6 |
| Liberal National hold | | Swing | +1.6 | |

2016 Toowoomba South state by-election
| Party | Candidate | Votes | % | ±% |
|---|---|---|---|---|
| Liberal National | David Janetzki | 13,005 | 46.37 | −8.96 |
| Independent | Di Thorley | 9,827 | 35.04 | +35.04 |
| Family First | Alexandra Todd | 2,019 | 7.20 | +7.20 |
| Greens | Ken Gover | 1,519 | 5.42 | −4.44 |
| Katter's Australian | Ken Elliott | 1,188 | 4.24 | +4.24 |
| Independent | Rob Berry | 486 | 1.73 | +1.73 |
| Total formal votes | | 28,044 | 96.76 | −0.79 |
| Informal votes | | 940 | 3.24 | +0.79 |
| Turnout | | 28,984 | 83.49 | −8.80 |
Two-candidate-preferred result
| Liberal National | David Janetzki | 15,591 | 55.59 | −10.07 |
| Independent | Di Thorley | 12,453 | 44.41 | +44.41 |
| Liberal National hold | | Swing | −10.07 | |

2015 Queensland state election: Toowoomba South
| Party | Candidate | Votes | % | ±% |
|---|---|---|---|---|
| Liberal National | John McVeigh | 16,851 | 55.33 | −3.20 |
| Labor | Graham Storey | 10,601 | 34.81 | +13.78 |
| Greens | Anne Waters | 3,003 | 9.86 | +4.38 |
| Total formal votes | | 30,455 | 97.54 | −0.40 |
| Informal votes | | 767 | 2.46 | +0.40 |
| Turnout | | 31,222 | 90.99 | −0.95 |
Two-party-preferred result
| Liberal National | John McVeigh | 17,216 | 58.89 | −12.73 |
| Labor | Graham Storey | 12,018 | 41.11 | +12.73 |
| Liberal National hold | | Swing | −12.73 | |

2012 Queensland state election: Toowoomba South
| Party | Candidate | Votes | % | ±% |
|---|---|---|---|---|
| Liberal National | John McVeigh | 17,283 | 58.53 | +5.04 |
| Labor | Sam McFarlane | 6,208 | 21.03 | −16.40 |
| Katter's Australian | David Curless | 3,520 | 11.92 | +11.92 |
| Greens | Trevor Smith | 1,619 | 5.48 | +0.86 |
| Independent | Charlene Phillips | 896 | 3.03 | +3.03 |
| Total formal votes | | 29,526 | 97.95 | −0.31 |
| Informal votes | | 619 | 2.05 | +0.31 |
| Turnout | | 30,145 | 91.94 | +0.06 |
Two-party-preferred result
| Liberal National | John McVeigh | 18,794 | 71.62 | +13.40 |
| Labor | Sam McFarlane | 7,448 | 28.38 | −13.40 |
| Liberal National hold | | Swing | +13.40 | |

=== Elections in the 2000s ===
2009 Queensland state election: Toowoomba South
| Party | Candidate | Votes | % | ±% |
|---|---|---|---|---|
| Liberal National | Mike Horan | 15,708 | 53.5 | +1.9 |
| Labor | Dan Toombs | 10,992 | 37.4 | +4.9 |
| Greens | Barnaby Heaton | 1,357 | 4.6 | −1.5 |
| Independent | Peter Pyke | 1,308 | 4.5 | +4.5 |
| Total formal votes | | 29,365 | 98.2 | |
| Informal votes | | 519 | 1.8 | |
| Turnout | | 29,884 | 91.9 | |
Two-party-preferred result
| Liberal National | Mike Horan | 16,300 | 58.2 | −3.0 |
| Labor | Dan Toombs | 11,699 | 41.8 | +3.0 |
| Liberal National hold | | Swing | −3.0 | |

2006 Queensland state election: Toowoomba South
| Party | Candidate | Votes | % | ±% |
|---|---|---|---|---|
| National | Mike Horan | 12,012 | 50.6 | −2.3 |
| Labor | Frank Burke | 8,043 | 33.9 | +1.3 |
| Family First | Peter Hicks | 1,596 | 6.7 | +6.7 |
| Greens | Christine Tuppurainen | 1,482 | 6.2 | −0.8 |
| Independent | Grahame Volker | 609 | 2.6 | +2.6 |
| Total formal votes | | 23,742 | 98.1 | −0.2 |
| Informal votes | | 448 | 1.9 | +0.2 |
| Turnout | | 24,190 | 91.6 | −0.7 |
Two-party-preferred result
| National | Mike Horan | 13,177 | 59.8 | −1.7 |
| Labor | Frank Burke | 8,863 | 40.2 | +1.7 |
| National hold | | Swing | −1.7 | |

2004 Queensland state election: Toowoomba South
| Party | Candidate | Votes | % | ±% |
|---|---|---|---|---|
| National | Mike Horan | 12,229 | 52.9 | +9.1 |
| Labor | Andrew Irvine | 7,536 | 32.6 | +0.1 |
| One Nation | Dennis Kronk | 1,762 | 7.6 | −12.4 |
| Greens | Karey Harrison | 1,608 | 7.0 | +7.0 |
| Total formal votes | | 23,135 | 98.3 | −0.1 |
| Informal votes | | 404 | 1.7 | +0.1 |
| Turnout | | 23,539 | 92.3 | −0.2 |
Two-party-preferred result
| National | Mike Horan | 13,364 | 61.5 | +3.6 |
| Labor | Andrew Irvine | 8,369 | 38.5 | −3.6 |
| National hold | | Swing | +3.6 | |

2001 Queensland state election: Toowoomba South
| Party | Candidate | Votes | % | ±% |
|---|---|---|---|---|
| National | Mike Horan | 10,028 | 43.8 | −2.4 |
| Labor | Peter Shooter | 7,439 | 32.5 | +5.1 |
| One Nation | David Hoy | 4,577 | 20.0 | −4.3 |
| Independent | Hugh Wilson | 857 | 3.7 | +3.7 |
| Total formal votes | | 22,901 | 98.4 | |
| Informal votes | | 374 | 1.6 | |
| Turnout | | 23,275 | 92.5 | |
Two-party-preferred result
| National | Mike Horan | 11,319 | 57.9 | −5.8 |
| Labor | Peter Shooter | 8,216 | 42.1 | +5.8 |
| National hold | | Swing | −5.8 | |

=== Elections in the 1990s ===
1998 Queensland state election: Toowoomba South
| Party | Candidate | Votes | % | ±% |
|---|---|---|---|---|
| National | Mike Horan | 9,328 | 46.5 | −19.8 |
| Labor | Andrew Isfree | 5,615 | 28.0 | −5.7 |
| One Nation | Darryl Shoesmith | 4,748 | 23.7 | +23.7 |
| Reform | Andrew Chambers | 357 | 1.8 | +1.8 |
| Total formal votes | | 20,048 | 98.9 | +0.4 |
| Informal votes | | 226 | 1.1 | −0.4 |
| Turnout | | 20,274 | 93.5 | +1.6 |
Two-party-preferred result
| National | Mike Horan | 11,627 | 63.4 | −2.9 |
| Labor | Andrew Isfree | 6,725 | 36.6 | +2.9 |
| National hold | | Swing | −2.9 | |

1995 Queensland state election: Toowoomba South
| Party | Candidate | Votes | % | ±% |
|---|---|---|---|---|
| National | Mike Horan | 13,134 | 66.3 | +5.1 |
| Labor | Matt Russell | 6,681 | 33.7 | −5.1 |
| Total formal votes | | 19,815 | 98.4 | +0.4 |
| Informal votes | | 313 | 1.6 | −0.4 |
| Turnout | | 20,128 | 91.9 | |
| National hold | | Swing | +5.1 | |

1992 Queensland state election: Toowoomba South
| Party | Candidate | Votes | % | ±% |
|---|---|---|---|---|
| National | Mike Horan | 12,681 | 61.2 | +22.0 |
| Labor | Con Carlyon | 8,047 | 38.8 | +3.5 |
| Total formal votes | | 20,728 | 98.0 | |
| Informal votes | | 421 | 2.0 | |
| Turnout | | 21,149 | 92.6 | |
| National hold | | Swing | +1.8 | |

1991 Toowoomba South state by-election
| Party | Candidate | Votes | % | ±% |
|---|---|---|---|---|
| National | Mike Horan | 7,707 | 39.2 | −1.9 |
| Independent Labor | Des McGovern | 6,146 | 31.3 | +31.3 |
| Liberal | Neville Stewart | 4,478 | 22.8 | +0.5 |
| New Country | L.A. Kruger | 856 | 4.4 | +4.4 |
| Independent | Vincent Burke | 455 | 2.3 | +2.3 |
| Total formal votes | | 19,642 | 97.7 | +0.3 |
| Informal votes | | 463 | 2.3 | −0.3 |
| Turnout | | 20,105 | 86.7 | −6.1 |
Two-candidate-preferred result
| National | Mike Horan | 12,374 | 63.0 | +3.9 |
| Independent Labor | Des McGovern | 7,268 | 37.0 | +37.0 |
| National hold | | Swing | +3.9 | |

=== Elections in the 1980s ===
1989 Queensland state election: Toowoomba South
| Party | Candidate | Votes | % | ±% |
|---|---|---|---|---|
| National | Clive Berghofer | 8,046 | 41.1 | −6.5 |
| Labor | Bill Buchanan | 7,179 | 36.7 | +13.3 |
| Liberal | John Gouldson | 4,357 | 22.3 | +3.6 |
| Total formal votes | | 19,582 | 97.4 | −1.0 |
| Informal votes | | 514 | 2.6 | +1.0 |
| Turnout | | 20,096 | 92.8 | +0.6 |
Two-party-preferred result
| National | Clive Berghofer | 11,569 | 59.1 | −6.7 |
| Labor | Bill Buchanan | 8,013 | 40.9 | +6.7 |
| National hold | | Swing | −6.7 | |

1986 Queensland state election: Toowoomba South
| Party | Candidate | Votes | % | ±% |
|---|---|---|---|---|
| National | Clive Berghofer | 8,401 | 47.6 | −4.4 |
| Labor | Neville Green | 4,129 | 23.4 | −14.3 |
| Liberal | John Gouldson | 3,301 | 18.7 | +8.4 |
| Independent | Peter Mather | 1,809 | 10.3 | +10.3 |
| Total formal votes | | 17,640 | 98.4 | |
| Informal votes | | 277 | 1.6 | |
| Turnout | | 17,917 | 92.2 | |
Two-party-preferred result
| National | Clive Berghofer | 11,607 | 65.8 | +5.7 |
| Labor | Neville Green | 6,033 | 34.2 | −5.7 |
| National hold | | Swing | +5.7 | |

1983 Queensland state election: Toowoomba South
| Party | Candidate | Votes | % | ±% |
|---|---|---|---|---|
| National | John Warner | 8,964 | 52.0 | +7.0 |
| Labor | Kim McCasker | 6,500 | 37.7 | +4.5 |
| Liberal | Neil O'Sullivan | 1,782 | 10.3 | +7.8 |
| Total formal votes | | 17,256 | 99.1 | +0.5 |
| Informal votes | | 139 | 0.9 | −0.5 |
| Turnout | | 17,395 | 92.8 | +3.1 |
Two-party-preferred result
| National | John Warner | 10,348 | 60.0 | −0.1 |
| Labor | Kim McCasker | 6,898 | 40.0 | +0.1 |
| National hold | | Swing | −0.1 | |

1980 Queensland state election: Toowoomba South
| Party | Candidate | Votes | % | ±% |
|---|---|---|---|---|
| National | John Warner | 7,097 | 45.0 | −4.7 |
| Labor | Ron Fraser | 5,225 | 33.2 | −7.7 |
| Liberal | Colin Brimblecombe | 2,860 | 18.1 | +18.1 |
| Democrats | Michael Clifford | 578 | 3.7 | −5.7 |
| Total formal votes | | 15,760 | 98.6 | −0.2 |
| Informal votes | | 223 | 1.4 | +0.2 |
| Turnout | | 15,983 | 89.7 | −1.9 |
Two-party-preferred result
| National | John Warner | 9,471 | 60.1 | +5.2 |
| Labor | Ron Fraser | 6,289 | 39.9 | −5.2 |
| National hold | | Swing | +5.2 | |

=== Elections in the 1970s ===
1977 Queensland state election: Toowoomba South
| Party | Candidate | Votes | % | ±% |
|---|---|---|---|---|
| National | John Warner | 7,375 | 49.7 | +20.4 |
| Labor | Peter Wood | 6,073 | 40.9 | +2.5 |
| Democrats | Michael Clifford | 1,388 | 9.4 | +9.4 |
| Total formal votes | | 14,836 | 98.8 | |
| Informal votes | | 178 | 1.2 | |
| Turnout | | 15,014 | 91.6 | |
Two-party-preferred result
| National | John Warner | 8,145 | 54.9 | −3.1 |
| Labor | Peter Wood | 6,691 | 45.1 | +3.1 |
| National hold | | Swing | −3.1 | |

1974 Queensland state election: Toowoomba South
| Party | Candidate | Votes | % | ±% |
|---|---|---|---|---|
| Labor | Peter Wood | 5,469 | 38.4 | −14.7 |
| National | John Warner | 4,647 | 29.3 | +8.2 |
| Liberal | Leslie Whykes | 3,218 | 21.8 | +3.2 |
| Queensland Labor | Mary Ryan | 501 | 3.2 | −4.0 |
| Total formal votes | | 13,835 | 98.7 | −0.2 |
| Informal votes | | 178 | 1.3 | +0.2 |
| Turnout | | 14,013 | 88.4 | −5.6 |
Two-party-preferred result
| National | John Warner | 7,989 | 57.7 | +14.6 |
| Labor | Peter Wood | 5,846 | 42.3 | −14.6 |
| National gain from Labor | | Swing | +14.6 | |

1972 Queensland state election: Toowoomba South
| Party | Candidate | Votes | % | ±% |
|---|---|---|---|---|
| Labor | Peter Wood | 6,148 | 53.1 | −0.3 |
| Country | John Peel | 2,446 | 21.1 | +21.1 |
| Liberal | Allison Dickson | 2,151 | 18.6 | −21.6 |
| Queensland Labor | Francis Mullins | 831 | 7.2 | +0.8 |
| Total formal votes | | 11,576 | 98.9 | |
| Informal votes | | 133 | 1.1 | |
| Turnout | | 11,709 | 94.0 | |
Two-party-preferred result
| Labor | Peter Wood | 6,589 | 56.9 | +3.0 |
| Country | John Peel | 4,987 | 43.1 | +43.1 |
| Labor hold | | Swing | +3.0 | |
