= Candidates of the 2015 Queensland state election =

The 2015 Queensland state election was held on 31 January 2015.

A total of 433 candidates nominated for the 2015 election, by the close of nominations on 13 January 2015. There were three more candidates than there were at the last election in 2012, and the number of candidates is five short of the record number of 438 candidates at the 1998 state election.

== By-Elections ==
- On 30 March 2012, former Premier Anna Bligh (South Brisbane) resigned. At the by-election on 28 April 2012, Jackie Trad retained the electorate for the Labor Party.
- On 28 November 2012, Ray Hopper (Condamine) resigned from the Liberal National Party and joined Katter's Australian Party.
- On 30 November 2012, Carl Judge (Yeerongpilly) resigned from the Liberal National Party and sat as an independent. He then joined the Palmer United Party on 7 June 2013, but resigned on 8 October 2014 and again sat as an independent.
- On 1 December 2012, Alex Douglas (Gaven) resigned from the Liberal National Party and sat as an independent. He then joined the Palmer United Party on 7 Jun 2013, but resigned on 18 August 2014 and again sat as an independent.
- On 19 April 2013, Scott Driscoll (Redcliffe) resigned from the Liberal National Party and sat as an independent. On 19 November 2013 he resigned. At the by-election on 22 February 2014, Yvette D'Ath gained the seat for the Labor Party.
- On 23 May 2014, Chris Davis (Stafford) resigned. At the by-election on 19 July 2014, Anthony Lynham gained the seat for the Labor Party.

== Retiring Members ==
=== Labor ===
- Tim Mulherin (Mackay) – Announced 9 January 2015
- Desley Scott (Woodridge) – Announced 11 March 2014

=== Liberal National ===
- Peter Dowling (Redlands) – Lost preselection 25 October 2014
- Bruce Flegg (Moggill) – Lost preselection 7 December 2014
- David Gibson (Gympie) – Announced 2 May 2014
- Howard Hobbs (Warrego) – Announced 5 September 2014
- Vaughan Johnson (Gregory) – Announced 2 October 2014
- Ted Malone (Mirani) – Announced 26 September 2014
- Rosemary Menkens (Burdekin) – Announced 19 September 2014

=== Independent ===
- Liz Cunningham (Gladstone) – Announced 6 January 2015

== Legislative Assembly ==
Sitting members are shown in bold text. Successful candidates are highlighted in the relevant colour. Where there is possible confusion, an asterisk (*) is also used.

Electorate	Held by	Labor candidate	LNP candidate	Greens candidate	PUP candidate	Other candidates
Albert	LNP	Melissa McMahon	**Mark Boothman**	Jane Cajdler	Blair Brewster	Amanda Best (FFP)
Algester	LNP	Leeanne Enoch	**Anthony Shorten**	Susan Wolf		Kevin Forshaw (Ind)
Ashgrove	LNP	Kate Jones	**Campbell Newman**	Robert Hogg		Connie Cicchini (Ind); Peter Jeremijenko (Ind)
Aspley	LNP	Gayle Dallaston	**Tracy Davis**	Noel Clothier		
Barron River	LNP	Craig Crawford	**Michael Trout**	Noel Castley-Wright	Andrew Schebella	
Beaudesert	LNP	Kay Hohenhaus	**Jon Krause**	Pietro Agnoletto	Adele Ishaac	Robert Bowyer (ONP); Jeremy Fredericks (FFP)
Brisbane Central	LNP	Grace Grace	**Robert Cavallucci**	Kirsten Lovejoy		Kai Jones (Ind)
Broadwater	LNP	Penny Toland	**Verity Barton**	Daniel Kwon	George Sokolov	Stuart Ballantyne (FFP); Amin-Reza Javanmard (Ind); Phil Pollock (ONP)
Buderim	LNP	Elaine Hughes	**Steve Dickson**	Susan Etheridge	Tess Lazarus	
Bulimba	LNP	Di Farmer	**Aaron Dillaway**	David Hale		
Bundaberg	LNP	Leanne Donaldson	**Jack Dempsey**	Meg Anderson	Robert Brown	Richard Freudenberg (Ind)
Bundamba	Labor	**Jo-Ann Miller**	Stephen Fenton	Ava Greenwood		Luke Harris (FFP)
Burdekin	LNP	Angela Zyla	Dale Last	Lindy Collins	Jacinta Warland	BJ Davison (Ind); Steve Isles (KAP); Belinda Johnson (ONP)
Burleigh	LNP	Gail Hislop	**Michael Hart**	Jane Power	Jim MacAnally	Sue Baynes (FFP)
Burnett	LNP	Bryan Mustill	**Stephen Bennett**	Colin Sheppard	Richard Love	Peter Wyatt (Ind)
Cairns	LNP	Rob Pyne	**Gavin King**	Myra Gold	Jeanette Sackley	Bernice Kelly (Ind)
Callide	LNP	Graeme Martin	**Jeff Seeney**	Erich Schulz	John Bjelke-Petersen	Steve Ensby (Ind); Michael Higginson (Ind); Duncan Scott (Ind)
Caloundra	LNP	Jason Hunt	**Mark McArdle**	Fiona Anderson	Phil Collins	Barry Jones (Ind)
Capalaba	LNP	Don Brown	**Steve Davies**	Erin Payne		
Chatsworth	LNP	Paul Keene	**Steve Minnikin**	Jarred Reilly		Aaron Deecke (FFP)
Clayfield	LNP	John Martin	**Tim Nicholls**	Anthony Pink		Katrina MacDonald (Ind)
Cleveland	LNP	Tracey Huges	**Mark Robinson**	Amanda White		
Condamine	LNP	Brendon Huybregts	Pat Weir	Pamela Weekes		Ben Hopper (KAP); Alex Todd (FFP); Shane White (Ind)
Cook	LNP	Billy Gordon	**David Kempton**	Daryl Desjardin	Jason Booth	Lee Marriott (KAP); Michaelangelo Newie (Ind)
Coomera	LNP	Brett McCreadie	**Michael Crandon**	Chris Wisbey	Shirley Morgan	Cathy O'Brien (FFP)
Currumbin	LNP	Ashley Wain	**Jann Stuckey**	David Wyatt	Kristian Rees	Ben Donovan (FFP); Deborah Gravenall (ONP)
Dalrymple	KAP	Leanne Kettleton	Liz Schmidt	Valerie Weier		**Shane Knuth** (KAP)
Everton	LNP	Jeff Frew	**Tim Mander**	Aidan Norrie		
Ferny Grove	LNP	Mark Furner	**Dale Shuttleworth**	Michael Berkman	Mark Taverner	Di Gittins (Ind)
Gaven	LNP	Michael Riordan	Sid Cramp	Toni McPherson	Adam Marcinkowski	**Alex Douglas** (Ind); Chris Ivory (Ind); Ben O'Brien (FFP)
Gladstone	Independent	Glenn Butcher	Michael Duggan	Craig Tomsett		Craig Butler (Ind)
Glass House	LNP	Brent Hampstead	**Andrew Powell**	David Knobel	Scott Higgins	
Greenslopes	LNP	Joe Kelly	**Ian Kaye**	Darren Ellis		Matthew Darragh (FFP)
Gregory	LNP	Cheryl Thompson	Lachlan Millar	Norm Weston	Michael Linton-Helliar	Bruce Currie (Ind); Ross Stockham (KAP)
Gympie	LNP	Stephen Meredith	Tony Perrett	Shena MacDonald	Mitchell Frost	Shane Paulger (KAP)
Hervey Bay	LNP	Tony Gubbins	**Ted Sorensen**	Kristen Lyons	Lynette Pearsall	Axel Beard (FFP); Jannean Dean (Ind)
Hinchinbrook	LNP	Jesse Trecco-Alexander	**Andrew Cripps**	Jenny Stirling	Martin Brewster	Barry Barnes (KAP); Bill Hankin (ONP)
Inala	Labor	**Annastacia Palaszczuk**	Adam Hannant	Silke Volkmann		
Indooroopilly	LNP	Chris Horacek	**Scott Emerson**	Jake Schoermer		Anita Diamond (Ind); Ben Freney (Ind); Paul Swan (Ind)
Ipswich	LNP	Jennifer Howard	**Ian Berry**	Pat Walsh		Patricia Petersen (Ind); Tim Stieler (FFP)
Ipswich West	LNP	Jim Madden	**Sean Choat**	Ian Simons		Christopher Reynolds (ONP); Leo Talty (Ind)
Kallangur	LNP	Shane King	**Trevor Ruthenberg**	Jason Kennedy		
Kawana	LNP	Mark Moss	**Jarrod Bleijie**	Marcus Finch	Jeremy Davey	Jason Deller (Ind); Michael Jessop (Ind)
Keppel	LNP	Brittany Lauga	**Bruce Young**	Brandon Jones	Warren Purnell	Bruce Diamond (Ind)
Lockyer	LNP	Steve Leese	**Ian Rickuss**	Clare Rudkin	Craig Gunnis	Pauline Hanson (ONP); David Neuendorf (KAP)
Logan	LNP	Linus Power	**Michael Pucci**	Kim Southwood		Peter Ervik (Ind); Daniel Murphy (Ind); David Pellowe (FFP)
Lytton	LNP	Joan Pease	**Neil Symes**	Dave Nelson		Jamie Evans (Ind); Tamera Michel (Ind)
Mackay	Labor	Julieanne Gilbert	Deon Attard	Jonathon Dykyj		Julie Boyd (Ind); Lindsay Temple (FFP)
Mansfield	LNP	Adam Obeid	**Ian Walker**	Nick Jelicic		Jarrod Wirth (Ind)
Maroochydore	LNP	Bill Gissane	**Fiona Simpson**	Trudy Byrnes	James McDonald	
Maryborough	LNP	Bruce Saunders	**Anne Maddern**	Katherine Webb	Steve Anderson	Chris Foley (Ind); Damian Huxham (ONP); Russell Wattie (Ind)
Mermaid Beach	LNP	Gary Pead	**Ray Stevens**	Helen Wainwright	Alex Caraco	Simon Green (FFP)
Mirani	LNP	Jim Pearce	John Kerslake	Trisha Brindley	Michael Hall	
Moggill	LNP	Louisa Pink	Christian Rowan	Charles Worringham	Dion Van Zyl	Barry Searle (Ind)
Morayfield	LNP	Mark Ryan	**Darren Grimwade**	Paul Costin	Bill Rogan	Stephen Beck (Ind); Jon Eaton (FFP); Andrew Tyrrell (Ind)
Mount Coot-tha	LNP	Steven Miles	**Saxon Rice**	Omar Ameer		Charles McAlister (Ind)
Mount Isa	KAP	Simon Tayler	John Wharton	Marcus Foth		**Rob Katter*** (KAP); Scott Sheard (ONP)
Mount Ommaney	LNP	Jess Pugh	**Tarnya Smith**	Jennifer Mulkearns	Kathleen Hewlett	
Mudgeeraba	LNP	Georgi Leader	**Ros Bates**	Roger Brisbane	Benedict Figueroa	Chris Petersen (FFP); Bill Sherwood (Ind)
Mulgrave	Labor	**Curtis Pitt**	Robyn Quick	Henry Boer	Christian Wolff	Damian Byrnes (Ind)
Mundingburra	LNP	Coralee O'Rourke	**David Crisafulli**	Jenny Brown	Clive Mensink	
Murrumba	LNP	Chris Whiting	**Reg Gulley**	Simone Dejun		Ray Hutchinson (FFP)
Nanango	LNP	Liz Hollens-Riley	**Deb Frecklington**	Grant Newson	Jason Ford	**Ray Hopper** (KAP); Dean Love (Ind)
Nicklin	Independent	Justin Raethel	Matt Trace	Julie Doolan		**Peter Wellington** (Ind)
Noosa	LNP	Mark Denham	**Glen Elmes**	Joe Shlegeris	Ian Woods	
Nudgee	LNP	Leanne Linard	**Jason Woodforth**	Claire Ogden	Peter Dufficy	Edward Monaei (Ind)
Pine Rivers	LNP	Nikki Boyd	**Seath Holswich**	John Marshall		Thor Prohaska (Ind)
Pumicestone	LNP	Rick Williams	**Lisa France**	Daniel O'Connell	Blair Verrier	Bevan Collingwood (Ind); Denis Johnson (Ind)
Redcliffe	Labor	**Yvette D'Ath**	Kerri-Anne Dooley	Pete Johnson	Steven Griffith	Shayne Jarvis (Ind); Mark White (FFP)
Redlands	LNP	Deborah Kellie	Matt McEachan	David Keogh	Susan Bylett	Carolyn Ferrando (FFP); Sheena Hewlett (Ind)
Rockhampton	Labor	**Bill Byrne**	Bridie Luva	Michelle Taylor		Anne O'Connor (Ind); Sally Vincent (FFP)
Sandgate	LNP	Stirling Hinchliffe	**Kerry Millard**	John Harbison		Hamish Gray (Ind)
South Brisbane	Labor	**Jackie Trad**	Fiona Ward	Jonathan Sri		Karel Boele (Ind)
Southern Downs	LNP	Louise Ryan	**Lawrence Springborg**	Elizabeth Ure		John Spellman (FFP)
Southport	LNP	Rowan Holzberger	**Rob Molhoek**	Petrina Maizey	Nicole Stanton	Matthew Mackechnie (Ind)
Springwood	LNP	Mick de Brenni	**John Grant**	Janina Leo	Peter Chamberlain	Chris Lawrie (FFP)
Stafford	Labor	**Anthony Lynham**	Bob Andersen	Anne Boccabella		
Stretton	LNP	Duncan Pegg	**Freya Ostapovitch**	Brian Sadler		David Forde (Ind)
Sunnybank	LNP	Peter Russo	**Mark Stewart**	Gordon King		
Surfers Paradise	LNP	Joshua Blundell-Thornton	**John-Paul Langbroek**	Helen Hunt	Stephen Gardner	Jonathon Scoones (FFP)
Thuringowa	LNP	Aaron Harper	**Sam Cox**	Karen Thompson	Ian Ferguson	Margaret Bell (Ind); Jeff Knuth (ONP); Michael Waters (FFP)
Toowoomba North	LNP	Kerry Shine	**Trevor Watts**	Ken Gover	Mandeep Sandhu	Ken Elliott (KAP); Greg Keane (Ind); John Sands (FFP)
Toowoomba South	LNP	Graham Storey	**John McVeigh**	Anne Waters		
Townsville	LNP	Scott Stewart	**John Hathaway**	Gail Hamilton	Alan Birrell	Michael Punshon (FFP); Leanne Rissman (ONP)
Warrego	LNP	Mark O'Brien	Ann Leahy	Sandra Bayley	Guy Sara	Ruth Golden (Ind)
Waterford	LNP	Shannon Fentiman	**Mike Latter**	Ray Smith		Jason Dickson (Ind); Jeffrey Hodges (Ind)
Whitsunday	LNP	Bronwyn Taha	**Jason Costigan**	Tony Fontes	Kylee Stanton	Dan van Blarcom (Ind)
Woodridge	Labor	Cameron Dick	Steve Viliamu	Scott Thomson		Dave Beard (Ind); Trevor Palmer (Ind)
Yeerongpilly	LNP	Mark Bailey	Leila Abukar	Gillian Marshall-Pierce	Georgina Walton	**Carl Judge** (Ind)
