= Members of the Queensland Legislative Assembly, 2015–2017 =

Members of the Queensland Legislative Assembly, 2015–2017

This is a list of members of the 55th Legislative Assembly of Queensland from 2015 to 2017, as elected at the 2015 election held on 31 January 2015.

Name	Party	District	Term
Hon Mark Bailey	Labor	Yeerongpilly	2015–present
Verity Barton	LNP	Broadwater	2012–2017
Ros Bates	LNP	Mudgeeraba	2009–present
Stephen Bennett	LNP	Burnett	2012–present
Jarrod Bleijie	LNP	Kawana	2009–present
Mark Boothman	LNP	Albert	2012–present
Nikki Boyd	Labor	Pine Rivers	2015–present
Don Brown	Labor	Capalaba	2015–present
Glenn Butcher	Labor	Gladstone	2015–present
Hon Bill Byrne	Labor	Rockhampton	2012–2017
Jason Costigan	LNP	Whitsunday	2012–2020
Sid Cramp	LNP	Gaven	2015–2017
Michael Crandon	LNP	Coomera	2009–present
Craig Crawford	Labor	Barron River	2015–present
Andrew Cripps	LNP	Hinchinbrook	2006–2017
Hon Yvette D'Ath	Labor	Redcliffe	2014–present
Tracy Davis	LNP	Aspley	2009–2017
Hon Mick de Brenni	Labor	Springwood	2015–present
Hon Cameron Dick	Labor	Woodridge	2009–2012, 2015–present
Steve Dickson ^{[4]}	LNP/One Nation	Buderim	2006–2017
Hon Leanne Donaldson	Labor	Bundaberg	2015–2017
Glen Elmes	LNP	Noosa	2006–2017
Scott Emerson	LNP	Indooroopilly	2009–2017
Hon Leeanne Enoch	Labor	Algester	2015–present
Di Farmer	Labor	Bulimba	2009–2012, 2015–present
Hon Shannon Fentiman	Labor	Waterford	2015–present
Deb Frecklington	LNP	Nanango	2012–present
Mark Furner	Labor	Ferny Grove	2015–present
Julieanne Gilbert	Labor	Mackay	2015–present
Billy Gordon	Labor/Independent ^{[1]}	Cook	2015–2017
Hon Grace Grace	Labor	Brisbane Central	2007–2012, 2015–present
Aaron Harper	Labor	Thuringowa	2015–present
Michael Hart	LNP	Burleigh	2012–present
Hon Stirling Hinchliffe	Labor	Sandgate	2006–2012, 2015–present
Jennifer Howard	Labor	Ipswich	2015–present
David Janetzki ^{[3]}	LNP	Toowoomba South	2016–present
Hon Kate Jones	Labor	Ashgrove	2006–2012, 2015–2020
Robbie Katter	KAP	Mount Isa	2012–present
Joe Kelly	Labor	Greenslopes	2015–present
Shane King	Labor	Kallangur	2015–present
Shane Knuth	KAP	Dalrymple	2004–present
Jon Krause	LNP	Beaudesert	2012–present
John-Paul Langbroek	LNP	Surfers Paradise	2004–present
Dale Last	LNP	Burdekin	2015–present
Brittany Lauga	Labor	Keppel	2015–present
Ann Leahy	LNP	Warrego	2015–present
Leanne Linard	Labor	Nudgee	2015–present
Hon Dr Anthony Lynham	Labor	Stafford	2014–2020
Jim Madden	Labor	Ipswich West	2015–present
Tim Mander	LNP	Everton	2012–present
Mark McArdle	LNP	Caloundra	2004–2020
Matt McEachan	LNP	Redlands	2015–2017
John McVeigh ^{[3]}	LNP	Toowoomba South	2012–2016
Hon Steven Miles	Labor	Mount Coot-tha	2015–present
Lachlan Millar	LNP	Gregory	2015–present
Jo-Ann Miller	Labor	Bundamba	2000–2020
Steve Minnikin	LNP	Chatsworth	2012–present
Rob Molhoek	LNP	Southport	2012–present
Tim Nicholls	LNP	Clayfield	2006–present
Hon Coralee O'Rourke	Labor	Mundingburra	2015–2020
Hon Annastacia Palaszczuk	Labor	Inala	2006–present
Jim Pearce	Labor	Mirani	1989–2009, 2015–2017
Joan Pease	Labor	Lytton	2015–present
Duncan Pegg	Labor	Stretton	2015–2021
Tony Perrett	LNP	Gympie	2015–present
Hon Curtis Pitt	Labor	Mulgrave	2009–present
Andrew Powell	LNP	Glass House	2009–present
Linus Power	Labor	Logan	2015–present
Rob Pyne	Labor/Independent ^{[2]}	Cairns	2015–2017
Ian Rickuss	LNP	Lockyer	2004–2017
Mark Robinson	LNP	Cleveland	2009–present
Dr Christian Rowan	LNP	Moggill	2015–present
Peter Russo	Labor	Sunnybank	2015–present
Mark Ryan	Labor	Morayfield	2009–2012, 2015–present
Bruce Saunders	Labor	Maryborough	2015–present
Jeff Seeney	LNP	Callide	1998–2017
Fiona Simpson	LNP	Maroochydore	1992–present
Tarnya Smith	LNP	Mount Ommaney	2012–2017
Ted Sorensen	LNP	Hervey Bay	2009–2020
Lawrence Springborg	LNP	Southern Downs	1989–2017
Ray Stevens	LNP	Mermaid Beach	2006–present
Scott Stewart	Labor	Townsville	2015–present
Jann Stuckey	LNP	Currumbin	2004–2020
Hon Jackie Trad	Labor	South Brisbane	2012–2020
Ian Walker	LNP	Mansfield	2012–2017
Trevor Watts	LNP	Toowoomba North	2012–present
Pat Weir	LNP	Condamine	2015–present
Peter Wellington	Independent	Nicklin	1998–2017
Chris Whiting	Labor	Murrumba	2015–present
Rick Williams	Labor	Pumicestone	2015–2017

^{1} Cook MP Billy Gordon was expelled from the Labor Party on 29 March 2015 following media reports of undeclared criminal offences and domestic violence allegations.
^{2} Cairns MP Rob Pyne resigned from the Labor Party on 7 March 2016.
^{3} Toowoomba South MP John McVeigh resigned from parliament on 29 April 2016 to contest the federal seat of Groom at the 2016 federal election. David Janetzki was elected as his replacement at a by-election on 16 July 2016.
^{4} Buderim MP Steve Dickson resigned from the Liberal National Party on 13 January 2017 and joined Pauline Hanson's One Nation.
