= Electoral results for the district of Morayfield =

Queensland, Australia, district election results

This is a list of electoral results for the electoral district of Morayfield in Queensland state elections.

== Members for Morayfield ==
Member	Party	Term
Mark Ryan	Labor	2009–2012
Darren Grimwade	Liberal National	2012–2015
Mark Ryan	Labor	2015–present

== Election results ==
=== Elections in the 2020s ===
2024 Queensland state election: Morayfield
Party	Candidate	Votes	%	±%
Labor	Mark Ryan	15,479	45.25	−9.15
Liberal National	Sarah Ross	9,786	28.61	+6.91
One Nation	Rodney Hansen	3,869	11.31	−0.59
Greens	Mark Jessup	2,338	6.83	−1.07
Legalise Cannabis	Frank Jordan	1,750	5.12	+5.12
Family First	Suniti Hewett	986	2.88	+2.88
Total formal votes		34,208	94.87	
Informal votes		1,850	5.13	
Turnout		36,058	85.15	
Two-party-preferred result
Labor	Mark Ryan	19,520	57.06	−9.74
Liberal National	Sarah Ross	14,688	42.94	+9.74
Labor hold		Swing	-9.74	

2020 Queensland state election: Morayfield
Party	Candidate	Votes	%	±%
Labor	Mark Ryan	16,386	54.38	+8.62
Liberal National	Theresa Craig	6,549	21.73	+1.67
One Nation	Rodney Hansen	3,582	11.89	−13.34
Greens	Amy Smith	2,393	7.94	+1.91
Independent	Jason Snow	631	2.09	+2.09
Informed Medical Options	Grant Matthews	594	1.97	+1.97
Total formal votes		30,135	95.47	−0.07
Informal votes		1,429	4.53	+0.07
Turnout		31,564	85.33	−1.24
Two-party-preferred result
Labor	Mark Ryan	20,109	66.73	+7.40
Liberal National	Theresa Craig	10,026	33.27	−7.40
Labor hold		Swing	+7.40	

=== Elections in the 2010s ===
2017 Queensland state election: Morayfield
Party	Candidate	Votes	%	±%
Labor	Mark Ryan	13,101	45.8	−4.9
One Nation	Rodney Hansen	7,223	25.2	+25.2
Liberal National	Jason Snow	5,744	20.1	−10.8
Greens	Gavin Behrens	1,727	6.0	+0.4
Independent	Jamie Janulewicz	837	2.9	+2.9
Total formal votes		28,632	95.5	−1.9
Informal votes		1,335	4.5	+1.9
Turnout		29,967	86.6	+4.1
Two-candidate-preferred result
Labor	Mark Ryan	16,814	58.7	−4.8
One Nation	Rodney Hansen	11,818	41.3	+41.3
Labor hold		Swing	−4.8	

2015 Queensland state election: Morayfield
Party	Candidate	Votes	%	±%
Labor	Mark Ryan	14,952	50.65	+13.90
Liberal National	Darren Grimwade	9,708	32.88	−14.14
Palmer United	William Rogan	1,918	6.50	+6.50
Greens	Paul Costin	1,309	4.43	−1.20
Family First	Jon Eaton	890	3.01	+3.01
Independent	Stephen Beck	572	1.94	+1.94
Independent	Andrew Charles Tyrrell	174	0.59	+0.59
Total formal votes		29,523	97.52	+0.15
Informal votes		750	2.48	−0.15
Turnout		30,273	90.80	−1.37
Two-party-preferred result
Labor	Mark Ryan	17,073	61.91	+17.48
Liberal National	Darren Grimwade	10,502	38.09	−17.48
Labor gain from Liberal National		Swing	+17.48	

2012 Queensland state election: Morayfield
Party	Candidate	Votes	%	±%
Liberal National	Darren Grimwade	12,779	47.02	+13.95
Labor	Mark Ryan	9,988	36.75	−11.69
Katter's Australian	Stephen Beck	2,880	10.60	+10.60
Greens	Paul Doherty	1,532	5.64	−1.68
Total formal votes		27,179	97.37	−0.07
Informal votes		734	2.63	+0.07
Turnout		27,913	92.17	+0.01
Two-party-preferred result
Liberal National	Darren Grimwade	13,818	55.57	+14.70
Labor	Mark Ryan	11,046	44.43	−14.70
Liberal National gain from Labor		Swing	+14.70	

=== Elections in the 2000s ===
2009 Queensland state election: Morayfield
Party	Candidate	Votes	%	±%
Labor	Mark Ryan	12,570	48.4	−6.0
Liberal National	Fiona Brydon	8,581	33.1	−1.0
Independent	Lynette Devereaux	2,898	11.2	+11.2
Greens	Therese O'Brien	1,900	7.3	−4.1
Total formal votes		25,949	97.1	
Informal votes		681	2.9	
Turnout		26,630	92.2	
Two-party-preferred result
Labor	Mark Ryan	13,839	59.1	−1.6
Liberal National	Fiona Brydon	9,565	40.9	+1.6
Labor hold		Swing	−1.6	
