= Electoral results for the district of Sunnybank =

Queensland, Australia, district election results

This is a list of electoral results for the electoral district of Sunnybank in Queensland state elections.

== Members for Sunnybank ==
First incarnation (1992–2001)
Member	Party	Term
Stephen Robertson	Labor	1992–2001
Second incarnation (2009–present)
Member	Party	Term
Judy Spence	Labor	2009–2012
Mark Stewart	Liberal National	2012–2015
Peter Russo	Labor	2015–2017

== Election results ==
=== Elections in the 2010s ===
2015 Queensland state election: Sunnybank
Party	Candidate	Votes	%	±%
Labor	Peter Russo	12,993	49.27	+16.54
Liberal National	Mark Stewart	10,537	39.96	−12.74
Greens	Gordon King	2,839	10.77	+1.21
Total formal votes		26,369	97.68	+0.47
Informal votes		626	2.32	−0.47
Turnout		26,995	87.67	−1.27
Two-party-preferred result
Labor	Peter Russo	14,564	57.19	+17.42
Liberal National	Mark Stewart	10,901	42.81	−17.42
Labor gain from Liberal National		Swing	+17.42	

2012 Queensland state election: Sunnybank
Party	Candidate	Votes	%	±%
Liberal National	Mark Stewart	13,578	52.70	+17.27
Labor	Meg Bishop	8,434	32.73	−21.77
Greens	Gordon King	2,463	9.56	+1.61
Family First	Matt Darragh	1,291	5.01	+5.01
Total formal votes		25,766	97.21	−0.43
Informal votes		739	2.79	+0.43
Turnout		26,505	88.94	−1.06
Two-party-preferred result
Liberal National	Mark Stewart	14,441	60.23	+21.02
Labor	Meg Bishop	9,535	39.77	−21.02
Liberal National gain from Labor		Swing	+21.02	

=== Elections in the 2000s ===
2009 Queensland state election: Sunnybank
Party	Candidate	Votes	%	±%
Labor	Judy Spence	14,398	54.5	−3.7
Liberal National	Marie Jackson	9,358	35.4	+4.7
Greens	Matthew Ryan-Sykes	2,101	8.0	+0.1
Independent	Bruce Spiers	355	1.3	+1.3
Independent	Peter Flaws	204	0.8	+0.8
Total formal votes		26,416	97.5	
Informal votes		638	2.5	
Turnout		27,054	90.0	
Two-party-preferred result
Labor	Judy Spence	15,261	60.8	−4.4
Liberal National	Marie Jackson	9,845	39.2	+4.4
Labor hold		Swing	−4.4	

=== Elections in the 1990s ===
1998 Queensland state election: Sunnybank
Party	Candidate	Votes	%	±%
Labor	Stephen Robertson	12,691	47.5	+0.1
Liberal	Steven Huang	8,229	30.8	−15.1
One Nation	Ken Lock	4,646	17.4	+17.4
Greens	Andrew Grigg	1,172	4.4	+4.4
Total formal votes		26,738	98.5	+0.1
Informal votes		406	1.5	−0.1
Turnout		27,144	93.0	+0.1
Two-party-preferred result
Labor	Stephen Robertson	14,708	58.2	+6.8
Liberal	Steven Huang	10,572	41.8	−6.8
Labor hold		Swing	+6.8	

1995 Queensland state election: Sunnybank
Party	Candidate	Votes	%	±%
Labor	Stephen Robertson	11,173	47.3	−4.7
Liberal	Lynne Friis	10,820	45.8	+16.6
Democrats	Alan Dickson	1,613	6.8	+6.8
Total formal votes		23,606	98.4	+0.4
Informal votes		393	1.6	−0.4
Turnout		23,999	92.9	
Two-party-preferred result
Labor	Stephen Robertson	12,021	51.4	−4.2
Liberal	Lynne Friis	11,381	48.6	+4.2
Labor hold		Swing	−4.2	

1992 Queensland state election: Sunnybank
Party	Candidate	Votes	%	±%
Labor	Stephen Robertson	11,139	52.1	−0.8
Liberal	Gary Hardgrave	6,255	29.2	−2.3
National	Alan Hales	2,902	13.6	−2.0
Independent	Vivienne Rohrlach	1,099	5.1	+5.1
Total formal votes		21,395	97.9	
Informal votes		449	2.1	
Turnout		21,844	92.7	
Two-party-preferred result
Labor	Stephen Robertson	11,622	55.5	+1.5
Liberal	Gary Hardgrave	9,306	44.5	−1.5
Labor hold		Swing	+1.5	
