= 2015 Queensland state election =

- 31 January 2015

All 89 seats in the Legislative Assembly of Queensland 45 Assembly seats were needed for a majority
- Opinion polls
- Turnout: 89.89 (▼1.11 pp)
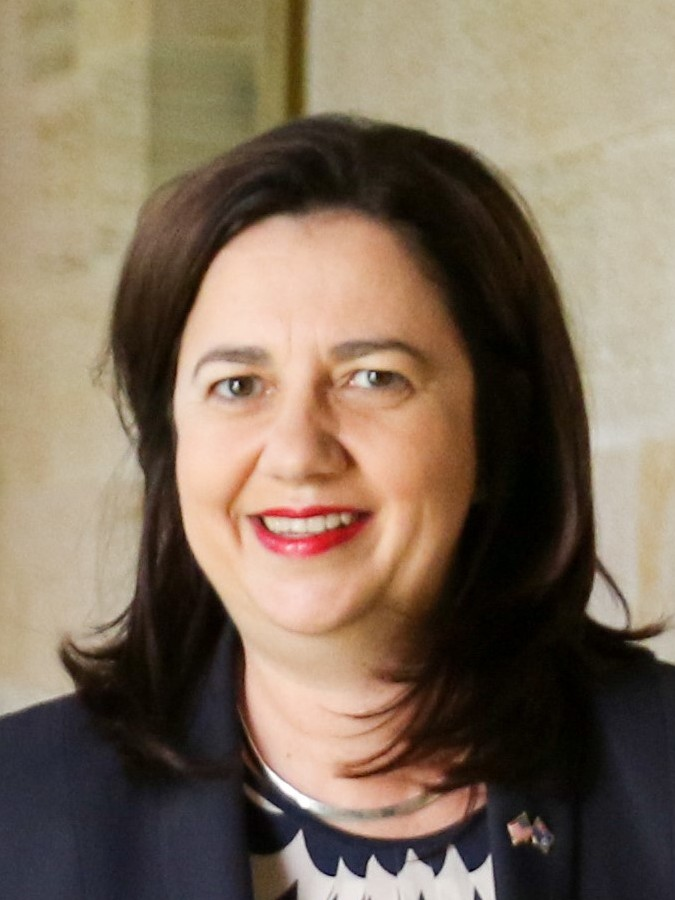

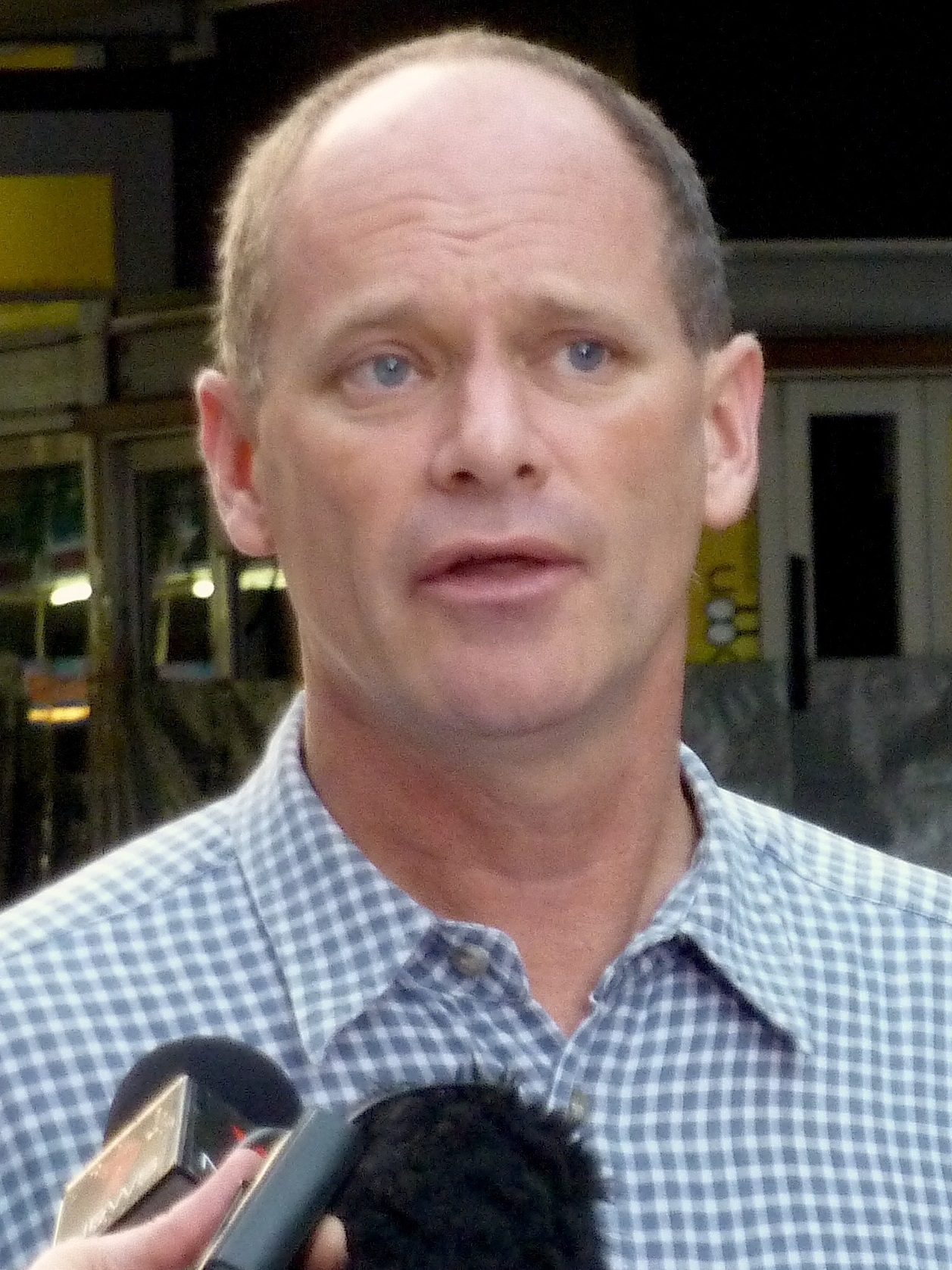
| | First party | Second party | Third party |
|---|---|---|---|
| | | | KAP |
| Leader | Annastacia Palaszczuk | Campbell Newman | Ray Hopper |
| Party | Labor | Liberal National | Katter's Australian |
| Leader since | 28 March 2012 | 22 March 2011 | 29 November 2012 |
| Leader's seat | Inala | Ashgrove (lost seat) | Condamine (lost Nanango) |
| Last election | 7 seats, 26.66% | 78 seats, 49.66% | 2 seats, 11.53% |
| Seats before | 9 | 73 | 3 |
| Seats won | 44 | 42 | 2 |
| Seat change | ▲35 | ▼31 | ▼1 |
| Popular vote | 983,054 | 1,084,060 | 50,588 |
| Percentage | 37.47% | 41.32% | 1.93% |
| Swing | ▲10.81 | ▼8.33 | ▼9.61 |
| TPP | 51.1% | 48.9% |
| TPP swing | ▲14.0 | ▼14.0 |
- Winning margin by electorate.
Premier before election
Campbell Newman
Liberal National
Premier after election
Annastacia Palaszczuk
Labor

The 2015 Queensland state election was held on 31 January 2015 to elect all 89 members of the unicameral Legislative Assembly of Queensland.

The centre-right Liberal National Party (LNP), led by Premier Campbell Newman, attempted to win a second term but was defeated by the opposition centre-left Australian Labor Party (ALP), led by Opposition Leader Annastacia Palaszczuk. Labor formed a minority government with the support of the lone independent MP in the chamber, Peter Wellington. It is only the seventh change of government in Queensland since 1915, and only the third time since 1932 that a sitting government in the state has failed to win a second term. Furthermore, Annastacia Palaszczuk became the first woman to win government from opposition in a state election (eventual Chief Minister Clare Martin led the Labor Party to victory from opposition in 2001 at an election in the Northern Territory).

The previous election saw Labor, which had governed the state for all but two years since 1989, suffer the worst defeat of a sitting government in the state's history. The LNP won 78 seats—the largest majority government in Queensland history—compared to seven for Labor, two for Katter's Australian Party, and two won by independents. Following Labor's defeat former Premier Anna Bligh retired from politics and was succeeded as party leader by her former Transport Minister, Palaszczuk. Months later, Ray Hopper left the LNP to lead Katter's Australian Party while two further LNP MPs became independents, resulting in a total of 75 LNP seats, seven Labor seats, three Katter seats and four independent seats. Two by-elections saw Labor defeat the LNP, reducing the LNP to 73 seats with Labor on 9 seats. Although Labor hoped to regain much of what it lost in its severe defeat of three years earlier, most polls pointed to the LNP being returned for another term with a reduced majority.

On election night, the outcome of the election was inconclusive, though most political analysts projected that the LNP had lost its majority after suffering what ended up being a record 14-point two-party swing. Newman was defeated in his seat of Ashgrove to his predecessor, Kate Jones—only the second time since Federation that a sitting Queensland premier has lost their own seat. With the outcome in his own seat beyond doubt, Newman announced his retirement from politics, though remained as caretaker premier pending the final results. According to projections from both ABC News and Brisbane's The Courier-Mail, Labor had taken at least 30 seats from the LNP, and was very close to picking up the 36-seat swing it needed to form government in its own right—a feat initially thought impossible when the writs were issued. On the day after the election, both outlets had Labor either two or three seats short of a majority. Political analysts opined that the balance of power was likely to rest with Katter's Australian Party and independent Wellington.

Wellington announced on 5 February he would support a Palaszczuk-led Labor minority government on confidence and supply while retaining the right to vote on conscience. On 13 February, the Electoral Commission of Queensland declared the results of the election. Labor won 44 seats, one short of a majority, putting Labor in a position to form a minority government in the hung parliament. Even allowing for the LNP's previously overwhelming majority, the 37-seat swing is the second-largest shift of seats against a sitting government in Queensland since Federation, only exceeded by the 44-seat shift against Labor in 2012. Conversely, the two-party swing of 13.7 points in 2012 was exceeded by the 2015 two-party swing of 14.0 points.

Palaszczuk approached Governor Paul de Jersey on 11 February and advised him that she could form a minority government. Palaszczuk and de Jersey met again on 13 February. At that meeting, de Jersey formally invited Palaszczuk to form a government, an invitation that Palaszczuk accepted. On 14 February, Palaszczuk was sworn in as the 39th Premier of Queensland.

== Background ==
The last state election to be held was the 2012 Queensland state election where the Australian Labor Party led by Premier Anna Bligh attempted to win a second term as Premier in her own right and a third term overall and a sixth consecutive term in office. Opposing her was the Liberal National Party led by Campbell Newman. The election was the second for Bligh who had succeeded Peter Beattie as Premier in 2007. Newman was the former Lord Mayor of Brisbane from 2004 to 2011, having resigned the position to run for Premier.

As Newman did not have a seat in state parliament, he chose to contest preselection in the seat of Ashgrove for the 2012 election, and lead the party from outside of parliament until the election. Jeff Seeney served as Opposition Leader in the parliament.

The Labor Party went into the election with a modest margin with 51 seats, while the Liberal National Party had 32 seats. Labor was defeated in an historic landslide, the LNP winning 78 seats to just seven for Labor, with Newman winning Ashgrove from the former Environment Minister, Kate Jones.

Aidan McLindon, the parliamentary leader of the Katter's Australia Party, lost his seat of Beaudesert, but the KAP won two seats. Only two of the independent members were re-elected.

Three by-elections occurred after the 2012 state election. Labor candidate Yvette D'Ath won the 2014 Redcliffe by-election in February, and Labor candidate Anthony Lynham won the 2014 Stafford by-election in July. Jackie Trad held Bligh's former seat of South Brisbane of Labor in an April 2012 by-election, following Bligh's resignation from parliament.

On 5 January 2015, media organisations reported that Newman intended to announce the election date the next day. On 6 January, Newman confirmed on Twitter that he had visited acting governor Tim Carmody and writs had been issued for an election on 31 January. This was the first time in over a century that an Australian general election was held in January. The last January election was held in Tasmania in 1913 and the last on the mainland was the New South Wales colonial election of 1874–75.

The election was held on the same day as the 2015 Davenport state by-election in South Australia.

== Key dates ==
| Date | Event |
|---|---|
| 6 January 2015 | Writ of election issued by the acting Governor |
| 10 January 2015 | Close of electoral rolls |
| 13 January 2015 | Close of nominations |
| 31 January 2015 | Polling day, between the hours of 8am and 6pm |
| 10 February 2015 | Cut off for the return of postal ballot papers |
| 13 February 2015 | Election results declared, Annastacia Palaszczuk is asked to form government |
| 14 February 2015 | Interim Palaszczuk Ministry is sworn in |
| 16 February 2015 | Full Palaszczuk Ministry sworn in |
| 16 February 2015 | Writ returned and results formally declared |
| 24 March 2015 | 55th Parliament convened |

== Retiring members ==
=== Labor ===
- Tim Mulherin (Mackay) – Announced 9 January 2015
- Desley Scott (Woodridge) – Announced 11 March 2014

=== Liberal National ===
- Peter Dowling (Redlands) – Lost preselection 25 October 2014
- Bruce Flegg (Moggill) – Lost preselection 7 December 2014
- David Gibson (Gympie) – Announced 2 May 2014
- Howard Hobbs (Warrego) – Announced 5 September 2014
- Vaughan Johnson (Gregory) – Announced 2 October 2014
- Ted Malone (Mirani) – Announced 26 September 2014
- Rosemary Menkens (Burdekin) – Announced 19 September 2014

=== Independent ===
- Liz Cunningham (Gladstone) – Announced 6 January 2015

== Results ==
The composition of the Legislative Assembly following the election.

Winning party by electorate.

Results of the 2015 Queensland state election, Legislative Assembly
| Party | Votes | % | +/– | Seats | +/– |
|---|---|---|---|---|---|
| Liberal National | 1,084,060 | 41.32 | –8.33 | 42 | -34 |
| Labor | 983,054 | 37.47 | +10.81 | 44 | +35 |
| Greens | 221,157 | 8.43 | +0.90 | 0 | ±0 |
| Palmer United | 133,929 | 5.11 | +5.11 | 0 | ±0 |
| Katter's Australian | 50,588 | 1.93 | –9.61 | 2 | ±0 |
| Family First | 31,231 | 1.19 | –0.17 | 0 | ±0 |
| One Nation | 24,111 | 0.92 | +0.82 | 0 | ±0 |
| Independents | 95,313 | 3.63 | +0.47 | 1 | –1 |
| Total | 2,623,443 | 100.00 | – | 89 | – |
| Valid votes | 2,623,443 | 97.89 | | | |
| Invalid/blank votes | 56,431 | 2.11 | –0.05 | | |
| Total votes | 2,679,874 | 100.00 | – | | |
| Registered voters/turnout | 2,981,145 | 89.89 | –1.11 | | |

Gallagher Index for the 2015 Queensland state election
| Party | Votes (%) | Seats (%) | Difference | Difference squared |
|---|---|---|---|---|
| Liberal National | 41.32% | 47.19% | 5.87 | 34.4569 |
| Labor | 37.47% | 49.44% | 11.97 | 143.2809 |
| Greens | 8.43% | 0.00% | -8.43 | 71.0649 |
| Palmer United | 5.11% | 0.00% | -5.11 | 26.1121 |
| Katter's Australian | 1.93% | 2.25% | 0.32 | 0.1024 |
| Family First | 1.19% | 0.00% | -1.19 | 1.4161 |
| One Nation | 0.92% | 0.00% | -0.92 | 0.8464 |
| Independent | 3.63% | 1.12% | -2.51 | 6.3001 |
| Total of differences squared | | | | 283.5798 |
| Total / 2 | | | | 141.7899 |
| Square root of (Total / 2): Gallagher Index result | | | | 11.91 |
^{The Gallagher Index ranges from 0 to 100. Low indexes (close to 0) are very proportionate, high indexes (20 or greater) are very disproportionate.}

Popular vote
| LNP | 41.32% |
| Labor | 37.47% |
| Greens | 8.43% |
| Palmer United | 5.11% |
| Katter's | 1.93% |
| Family First | 1.19% |
| One Nation | 0.92% |
| Independents | 3.63% |

Two-party preferred vote
| Labor | 48.9% |
| LNP | 51.1% |

Seats
| Labor | 49.44% |
| LNP | 47.19% |
| Katter's | 2.25% |
| Independents | 1.12% |

== Seats changing hands ==
| Seat | 2012 Election | | | Swing | 2015 Election | | |
| Seat | Party | Member | Margin | Swing | Margin | Member | Party |
| Algester | Liberal National | Anthony Shorten | 9.15 | −16.14 | 6.99 | Leeanne Enoch | Labor |
| Ashgrove | Liberal National | Campbell Newman | 5.70 | −9.95 | 4.25 | Kate Jones | Labor |
| Barron River | Liberal National | Michael Trout | 9.48 | −12.60 | 3.12 | Craig Crawford | Labor |
| Brisbane Central | Liberal National | Robert Cavallucci | 4.88 | −8.13 | 3.25 | Grace Grace | Labor |
| Bulimba | Liberal National | Aaron Dillaway | 0.14 | −6.28 | 6.14 | Di Farmer | Labor |
| Bundaberg | Liberal National | Jack Dempsey | 18.17 | −19.79 | 1.62 | Leanne Donaldson | Labor |
| Cairns | Liberal National | Gavin King | 8.87 | −17.32 | 8.45 | Rob Pyne | Labor |
| Capalaba | Liberal National | Steve Davies | 3.73 | −10.79 | 7.06 | Don Brown | Labor |
| Cook | Liberal National | David Kempton | 3.43 | −10.20 | 6.77 | Billy Gordon | Labor |
| Ferny Grove | Liberal National | Dale Shuttleworth | 9.52 | −10.34 | 0.82 | Mark Furner | Labor |
| Gladstone | Independent | Liz Cunningham | 14.03 | −25.93 | 11.89 | Glenn Butcher | Labor |
| Greenslopes | Liberal National | Ian Kaye | 2.45 | −6.70 | 4.25 | Joe Kelly | Labor |
| Ipswich | Liberal National | Ian Berry | 4.19 | −20.09 | 15.90 | Jennifer Howard | Labor |
| Ipswich West | Liberal National | Sean Choat | 7.16 | −14.88 | 7.71 | Jim Madden | Labor |
| Kallangur | Liberal National | Trevor Ruthenberg | 12.43 | −18.57 | 6.13 | Shane King | Labor |
| Keppel | Liberal National | Bruce Young | 6.39 | −11.19 | 4.80 | Brittany Lauga | Labor |
| Logan | Liberal National | Michael Pucci | 4.80 | −15.63 | 10.82 | Linus Power | Labor |
| Lytton | Liberal National | Neil Symes | 1.58 | −11.37 | 9.80 | Joan Pease | Labor |
| Maryborough | Liberal National | Anne Maddern | 0.31 | −1.96 | 1.65 | Bruce Saunders | Labor |
| Mirani | Liberal National | Ted Malone | 11.19 | −16.01 | 4.82 | Jim Pearce | Labor |
| Morayfield | Liberal National | Darren Grimwade | 5.57 | −17.49 | 11.91 | Mark Ryan | Labor |
| Mount Coot-tha | Liberal National | Saxon Rice | 5.36 | −7.94 | 2.59 | Steven Miles | Labor |
| Mundingburra | Liberal National | David Crisafulli | 10.19 | −12.95 | 2.76 | Coralee O'Rourke | Labor |
| Murrumba | Liberal National | Reg Gulley | 9.52 | −16.88 | 7.35 | Chris Whiting | Labor |
| Nudgee | Liberal National | Jason Woodforth | 3.11 | −14.36 | 11.25 | Leanne Linard | Labor |
| Pine Rivers | Liberal National | Seath Holswich | 13.66 | −21.34 | 7.68 | Nikki Boyd | Labor |
| Pumicestone | Liberal National | Lisa France | 12.07 | −14.16 | 2.08 | Rick Williams | Labor |
| Sandgate | Liberal National | Kerry Millard | 2.87 | −12.96 | 10.10 | Stirling Hinchliffe | Labor |
| Springwood | Liberal National | John Grant | 15.39 | −17.13 | 1.73 | Mick de Brenni | Labor |
| Stretton | Liberal National | Freya Ostapovitch | 9.55 | −14.54 | 4.98 | Duncan Pegg | Labor |
| Sunnybank | Liberal National | Mark Stewart | 10.23 | −17.42 | 7.19 | Peter Russo | Labor |
| Thuringowa | Liberal National | Sam Cox | 1.38 | −6.92 | 5.54 | Aaron Harper | Labor |
| Townsville | Liberal National | John Hathaway | 4.83 | −10.52 | 5.69 | Scott Stewart | Labor |
| Waterford | Liberal National | Mike Latter | 1.04 | −14.37 | 13.33 | Shannon Fentiman | Labor |
| Yeerongpilly | Liberal National | Carl Judge^{1} | 1.44 | −14.74 | 13.30 | Mark Bailey | Labor |

- Members listed in italics did not contest their seat at this election.
- ^{1} Carl Judge was elected as a member of the Liberal National Party, but resigned and contested the election as an independent.
- The Liberal National Party also retained the seat of Condamine, where the sitting member had resigned from the Liberal National Party, but contested Nanango as a member of Katter's Australian Party.
- The Liberal National Party also retained the seat of Gaven, where the sitting member had resigned from the Liberal National Party and contested the election as an independent.

== Post-election pendulum ==
Government seats
Marginal
| Ferny Grove | Mark Furner | ALP | 0.82% |
| Bundaberg | Leanne Donaldson | ALP | 1.62% |
| Maryborough | Bruce Saunders | ALP | 1.65% |
| Springwood | Mick de Brenni | ALP | 1.73% |
| Pumicestone | Rick Williams | ALP | 2.08% |
| Mount Coot-tha | Steven Miles | ALP | 2.59% |
| Mundingburra | Coralee O'Rourke | ALP | 2.76% |
| Barron River | Craig Crawford | ALP | 3.12% |
| Brisbane Central | Grace Grace | ALP | 3.25% |
| Greenslopes | Joe Kelly | ALP | 4.25% |
| Ashgrove | Kate Jones | ALP | 4.25% |
| Keppel | Brittany Lauga | ALP | 4.80% |
| Mirani | Jim Pearce | ALP | 4.82% |
| Stretton | Duncan Pegg | ALP | 4.98% |
| Thuringowa | Aaron Harper | ALP | 5.54% |
| Townsville | Scott Stewart | ALP | 5.69% |
Fairly safe
| Kallangur | Shane King | ALP | 6.13% |
| Bulimba | Di Farmer | ALP | 6.14% |
| Cook | Billy Gordon | ALP | 6.77% |
| Algester | Leeanne Enoch | ALP | 6.99% |
| Capalaba | Don Brown | ALP | 7.06% |
| Sunnybank | Peter Russo | ALP | 7.19% |
| Murrumba | Chris Whiting | ALP | 7.35% |
| Redcliffe | Yvette D'Ath | ALP | 7.58% |
| Pine Rivers | Nikki Boyd | ALP | 7.68% |
| Ipswich West | Jim Madden | ALP | 7.71% |
| Cairns | Rob Pyne | ALP | 8.45% |
| Stafford | Anthony Lynham | ALP | 9.59% |
| Lytton | Joan Pease | ALP | 9.80% |
Safe
| Sandgate | Stirling Hinchliffe | ALP | 10.10% |
| Logan | Linus Power | ALP | 10.82% |
| Nudgee | Leanne Linard | ALP | 11.25% |
| Morayfield | Mark Ryan | ALP | 11.91% |
| Gladstone | Glenn Butcher | ALP | 11.89% v IND |
| Mackay | Julieanne Gilbert | ALP | 12.39% |
| Mulgrave | Curtis Pitt | ALP | 12.76% |
| Yeerongpilly | Mark Bailey | ALP | 13.30% |
| Waterford | Shannon Fentiman | ALP | 13.33% |
| South Brisbane | Jackie Trad | ALP | 13.79% |
| Rockhampton | Bill Byrne | ALP | 13.87% |
| Ipswich | Jennifer Howard | ALP | 15.90% |
Very safe
| Bundamba | Jo-Ann Miller | ALP | 21.43% |
| Inala | Annastacia Palaszczuk | ALP | 25.12% |
| Woodridge | Cameron Dick | ALP | 25.95% |

Non-government seats
Marginal
| Lockyer | Ian Rickuss | LNP | 0.22% v ONP |
| Mount Ommaney | Tarnya Smith | LNP | 0.23% |
| Whitsunday | Jason Costigan | LNP | 0.38% |
| Mansfield | Ian Walker | LNP | 0.55% |
| Glass House | Andrew Powell | LNP | 1.41% |
| Toowoomba North | Trevor Watts | LNP | 1.61% |
| Albert | Mark Boothman | LNP | 1.67% |
| Everton | Tim Mander | LNP | 1.77% |
| Redlands | Matt McEachan | LNP | 2.23% |
| Gaven | Sid Cramp | LNP | 2.24% |
| Chatsworth | Steve Minnikin | LNP | 2.62% |
| Burdekin | Dale Last | LNP | 2.88% |
| Southport | Rob Molhoek | LNP | 3.24% |
| Caloundra | Mark McArdle | LNP | 3.82% |
| Aspley | Tracy Davis | LNP | 5.17% |
| Currumbin | Jann Stuckey | LNP | 5.23% |
| Cleveland | Mark Robinson | LNP | 5.45% |
Fairly safe
| Burleigh | Michael Hart | LNP | 6.16% |
| Hervey Bay | Ted Sorensen | LNP | 6.62% |
| Callide | Jeff Seeney | LNP | 6.67% v PUP |
| Indooroopilly | Scott Emerson | LNP | 6.73% |
| Burnett | Stephen Bennett | LNP | 6.80% |
| Gympie | Tony Perrett | LNP | 7.10% |
| Broadwater | Verity Barton | LNP | 7.19% |
| Clayfield | Tim Nicholls | LNP | 7.21% |
| Beaudesert | Jon Krause | LNP | 7.53% |
| Moggill | Christian Rowan | LNP | 8.21% |
| Coomera | Michael Crandon | LNP | 8.53% |
| Noosa | Glen Elmes | LNP | 8.62% v GRN |
| Toowoomba South | John McVeigh | LNP | 8.89% |
| Hinchinbrook | Andrew Cripps | LNP | 8.92% |
| Maroochydore | Fiona Simpson | LNP | 9.27% |
Safe
| Kawana | Jarrod Bleijie | LNP | 10.09% |
| Mudgeeraba | Ros Bates | LNP | 10.97% |
| Gregory | Lachlan Millar | LNP | 11.07% |
| Buderim | Steve Dickson | LNP | 12.16% |
| Mermaid Beach | Ray Stevens | LNP | 12.93% |
| Nanango | Deb Frecklington | LNP | 13.16% |
| Warrego | Ann Leahy | LNP | 15.43% |
| Condamine | Pat Weir | LNP | 16.28% |
| Southern Downs | Lawrence Springborg | LNP | 19.20% |
| Surfers Paradise | John-Paul Langbroek | LNP | 19.21% |
Crossbench seats
| Nicklin | Peter Wellington | IND | 14.89 v LNP |
| Dalrymple | Shane Knuth | KAP | 15.10 v LNP |
| Mount Isa | Robbie Katter | KAP | 15.19 v LNP |

== Subsequent changes ==
- On 31 March 2015, Billy Gordon (Cook) was expelled from the Labor Party and sat as an independent.
- On 8 March 2016, Rob Pyne (Cairns) resigned from the Labor Party and sat as an independent.
- On 29 April 2016, John McVeigh (Toowoomba South) resigned. At the by-election on 16 July 2016, David Janetzki retained the seat for the Liberal National Party.
- On 14 January 2017, Steve Dickson (Buderim) resigned from the Liberal National Party and joined the One Nation Party.
- On 29 October 2017, Rick Williams (Pumicestone) resigned from the Labor Party and sat as an independent.

== Aftermath ==
Labor regained power mainly on the strength of recovering much of what it had lost in Brisbane at the 2012 election. Brisbane had been Labor's power base for more than a quarter-century; Labor had gone into the 2012 election holding 36 of the capital's 40 seats, losing all but three at the election. In 2015, however, Labor won 28 seats in Brisbane. The LNP was still in a position to hope for a minority government primarily by sweeping the Gold Coast, albeit in most cases by somewhat smaller margins than in 2012.

Although Queensland is Australia's least centralised state, since the abolition of the Bjelkemander it has been extremely difficult to form even a minority government without a strong base in Brisbane. The 2015 election underscored this. None of the LNP's safe seats (greater than 10 percent 2PP) were located in Brisbane. The LNP's safest seat, Moggill, only had a majority of 8.2 percent, putting it on the strong side of fairly safe. In contrast, all but two of Labor's safe seats were in the capital.

Following the election, the Palmer United Party candidate for Ferny Grove, Mark Taverner, was revealed to be an undischarged bankrupt and was therefore ineligible to run. The revelation spurred speculation that there may need to be a by-election to resolve the seat. The Electoral Commission of Queensland initially released a statement on 8 February saying that it would declare the seat, and then refer the issue to the Supreme Court of Queensland sitting as the Court of Disputed Returns. The statement raised a by-election as a possible outcome.

Lawrence Springborg, who succeeded Newman as LNP leader on 7 February, called for the caretaker government to continue until after a possible Ferny Grove by-election is held, citing both the uncertainty of a hung parliament and doubt over the status of Ferny Grove. Conversely, ABC election analyst Antony Green believed that the Ferny Grove outcome and possible by-election would not affect who forms government. Professor Graeme Orr, an electoral law expert at University of Queensland, labelled the prospect of the LNP maintaining a caretaker government until a possible by-election analogous to a "constitutional coup". Orr also reasoned that the law and facts were against a Ferny Grove by-election. The Electoral Commission of Queensland declared Ferny Grove had been won by the Labor candidate Mark Furner over LNP incumbent Dale Shuttleworth on 11 February, signalling that it would soon refer the matter to the Court of Disputed Returns. Green analysed the Ferny Grove tally and concluded that Taverner did not have an effect on the outcome of the election. Specifically, Green concluded that at most, 353 of Taverner's ballot papers had exhausted. However, Furner would have still won even if all of those votes had gone to Shuttleworth had Taverner not been on the ballot. To Green's mind, this made it extremely difficult to argue that exhausted preferences alone would be enough to demand a by-election in Ferny Grove.

On 13 February the Electoral Commission of Queensland stated that, based on legal advice, they would not be referring the Ferny Grove result to the Court of Disputed Returns. This formally cleared the way for a Labor minority government, and Governor Paul de Jersey invited Palaszczuk to form a government later that day. The LNP stated they were considering their legal options, with Springborg later releasing a statement where he "congratulate[d] incoming Premier Annastacia Palaszczuk and her government". On 16 February the LNP announced it would not be challenging the Ferny Grove result.

== Opinion polling ==
=== Primary vote opinion polling graph ===
View source data.

=== Two-party preferred opinion polling graph ===
View source data.

=== Voting intention ===
| Date | Firm | Primary vote | | | | | | 2pp vote (Note: Resolve Strategic Poll 2PP calculated based on preference flows at the 2022 Australian federal election by the Poll Bludger, Kevin Bonham and the Federal 2PP estimator made by Armarium Interreta.) | |
| Date | Firm | LNP | ALP | GRN | PUP | KAP | OTH | LNP | ALP |
|---|---|---|---|---|---|---|---|---|---|
| 31 Jan 2015 | Election | 41.3% | 37.5% | 8.4% | 5.1% | 1.9% | 5.7% | 48.9% | 51.1% |
| 29 Jan 2015 | Essential | 39% | 38% | 7% | 5% | 2% | 9% | 50% | 50% |
| 29 Jan 2015 | Newspoll | 41% | 37% | 6% | 3% | 2% | 11% | 52% | 48% |
| 29 Jan 2015 | Galaxy | 38% | 39% | 10% | 5% | 2% | 10% | 46% | 54% |
| 20 Jan 2015 | ReachTEL | 42% | 36.7% | 8.4% | 5.2% | —N/a | 7.6% | 52% | 48% |
| 16–18 Jan 2015 | Roy Morgan | 39.5% | 37% | 10% | 4% | 3.5% | 6% | 50.5% | 49.5% |
| 7–8 Jan 2015 | Galaxy | 41% | 38% | 8% | 3% | 3% | 7% | 52% | 48% |
| 6–8 Jan 2015 | Newspoll | 42% | 37% | 7% | 1% | 1% | 12% | 53% | 47% |
| 6 Jan 2015 | ReachTEL | 40.3% | 38.1% | 7.6% | 6.3% | —N/a | 7.7% | 50% | 50% |
| 28 Nov 2014 | ReachTEL | 39.2% | 37.3% | 7.9% | 6.5% | —N/a | 9.1% | 49% | 51% |
| 21–24 Nov 2014 | Roy Morgan | 39% | 36.5% | 9.5% | 4% | 3.5% | 7.5% | 50.5% | 49.5% |
| 18–19 Nov 2014 | Galaxy | 37% | 38% | 9% | 7% | 3% | 6% | 50% | 50% |
| Oct–Dec 2014 | Newspoll | 37% | 36% | 10% | —N/a | 1% (Note: KAP is not offered as a choice on Newspoll, individuals must nominate them, as such KAP is included as "Others".) | 16% | 50% | 50% |
| 24–27 Oct 2014 | Roy Morgan | 38.5% | 38% | 10% | 6% | 2% | 5.5% | 49.5% | 50.5% |
| 9 Oct 2014 | ReachTEL | 40.9% | 36.6% | 7.6% | 7.2% | —N/a | 7.7% | 51% | 49% |
| 26–29 Sept 2014 | Roy Morgan | 42% | 35.5% | 9% | 6.5% | 2.5% | 4.5% | 51% | 49% |
| 4 Sept 2014 | ReachTEL | 41.2% | 36% | 6% | 9.5% | —N/a | 7.2% | 51% | 49% |
| 12–14 Aug 2014 | Galaxy | 39% | 36% | 7% | 12% | 3% | 3% | 52% | 48% |
| Jul–Sep 2014 | Newspoll | 39% | 32% | 10% | —N/a | 1% | 18% | 54% | 46% |
| 7 Aug 2014 | ReachTEL | 41% | 34.4% | 5.5% | 12.6% | —N/a | 6.5% | 52% | 48% |
| 3 Jul 2014 | ReachTEL | 38.7% | 34.4% | 6.1% | 15.4% | —N/a | 5.4% | 51% | 49% |
| 5 Jun 2014 | ReachTEL | 40.9% | 34.1% | 5.2% | 13.6% | —N/a | 6.3% | 53% | 47% |
| 21–22 May 2014 | Galaxy | 43% | 34% | 8% | —N/a | 5% | 10% | 55% | 45% |
| Apr–Jun 2014 | Newspoll | 32% | 34% | 8% | —N/a | 2% | 24% | 49% | 51% |
| 2 Apr 2014 | ReachTEL | 39.1% | 35.1% | 7.3% | 8.0% | 3.3% | 3.0% | — | — |
| Jan–Mar 2014 | Newspoll | 40% | 36% | 8% | —N/a | 1% | 15% | 52% | 48% |
| Oct–Dec 2013 | Newspoll | 40% | 32% | 8% | —N/a | 2% | 18% | 55% | 45% |
| 10 Jul 2013 | ReachTEL | 43.3% | 37.0% | 5.1% | 4.5% | 5.7% | 4.4% | — | — |
| 23 May 2013 | ReachTEL | 44.6% | 28.2% | 9.0% | —N/a | 10.4% | 7.8% | — | — |
| Apr–Jun 2013 | Newspoll | 44% | 29% | 10% | —N/a | 3% | 14% | 59% | 41% |
| 19 Apr 2013 | ReachTEL | 45.1% | 29.2% | 7.7% | —N/a | 12.7% | 5.4% | — | — |
| 23 Mar – 2 Apr 2013 | ReachTEL | 45.8% | 30.4% | 8.2% | —N/a | 9.9% | 5.6% | — | — |
| 20 Mar 2013 | ReachTEL | 47.8% | 30.2% | 8.0% | —N/a | 10.1% | 3.9% | — | — |
| 22 Feb 2013 | ReachTEL | 47.1% | 28.9% | 7.9% | —N/a | 11.5% | 4.5% | — | — |
| Jan–Mar 2013 | Newspoll | 49% | 27% | 6% | —N/a | 3% | 15% | 62% | 38% |
| 18 Jan 2013 | ReachTEL | 42.5% | 34.9% | 8.4% | —N/a | 10.5% | 3.6% | — | — |
| 14 Dec 2012 | ReachTEL | 41.9% | 32.1% | 8.2% | —N/a | 12.1% | 5.7% | — | — |
| 23 Nov 2012 | ReachTEL | 42% | 34.2% | 9.5% | —N/a | 8.9% | 5.4% | — | — |
| Oct–Dec 2012 | Newspoll | 42% | 31% | 8% | —N/a | 4% | 15% | 56% | 44% |
| 12 Oct 2012 | ReachTEL | 44.6% | 30.5% | 7.5% | —N/a | 11% | 6.4% | — | — |
| 14 Sept 2012 | ReachTEL | 44.7% | 34.7% | 7% | —N/a | 9.4% | 4.1% | — | — |
| 17 Aug 2012 | ReachTEL | 44.2% | 31.6% | 9.2% | —N/a | 9.6% | 5.4% | — | — |
| 10/11 Jul & 7/8, 14/15 Aug 2012 | Roy Morgan | 51% | 27.5% | 7.5% | —N/a | 5% | 9% | 59% | 41% |
| 2 Jul 2012 | ReachTEL | 56.5% | 21.8% | 9.4% | —N/a | 7.4% | 4.8% | — | — |
| Jul–Sep 2012 | Newspoll | 48% | 30% | 9% | —N/a | 1% | 12% | 60% | 40% |
| 5/6 & 12/13 June 2012 | Roy Morgan | 54.5% | 28% | 7.5% | —N/a | 3.5% | 6.5% | 62% | 38% |
| 28 Mar 2012 | Annastacia Palaszczuk elected as Leader of the Labor Party | | | | | | | | |
| 24 Mar 2012 | Election | 49.7% | 26.7% | 7.5% | — | 11.5% | 4.6% | 62.8% | 37.2% |
| 20–22 Mar 2012 | Newspoll | 50% | 28% | 6% | —N/a | | 16% | 60.8% | 39.2% |
| 20–21 Mar 2012 | Roy Morgan | 51% | 28% | 7.5% | —N/a | 8.5% | 5% | 62% | 38% |

=== Better Premier ===
View source data.

==== Approval ratings ====
View source data.

Better Premier and satisfaction polling*
| Date | Firm | Better Premier | | Newman | | Palaszczuk |
| Date | Firm | Newman | Palaszczuk | Satisfied | Dissatisfied | Satisfied | Dissatisfied |
|---|---|---|---|---|---|---|---|
| 27–29 Jan 2015 | Newspoll | 43% | 42% | 35% | 58% | 38% | 40% |
| 16–18 Jan 2015 | Roy Morgan | 48.5% | 51.5% | not asked |
| 6–8 Jan 2015 | Newspoll | 42% | 38% | 41% | 51% | 38% | 38% |
| 21–24 Nov 2014 | Roy Morgan | 47.5% | 52.5% | not asked |
| Oct–Dec 2014 | Newspoll | 44% | 35% | 38% | 51% | 38% | 34% |
| 24–27 Oct 2014 | Roy Morgan | 47.5% | 52.5% | not asked |
| 26–29 Sept 2014 | Roy Morgan | 50% | 50% | not asked |
| Jul–Sep 2014 | Newspoll | 41% | 35% | 35% | 54% | 36% | 36% |
| Apr–Jun 2014 | Newspoll | 39% | 35% | 33% | 57% | 35% | 37% |
| Jan–Mar 2014 | Newspoll | 41% | 35% | 36% | 54% | 38% | 30% |
| Oct–Dec 2013 | Newspoll | 45% | 32% | 40% | 48% | 36% | 31% |
| Apr–Jun 2013 | Newspoll | 49% | 26% | 41% | 46% | 34% | 33% |
| Jan–Mar 2013 | Newspoll | 53% | 21% | 43% | 45% | 33% | 33% |
| Oct–Dec 2012 | Newspoll | 45% | 29% | 38% | 48% | 34% | 30% |
| 10/11 Jul & 7/8, 14/15 Aug 2012 | Roy Morgan | 62.5% | 20.5% | 51% | 36% | 33% | 28.5% |
| Jul–Sep 2012 | Newspoll | 55% | 21% | 47% | 38% | 29% | 30% |
| 5/6 & 12/13 June 2012 | Roy Morgan | 67.5% | 16% | 53% | 26.5% | 26.5% | 21% |
| 28 March 2012 Palaszczuk replaces Bligh | | Newman | Bligh | Newman | | Bligh |
| 24 Mar 2012 election | | – | – | – | – | – | – |
| 20–22 Mar 2012 | Newspoll | 51% | 36% | 47% | 40% | 36% | 58% |
| 20–21 Mar 2012 | Roy Morgan | 48% | 35% | 53% | 34.5% | 38.5% | 53.5% |
* Remainder were "uncommitted" or "other/neither".
Newspoll polling is published in The Australian and sourced from here

Polling conducted by Newspoll and published in The Australian is conducted via random telephone number selection in city and country areas. Sampling sizes usually consist of around 1100–1200 electors. The declared margin of error is ±3 percentage points.

Polling conducted by Newspoll and published in The Australian is conducted via random telephone number selection in city and country areas. Sampling sizes usually consist of around 1100–1200 electors. The declared margin of error is ±3 percentage points.

== See also ==
- Candidates of the 2015 Queensland state election
- Members of the Queensland Legislative Assembly, 2015–2018
- Politics of Queensland
