= 2006 Toowoomba Water Futures referendum =

On 29 July 2006, the City of Toowoomba, Queensland, Australia held a referendum on the controversial issue of using recycled water from the city's sewers as a source for drinking water.

This proposal, the public debate, the referendum and associated campaigns for both the "Yes" and "No" positions, attracted statewide and national interest.

The "Yes" position, championed by the mayor of Toowoomba, Di Thorley, and backed by the council staff and Toowoomba Water Futures project, faced opposition from a minority of councillors led by Councillor Lyle Shelton (Who unsuccessfully ran as a National Party candidate for Toowoomba North in the 2006 Queensland state election) and former mayor and MLA for Toowoomba South Clive Berghofer and grassroots campaigner Rosemary Morley.

== Background ==
Changing weather patterns, a drought, and insufficient investment in water infrastructure in the 20th century by both Toowoomba City Council and the Queensland Government led to increasingly severe water restrictions in the "Garden City". Using town water on lawns, and eventually gardens and potted plants was banned under a series of ever harsher water restrictions.

A proposal to recycle water from the city's sewerage system, add salts to prevent the ultra pure water damaging concrete water pipes, pump it to the city's dams, then redraw it for domestic (drinking water) use was initially supported unanimously by the mayor and councillors, and by the local Federal Member Ian Macfarlane seat of Groom, which covers most of Toowoomba.

State and Federal governmental support from both Labor and coalition politicians was also strong.

== The debate ==
The situation was complicated by growing resentment at perceived heavy-handedness from outside "celebrities" and leaders such as Commonwealth Water Minister Malcolm Turnbull who tied federal funding exclusively to the recycling project.

Lyle Shelton and two other councilors switched to opposing the proposal, as did Ian Macfarlane saying that "No" campaigner, millionaire property developer Clive Berghofer "had a right to be heard".

The lead up to the poll was marked by misinformation, dirty tricks and an alleged whispering campaign by some members of the Toowoomba City Council. Unsourced claims in the whispering campaign included a kick-back (of $11 million) to the Mayor; questions about the Mayor moving to Tasmania; and the engineering firm behind the project being a Halliburton subsidiary. There was a threatened exodus from the city should the recycled water begin flowing.

Much was made about the risk of loss of equity in homes as house prices would tumble should Toowoomba embrace recycled water.

== The poll ==
The proposal was defeated on Saturday, 29 July 2006 by 62% to 38%. In 2007, the Mayor (Di Thorley) announced she was moving to Tasmania.
