= Electoral results for the district of Toohey =

Queensland, Australia, district election results

This is a list of electoral results for the electoral district of Toohey in Queensland state elections.

== Members for Toohey ==
Member	Party	Term
Peter Russo	Labor	2017–present

== Election results ==
=== Elections in the 2020s ===
2024 Queensland state election: Toohey
Party	Candidate	Votes	%	±%
Labor	Peter Russo	12,319	41.8	−8.7
Liberal National	Taylor Hull	10,251	34.8	+4.7
Greens	Melissa McArdle	5,463	18.5	+6.0
One Nation	Hayden O'Brien	1,457	4.9	+1.7
Total formal votes		29,490	96.4	
Informal votes		1,113	3.6	
Turnout		30,603		
Two-party-preferred result
Labor	Peter Russo	17,408	59.0	−5.5
Liberal National	Taylor Hull	12,082	41.0	+5.5
Labor hold		Swing	-5.5	

2020 Queensland state election: Toohey
Party	Candidate	Votes	%	±%
Labor	Peter Russo	14,591	50.41	+5.80
Liberal National	Warren Craze	8,706	30.08	−0.19
Greens	Claire Garton	3,636	12.56	−2.06
Legalise Cannabis	Nikolas Peterson	1,072	3.70	+3.70
One Nation	Claudia Roel	939	3.24	−7.25
Total formal votes		28,944	96.69	+1.52
Informal votes		990	3.31	−1.52
Turnout		29,934	87.98	+1.84
Two-party-preferred result
Labor	Peter Russo	18,674	64.52	+4.50
Liberal National	Warren Craze	10,270	35.48	−4.50
Labor hold		Swing	+4.50	

=== Elections in the 2010s ===
2017 Queensland state election: Toohey
Party	Candidate	Votes	%	±%
Labor	Peter Russo	12,284	44.6	−1.3
Liberal National	Anthony Shorten	8,336	30.3	−7.1
Greens	Gordon King	4,026	14.6	+2.9
One Nation	Guansheng (Victor) Zhang	2,891	10.5	+10.5
Total formal votes		27,537	95.2	−2.7
Informal votes		1,398	4.8	+2.7
Turnout		28,935	86.1	−1.6
Two-party-preferred result
Labor	Peter Russo	16,526	60.0	+1.7
Liberal National	Anthony Shorten	11,011	40.0	−1.7
Labor hold		Swing	+1.7	
