= Di Thorley =

Australian politician

Dianne "Di" Thorley AM (born 1 December 1949 in Stanthorpe, Queensland) is an Australian politician and a former mayor of Toowoomba, Queensland.

== Biography ==
Thorley trained as a nurse in Brisbane and later took up a nursing position at Stanthorpe Hospital. She also spent some time working as a governess in Blackall. She moved to Toowoomba in 1986, where she worked and owned a number of businesses in the local hospitality industry.

Thorley was elected as a Councillor on Toowoomba City Council in 1997 and became mayor in 2000. She was returned to office for a second term in 2004.

On 26 June 2007, Thorley confirmed that she would not seek re-election for mayor in March 2008, or any other council position.

Thorley spent time running The Lady Franklin Hotel in Franklin, Tasmania before returning to Queensland. In 2016, Thorley ran as an independent candidate in a by-election for the Electoral district of Toowoomba South in the Queensland Legislative Assembly.

== Toowoomba Water Futures ==
In light of the region's worst drought in a hundred years, which saw the city's dam storages fall below 25% capacity, in 2006 Mayor Di Thorley championed a plan (Toowoomba Water Futures) to build a recycled sewage plant that would process the city's sewage and use the resulting water for re-use. Because of health and public concerns, the recovered sewage water was to be pumped into one of the city's dams that provide drinking water, where it would be allowed to mix with rainwater collected by the dam, before being redrawn and retreated for distribution to homes. The project was controversial as the first of its kind to be proposed in Australia.

A referendum determining community support for the project was held on 29 July 2006 in which a majority (61.87% of voters) said "No" to the proposal.

Civic offices
| Preceded by Tony Bourke | Mayor of Toowoomba; 2000–2008 | Succeeded by Peter Taylor as mayor of the Toowoomba Regional Council |
