= Electoral district of Toohey =

State electoral district of Queensland, Australia

Toohey Queensland—Legislative Assembly
- Electoral map of Toohey 2017
- State: Queensland
- Dates current: 2017–present
- MP: Peter Russo
- Party: Labor Party
- Namesake: Toohey Forest Park
- Electors: 34,022 (2020)
- Area: 36 km^{2} (13.9 sq mi)
- Demographic: Outer-metropolitan
- Coordinates: 27.5652°S 153.0509°E
Electorates around Toohey:
Miller	Greenslopes	Mansfield
Algester	Toohey	Mansfield
Stretton	Waterford	Springwood

Toohey is an electoral district of the Legislative Assembly in the Australian state of Queensland. It was created in the 2017 redistribution. It was named after Toohey Forest Park.

It largely covers the area of the abolished district of Sunnybank. Located in southern Brisbane, Toohey consists of the suburbs of Moorooka, Rocklea, Salisbury, Nathan, Coopers Plains, Robertson, MacGregor, Sunnybank, Runcorn and Eight Mile Plains.

From results of the 2015 election, Toohey was estimated to be a fairly safe seat for the Labor Party with a margin of 8.3%.

== Members for Toohey ==
Member	Party	Term
Peter Russo	Labor	2017–present

== Election results ==
2024 Queensland state election: Toohey
Party	Candidate	Votes	%	±%
Labor	Peter Russo	12,319	41.8	−8.7
Liberal National	Taylor Hull	10,251	34.8	+4.7
Greens	Melissa McArdle	5,463	18.5	+6.0
One Nation	Hayden O'Brien	1,457	4.9	+1.7
Total formal votes		29,490	96.4	
Informal votes		1,113	3.6	
Turnout		30,603		
Two-party-preferred result
Labor	Peter Russo	17,408	59.0	−5.5
Liberal National	Taylor Hull	12,082	41.0	+5.5
Labor hold		Swing	-5.5	

== See also ==
- Electoral districts of Queensland
- Members of the Queensland Legislative Assembly by year
- Category:Members of the Queensland Legislative Assembly by name
