= Mike Horan (politician) =

Australian politician

The Hon Mike Horan AM

Leader of the Opposition of Queensland Leader of the Queensland National Party
- In office 2 March 2001 – 4 February 2003
- Deputy: Vaughan Johnson
- Preceded by: Rob Borbidge
- Succeeded by: Lawrence Springborg

Shadow Attorney-General Shadow Minister for Justice
- In office 30 September 2008 – 5 April 2009
- Leader: Lawrence Springborg
- Preceded by: Stuart Copeland
- Succeeded by: Lawrence Springborg

Shadow Minister for Food Security and Agriculture
- In office 12 August 2008 – 30 September 2008
- Leader: Lawrence Springborg
- Preceded by: New Position
- Succeeded by: Ray Hopper

Shadow Minister for Fisheries
- In office 8 March 2004 – 30 September 2008
- Leader: Lawrence Springborg; Jeff Seeney
- Preceded by: Position Vacated
- Succeeded by: Ray Hopper

Shadow Minister for Primary Industries
- In office 8 March 2004 – 12 August 2008
- Leader: Lawrence Springborg; Jeff Seeney
- Preceded by: Marc Rowell
- Succeeded by: Position Vacant

Shadow Minister for State Development and Small Business
- In office 9 February 2003 – 8 March 2004
- Leader: Lawrence Springborg
- Preceded by: Vaughan Johnson
- Succeeded by: Howard Hobbs

Shadow Treasurer of Queensland
- In office 2 March 2001 – 9 February 2003
- Leader: Himself
- Preceded by: David Watson
- Succeeded by: Jeff Seeney

Shadow Minister for Police and Corrective Services of Queensland
- In office 26 February 1999 – 2 March 2001
- Leader: Rob Borbidge
- Preceded by: Allan Grice
- Succeeded by: Jeff Seeney

Shadow Minister for State Development, Trade and Rural Communities of Queensland
- In office 2 July 1998 – 26 February 1999
- Leader: Rob Borbidge
- Preceded by: Peter Beattie
- Succeeded by: Doug Slack

Deputy Leader of the Queensland National Party
- In office 17 February 1998 – 26 February 1999
- Leader: Rob Borbidge
- Preceded by: Kev Lingard
- Succeeded by: Lawrence Springborg

Minister for Health of Queensland
- In office 26 February 1996 – 26 June 1998
- Premier: Rob Borbidge
- Preceded by: Peter Beattie
- Succeeded by: Wendy Edmond

Shadow Minister for Health
- In office 5 November 1992 – 19 February 1996
- Leader: Rob Borbidge
- Preceded by: Di McCauley
- Succeeded by: Wendy Edmond

Member of the Queensland Legislative Assembly for Toowoomba South
- In office 18 May 1991 – 24 March 2012
- Preceded by: Clive Berghofer
- Succeeded by: John McVeigh

Personal details
- Born: Michael James Horan; 1 July 1944 (age 82) Brisbane, Queensland, Australia
- Party: Liberal National Party
- Other political affiliations: National Party
- Spouse: Helen Horan
- Relations: Tim Horan (son), Matthew Horan (son), Emma Campbell (Daughter)
- Education: University of Queensland
- Occupation: General Manager, Farmer

Michael James Horan, AM (born 1 July 1944) is a former Australian politician who represented the seat of Toowoomba South in the Legislative Assembly of Queensland from 18 May 1991 to 24 March 2012. Originally he was a member of the National Party of Australia, but follow its merger he sat as a member of the Liberal National Party of Queensland until his retirement.

== Early life ==
Prior to entering parliament, Horan was employed as the General Manager of the Royal Agricultural Society of Queensland and General Manager of the Toowoomba Greyhound Racing Club.

== Political career ==
Horan entered politics at the 1991 Toowoomba South by-election. He replaced property developer and Toowoomba Mayor Clive Berghofer, who had previously held the seat for the National Party until the state's electoral laws were amended to prevent simultaneous service in state parliamentary and local government authority positions.

=== Government Minister (1996–98) ===
Horan served as Health Minister in the Borbidge Government 1996–98, and as Deputy Nationals leader between 1998 and 1999.

=== Opposition Leader (2001–03) ===
Horan was made leader of the National Party and Opposition on 2 March 2001 until after Rob Borbidge's retirement from politics. He defeated his successor as deputy leader Lawrence Springborg by 6 votes to 5 with Borbidge not voting.

He was replaced as leader by Springborg on 4 February 2003 after he failed to gain ground on Peter Beattie.

Horan became the first leader of his party who did not become Premier since Ted Maher (served 1936-41 when the party was then called the Country Party).

=== Post Leadership (2003–12) ===
He became a member of the Liberal National Party of Queensland in 2008 and served in the Queensland Parliament as Shadow Attorney-General, Shadow Minister for Justice and Racing, Shadow Minister for Open Government between 30 September 2008 and 5 April 2009. On 6 April 2009, he was appointed to the position of Opposition Whip.

Horan stood down at the 2012 state election.

== Personal life ==
Horan captained the Australian Universities rugby union team, and played for the Parramatta Eels rugby league team in Sydney from 1968 to 1970, before moving to Gympie, Queensland to run a dairy farm.

Horan is married with two sons and a daughter. His son, Tim Horan, is a former Australian rugby union footballer.

Horan is of Irish descent from County Galway.

Parliament of Queensland
Preceded by Clive Berghofer	Member for Toowoomba South; 1991–2012	Succeeded by John McVeigh
Political offices
Preceded by Peter Beattie	Minister for Health; 1996–1998	Succeeded by Wendy Edmond
Party political offices
Preceded by Rob Borbidge	Leader of the National Party in Queensland; 2001–2003	Succeeded by Lawrence Springborg
