= John Warner (Australian politician) =

Australian politician

The Honourable John Warner

Speaker of the Queensland Legislative Assembly
- In office 22 November 1983 – 1 November 1986
- Preceded by: Selwyn Muller
- Succeeded by: Kev Lingard

Member of the Queensland Legislative Assembly for Toowoomba South
- In office 7 December 1974 – 1 November 1986
- Preceded by: Peter Wood
- Succeeded by: Clive Berghofer

Personal details
- Born: John Herbert Warner; 26 November 1923 Sydney, New South Wales, Australia
- Died: 20 September 1991 (aged 67) Toowoomba, Queensland, Australia
- Party: National Party
- Spouse: Mary Sword (m.1949)
- Occupation: Farmer and grazier

John Herbert Warner (26 November 1923 – 20 September 1991) was a member of the Queensland Legislative Assembly.

== Biography ==
Warner was born in Sydney, New South Wales, the son of A.F. Warner and his wife Elizabeth Hazel (née Hollis) and was educated at The King's School, Parramatta. He worked as a farmer and grazier and in World War II served with the RAAF as a Flight Officer-Pilot working in the Pacific and USA operating air-sea rescues.

He married Mary Alison Sword in 1949 and together had three sons and a daughter. Warner died in Toowoomba in September 1991.

== Public career ==
Warner won the seat of Toowoomba South for the Country Party at the 1974 Queensland state election, defeating the sitting member Peter Wood of the Labor. He represented the electorate for almost twelve years, retiring from politics in 1986.

Warner was the Speaker of the Legislative Assembly of Queensland from 1983 until 1986.

Parliament of Queensland
Preceded by Selwyn Muller	Speaker of the Legislative Assembly; 1983–1986	Succeeded by Kev Lingard
Preceded by Peter Wood	Member for Toowoomba South; 1974–1986	Succeeded by Clive Berghofer
