= 2016 Toowoomba South state by-election =

Queensland state by-election

- 16 July 2016
	First party	Second party
		IND
Candidate	David Janetzki	Di Thorley
Party	Liberal National	Independent
Popular vote	13,005	9,827
Percentage	46.37%	35.04%
Swing	▼8.96pp	▲35.04pp
TPP	55.59%	44.41%
TPP swing	▼10.07pp	▲44.1pp
MP before election
John McVeigh
Liberal National
Elected MP
David Janetzki
Liberal National

A by-election was conducted for the Queensland Legislative Assembly seat of Toowoomba South on 16 July 2016, following the 29 April resignation of LNP MP John McVeigh. McVeigh resigned after he was preselected as the LNP candidate for the federal division of Groom at the 2016 federal election.

== Nominations ==
The six candidates in ballot paper order are as follows:

Candidate nominations
Party	Candidate	Background
Katter's Australian Party	Ken Elliott	Teacher.
Liberal National Party	David Janetzki	Corporate lawyer and head of banking at Heritage Bank.
Independent	Di Thorley	Former nurse and city councillor, mayor of Toowoomba from 2000 to 2007.
Independent	Rob Berry	Real estate agent and former business development bank manager.
Family First Party	Alexandra Todd	Designer with a degree in architecture. Candidate for Groom at the 2013 federal election.
Queensland Greens	Ken Gover	Dentist. Contested Toowoomba North at the 2015 Queensland state election.

== Result ==
Toowoomba South state by-election, 16 July 2016
Party	Candidate	Votes	%	±%
Liberal National	David Janetzki	13,005	46.37	−8.96
Independent	Di Thorley	9,827	35.04	+35.04
Family First	Alexandra Todd	2,019	7.20	+7.20
Greens	Ken Gover	1,519	5.42	−4.44
Katter's Australian	Ken Elliott	1,188	4.24	+4.24
Independent	Rob Berry	486	1.73	+1.73
Total formal votes		28,044	96.76	−0.79
Informal votes		940	3.24	+0.79
Turnout		28,984	83.49	−8.80
Two-candidate-preferred result
Liberal National	David Janetzki	15,591	55.59	−10.07
Independent	Di Thorley	12,453	44.41	+44.41
Liberal National hold		Swing	n/a	
