= Clive Berghofer =

Australian politician and philanthropist (born 1935)

Clive Berghofer AO

Member of the Queensland Legislative Assembly for Toowoomba South
- In office 1 November 1986 – 23 March 1991
- Preceded by: John Warner
- Succeeded by: Mike Horan

Personal details
- Born: Clive John Berghofer; 4 May 1935 (age 91) Toowoomba, Queensland, Australia
- Party: Liberal National
- Occupation: Managing Director, Land developer

Clive John Berghofer (born 4 May 1935) is an Australian property developer, politician and philanthropist. He has served as a member of the Queensland Legislative Assembly and mayor of Toowoomba.

== Early life ==
Clive Berghofer was born on 4 May 1935 in Toowoomba, Queensland, Australia. He grew up on a farm at Wellcamp during World War II, attending Wellcamp State School until leaving at age 13 to work at a sawmill.

== Career ==
In 1964, Berghofer purchased his first block of land in Toowoomba. He then built the Wilsonton Hotel in 1972 and the Wilsonton Shopping Centre in 1976, which he then subsequently sold to Multiplex in 2006.

He served as an alderman on Toowoomba City Council from 1973 to 1982, serving as Toowoomba's 61st Mayor from 1982 to 1992. He was the National Party MLA for Toowoomba South from 1986 to 1991. On 23 March 1991, he was forced to vacate his seat in the Queensland Legislative Assembly, in order to retain his position as mayor after changes to the relevant legislation. National Party candidate Mike Horan won the resulting by-election on 18 May.

He now works as a real estate developer in his hometown of Toowoomba. Additionally, he owns apartments in Brisbane and the Gold Coast.

== Philanthropy ==
Berghofer has made donations to CareFlight (now LifeFlight), a Queensland aero-medical rescue charity. As a result, some of their rescue aircraft garnish his name.

He has also donated to the Queensland Institute of Medical Research multiple times, including a 1997 donation of $20 million to fund a new cancer research centre, and a 2013 donation of $50.1 million. The institute was renamed in 2013 to QIMR Berghofer in his honour.

In 2015, Berghofer said that he 'gave away $50,000 a week'. Several other buildings and venues are named after him, including Clive Berghofer Stadium, the Clive Berghofer Arena at St Mary's College, and the Clive Berghofer Maintenance Centre, a hangar for the LifeFlight helicopter fleet. The Monthly contributor Lech Blaine dubbed him the "Donald Trump of the Darling Downs".

== Honours ==
- Medal of the Order of Australia, 26 January 1994, "in recognition of service to local government and to the community."
- Australian Sports Medal, 30 August 2000, "does not play sport but supports many clubs. Acts as guarantor for clubs seeking to build facilities."
- Centenary Medal, 1 January 2001, "for distinguished service to the community through funding research."
- Member of the Order of Australia, 12 June 2006, "for service to the community through philanthropic support for medical research, health, sporting and educational organisations in Queensland."
- Queensland Business Leaders Hall of Fame Award 2022, "in recognition of ground-breaking contributions to the Toowoomba region through pioneering property development and construction, civic leadership, and nationally significant and diverse philanthropy."
- Officer of the Order of Australia, 9 June 2025, "for distinguished service to the community of Queensland through philanthropic support of health and emergency services, sporting and educational organisations."

== Personal life ==
Berghofer currently resides in his hometown of Toowoomba. His net worth was estimated to be $344 million in 2023.

== See also ==
- Members of the Queensland Legislative Assembly, 1986-1989
- Members of the Queensland Legislative Assembly, 1989-1992
- Toowoomba (The seat of Toowoomba South lies in the city's southern suburbs and urban fringe.)

Parliament of Queensland
Preceded by John Warner	Member for Toowoomba South; 1986–1991	Succeeded by Mike Horan
