= Mark Stewart (politician) =

Australian politician

Member of the Queensland Parliament for Sunnybank
- In office 24 March 2012 – 31 January 2015
- Preceded by: Judy Spence
- Succeeded by: Peter Russo

Personal details
- Born: 16 August 1979 (age 46)
- Political party: Liberal National Party

Mark Adrian Stewart (born 16 August 1979) is an Australian Liberal National politician who was the member of the Legislative Assembly of Queensland for Sunnybank from 2012 to 2015.

Parliament of Queensland
Preceded by Judy Spence	Member for Sunnybank; 2012–2015	Succeeded by Peter Russo
