= Electoral district of Morayfield =

State electoral district of Queensland, Australia

Morayfield Queensland—Legislative Assembly
- Electoral map of Morayfield 2017
- State: Queensland
- Dates current: 2009–present
- MP: Mark Ryan
- Party: Labor
- Namesake: Morayfield
- Electors: 36,991 (2020)
- Area: 69 km^{2} (26.6 sq mi)
- Demographic: Outer-metropolitan
- Coordinates: 27°8′S 152°55′E
Electorates around Morayfield:
Glass House	Pumicestone	Pumicestone
Glass House	Morayfield	Bancroft
Kurwongbah	Kurwongbah	Kurwongbah

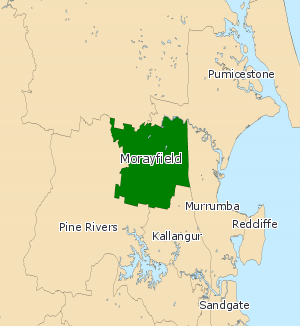
Electoral map of Morayfield

Morayfield is an electoral district of the Legislative Assembly in the Australian state of Queensland. It is located in the northern outskirts of Brisbane, wholly within the city of Moreton Bay.

== Geography ==
An outer suburban electorate, Morayfield lies west of the Bruce Highway and south of the Caboolture River. The northern end of the district takes in the suburb of Morayfield and the southern part of Caboolture. At its southern end, the district includes parts of the suburbs of Burpengary and Narangba.

== History ==
A new district created for the 2009 state election, it was constructed mostly from the northern part of the district of Kallangur and the western part of the district of Pumicestone. It also took a section of territory previously belonging to the district of Kurwongbah. Its inaugural member was Mark Ryan of the Labor Party, who was defeated by Darren Grimwade of the Liberal National Party in 2012.

== Members for Morayfield ==
Image	Member	Party	Term	Notes
	Mark Ryan (1982–)	Labor	21 March 2009 – 24 March 2012	Lost seat
	Darren Grimwade (1980–)	Liberal National	24 March 2012 – 31 January 2015	Lost seat
	Mark Ryan (1982–)	Labor	31 January 2015 – present	Minister under Palaszczuk and Miles. Incumbent

== Election results ==
2024 Queensland state election: Morayfield
Party	Candidate	Votes	%	±%
Labor	Mark Ryan	15,479	45.25	−9.15
Liberal National	Sarah Ross	9,786	28.61	+6.91
One Nation	Rodney Hansen	3,869	11.31	−0.59
Greens	Mark Jessup	2,338	6.83	−1.07
Legalise Cannabis	Frank Jordan	1,750	5.12	+5.12
Family First	Suniti Hewett	986	2.88	+2.88
Total formal votes		34,208	94.87	
Informal votes		1,850	5.13	
Turnout		36,058	85.15	
Two-party-preferred result
Labor	Mark Ryan	19,520	57.06	−9.74
Liberal National	Sarah Ross	14,688	42.94	+9.74
Labor hold		Swing	-9.74	
