= David Janetzki =

Australian politician

The Honourable David Janetzki MP

52nd Treasurer of Queensland
- Incumbent
- Assumed office 1 November 2024
- Premier: David Crisafulli
- Preceded by: Cameron Dick

Minister for Energy of Queensland
- Incumbent
- Assumed office 1 November 2024
- Premier: David Crisafulli
- Preceded by: Mick de Brenni (as Minister for Energy and Clean Economy Jobs)

Minister for Home Ownership of Queensland
- Incumbent
- Assumed office 1 November 2024
- Premier: David Crisafulli
- Preceded by: Position established
Shadow ministerial positions
Shadow Treasurer of Queensland Shadow Minister for Investment and Trade
In office 16 November 2020 – 28 October 2024
Leader	David Crisafulli
Preceded by	Tim Mander
Succeeded by	Shannon Fentiman (as Shadow Treasurer); Grace Grace (as Shadow Minister for Trade)
Deputy Leader of the Opposition in Queensland Deputy Leader of the Liberal National Party
In office 12 November 2020 – 13 March 2022
Leader	David Crisafulli
Preceded by	Tim Mander
Succeeded by	Jarrod Bleijie
Shadow Attorney-General Shadow Minister for Justice
In office 15 December 2017 – 16 November 2020
Leader	Deb Frecklington
Preceded by	Ian Walker
Succeeded by	Tim Nicholls

Member of the Queensland Parliament for Toowoomba South
- Incumbent
- Assumed office 16 July 2016
- Preceded by: John McVeigh

Personal details
- Born: David Carl Janetzki; 28 June 1978 (age 48) Toowoomba, Queensland, Australia
- Party: Liberal National Party
- Spouse: Melinda Janetzki
- Education: University of Queensland (BEc/LLB(Hons))
- Profession: Lawyer, Banker

David Carl Janetzki (born 28 June 1978) is an Australian politician and since November 2024, the current Treasurer of Queensland. He was elected to the Queensland Legislative Assembly, representing the seat of Toowoomba South for the Liberal National Party at a Toowoomba South state by-election in July 2016.

== Early life and education ==
Janetzki was born in Toowoomba and raised on the family dairy farm between Brymaroo and Jondaryn, located on the Darling Downs. His German ancestors settled in the Darling Downs in the late 1800s.

His father is a stalwart of the agriculture show movement and is currently the Darling Downs Sub-Chamber President.

Janetzki attended small country schools, including Acland State School and Jondaryan State School. He later graduated from Concordia Lutheran College as School Captain, Head Boarder Boy and First XI Cricket Captain.

Janetzki studied economics and law degrees (honours) from the University of Queensland. He also holds an A.Mus.A (Piano).

== Legal career ==
Janetzki worked at law firms ClarkeKann, Corrs Chambers Westgarth and in London with ManpowerGroup. He specialised in commercial law and litigation. Upon returning home to Toowoomba in 2007, he served as General Counsel and Company Secretary of Heritage Bank.

He was a finalist in the 2010 Australian Young Inhouse Lawyer of the Year and was recognised in 2015 as one of Australia's leading inhouse banking and finance lawyers by Doyle's Guide.

In 2014, Janetzki was appointed to the Board of Opera Queensland.

== Political career ==
Janetzki was first elected to the Parliament of Queensland at the 2016 Toowoomba South state by-election following the resignation of John McVeigh who went on to contest the Division of Groom at the 2016 Australian federal election.

He was appointed Deputy Leader of the Opposition, Shadow Treasurer and Shadow Minister for Investment and Trade in November 2020 under then Opposition leader David Crisafulli He previously held the positions of Shadow Attorney-General and Shadow Minister for Justice from December 2017 to October 2020. In February 2022, he announced he would step down as Deputy Leader of the Opposition, effective in March 2022, but retain his other shadow portfolios due to "family challenges" in the past few years.

Janetzki became Treasurer of Queensland following the Liberal National Party's victory at the 2024 Queensland state election.

== Personal life ==
Janetzki is married and has three children. His wife Melinda (van der Meulen) is a coloratura operatic soprano who has performed at the Sydney Opera House and for European opera companies.

Parliament of Queensland
Preceded by John McVeigh	Member for Toowoomba South; 2016–present	Incumbent
Political offices
Preceded by Cameron Dick	Treasurer of Queensland; 2024–present	Incumbent
