= Darren Grimwade =

Australian politician

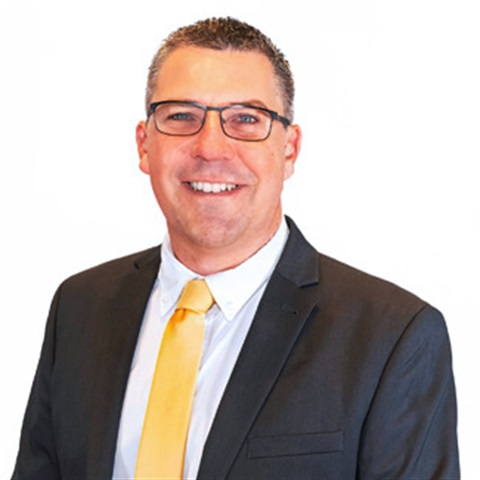

Councillor of the City of Moreton Bay for Division 11
- In office 19 March 2016 – 10 July 2025
- Preceded by: Bob Millar
- Succeeded by: Ellie Smith

Member of the Queensland Legislative Assembly for Morayfield
- In office 24 March 2012 – 31 January 2015
- Preceded by: Mark Ryan
- Succeeded by: Mark Ryan

Personal details
- Born: 3 April 1980 (age 46)
- Party: Independent (since 2015); Liberal National (until 2015)

Darren John Grimwade (born 3 April 1980) is an Australian politician. He was a member of the Legislative Assembly of Queensland from 2012 to 2015, representing the electorate of Morayfield.

Grimwade was born in Redcliffe. He worked as a baker and as a director of a taxation franchise before buying a pizza café in Burpengary in 2007, which he was operating at the time of his election to parliament. He was awarded Queensland Young Entrepreneur of the Year in 2008.

Grimwade was elected to the Legislative Assembly at the 2012 state election, defeating Labor MP Mark Ryan.

In the 2015 state election, Grimwade was unsuccessful in his re-election bid for the seat of Morayfield, and was succeeded by the former member for Morayfield, Mark Ryan, who Grimwade defeated in 2012.

In 2016, Grimwade was elected as a local Councillor to the Moreton Bay Regional Council, representing Division 11.

At the 2020 local government elections, Grimwade was returned to council, again representing Division 11 with a 76.52% primary vote. He was again elected in 2024, this time unopposed.

On 10 July 2025, it was announced that he had tendered his resignation as Councillor for Division 11 in the City of Moreton Bay, triggering a by-election, citing his wife's career progression and relocation to outback Queensland.

Parliament of Queensland
Preceded by Mark Ryan	Member for Morayfield; 2012–2015	Succeeded by Mark Ryan
