= Mark Ryan (Australian politician) =

Australian politician

The Honourable Mark Ryan MP
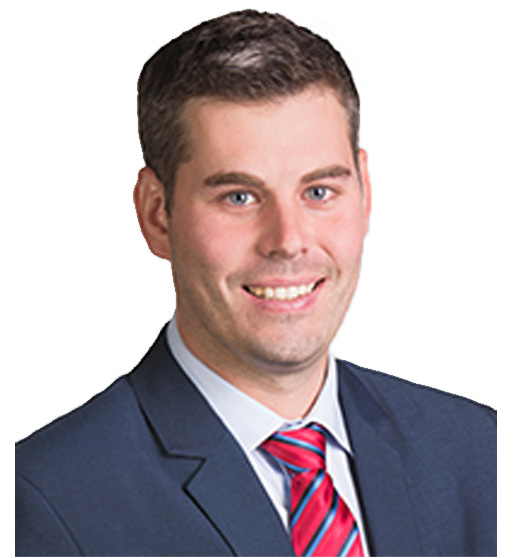

Minister for Police and Community Safety
- In office 18 December 2023 – 27 October 2024
- Premier: Annastacia Palaszczuk; Steven Miles
- Preceded by: Himself (as Minister for Police and Corrective Services)
- Succeeded by: Dan Purdie

Minister for Fire and Emergency Services
- In office 12 November 2020 – 18 December 2023
- Premier: Annastacia Palaszczuk; Steven Miles
- Preceded by: Craig Crawford
- Succeeded by: Nikki Boyd (as Minister for Fire and Disaster Recovery)

Minister for Police and Corrective Services
- In office 11 November 2016 – 18 December 2023
- Premier: Annastacia Palaszczuk; Steven Miles
- Preceded by: Bill Byrne
- Succeeded by: Himself (as Minister for Police); Nikki Boyd (as Minister for Corrective Services)

Assistant Minister of State Assisting the Premier of Queensland
- In office 7 December 2015 – 11 November 2016
- Premier: Annastacia Palaszczuk
- Preceded by: Stirling Hinchliffe
- Succeeded by: Jennifer Howard

Member of the Queensland Legislative Assembly for Morayfield
- Incumbent
- Assumed office 31 January 2015
- Preceded by: Darren Grimwade
- In office 21 March 2009 – 24 March 2012
- Preceded by: New seat
- Succeeded by: Darren Grimwade

Personal details
- Born: 29 December 1982 (age 43) Nambour, Queensland, Australia
- Party: Labor Party
- Spouse: Holly Shine Ryan
- Children: 3
- Education: University of Queensland
- Website: www.markryan.com.au

Mark Thomas Ryan (born 29 December 1982) is an Australian Labor Party politician who has represented Morayfield in the Queensland Parliament since the 2015 election, having previously represented the seat from 2009 to 2012

Ryan was born in Nambour, Queensland, and attended St Eugene School and then St Joseph's College, Nudgee. He received a Bachelor of Laws with First Class Honours and a Bachelor of Arts from the University of Queensland and became a solicitor. In 2009, he was selected as the Labor candidate for the new seat of Morayfield and was elected. He lost the seat at the 2012 Queensland state election, but regained it at the 2015 election and has held it ever since.

In December 2015 a cabinet reshuffle elevated Ryan to the position of Assistant Minister for State Assisting the Premier in an extended cabinet.

In November 2016, a cabinet reshuffle saw Ryan promoted to senior cabinet as the Minister for Police, Fire and Emergency Services and the Minister for Correctional Services.

Parliament of Queensland
New seat	Member for Morayfield; 2009–2012	Succeeded by Darren Grimwade
Preceded by Darren Grimwade	Member for Morayfield; 2015–present	Incumbent
