= John McVeigh (politician) =

Australian former politician (born 1965)

The Honourable John McVeigh
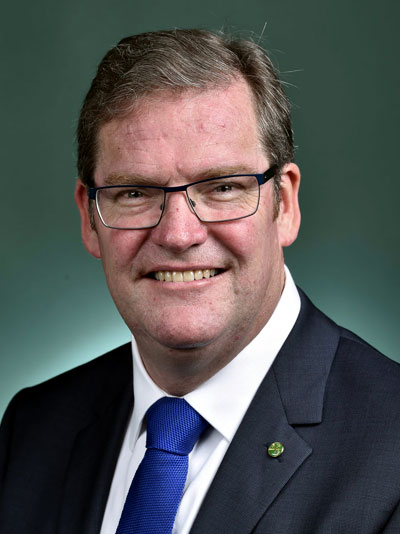
- Official portrait, 2017

Minister for Regional Development, Territories and Local Government
- In office 20 December 2017 – 28 August 2018
- Prime Minister: Malcolm Turnbull; Scott Morrison
- Preceded by: Paul Fletcher
- Succeeded by: Bridget McKenzie

Member of the Australian Parliament for Groom
- In office 2 July 2016 – 18 September 2020
- Preceded by: Ian Macfarlane
- Succeeded by: Garth Hamilton

Minister for Agriculture, Fisheries and Forestry of Queensland
- In office 3 April 2012 – 14 February 2015
- Premier: Campbell Newman
- Preceded by: Tim Mulherin (Primary Industries, Food and Rural Economies); Craig Wallace (Fisheries)
- Succeeded by: Bill Byrne

Member of the Queensland Parliament for Toowoomba South
- In office 24 March 2012 – 29 April 2016
- Preceded by: Mike Horan
- Succeeded by: David Janetzki

Personal details
- Born: 13 May 1965 (age 61) Allora, Queensland, Australia
- Party: Liberal
- Other political affiliations: LNP (state); Young Nationals (1980s)
- Relations: Tom McVeigh (father)
- Education: University of Southern Queensland; Bond University; University of Queensland
- Occupation: Salesman; management consultant

John Joseph McVeigh (born 13 May 1965) is an Australian former politician. He was a member of the House of Representatives from 2016 to 2020, representing the Queensland seat of Groom for the Liberal Party. During the Turnbull government he served in cabinet as Minister for Regional Development, Territories and Local Government from 2017 to 2018. He was previously a member of the Legislative Assembly of Queensland from 2012 to 2016 and was Minister for Agriculture, Fisheries and Forestry under Premier Campbell Newman.

== Early life ==
McVeigh was born on 13 May 1965 in Allora, Queensland. His father Tom McVeigh was a federal Nationals MP from 1972 to 1988 for Groom and its predecessor, Darling Downs, and served as a minister in the Fraser government.

McVeigh grew up on a grain farm on the Darling Downs, and was educated at Jondaryan State School, St Joseph's College, and Downlands College. He holds the degrees of Bachelor of Business from the University of Southern Queensland, Master of Business Administration from Bond University and Doctor of Philosophy from the University of Queensland. He began his PhD in 2005 through the Cooperative Research Centre for Irrigation Futures and was awarded the degree in 2012, by which time he had become state agricultural minister. His thesis was titled "Influencing sustainable water use in Australian irrigated agriculture: a value chain management approach".

== Career ==
Prior to entering politics McVeigh worked in agribusiness. He entered the Bank of Queensland's graduate program as an executive trainee in 1986. He later worked as a sales representative for Elders Pastoral (1986–1988), marketing coordinator for Cargill Seeds Australia (1988–1990), and market development officer for the state Department of Primary Industries (1990–1992). He then co-founded a management consulting firm, Ellis Foster McVeigh, and served as managing director from 1992 to 2008.

McVeigh was president of the Toowoomba branch of the Young Nationals from 1987 to 1988. He served on the Toowoomba Regional Council from 2008 to 2012.

== State politics ==
McVeigh served as a member of the Legislative Assembly of Queensland for Toowoomba South between 2012 and 2016; and served as the Queensland Government Minister for Agriculture, Fisheries and Forestry from 3 April 2012 until 14 February 2015. After the LNP lost the 2015 state election he served as Shadow Minister for Science, Information Technology and Innovation. On 9 April 2016, the LNP announced that McVeigh had been preselected to contest Groom at the 2016 federal election. His resignation from the Queensland Parliament on 29 April 2016 triggered a by-election in the district of Toowoomba South.

== Federal politics ==
In April 2016, McVeigh won LNP preselection for the Division of Groom, which his father had held 30 years earlier. He was endorsed by the retiring member, Ian Macfarlane. He retained the seat for the LNP at the 2016 federal election. While his father had been a member of the Nationals, the younger McVeigh sat as a Liberal.

Following a ministerial reshuffle in December 2017, McVeigh was promoted to cabinet as Minister for Regional Development, Territories and Local Government. He said that Prime Minister Malcolm Turnbull was looking to increase the representation of regional Queensland. He and David Littleproud were the first MPs elected in 2016 to be promoted to cabinet. McVeigh did not retain his position when Scott Morrison succeeded Turnbull as prime minister in August 2018. In the two leadership spills, he supported Turnbull against Dutton in the first vote and Dutton against Morrison in the second.

On 18 September 2020, McVeigh announced his immediate resignation from parliament. He said that he needed to concentrate on caring for his wife Anita, who was suffering from a major illness.

== Later activities ==
After leaving parliament, McVeigh was appointed director of the University of Southern Queensland's SQNNSW Innovation Hub and chair of the Regional Economies Centre of Excellence. He also took up board roles with the Toowoomba Catholic Schools Council and the Royal Agricultural Society of Queensland.

In August 2024, it was announced that McVeigh would become chancellor of the University of Southern Queensland from 1 December 2024.

== Personal life ==
McVeigh has one son and five daughters with his wife Anita, whom he married in 1987.

== See also ==
- Political families of Australia

Parliament of Australia
Preceded by Ian Macfarlane	Member for Groom; 2016–2020	Succeeded by Garth Hamilton
Political offices
Preceded by Paul Fletcher as Minister for Territories, Local Government and Major Projects	Minister for Regional Development, Territories and Local Government; 2017–2018	Succeeded by Bridget McKenzie
Parliament of Queensland
Preceded by Mike Horan	Member for Toowoomba South; 2012–2016	Succeeded by David Janetzki
Political offices
Preceded by Tim Mulherin as Minister for Primary Industries, Food and Rural Economies	Queensland Government; Minister for Agriculture, Fisheries and Forestries; 2012–2015	Succeeded by Bill Byrne
Preceded by Craig Wallace as Minister for Fisheries	Queensland Government; Minister for Agriculture, Fisheries and Forestries; 2012–2015	Succeeded by Bill Byrne
