= Electoral district of Sunnybank =

Sunnybank Queensland—Legislative Assembly
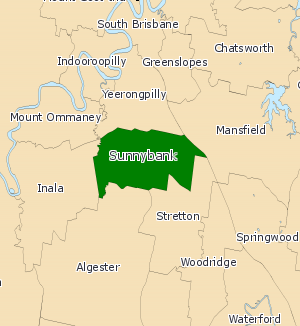
- Sunnybank (2008–2017)
- State: Queensland
- Dates current: 1992–2001; 2009–2017
- Namesake: Sunnybank
- Electors: 30,239 (2015)
- Area: 41 km^{2} (15.8 sq mi)
- Coordinates: 27°35′S 153°2′E

Sunnybank was an electoral district of the Legislative Assembly in the Australian state of Queensland from 1992 to 2001, and again from 2009 to 2017.

The district was based in the area of southern suburbs of Brisbane previously named as the suburb of Sunnybank before Sunnybank was broken up into smaller suburbs. It was first created for the 1992 state election only to be abolished ahead of the 2001 state election, essentially replaced by the new district of Stretton.

Sunnybank was revived as an electorate for the 2009 state election to replace the abolished district of Mount Gravatt. It was abolished ahead of the 2017 election and replaced by the seat of Toohey.

== Members for Sunnybank ==
First incarnation (1992–2001)
Member	Party	Term
Stephen Robertson	Labor	1992–2001
Second incarnation (2009–present)
Member	Party	Term
Judy Spence	Labor	2009–2012
Mark Stewart	Liberal National	2012–2015
Peter Russo	Labor	2015–2017
