= Peter Russo (politician) =

Australian lawyer and politician in Queensland

Peter Russo MP
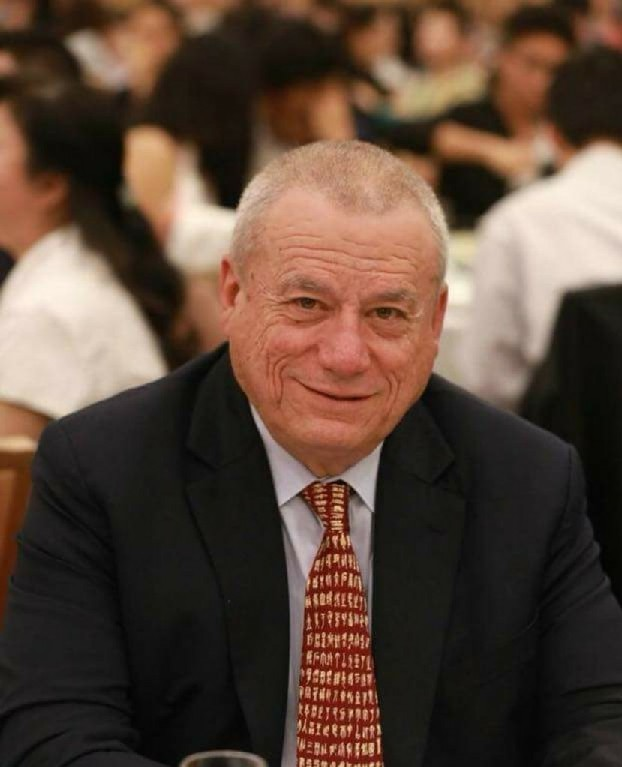

Member of the Queensland Legislative Assembly for Toohey
- Incumbent
- Assumed office 25 November 2017
- Preceded by: New seat

Member of the Queensland Legislative Assembly for Sunnybank
- In office 31 January 2015 – 25 November 2017
- Preceded by: Mark Stewart
- Succeeded by: Seat abolished

Personal details
- Born: 13 September 1955 (age 71) Townsville, Queensland
- Party: Labor
- Profession: Lawyer
- Website: www.peterrusso.au

Peter Samuel Russo (born 13 September 1955) is an Australian politician. He is the Labor Party member for Toohey (formerly Sunnybank) in the Queensland Legislative Assembly since 2015.

Russo is currently the Chair of the Community Safety and Legal Affairs Committee. He has previously served as the Acting Chair of the Parliamentary Crime and Corruption Committee and Chair of the Finance and Administration Committee and Chair of the Legal Affairs and Community Safety Committee, and Chair of the Legal Affairs and Safety Committee.

Prior to being elected, Russo was the Principal of Russo Lawyers and is admitted as a solicitor of the Supreme Courts of Queensland, New South Wales, and Western Australia and the High Court of Australia. He holds a Master of Laws from the Queensland University of Technology. He has been admitted for over 30 years, with a particular focus in the area of criminal law. He is a past member of the Queensland Law Society Criminal Law Committee.

He was named The Australian newspaper's "Australian of the Year" in 2007. He has been involved in many high-profile cases, including representing Dr Mohamed Haneef in 2007 and 2008.

Parliament of Queensland
Preceded by Mark Stewart	Member for Sunnybank; 2015–2017	Abolished
New seat	Member for Toohey; 2017–present	Incumbent
