= Electoral district of Toowoomba South =

State electoral district of Queensland, Australia

Toowoomba South Queensland—Legislative Assembly
- Electoral map of Toowoomba South 2017
- State: Queensland
- MP: David Janetzki
- Party: Liberal National
- Namesake: Toowoomba
- Electors: 37,750 (2020)
- Area: 44 km^{2} (17.0 sq mi)
- Demographic: Provincial
- Coordinates: 27°35′S 151°57′E
Electorates around Toowoomba South:
| Condamine | Toowoomba North | Lockyer |
| Condamine | Toowoomba South | Lockyer |
| Condamine | Condamine | Lockyer |

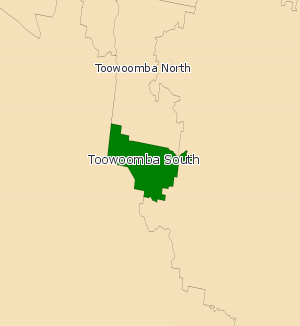
Toowoomba South electoral map from 2008

Toowoomba South is an electoral district of the Legislative Assembly in the Australian state of Queensland. It was created with the 1972 redistribution, and replaced the abolished Toowoomba East.

The electorate covers the eastern and inner southern suburbs of Toowoomba, including the University of Southern Queensland. It excludes the outer southwestern suburb of Drayton, and other areas nearby the University of Southern Queensland, which fall in the Electoral district of Condamine.

It is part of the Darling Downs group of seats, and is bounded on the east by Lockyer, the north by Toowoomba North, and on the south and west by Condamine.

The electorate was held by John McVeigh for the Liberal National Party, until his resignation on 29 April 2016 to contest the federal seat of Groom at the 2016 federal election. David Janetzki was elected at the subsequent by-election on 16 July 2016.

== Members for Toowoomba South ==
| Member | Party | Term |
|---|---|---|
| Peter Wood | Labor | 1972–1974 |
| John Warner | Country | 1974–1974 |
| John Warner | National | 1974–1986 |
| Clive Berghofer | National | 1986–1991 |
| Mike Horan | National | 1991–2008 |
| Mike Horan | Liberal National | 2008–2012 |
| John McVeigh | Liberal National | 2012–2016 |
| David Janetzki | Liberal National | 2016–present |

== Election results ==
2024 Queensland state election: Toowoomba South
| Party | Candidate | Votes | % | ±% |
|---|---|---|---|---|
| Liberal National | David Janetzki | 18,566 | 53.84 | +2.54 |
| Labor | Susan Krause | 8,758 | 25.40 | −5.50 |
| Greens | Wren Beith | 2,353 | 6.82 | +0.02 |
| One Nation | Eaton Haines | 1,847 | 5.36 | −2.26 |
| Family First | Alexandra Todd | 1,590 | 4.61 | +4.61 |
| Legalise Cannabis | Ingrid Weber | 1,371 | 3.97 | +3.97 |
| Total formal votes | | 34,485 | 96.6 | |
| Informal votes | | 1,224 | 3.4 | |
| Turnout | | 35,709 | 89.30 | |
Two-party-preferred result
| Liberal National | David Janetzki | 21,723 | 62.99 | +2.79 |
| Labor | Susan Krause | 12,762 | 37.01 | −2.79 |
| Liberal National hold | | Swing | +2.79 | |

Primary vote results in Toowoomba South (Parties that have never gotten 5% of the vote are omitted)
Liberal National

Country/National
Liberal

Labor
One Nation
Katter's Australian
Greens
Family First
Australian Democrats
Queensland Labor
Independent
View source data.
Two-candidate-preferred vote results in Toowoomba South View source data.
