= Electoral results for the Division of Bowman =

Australian division election results

This is a list of electoral results for the Division of Bowman in Australian federal elections from the division's creation in 1949 until the present.

== Members ==
| Member | Party | Term |
|---|---|---|
| Malcolm McColm | Liberal | 1949–1961 |
| Jack Comber | Labor | 1961–1963 |
| Wylie Gibbs | Liberal | 1963–1969 |
| Len Keogh | Labor | 1969–1975 |
| David Jull | Liberal | 1975–1983 |
| Len Keogh | Labor | 1983–1987 |
| Con Sciacca | Labor | 1987–1996 |
| Andrea West | Liberal | 1996–1998 |
| Con Sciacca | Labor | 1998–2004 |
| Andrew Laming | Liberal | 2004–2010 |
| Andrew Laming | Liberal National | 2010–2022 |
| Henry Pike | Liberal National | 2022–present |

== Election results ==
=== Elections in the 2020s ===
==== 2025 ====
2025 Australian federal election: Bowman
| Party | Candidate | Votes | % | ±% |
|---|---|---|---|---|
| Labor | Darcy Brown | | | |
| Family First | David Todd | | | |
| Independent | Shaun Holloway | | | |
| One Nation | Matthew Knight | | | |
| Trumpet of Patriots | Gary Williamson | | | |
| Liberal National | Henry Pike | | | |
| Greens | Kristie Lockhart | | | |
| Total formal votes | | | | |
| Informal votes | | | | |
| Turnout | | | | |

==== 2022 ====
2022 Australian federal election: Bowman
| Party | Candidate | Votes | % | ±% |
|---|---|---|---|---|
| Liberal National | Henry Pike | 43,088 | 42.37 | −6.30 |
| Labor | Donisha Duff | 29,694 | 29.20 | +2.61 |
| Greens | Ian Mazlin | 13,241 | 13.02 | +1.03 |
| One Nation | Walter Todd | 7,825 | 7.69 | +0.39 |
| United Australia | Mary-Jane Stevens | 6,601 | 6.49 | +2.89 |
| TNL | Phil Johnson | 1,243 | 1.22 | +1.22 |
| Total formal votes | | 101,692 | 97.09 | +0.49 |
| Informal votes | | 3,045 | 2.91 | −0.49 |
| Turnout | | 104,737 | 90.51 | −2.53 |
Two-party-preferred result
| Liberal National | Henry Pike | 56,447 | 55.51 | −4.73 |
| Labor | Donisha Duff | 45,245 | 44.49 | +4.73 |
| Liberal National hold | | Swing | −4.73 | |

Alluvial diagram for preference flows in the seat of Bowman in the 2022 federal election. indicates at what stage the winning candidate had over 50% of the votes and was declared the winner.

=== Elections in the 2010s ===
==== 2019 ====
2019 Australian federal election: Bowman
| Party | Candidate | Votes | % | ±% |
|---|---|---|---|---|
| Liberal National | Andrew Laming | 47,866 | 48.67 | −1.10 |
| Labor | Tom Baster | 26,147 | 26.59 | −5.46 |
| Greens | Emerald Moon | 11,795 | 11.99 | +2.23 |
| One Nation | Glen Wadsworth | 7,175 | 7.30 | +7.30 |
| United Australia | Shane Clarke | 3,540 | 3.60 | +3.60 |
| Conservative National | David Anderson | 1,816 | 1.85 | +1.85 |
| Total formal votes | | 98,339 | 96.60 | +0.41 |
| Informal votes | | 3,465 | 3.40 | −0.41 |
| Turnout | | 101,804 | 93.04 | +0.38 |
Two-party-preferred result
| Liberal National | Andrew Laming | 59,237 | 60.24 | +3.17 |
| Labor | Tom Baster | 39,102 | 39.76 | −3.17 |
| Liberal National hold | | Swing | +3.17 | |

==== 2016 ====
2016 Australian federal election: Bowman
| Party | Candidate | Votes | % | ±% |
|---|---|---|---|---|
| Liberal National | Andrew Laming | 45,946 | 49.77 | +0.49 |
| Labor | Kim Richards | 29,592 | 32.05 | +2.17 |
| Greens | Brad Scott | 9,012 | 9.76 | +3.78 |
| Family First | Brett Saunders | 4,459 | 4.83 | +2.68 |
| Liberty Alliance | Tony Duncan | 3,316 | 3.59 | +3.59 |
| Total formal votes | | 92,325 | 96.19 | +0.70 |
| Informal votes | | 3,654 | 3.81 | −0.70 |
| Turnout | | 95,979 | 92.78 | −2.14 |
Two-party-preferred result
| Liberal National | Andrew Laming | 52,690 | 57.07 | −1.79 |
| Labor | Kim Richards | 39,635 | 42.93 | +1.79 |
| Liberal National hold | | Swing | −1.79 | |

==== 2013 ====
2013 Australian federal election: Bowman
| Party | Candidate | Votes | % | ±% |
|---|---|---|---|---|
| Liberal National | Andrew Laming | 42,828 | 49.28 | −6.35 |
| Labor | Darryl Briskey | 25,967 | 29.88 | −0.29 |
| Palmer United | John Wayne | 11,049 | 12.71 | +12.71 |
| Greens | Penny Allman-Payne | 5,198 | 5.98 | −3.99 |
| Family First | Andrew O'Shea | 1,868 | 2.15 | −0.09 |
| Total formal votes | | 86,910 | 95.49 | +0.88 |
| Informal votes | | 4,102 | 4.51 | −0.88 |
| Turnout | | 91,012 | 94.93 | +0.63 |
Two-party-preferred result
| Liberal National | Andrew Laming | 51,155 | 58.86 | −1.53 |
| Labor | Darryl Briskey | 35,755 | 41.14 | +1.53 |
| Liberal National hold | | Swing | −1.53 | |

==== 2010 ====
2010 Australian federal election: Bowman
| Party | Candidate | Votes | % | ±% |
|---|---|---|---|---|
| Liberal National | Andrew Laming | 45,585 | 55.63 | +9.51 |
| Labor | Jenny Peters | 24,719 | 30.17 | −13.97 |
| Greens | David Keogh | 8,174 | 9.97 | +4.51 |
| Family First | Karina Windolf | 1,834 | 2.24 | −0.70 |
| One Nation | Dave Chidgey | 865 | 1.06 | +0.53 |
| Democratic Labor | John Kent | 768 | 0.94 | +0.94 |
| Total formal votes | | 81,945 | 94.61 | −2.01 |
| Informal votes | | 4,672 | 5.39 | +2.01 |
| Turnout | | 86,617 | 94.26 | −0.98 |
Two-party-preferred result
| Liberal National | Andrew Laming | 49,490 | 60.39 | +10.39 |
| Labor | Jenny Peters | 32,455 | 39.61 | −10.39 |
| Liberal National hold | | Swing | +10.39 | |

=== Elections in the 2000s ===
==== 2007 ====
2007 Australian federal election: Bowman
| Party | Candidate | Votes | % | ±% |
|---|---|---|---|---|
| Liberal | Andrew Laming | 37,886 | 46.16 | −4.27 |
| Labor | Jason Young | 36,207 | 44.11 | +8.37 |
| Greens | Brad Scott | 4,475 | 5.45 | +0.67 |
| Family First | Alan Lucas | 2,405 | 2.93 | −1.03 |
| Democrats | Paul Holland | 676 | 0.82 | −0.25 |
| One Nation | Dave Chidgey | 433 | 0.53 | +0.53 |
| Total formal votes | | 82,082 | 96.62 | +1.56 |
| Informal votes | | 2,873 | 3.38 | −1.56 |
| Turnout | | 84,955 | 95.48 | +0.89 |
Two-party-preferred result
| Liberal | Andrew Laming | 41,073 | 50.04 | −8.86 |
| Labor | Jason Young | 41,009 | 49.96 | +8.86 |
| Liberal hold | | Swing | −8.86 | |

==== 2004 ====
2004 Australian federal election: Bowman
| Party | Candidate | Votes | % | ±% |
|---|---|---|---|---|
| Liberal | Andrew Laming | 39,363 | 50.59 | +7.53 |
| Labor | Donna Webster | 27,631 | 35.51 | −8.93 |
| Greens | Paula Nadas | 3,729 | 4.79 | +2.18 |
| Family First | Mal Cayley | 3,126 | 4.02 | +4.02 |
| National | Joe Ross | 3,125 | 4.02 | +4.02 |
| Democrats | Robert H Bromwich | 835 | 1.07 | −3.62 |
| Total formal votes | | 77,809 | 95.04 | +0.18 |
| Informal votes | | 4,063 | 4.96 | −0.18 |
| Turnout | | 81,872 | 94.51 | −0.04 |
Two-party-preferred result
| Liberal | Andrew Laming | 46,004 | 59.12 | +6.0 |
| Labor | Donna Webster | 31,805 | 40.88 | −6.0 |
| Liberal notional hold | | Swing | +6.0 | |

The sitting member was Con Sciacca (Labor) however the redistribution had resulted in a notional Liberal majority of 3.1% and Sciacca contested the new seat of Bonner.

==== 2001 ====
2001 Australian federal election: Bowman
| Party | Candidate | Votes | % | ±% |
|---|---|---|---|---|
| Labor | Con Sciacca | 35,213 | 44.44 | +0.61 |
| Liberal | Andrew Laming | 34,121 | 43.06 | +5.52 |
| Democrats | Chad Smith | 3,873 | 4.89 | −0.52 |
| One Nation | Barry Myatt | 3,862 | 4.87 | −6.19 |
| Greens | Fay Smith | 2,164 | 2.73 | +0.57 |
| Total formal votes | | 79,233 | 95.25 | −2.12 |
| Informal votes | | 3,954 | 4.75 | +2.12 |
| Turnout | | 83,187 | 96.03 | |
Two-party-preferred result
| Labor | Con Sciacca | 40,742 | 51.42 | −1.87 |
| Liberal | Andrew Laming | 38,491 | 48.58 | +1.87 |
| Labor hold | | Swing | −1.87 | |

=== Elections in the 1990s ===
==== 1998 ====
1998 Australian federal election: Bowman
| Party | Candidate | Votes | % | ±% |
|---|---|---|---|---|
| Labor | Con Sciacca | 32,606 | 43.83 | +1.70 |
| Liberal | Andrea West | 27,927 | 37.54 | −8.98 |
| One Nation | Barry Myatt | 8,227 | 11.06 | +11.06 |
| Democrats | Jenny van Rooyen | 4,021 | 5.41 | −2.97 |
| Greens | Deeane Moorhead | 1,606 | 2.16 | −0.34 |
| Total formal votes | | 74,387 | 97.36 | −0.45 |
| Informal votes | | 2,015 | 2.64 | +0.45 |
| Turnout | | 76,402 | 95.02 | −0.49 |
Two-party-preferred result
| Labor | Con Sciacca | 39,642 | 53.29 | +4.18 |
| Liberal | Andrea West | 34,746 | 46.71 | −4.18 |
| Labor gain from Liberal | | Swing | +4.18 | |

==== 1996 ====
1996 Australian federal election: Bowman
| Party | Candidate | Votes | % | ±% |
|---|---|---|---|---|
| Liberal | Andrea West | 33,088 | 46.53 | +12.17 |
| Labor | Con Sciacca | 29,964 | 42.13 | −9.35 |
| Democrats | Jenny van Rooyen | 5,954 | 8.37 | +4.50 |
| Greens | Tony Krajniw | 1,780 | 2.50 | −1.34 |
| Indigenous Peoples | Selina Reilly | 331 | 0.47 | +0.47 |
| Total formal votes | | 71,117 | 97.82 | +0.37 |
| Informal votes | | 1,587 | 2.18 | −0.37 |
| Turnout | | 72,704 | 95.52 | −0.74 |
Two-party-preferred result
| Liberal | Andrea West | 36,104 | 50.89 | +9.03 |
| Labor | Con Sciacca | 34,836 | 49.11 | −9.03 |
| Liberal gain from Labor | | Swing | +9.03 | |

==== 1993 ====
1993 Australian federal election: Bowman
| Party | Candidate | Votes | % | ±% |
|---|---|---|---|---|
| Labor | Con Sciacca | 35,927 | 50.84 | +4.18 |
| Liberal | Debra Wardle | 24,700 | 34.95 | +4.28 |
| National | Nigel Marsh | 3,009 | 4.26 | −1.98 |
| Democrats | Murray Henman | 2,714 | 3.84 | −12.60 |
| Greens | Frank Bickle | 2,674 | 3.78 | +3.78 |
| Independent | Richard May | 574 | 0.81 | +0.81 |
| Confederate Action | Kevin Hendstock | 551 | 0.78 | +0.78 |
| Independent | Mark McLaren | 301 | 0.43 | +0.43 |
| | Bill Wheeler | 214 | 0.30 | +0.30 |
| Total formal votes | | 70,664 | 97.41 | −0.32 |
| Informal votes | | 1,878 | 2.59 | +0.32 |
| Turnout | | 72,542 | 96.26 | |
Two-party-preferred result
| Labor | Con Sciacca | 40,554 | 57.42 | −0.61 |
| Liberal | Debra Wardle | 30,067 | 42.58 | +0.61 |
| Labor hold | | Swing | −0.61 | |

==== 1990 ====
1990 Australian federal election: Bowman
| Party | Candidate | Votes | % | ±% |
|---|---|---|---|---|
| Labor | Con Sciacca | 34,925 | 46.3 | −2.0 |
| Liberal | Peter Trounce | 23,571 | 31.3 | +8.3 |
| Democrats | Phillip Grattan | 12,207 | 16.2 | +7.2 |
| National | Stan Brimson | 4,697 | 6.2 | −11.9 |
| Total formal votes | | 75,400 | 97.7 | |
| Informal votes | | 1,773 | 2.3 | |
| Turnout | | 77,173 | 95.6 | |
Two-party-preferred result
| Labor | Con Sciacca | 43,275 | 57.5 | +2.5 |
| Liberal | Peter Trounce | 31,950 | 42.5 | −2.5 |
| Labor hold | | Swing | +2.5 | |

=== Elections in the 1980s ===
==== 1987 ====
1987 Australian federal election: Bowman
| Party | Candidate | Votes | % | ±% |
|---|---|---|---|---|
| Labor | Con Sciacca | 31,223 | 48.3 | −3.3 |
| Liberal | Andrew Crowe | 14,866 | 23.0 | +1.0 |
| National | Bill Barry-Cotter | 11,696 | 18.1 | −2.0 |
| Democrats | Diana Taylor | 5,800 | 9.0 | +2.5 |
| Independent | Barry Cullen | 1,123 | 1.7 | +1.7 |
| Total formal votes | | 64,708 | 96.3 | |
| Informal votes | | 2,482 | 3.7 | |
| Turnout | | 67,190 | 93.6 | |
Two-party-preferred result
| Labor | Con Sciacca | 35,609 | 55.0 | −0.3 |
| Liberal | Andrew Crowe | 29,085 | 45.0 | +0.3 |
| Labor hold | | Swing | −0.3 | |

==== 1984 ====
1984 Australian federal election: Bowman
| Party | Candidate | Votes | % | ±% |
|---|---|---|---|---|
| Labor | Len Keogh | 29,312 | 51.6 | −1.6 |
| Liberal | Leo White | 12,378 | 21.8 | −15.0 |
| National | Noel Willersdorf | 11,443 | 20.1 | +14.1 |
| Democrats | Ronald Heindorff | 3,691 | 6.5 | +2.5 |
| Total formal votes | | 56,824 | 95.3 | |
| Informal votes | | 2,826 | 4.7 | |
| Turnout | | 59,650 | 93.8 | |
Two-party-preferred result
| Labor | Len Keogh | 31,444 | 55.3 | −0.4 |
| Liberal | Leo White | 25,380 | 44.7 | +0.4 |
| Labor hold | | Swing | −0.4 | |

==== 1983 ====
1983 Australian federal election: Bowman
| Party | Candidate | Votes | % | ±% |
|---|---|---|---|---|
| Labor | Len Keogh | 37,666 | 49.7 | +3.8 |
| Liberal | David Jull | 30,522 | 40.3 | −8.5 |
| National | Craig Brown | 4,579 | 6.0 | +6.0 |
| Democrats | Ronald Heindorff | 3,040 | 4.0 | −1.3 |
| Total formal votes | | 75,807 | 98.8 | |
| Informal votes | | 945 | 1.2 | |
| Turnout | | 76,752 | 93.3 | |
Two-party-preferred result
| Labor | Len Keogh | | 52.2 | +3.4 |
| Liberal | David Jull | | 47.8 | −3.4 |
| Labor gain from Liberal | | Swing | +3.4 | |

==== 1980 ====
1980 Australian federal election: Bowman
| Party | Candidate | Votes | % | ±% |
|---|---|---|---|---|
| Liberal | David Jull | 33,695 | 48.8 | −1.2 |
| Labor | Len Keogh | 31,722 | 45.9 | +6.2 |
| Democrats | Thomas Martin | 3,648 | 5.3 | −3.3 |
| Total formal votes | | 69,065 | 98.6 | |
| Informal votes | | 978 | 1.4 | |
| Turnout | | 70,043 | 94.5 | |
Two-party-preferred result
| Liberal | David Jull | 35,351 | 51.2 | −5.1 |
| Labor | Len Keogh | 33,714 | 48.8 | +5.1 |
| Liberal hold | | Swing | −5.1 | |

=== Elections in the 1970s ===
==== 1977 ====
1977 Australian federal election: Bowman
| Party | Candidate | Votes | % | ±% |
|---|---|---|---|---|
| Liberal | David Jull | 31,544 | 50.0 | +3.0 |
| Labor | Len Keogh | 25,078 | 39.7 | −2.3 |
| Democrats | Bryan Grehan | 5,452 | 8.6 | +8.6 |
| Progress | Martin Gant | 1,018 | 1.6 | +1.6 |
| Total formal votes | | 63,092 | 98.6 | |
| Informal votes | | 875 | 1.4 | |
| Turnout | | 63,967 | 95.3 | |
Two-party-preferred result
| Liberal | David Jull | | 56.3 | −1.0 |
| Labor | Len Keogh | | 43.7 | +1.0 |
| Liberal hold | | Swing | −1.0 | |

==== 1975 ====
1975 Australian federal election: Bowman
| Party | Candidate | Votes | % | ±% |
|---|---|---|---|---|
| Liberal | David Jull | 36,458 | 46.8 | +5.8 |
| Labor | Len Keogh | 32,825 | 42.2 | −7.6 |
| National Country | James Dean | 7,535 | 9.7 | +1.6 |
| Workers | Donald Wright | 1,046 | 1.3 | +1.3 |
| Total formal votes | | 77,864 | 98.7 | |
| Informal votes | | 1,009 | 1.3 | |
| Turnout | | 78,873 | 95.9 | |
Two-party-preferred result
| Liberal | David Jull | 44,438 | 57.1 | +8.4 |
| Labor | Len Keogh | 33,426 | 42.9 | −8.4 |
| Liberal gain from Labor | | Swing | +8.4 | |

==== 1974 ====
1974 Australian federal election: Bowman
| Party | Candidate | Votes | % | ±% |
|---|---|---|---|---|
| Labor | Len Keogh | 36,947 | 49.8 | −5.4 |
| Liberal | David Jull | 30,382 | 41.0 | +1.7 |
| Country | Gerry Langevad | 5,998 | 8.1 | +8.1 |
| Australia | Winifred Sharkey | 797 | 1.1 | +1.1 |
| Total formal votes | | 74,124 | 98.6 | |
| Informal votes | | 1,086 | 1.4 | |
| Turnout | | 75,210 | 95.1 | |
Two-party-preferred result
| Labor | Len Keogh | | 51.3 | −5.0 |
| Liberal | David Jull | | 48.7 | +5.0 |
| Labor hold | | Swing | −5.0 | |

==== 1972 ====
1972 Australian federal election: Bowman
| Party | Candidate | Votes | % | ±% |
|---|---|---|---|---|
| Labor | Len Keogh | 35,113 | 55.2 | +4.1 |
| Liberal | Kerry Chiconi | 24,964 | 39.3 | −2.8 |
| Democratic Labor | Denis Cochran | 3,508 | 5.5 | +0.6 |
| Total formal votes | | 63,585 | 98.4 | |
| Informal votes | | 1,040 | 1.6 | |
| Turnout | | 64,625 | 95.1 | |
Two-party-preferred result
| Labor | Len Keogh | | 56.3 | +3.8 |
| Liberal | Kerry Chiconi | | 43.7 | −3.8 |
| Labor hold | | Swing | +3.8 | |

=== Elections in the 1960s ===
==== 1969 ====
1969 Australian federal election: Bowman
| Party | Candidate | Votes | % | ±% |
|---|---|---|---|---|
| Labor | Len Keogh | 28,143 | 51.1 | +7.1 |
| Liberal | Wylie Gibbs | 23,167 | 42.1 | −7.1 |
| Democratic Labor | Noel Tennison | 2,713 | 4.9 | −1.9 |
| Independent | Harold Asmith | 1,002 | 1.8 | +1.8 |
| Total formal votes | | 55,025 | 98.6 | |
| Informal votes | | 784 | 1.4 | |
| Turnout | | 55,809 | 95.4 | |
Two-party-preferred result
| Labor | Len Keogh | | 52.5 | +7.1 |
| Liberal | Wylie Gibbs | | 47.5 | −7.1 |
| Labor gain from Liberal | | Swing | +7.1 | |

==== 1966 ====
1966 Australian federal election: Bowman
| Party | Candidate | Votes | % | ±% |
|---|---|---|---|---|
| Liberal | Wylie Gibbs | 25,921 | 51.3 | +5.5 |
| Labor | Jack Comber | 21,152 | 41.9 | −5.8 |
| Democratic Labor | Paul Tucker | 3,458 | 6.8 | +0.3 |
| Total formal votes | | 50,531 | 98.5 | |
| Informal votes | | 767 | 1.5 | |
| Turnout | | 51,298 | 95.7 | |
Two-party-preferred result
| Liberal | Wylie Gibbs | | 56.7 | +5.3 |
| Labor | Jack Comber | | 43.3 | −5.3 |
| Liberal hold | | Swing | +5.3 | |

==== 1963 ====
1963 Australian federal election: Bowman
| Party | Candidate | Votes | % | ±% |
|---|---|---|---|---|
| Labor | Jack Comber | 22,533 | 47.7 | +0.6 |
| Liberal | Wylie Gibbs | 21,618 | 45.8 | +2.4 |
| Democratic Labor | Harry Wright | 3,052 | 6.5 | −3.0 |
| Total formal votes | | 47,203 | 98.0 | |
| Informal votes | | 979 | 2.0 | |
| Turnout | | 48,182 | 96.4 | |
Two-party-preferred result
| Liberal | Wylie Gibbs | 24,280 | 51.4 | +3.3 |
| Labor | Jack Comber | 22,923 | 48.6 | −3.3 |
| Liberal gain from Labor | | Swing | +3.3 | |

==== 1961 ====
1961 Australian federal election: Bowman
| Party | Candidate | Votes | % | ±% |
|---|---|---|---|---|
| Labor | Jack Comber | 21,393 | 47.1 | +8.5 |
| Liberal | Malcolm McColm | 19,706 | 43.4 | −5.5 |
| Queensland Labor | Terence Burns | 4,327 | 9.5 | −2.3 |
| Total formal votes | | 45,426 | 97.4 | |
| Informal votes | | 1,202 | 2.6 | |
| Turnout | | 46,628 | 95.5 | |
Two-party-preferred result
| Labor | Jack Comber | 23,594 | 51.9 | +8.0 |
| Liberal | Malcolm McColm | 21,832 | 48.1 | −8.0 |
| Labor gain from Liberal | | Swing | +8.0 | |

=== Elections in the 1950s ===
==== 1958 ====
1958 Australian federal election: Bowman
| Party | Candidate | Votes | % | ±% |
|---|---|---|---|---|
| Liberal | Malcolm McColm | 20,770 | 48.9 | −5.8 |
| Labor | Hector Chalmers | 16,398 | 38.6 | −6.7 |
| Queensland Labor | Terence Burns | 5,002 | 11.8 | +11.8 |
| Australian Nationalist | Noel Condie | 331 | 0.8 | +0.8 |
| Total formal votes | | 42,501 | 97.2 | |
| Informal votes | | 1,244 | 2.8 | |
| Turnout | | 43,745 | 95.5 | |
Two-party-preferred result
| Liberal | Malcolm McColm | 23,841 | 56.1 | −1.4 |
| Labor | Hector Chalmers | 18,660 | 43.9 | +1.4 |
| Liberal hold | | Swing | −1.4 | |

==== 1955 ====
1955 Australian federal election: Bowman
| Party | Candidate | Votes | % | ±% |
|---|---|---|---|---|
| Liberal | Malcolm McColm | 22,500 | 54.7 | +0.7 |
| Labor | Hector Chalmers | 18,646 | 45.3 | +1.1 |
| Total formal votes | | 41,146 | 97.8 | |
| Informal votes | | 935 | 2.2 | |
| Turnout | | 42,081 | 95.2 | |
| Liberal hold | | Swing | −0.1 | |

==== 1954 ====
1954 Australian federal election: Bowman
| Party | Candidate | Votes | % | ±% |
|---|---|---|---|---|
| Liberal | Malcolm McColm | 22,839 | 53.3 | −0.8 |
| Labor | Jack Houston | 18,980 | 44.3 | +2.3 |
| Communist | Mabel Hanson | 1,069 | 2.5 | −1.4 |
| Total formal votes | | 42,888 | 98.9 | |
| Informal votes | | 479 | 1.1 | |
| Turnout | | 43,367 | 96.6 | |
Two-party-preferred result
| Liberal | Malcolm McColm | | 53.4 | −2.2 |
| Labor | Jack Houston | | 46.6 | +2.2 |
| Liberal hold | | Swing | −2.2 | |

==== 1951 ====
1951 Australian federal election: Bowman
| Party | Candidate | Votes | % | ±% |
|---|---|---|---|---|
| Liberal | Malcolm McColm | 21,410 | 54.1 | +0.7 |
| Labor | Michael Lyons | 16,637 | 42.0 | −2.9 |
| Communist | Mabel Hanson | 1,552 | 3.9 | +2.2 |
| Total formal votes | | 39,599 | 97.8 | |
| Informal votes | | 907 | 2.2 | |
| Turnout | | 40,506 | 96.0 | |
Two-party-preferred result
| Liberal | Malcolm McColm | | 55.6 | +1.8 |
| Labor | Michael Lyons | | 44.4 | −1.8 |
| Liberal hold | | Swing | +1.8 | |

=== Elections in the 1940s ===
==== 1949 ====
1949 Australian federal election: Bowman
| Party | Candidate | Votes | % | ±% |
|---|---|---|---|---|
| Liberal | Malcolm McColm | 20,090 | 53.4 | +6.1 |
| Labor | Wilfred Coutts | 16,886 | 44.9 | −7.8 |
| Communist | Mabel Hanson | 656 | 1.7 | +1.7 |
| Total formal votes | | 37,632 | 97.7 | |
| Informal votes | | 877 | 2.3 | |
| Turnout | | 38,509 | 95.4 | |
Two-party-preferred result
| Liberal | Malcolm McColm | | 53.8 | +6.5 |
| Labor | Wilfred Coutts | | 46.2 | −6.5 |
| Liberal notional gain from Labor | | Swing | −1.4 | |
