= Electoral results for the district of Chatsworth =

State elections in Queensland, Australia

This is a list of electoral results for the electoral district of Chatsworth in Queensland state elections.

== Members for Chatsworth ==
Member	Party	Term
Thomas Hiley	Liberal	1960–1966
Bill Hewitt	Liberal	1966–1977
Terry Mackenroth	Labor	1977–2005
Michael Caltabiano	Liberal	2005–2006
Chris Bombolas	Labor	2006–2009
Steve Kilburn	Labor	2009–2012
Steve Minnikin	Liberal National	2012–present

== Election results ==
=== Elections in the 2020s ===
2024 Queensland state election: Chatsworth
Party	Candidate	Votes	%	±%
Liberal National	Steve Minnikin	17,309	52.54	+6.25
Labor	Lisa O'Donnell	10,331	31.36	−8.23
Greens	James Smart	3,479	10.56	+1.24
One Nation	Jasmine Harte	1,031	3.13	+0.07
Family First	Eliza Campbell	796	2.41	+2.41
Total formal votes		32,946	97.39	−0.14
Informal votes		884	2.61	+0.14
Turnout		33,830	91.85	+1.10
Two-party-preferred result
Liberal National	Steve Minnikin	19,264	58.47	+7.18
Labor	Lisa O'Donnell	13,682	41.53	−7.18
Liberal National hold		Swing	+7.18	

2020 Queensland state election: Chatsworth
Party	Candidate	Votes	%	±%
Liberal National	Steve Minnikin	14,614	46.29	−3.54
Labor	Lisa O'Donnell	12,497	39.59	+1.56
Greens	Kathryn Fry	2,941	9.32	−2.83
One Nation	Aaron Clarke	965	3.06	+3.06
Informed Medical Options	Madonna Guy	362	1.15	+1.15
United Australia	Andrew Crook	191	0.61	+0.61
Total formal votes		31,570	97.53	+1.61
Informal votes		800	2.47	−1.61
Turnout		32,370	90.75	+0.65
Two-party-preferred result
Liberal National	Steve Minnikin	16,191	51.29	−1.62
Labor	Lisa O'Donnell	15,379	48.71	+1.62
Liberal National hold		Swing	−1.62	

=== Elections in the 2010s ===
2017 Queensland state election: Chatsworth
Party	Candidate	Votes	%	±%
Liberal National	Steve Minnikin	14,993	49.8	+0.2
Labor	Paul Keene	11,442	38.0	−0.8
Greens	Dave Nelson	3,655	12.1	+3.6
Total formal votes		30,090	95.9	−2.4
Informal votes		1,280	4.1	+2.4
Turnout		31,370	90.1	+1.4
Two-party-preferred result
Liberal National	Steve Minnikin	15,918	52.9	−0.4
Labor	Paul Keene	14,172	47.1	+0.4
Liberal National hold		Swing	−0.4	

2015 Queensland state election: Chatsworth
Party	Candidate	Votes	%	±%
Liberal National	Steve Minnikin	15,216	48.93	−7.11
Labor	Paul Keene	12,255	39.41	+9.95
Greens	Jarred Reilly	2,677	8.61	+2.39
Family First	Aaron Deecke	947	3.05	+1.06
Total formal votes		31,095	98.33	+0.19
Informal votes		528	1.67	−0.19
Turnout		31,623	91.26	−1.09
Two-party-preferred result
Liberal National	Steve Minnikin	15,864	52.62	−11.52
Labor	Paul Keene	14,285	47.38	+11.52
Liberal National hold		Swing	−11.52	

2012 Queensland state election: Chatsworth
Party	Candidate	Votes	%	±%
Liberal National	Steve Minnikin	16,390	55.82	+10.78
Labor	Steve Kilburn	8,694	29.61	−14.26
Katter's Australian	Sarah Henry	1,856	6.32	+6.32
Greens	Jason Cooney	1,836	6.25	−0.79
Family First	Axel Beard	585	1.99	+1.99
Total formal votes		29,361	98.13	−0.11
Informal votes		559	1.87	+0.11
Turnout		29,920	91.89	−0.98
Two-party-preferred result
Liberal National	Steve Minnikin	17,464	63.94	+14.08
Labor	Steve Kilburn	9,848	36.06	−14.08
Liberal National gain from Labor		Swing	+14.08	

=== Elections in the 2000s ===
2009 Queensland state election: Chatsworth
Party	Candidate	Votes	%	±%
Liberal National	Andrea Caltabiano	12,760	45.0	−1.7
Labor	Steve Kilburn	12,431	43.9	−1.0
Greens	Jason Cooney	1,996	7.0	−1.2
DS4SEQ	Jason Furze	799	2.8	+2.8
Independent	Tony Zegenhagen	347	1.2	+1.2
Total formal votes		28,333	98.0	
Informal votes		507	2.0	
Turnout		28,840	92.9	
Two-party-preferred result
Labor	Steve Kilburn	13,561	50.1	+0.0
Liberal National	Andrea Caltabiano	13,487	49.9	-0.0
Labor hold		Swing	+0.0	

2006 Queensland state election: Chatsworth
Party	Candidate	Votes	%	±%
Liberal	Michael Caltabiano	12,909	46.1	+11.1
Labor	Chris Bombolas	12,742	45.5	−10.8
Greens	Elissa Jenkins	2,349	8.4	−0.3
Total formal votes		28,000	98.3	+0.3
Informal votes		471	1.7	−0.3
Turnout		28,471	93.4	+0.1
Two-party-preferred result
Labor	Chris Bombolas	13,807	50.8	−10.6
Liberal	Michael Caltabiano	13,382	49.2	+10.6
Labor hold		Swing	−10.6	

2005 Chatsworth state by-election
Party	Candidate	Votes	%	±%
Liberal	Michael Caltabiano	12,572	48.28	+13.28
Labor	Chris Forrester	11,076	42.54	−13.72
Greens	Elissa Jenkins	1,880	7.22	−1.51
One Nation	Barry Myatt	510	1.96	+1.96
Total formal votes		26,038	98.64	+0.61
Informal votes		358	1.36	−0.61
Turnout		26,396	86.54	−6.76
Two-party-preferred result
Liberal	Michael Caltabiano	13,123	52.49	+13.89
Labor	Chris Forrester	11,878	47.51	−13.89
Liberal gain from Labor		Swing	+13.89	

2004 Queensland state election: Chatsworth
Party	Candidate	Votes	%	±%
Labor	Terry Mackenroth	15,210	56.3	−0.6
Liberal	Andrew Hatfield	9,462	35.0	+8.3
Greens	Rob Wilson	2,361	8.7	+3.3
Total formal votes		27,033	98.0	+0.0
Informal votes		544	2.0	−0.0
Turnout		27,577	93.3	−1.3
Two-party-preferred result
Labor	Terry Mackenroth	15,998	61.4	−3.7
Liberal	Andrew Hatfield	10,056	38.6	+3.7
Labor hold		Swing	−3.7	

2001 Queensland state election: Chatsworth
Party	Candidate	Votes	%	±%
Labor	Terry Mackenroth	14,530	56.9	+8.5
Liberal	Jo-Anne Leu	6,813	26.7	−3.6
One Nation	Gabriel Echaubard	2,813	11.0	−5.4
Greens	Rob Wilson	1,389	5.4	+0.8
Total formal votes		25,545	98.0	
Informal votes		532	2.0	
Turnout		26,077	94.6	
Two-party-preferred result
Labor	Terry Mackenroth	15,555	65.1	+8.2
Liberal	Jo-Anne Leu	8,322	34.9	−8.2
Labor hold		Swing	+8.2	

=== Elections in the 1990s ===
1998 Queensland state election: Chatsworth
Party	Candidate	Votes	%	±%
Labor	Terry Mackenroth	11,953	50.2	−2.1
Liberal	Bruce Martin	6,713	28.2	−13.9
One Nation	Brian Annear-Walker	4,015	16.9	+16.9
Greens	Clare Rudkin	1,126	4.7	+4.7
Total formal votes		23,807	98.3	+0.3
Informal votes		400	1.7	−0.3
Turnout		24,207	93.9	+0.5
Two-party-preferred result
Labor	Terry Mackenroth	13,440	58.7	+4.5
Liberal	Bruce Martin	9,455	41.3	−4.5
Labor hold		Swing	+4.5	

1995 Queensland state election: Chatsworth
Party	Candidate	Votes	%	±%
Labor	Terry Mackenroth	11,342	52.3	−2.7
Liberal	Bruce Martin	9,136	42.1	+18.6
Confederate Action	Peter Ousby	1,221	5.6	+5.6
Total formal votes		21,699	98.1	+0.2
Informal votes		429	1.9	−0.2
Turnout		22,128	93.4	
Two-party-preferred result
Labor	Terry Mackenroth	11,680	54.2	−6.9
Liberal	Bruce Martin	9,859	45.8	+6.9
Labor hold		Swing	−6.9	

1992 Queensland state election: Chatsworth
Party	Candidate	Votes	%	±%
Labor	Terry Mackenroth	11,593	55.0	−6.4
Liberal	Brett Blade	4,958	23.5	−3.7
National	David Stone	3,046	14.4	+3.4
Greens	Lou Gugenberger	1,498	7.1	+7.1
Total formal votes		21,095	97.8	
Informal votes		469	2.2	
Turnout		21,564	93.0	
Two-party-preferred result
Labor	Terry Mackenroth	12,371	61.1	−1.3
Liberal	Brett Blade	7,862	38.9	+1.3
Labor hold		Swing	−1.3	

=== Elections in the 1980s ===
1989 Queensland state election: Chatsworth
Party	Candidate	Votes	%	±%
Labor	Terry Mackenroth	12,647	61.3	+8.5
Liberal	Jack Butler	5,870	28.4	+7.2
National	David Stone	2,125	10.3	−15.7
Total formal votes		20,642	97.6	−0.5
Informal votes		364	2.4	+0.5
Turnout		21,157	93.0	−0.2
Two-party-preferred result
Labor	Terry Mackenroth	12,798	62.0	+4.7
Liberal	Jack Butler	7,844	38.0	+38.0
Labor hold		Swing	+4.7	

1986 Queensland state election: Chatsworth
Party	Candidate	Votes	%	±%
Labor	Terry Mackenroth	9,990	52.8	−4.8
National	Greg Jones	4,921	26.0	+26.0
Liberal	Ian Chandler	4,018	21.2	−21.2
Total formal votes		18,929	98.1	−0.2
Informal votes		364	1.9	+0.2
Turnout		19,293	93.2	+0.6
Two-party-preferred result
Labor	Terry Mackenroth	10,840	57.3	−0.3
National	Greg Jones	8,089	42.7	+42.7
Labor hold		Swing	−0.3	

1983 Queensland state election: Chatsworth
Party	Candidate	Votes	%	±%
Labor	Terry Mackenroth	9,929	57.6	−0.6
Liberal	David Cahalan	7,314	42.4	+0.6
Total formal votes		17,243	98.3	0.0
Informal votes		305	1.7	0.0
Turnout		17,548	92.6	+1.8
Labor hold		Swing	−0.6	

1980 Queensland state election: Chatsworth
Party	Candidate	Votes	%	±%
Labor	Terry Mackenroth	9,256	58.2	+7.1
Liberal	Annette Dunstan	6,646	41.8	−7.1
Total formal votes		15,902	98.3	+0.1
Informal votes		281	1.7	−0.1
Turnout		16,183	90.8	−2.5
Labor hold		Swing	+7.1	

=== Elections in the 1970s ===
1977 Queensland state election: Chatsworth
Party	Candidate	Votes	%	±%
Labor	Terry Mackenroth	7,683	51.1	+6.8
Liberal	David Byrne	7,363	48.9	−6.8
Total formal votes		15,046	98.2	
Informal votes		275	1.8	
Turnout		15,321	93.3	
Labor gain from Liberal		Swing	+6.8	

1974 Queensland state election: Chatsworth
Party	Candidate	Votes	%	±%
Liberal	Bill Hewitt	8,523	65.6	+16.8
Labor	Terry Mackenroth	4,136	31.8	−12.1
Queensland Labor	Mary Scragg	331	2.6	−4.7
Total formal votes		12,990	98.9	+0.2
Informal votes		145	1.1	−0.2
Turnout		13,135	91.5	−2.4
Two-party-preferred result
Liberal	Bill Hewitt	8,798	67.7	+12.6
Labor	Terry Mackenroth	4,192	32.3	−12.6
Liberal hold		Swing	+12.6	

1972 Queensland state election: Chatsworth
Party	Candidate	Votes	%	±%
Liberal	Bill Hewitt	5,658	48.8	−4.0
Labor	H. Zehr	5,095	43.9	+3.9
Queensland Labor	Maurice Sheehan	845	7.3	+0.1
Total formal votes		11,598	98.7	
Informal votes		158	1.3	
Turnout		11,756	93.9	
Two-party-preferred result
Liberal	Bill Hewitt	6,391	55.1	−3.1
Labor	H. Zehr	5,207	44.9	+3.1
Liberal hold		Swing	−3.1	

=== Elections in the 1960s ===
1969 Queensland state election: Chatsworth
Party	Candidate	Votes	%	±%
Liberal	Bill Hewitt	5,632	52.8	+3.5
Labor	John Cleary	4,265	40.0	0.0
Queensland Labor	Leonard Galligan	769	7.2	+0.7
Total formal votes		10,666	98.5	+0.2
Informal votes		167	1.5	−0.2
Turnout		10,833	93.9	−1.4
Two-party-preferred result
Liberal	Bill Hewitt	6,258	58.7	+2.2
Labor	John Cleary	4,408	41.3	−2.2
Liberal hold		Swing	+2.2	

1966 Queensland state election: Chatsworth
Party	Candidate	Votes	%	±%
Liberal	Bill Hewitt	5,149	49.3	−4.6
Labor	John Cleary	4,170	40.0	+0.3
Queensland Labor	Vincent Garrigan	675	6.5	0.0
Independent	Douglas Wallace	445	4.3	+4.3
Total formal votes		10,439	98.3	−0.6
Informal votes		175	1.7	+0.6
Turnout		10,614	95.3	+0.1
Two-party-preferred result
Liberal	Bill Hewitt	5,895	56.5	−2.6
Labor	John Cleary	4,544	43.5	+2.6
Liberal hold		Swing	−2.6	

1963 Queensland state election: Chatsworth
Party	Candidate	Votes	%	±%
Liberal	Thomas Hiley	5,500	53.9	+0.8
Labor	Bob Bradfield	4,048	39.7	+6.0
Queensland Labor	Vince Garrigan	660	6.5	−6.7
Total formal votes		10,208	98.9	+0.1
Informal votes		108	1.1	−0.1
Turnout		10,316	95.2	+0.7
Two-party-preferred result
Liberal	Thomas Hiley	6,037	59.1	
Labor	Bob Bradfield	4,171	40.9	
Liberal hold		Swing	N/A	

1960 Queensland state election: Chatsworth
Party	Candidate	Votes	%	±%
Liberal	Thomas Hiley	5,511	53.1	
Labor	Joseph Ferguson	3,490	33.7	
Queensland Labor	Terry Burns	1,366	13.2	
Total formal votes		10,367	98.8	
Informal votes		132	1.2	
Turnout		10,499	94.5	
Liberal win		(new seat)		
