= Electoral results for the Division of Bonner =

Australian division election results

This is a list of electoral results for the Division of Bonner in Australian federal elections from the division's creation in 2004 until the present.

== Members ==
Member	Party	Term
Ross Vasta	Liberal	2004–2007
Kerry Rea	Labor	2007–2010
Ross Vasta	Liberal National	2010–2025
Kara Cook	Labor	2025–present

== Election results ==
=== Elections in the 2020s ===
==== 2025 ====
2025 Australian federal election: Bonner
Party	Candidate	Votes	%	±%
Labor	Kara Cook	13,583	41.42	+11.52
Liberal National	Ross Vasta	10,494	32.00	−10.32
Greens	Wen Li	4,477	13.65	−4.95
One Nation	Christopher De Winter	1,204	3.67	−2.20
Family First	Ross Dovey	1,040	3.17	+3.17
Legalise Cannabis	Craig Hill	879	2.68	+2.68
Trumpet of Patriots	David Wright	688	2.10	+2.10
Libertarian	Shalini Bhasin	429	1.31	+1.31
Total formal votes		32,794	95.69	−1.79
Informal votes		1,476	4.31	+1.79
Turnout		34,270	30.18	

Results are not final. Last updated on 3 May 2025 at 8:15 PM AEST.

==== 2022 ====
2022 Australian federal election: Bonner
Party	Candidate	Votes	%	±%
Liberal National	Ross Vasta	43,191	44.82	−4.67
Labor	Tabatha Young	28,491	29.56	−1.54
Greens	Bernard Lakey	16,144	16.75	+5.06
One Nation	Amanda Neil	5,371	5.57	+1.57
United Australia	Serge Diklich	3,177	3.30	+0.76
Total formal votes		96,374	97.50	+0.43
Informal votes		2,467	2.50	−0.43
Turnout		98,841	90.57	−2.19
Two-party-preferred result
Liberal National	Ross Vasta	51,471	53.41	−4.00
Labor	Tabatha Young	44,903	46.59	+4.00
Liberal National hold		Swing	−4.00	

Alluvial diagram for preference flows in the seat of Bonner in the 2022 federal election. indicates at what stage the winning candidate had over 50% of the votes and was declared the winner.

=== Elections in the 2010s ===
==== 2019 ====
2019 Australian federal election: Bonner
Party	Candidate	Votes	%	±%
Liberal National	Ross Vasta	46,616	49.49	+3.05
Labor	Jo Briskey	29,291	31.10	−3.76
Greens	Barbara Bell	11,010	11.69	+2.22
One Nation	Ian Symes	3,771	4.00	+4.00
United Australia	Simon Flitcroft	2,394	2.54	+2.54
Conservative National	Alex Maynard	1,105	1.17	+1.17
Total formal votes		94,187	97.07	+0.13
Informal votes		2,840	2.93	−0.13
Turnout		97,027	92.76	+0.82
Two-party-preferred result
Liberal National	Ross Vasta	54,072	57.41	+4.02
Labor	Jo Briskey	40,115	42.59	−4.02
Liberal National hold		Swing	+4.02	

==== 2016 ====
2016 Australian federal election: Bonner
Party	Candidate	Votes	%	±%
Liberal National	Ross Vasta	41,756	46.44	−0.36
Labor	Laura Fraser Hardy	31,344	34.86	−1.15
Greens	Ken Austin	8,518	9.47	+2.63
Family First	Andrew Broughton	3,157	3.51	+1.43
Liberal Democrats	Matthew Linney	2,738	3.05	+3.05
Independent	Jarrod Wirth	2,396	2.66	+2.66
Total formal votes		89,909	96.94	+1.28
Informal votes		2,838	3.06	−1.28
Turnout		92,747	92.01	−2.02
Two-party-preferred result
Liberal National	Ross Vasta	48,002	53.39	−0.30
Labor	Laura Fraser Hardy	41,907	46.61	+0.30
Liberal National hold		Swing	−0.30	

==== 2013 ====
2013 Australian federal election: Bonner
Party	Candidate	Votes	%	±%
Liberal National	Ross Vasta	40,186	46.80	+0.42
Labor	Laura Fraser Hardy	30,927	36.01	−0.06
Palmer United	James MacAnally	6,712	7.82	+7.82
Greens	Dave Nelson	5,876	6.84	−4.34
Family First	Jeff Penny	1,789	2.08	−0.74
Uniting Australia	Jarrod Wirth	386	0.45	+0.45
Total formal votes		85,876	95.66	+0.77
Informal votes		3,895	4.34	−0.77
Turnout		89,771	94.02	+0.57
Two-party-preferred result
Liberal National	Ross Vasta	46,110	53.69	+0.87
Labor	Laura Fraser Hardy	39,766	46.31	−0.87
Liberal National hold		Swing	+0.87	

==== 2010 ====
2010 Australian federal election: Bonner
Party	Candidate	Votes	%	±%
Liberal National	Ross Vasta	38,105	46.38	+4.47
Labor	Kerry Rea	29,639	36.07	−12.73
Greens	Darryl Rosin	9,188	11.18	+6.28
Family First	Carolyn Ferrando	2,318	2.82	+0.89
Independent	Greg Sowden	1,984	2.41	+2.41
Democratic Labor	Utz Wellner	931	1.13	+1.13
Total formal votes		82,165	94.89	−2.14
Informal votes		4,429	5.11	+2.14
Turnout		86,594	93.43	−1.90
Two-party-preferred result
Liberal National	Ross Vasta	43,400	52.82	+7.35
Labor	Kerry Rea	38,765	47.18	−7.35
Liberal National gain from Labor		Swing	+7.35	

=== Elections in the 2000s ===
==== 2007 ====
2007 Australian federal election: Bonner
Party	Candidate	Votes	%	±%
Labor	Kerry Rea	40,784	48.80	+6.05
Liberal	Ross Vasta	35,031	41.91	−2.22
Greens	David Wyatt	4,094	4.90	−0.03
Family First	Stephen Gellatly	1,612	1.93	−2.43
Fishing Party	Shane Boese	1,010	1.21	+1.21
Democrats	Vicki Stocks	837	1.00	−0.40
Liberty & Democracy	Lisa Charles	212	0.25	+0.25
Total formal votes		83,580	97.03	+2.67
Informal votes		2,558	2.97	−2.67
Turnout		83,580	95.31	+0.57
Two-party-preferred result
Labor	Kerry Rea	45,576	54.53	+5.04
Liberal	Ross Vasta	38,004	45.47	−5.04
Labor gain from Liberal		Swing	+5.04	

==== 2004 ====
2004 Australian federal election: Bonner
Party	Candidate	Votes	%	±%
Liberal	Ross Vasta	34,334	44.13	+1.74
Labor	Con Sciacca	33,261	42.75	−2.08
Greens	Elissa Jenkins	3,836	4.93	+1.92
Family First	Trevor Hunt	3,393	4.36	+4.36
One Nation	Barry Myatt	1,436	1.85	−1.87
Democrats	Chad Smith	1,090	1.40	−3.09
Citizens Electoral Council	William Wheeler	451	0.58	+0.58
Total formal votes		77,801	94.36	−1.35
Informal votes		4,651	5.64	+1.35
Turnout		82,452	94.74	−1.14
Two-party-preferred result
Liberal	Ross Vasta	39,298	50.51	+2.40
Labor	Con Sciacca	38,503	49.49	−2.40
Liberal notional gain from Labor		Swing	+2.40	
