= Electoral results for the district of Mooloolah =

Queensland, Australia, district election results

This is a list of electoral results for the electoral district of Mooloolah in Queensland state elections.

== Members for Mooloolah ==
Member	Party	Term
Bruce Laming	Liberal Party	1992–2001

== Election results ==
=== Elections in the 1990s ===
1998 Queensland state election: Mooloolah
Party	Candidate	Votes	%	±%
Liberal	Bruce Laming	12,121	46.71	−17.11
Labor	Marc Zande	6,222	23.98	−2.43
One Nation	Roy Schell	6,173	23.79	+23.79
Greens	Nicholas Redmond	1,432	5.52	−3.01
Total formal votes		25,948	98.62	+0.05
Informal votes		363	1.38	−0.05
Turnout		26,311	92.17	+1.39
Two-party-preferred result
Liberal	Bruce Laming	15,728	65.93	−3.38
Labor	Marc Zande	8,129	34.07	+3.38
Liberal hold		Swing	−3.38	

1995 Queensland state election: Mooloolah
Party	Candidate	Votes	%	±%
Liberal	Bruce Laming	14,398	63.82	+29.53
Labor	Marc Zande	5,957	26.41	−5.41
Greens	Janein McLeod	1,924	8.53	+8.53
Independent	Santo Ferraro	281	1.25	−6.26
Total formal votes		22,560	98.57	+0.62
Informal votes		327	1.43	−0.62
Turnout		22,887	90.78	−0.46
Two-party-preferred result
Liberal	Bruce Laming	15,225	69.31	+6.43
Labor	Marc Zande	6,741	30.69	−6.43
Liberal hold		Swing	+6.43	

1992 Queensland state election: Mooloolah
Party	Candidate	Votes	%	±%
Liberal	Bruce Laming	6,651	34.3	+11.9
Labor	Scott Zackeresen	6,172	31.8	−5.4
National	Kevin Asmus	5,115	26.4	−7.0
Independent	Santo Ferraro	1,456	7.5	+7.5
Total formal votes		19,394	98.0	
Informal votes		405	2.0	
Turnout		19,799	91.2	
Two-party-preferred result
Liberal	Bruce Laming	11,660	62.9	+62.9
Labor	Scott Zackeresen	6,883	37.1	−6.4
Liberal gain from National		Swing	+62.9	
