= 2005 Chandler Ward by-election =

Australian local by-election

← 2004	10 September 2005	2008 →
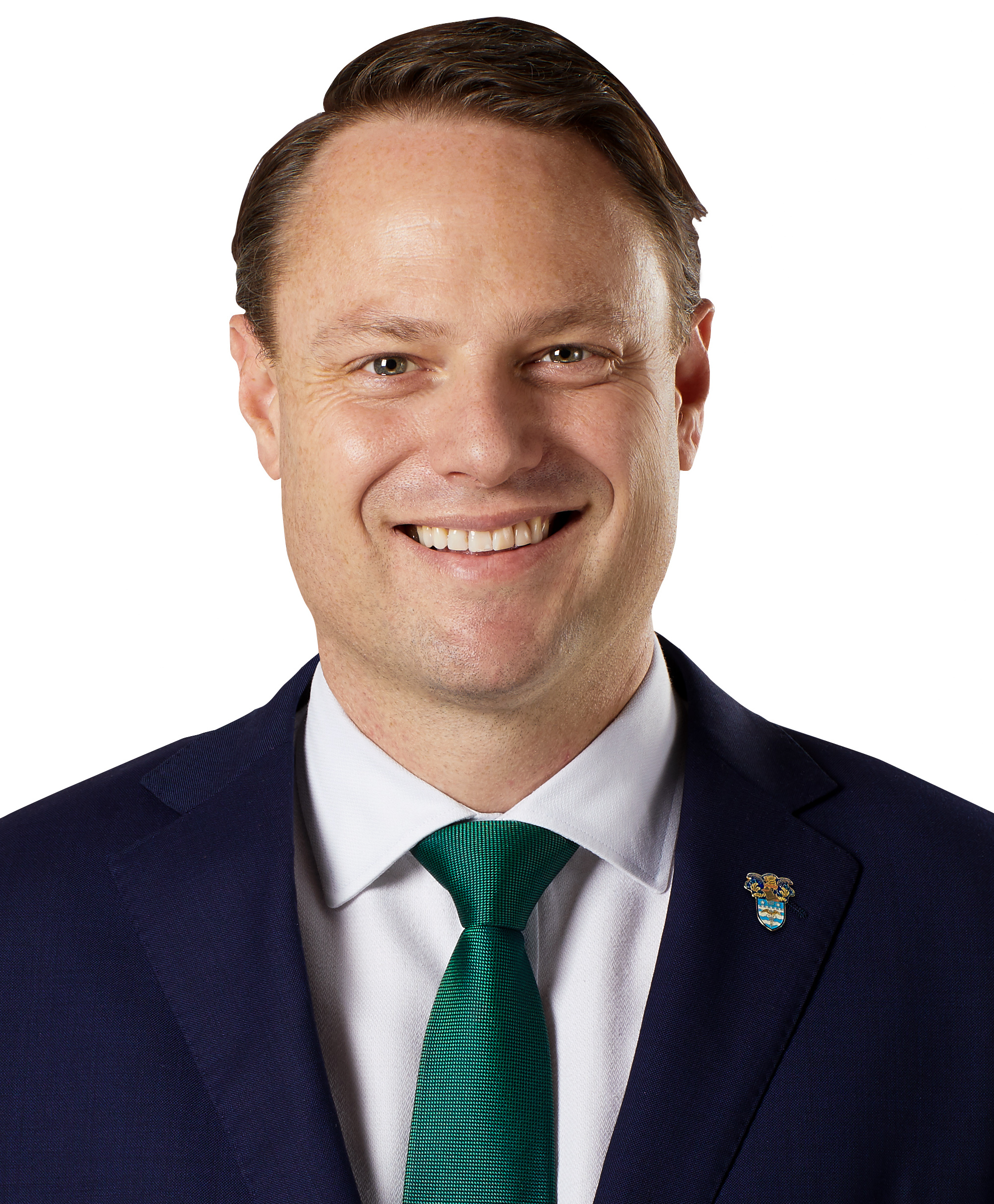

	First party	Second party
Candidate	Adrian Schrinner	Dimitri Helios
Party	Liberal	Labor
Councillor before election
Michael Caltabiano
Liberal
Elected Councillor
Adrian Schrinner
Liberal

The 2005 Chandler Ward by-election was held on 10 September 2005 to elect the next councillor for the Brisbane City Council ward of Chandler, following the resignation of incumbent Michael Caltabiano.

Caltabiano, a member of the Liberal Party, resigned from council after winning the Chatsworth state by-election in August 2005.

The by-election was won by Liberal candidate Adrian Schrinner with 61% of the vote. He became Lord Mayor of Brisbane in 2019 and continues to serve in the role as of 2024.
