= 2005 Chatsworth state by-election =

A by-election was held for the Legislative Assembly of Queensland district of Chatsworth on 20 August 2005. It was triggered by the resignation of sitting Labor member and Deputy Premier Terry Mackenroth.

The by-election was held to coincide with the Redcliffe by-election on the same day. Both contests resulted in the Labor Party losing the seat to the rival Liberal Party. Michael Caltabiano was elected as the new member for Chatsworth.

== Background ==
Terry Mackenroth first entered parliament at the 1977 state election and held the seat of Chatsworth at every election thereafter. When Labor came to power in 1989, Mackenroth became a minister under the premiership of Wayne Goss and remained so until the downfall of the Goss government in 1996. When Labor returned to power under the leadership of Peter Beattie in 1998, Mackenroth was once again made a minister. From 2000 onwards he served as Deputy Premier under Beattie, and from 2001 he was Treasurer.

On 25 July 2005, Mackenroth announced his retirement from politics. He had been planning to wait until the following month, but the retirement of fellow Labor MP Ray Hollis and the resulting cabinet reshuffle caused him to bring forward his own resignation.

== Candidates ==
Labor chose school teacher Chris Forrester to defend the seat they'd held for the previous 28 years.

The Liberal Party chose Brisbane City Councillor—and so-called "factional warrior"—Michael Caltabiano as their candidate. Caltabiano held the council ward of Chandler, which overlapped with the state seat of Chatsworth.

== Results ==
Chatsworth state by-election, 2005
Party	Candidate	Votes	%	±%
Liberal	Michael Caltabiano	12,572	48.28	+13.28
Labor	Chris Forrester	11,076	42.54	−13.72
Greens	Elissa Jenkins	1,880	7.22	−1.51
One Nation	Barry Myatt	510	1.96	+1.96
Total formal votes		26,038	98.64	+0.61
Informal votes		358	1.36	−0.61
Turnout		26,396	86.54	−6.76
Two-party-preferred result
Liberal	Michael Caltabiano	13,123	52.49	+13.89
Labor	Chris Forrester	11,878	47.51	−13.89
Liberal gain from Labor		Swing	+13.89	

== Aftermath ==
The by-election win of Michael Caltabiano, along with that of Terry Rogers in Redcliffe, was a flip for the Liberal Party, who increased their numbers in the Legislative Assembly from five to seven. However, the Liberal Party's hold on these two seats did not last long; both returned to the Labor fold at the 2006 state election.

Labor's unsuccessful candidate for the Chatsworth by-election, Chris Forrester, had initially been chosen to contest Chatsworth again at the 2006 state election. However, he was dumped in favour of media personality Chris Bombolas closer to the election. It was believed that Forrester would be chosen as Labor's candidate for the seat of Bonner at the 2007 federal election instead. However, he lost party preselection to local councillor Kerry Rea. Both Bombolas and Rea went on to win their respective election contests.

== See also ==
- List of Queensland state by-elections
