= Salvatore Vasta =

Australian judge

His Honour Judge Salvatore Paul Vasta is a judge of the Federal Circuit and Family Court of Australia since 2015 and a former Crown Prosecutor of the Queensland Office of the Director of Public Prosecutions. He is the first judge to have been successfully sued in Australia, and has received significant criticism for his handling of several cases. The Australian Financial Review has suggested that Salvatore Vasta may be "Australia's worst judge".

== Family ==
Salvatore Vasta is the son of controversial former Supreme Court judge Angelo Vasta, who was the first judge to be removed by an Australian Parliament following the Fitzgerald Inquiry into Corruption in 1987. His brother is Ross Vasta, Liberal Party MP for the electorate of Bonner His wife is Queensland Magistrate Deborah Vasta, the youngest person admitted to the bar in Queensland.

== Education and early career ==
Salvatore Vasta graduated from the University of Queensland with a Bachelor of Arts in 1984 and the Queensland Barrister's Admission Board in 1990. He started working as a legal officer in the Queensland Office of the Director of Public Prosecutions in the same year before becoming a Queensland Crown Prosecutor, Senior Crown Prosecutor and Principal Crown Prosecutor. He was the deputy chairman and Chairman of the Queensland Cricket Board.

== Federal court appointment and controversies ==
Salvatore Vasta was appointed to the role of Judge of the Federal Circuit Court by attorney-general George Brandis under the Turnbull government (Liberal Party). There have been suggestions that "his elevation had more to do with Liberal Party connections than legal ability." In 2019 it was reported that of over 1,000 cases that have been heard by Judge Vasta, at least 15 had been overturned on appeal and in 2020 that had risen to more than 20.

=== Lysons v Lysons ===
In 2019, while presiding over a case involving the disagreement between a same-sex couple on which school their child should attend, Vasta ordered that the child "be baptised as a Catholic if it is in the view of a priest that it is appropriate for the baptism to occur" to be able to attend a Catholic school, and that the child "was born so that he could be educated in the Catholic tradition", despite neither parents seeking such an order, and that if the orders were not followed the appellant would "spend five years in jail". This case was overturned by the Full Court of the Family Court.

=== Stradford v Stradford ===
In 2018 Judge Vasta presided over a property dispute between Mr Stradford (a pseudonym) and Ms Stradford (a pseudonym). Erroneously believing Mr Stradford had not provided certain financial documents, Vasta sentenced Mr Stradford to 12 months imprisonment for contempt of court. On appeal, Vasta's conduct was described as a “gross miscarriage of justice” and a “lamentable incident” that was “little more than a parody of a court hearing”. Mr Stradford successfully sued Judge Vasta (as well as the Commonwealth of Australia and State of Queensland) for false imprisonment.

On the 12 February 2025 the High Court of Australia granted an appeal (Commonwealth of Australia v. Mr Stradford & Ors / His Honour Judge Salvatore Paul Vasta v. Mr Stradford & Ors / State of Queensland v. Mr Stradford & Ors) and set aside orders made by the Federal Court of Australia on 30 August 2023 and found that judges, including those of an inferior court, are subject to judicial immunity.
