= 2018 Morningside Ward by-election =

Australian local council by-election

← 2016	20 January 2018	2020 →

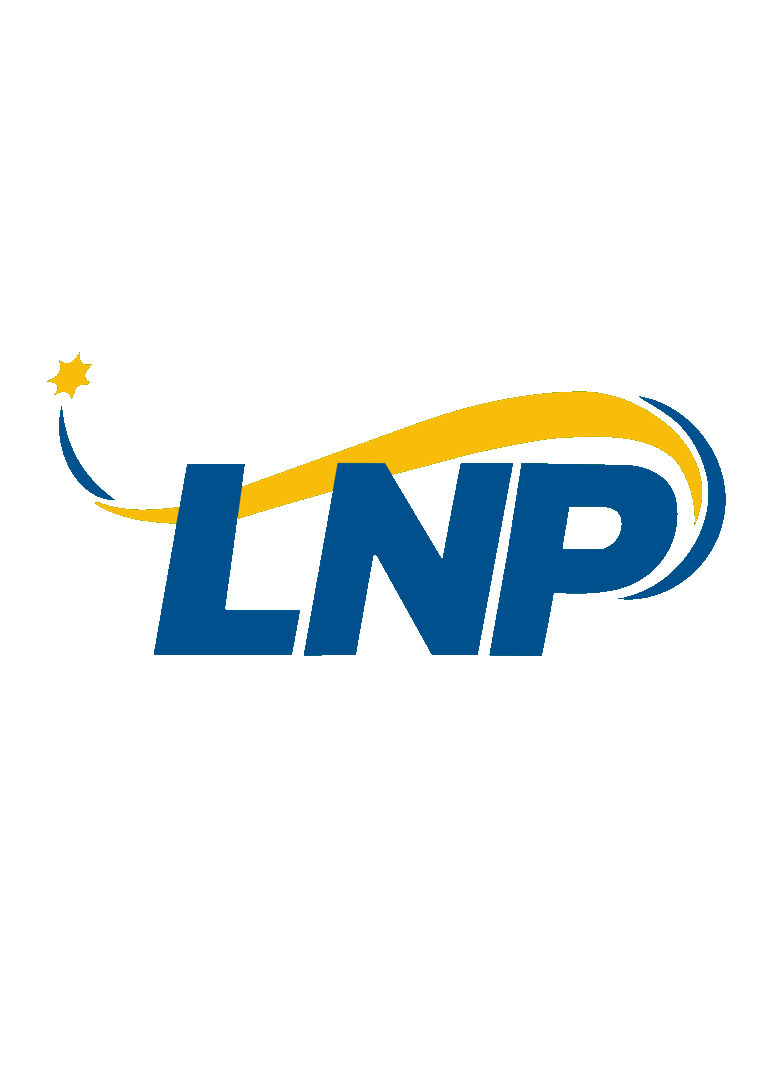

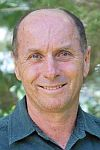
	First party	Second party	Third party
Candidate	Kara Cook	Melina Morgan	Rolf Kuelsen
Party	Labor	Liberal National	Greens
Popular vote	10,241	7,561	2,331
Percentage	50.04%	36.95%	11.39%
Swing	▲1.24	▼3.55	▲0.69
2PP	60.24%	39.76%
2PP vote	▲3.64	▼3.64
Councillor before election
Shayne Sutton
Labor
Elected Councillor
Kara Cook
Labor

A by-election for the Brisbane City Council ward of Morningside was held on 20 January 2018, triggered by the resignation of incumbent Labor councillor, Shayne Sutton.

== Background ==
Shayne Sutton announced her intention to retire as the Councillor for Morningside Ward on Monday 23 October 2017, saying she would stay on "until the state election", assuming the election would be at the start of 2018 and that the by-election could coincide, however, just six days later, Queensland premier Annastacia Palaszczuk called the election for 25 November 2017.

The Electoral Commission of Queensland announced on 2 November 2017, that the by-election would take place on 20 January 2018.

== Key dates ==
- Saturday 16 December 2017 – Issue of writ
- Thursday 21 December 2017 – Close of electoral rolls (2pm)
- Tuesday 2 January 2018 – Close of nominations (12 noon)
- Tuesday 2 January 2018 – Ballot Draw (2:30pm)
- Monday 8 January 2018 – Start of early voting
- Saturday 20 January 2018 – Polling day (8am to 6pm)
- Tuesday 30 January 2018 – Last day for receipt of postal votes

== Results ==
2018 Morningside Ward by-election
Party	Candidate	Votes	%	±%
Labor	Kara Cook	10,241	50.04	+1.24
Liberal National	Melina Morgan	7,561	36.95	−3.55
Greens	Rolf Kuelsen	2,331	11.39	+0.69
Independent	Angus Jell	331	1.62	+1.62
Total formal votes		20,464	98.50	
Informal votes		312	1.50	
Turnout		20,776		
Two-party-preferred result
Labor	Kara Cook	11,999	60.24	+3.64
Liberal National	Melina Morgan	7,919	39.76	−3.64
Labor hold		Swing	+3.64	

== See also ==
- 2016 Brisbane City Council election
