= Con Sciacca =

Australian politician

The Honourable Con Sciacca AO
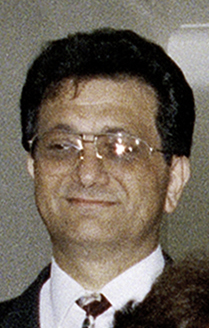
- Sciacca in 1994

Member of the Australian Parliament for Bowman
- In office 11 July 1987 – 2 March 1996
- Preceded by: Len Keogh
- Succeeded by: Andrea West
- In office 3 October 1998 – 9 October 2004
- Preceded by: Andrea West
- Succeeded by: Andrew Laming

Personal details
- Born: Concetto Antonio Sciacca; 13 June 1947 Sicily, Italy
- Died: 21 June 2017 (aged 70) Kangaroo Point, Brisbane, Queensland, Australia
- Party: Australian Labor Party
- Profession: Solicitor

Concetto Antonio Sciacca AO (13 June 1947 – 21 June 2017) was an Australian politician of the Australian Labor Party and member of the Australian House of Representatives from July 1987 to March 1996 and again from October 1998 to October 2004, representing the Division of Bowman, Queensland.

== Early life ==
Sciacca was born on 13 June 1947 in the village of Piedimonte Etneo, Sicily, Italy. He migrated to Australia with his family in 1951 and settled in Queensland, where his father worked as a canecutter. After completion of his law studies, he became a solicitor in 1970 starting his law practice straight out of law school. He founded the group Sciaccas Lawyers which was taken over by the legal group of Shine Lawyers in 2014.

== Political career and recognition ==
Sciacca joined the ALP at the age of 17 and was state president of Young Labor in 1972. He first stood for parliament at the 1969 Queensland state election at the age of 21. He made three unsuccessful bids for the state seat of Redlands beginning in 1977, coming closest at the 1985 Redlands state by-election.

Sciacca successfully contested the 1987 Australian federal election and won the Division of Bowman. He consecutively won the next two elections of 1990 and 1993. He was Parliamentary Secretary to the Minister for Social Security from 1990 to 1994, Parliamentary Secretary to the Minister for Arts and Administrative Services 1993–94, Parliamentary Secretary to the Minister for Administrative Services 1994, Minister for Veterans' Affairs 1994–96 and Minister Assisting the Treasurer for Superannuation 1995–96. He thus served in the Fourth Hawke Ministry, the First Keating Ministry, and the Second Keating Ministry.

Sciacca was defeated by Liberal Party candidate Andrea West in the 1996 election. After his re-election in 1998, Sciacca was a member of the Opposition Shadow Ministry 1998–2001. After a redistribution made Bowman notionally Liberal, Sciacca contested the new Division of Bonner at the 2004 election, but was narrowly defeated by Liberal candidate Ross Vasta.

In 1992, Sciacca's son Sam died of Ewing's sarcoma at the age of 19. Thereafter he started the Sam Sciacca Travelling Fellowship through which health experts would visit Australia and present lectures on the latest developments in research and technology. In 2006, Sciacca was appointed an Officer of the Order of Australia (AO) for "service to ex-service personnel, cancer research institutions and service to the Australian parliament". He dedicated the award to his deceased son.

== Health and death ==
Sciacca was suffering from cancer and in February 2015 was reported to have been cleared of it after an operation performed in 2014. In April 2015 he was operated on by ophthalmologist Bill Glasson for cataracts in both his eyes.

Sciacca died on 21 June 2017, aged 70, after prolonged suffering from cancer at St Vincent's Private Hospital in Brisbane. He had frequently been admitted to the hospital in the last six months for his deteriorating health.

Political offices
Preceded by John Faulkner	Minister for Veterans' Affairs; 1994–1996	Succeeded by Bruce Scott
Parliament of Australia
Preceded by Len Keogh	Member for Bowman; 1987–1996	Succeeded by Andrea West
Preceded by Andrea West	Member for Bowman; 1998–2004	Succeeded by Andrew Laming
