= Angelo Vasta =

Australian judge (1941–2021)

Judge of the Supreme Court of Queensland
- In office 1984–1989

Personal details
- Born: 8 January 1941 Innisfail, Queensland, Australia
- Died: 29 September 2021 (aged 80) Brisbane, Queensland, Australia
- Education: University of Melbourne

Angelo Vasta QC (8 January 1941 – 29 September 2021) was an Australian Queen's Counsel and judge of the Supreme Court of Queensland (1984 to 1989). He was the first superior court judge with an Italian background to be appointed in Queensland, and the second to be appointed in Australia.

== Biography ==
Angelo Vasta was born in Innisfail on 8 January 1941. He completed his education from Melbourne University in 1964. In 1967, he moved to Brisbane where Vasta was called to the Queensland bar in 1968, appointed a QC in 1980, Chief Crown prosecutor in 1981 and appointed to the Supreme Court in 1984. He maintained a successful private practice at the Queensland Bar before retiring on 1 July 2020.

On 24 October 1988, Vasta either stood down or was stood down as a Judge of the Supreme Court of Queensland after evidence of his friendship with the suspended Queensland Police Commissioner Terence Lewis was given at the Fitzgerald Inquiry into police corruption which contradicted statements made under oath during a defamation case in 1986, amongst other behaviours. He was formally removed from office on 8 June 1989 by an Act of the Queensland Parliament, the only occasion since Federation that any parliament in Australia has removed a Supreme Court judge. In 2017, Robbie Katter MP introduced a private member's bill to declare Vasta's removal from office invalid and have it reversed but the bill was subsequently rejected by a parliamentary committee.

Vasta's son, Ross Vasta, was a member of the Australian House of Representatives from 2010 until 2025, having previously served from 2004 to 2007.

Since 1 January 2015, another son, Salvatore "Sal" Vasta, has been a judge of the Federal Circuit Court of Australia with significant controversy surrounding several of his cases. Vasta's daughter-in-law, Sal's wife, is Magistrate Deborah Vasta, a Magistrate of the Magistrates Court of Queensland.

Vasta died in Brisbane, Queensland on 29 September 2021 aged 80.

== See also ==
- List of Australian judges whose security of tenure was challenged
