= Bruce Laming =

Australian politician (1938–2017)

Member of the Queensland Legislative Assembly for Mooloolah
- In office 19 September 1992 – 17 February 2001
- Preceded by: New seat
- Succeeded by: Seat abolished

Personal details
- Born: Bruce Edric Laming; 14 June 1938 Melbourne, Australia
- Died: 11 September 2017 (aged 79) Sunshine Coast, Queensland
- Party: Liberal Party
- Relations: Andrew Laming (son)
- Occupation: Wool classer, soldier

Bruce Edric Laming (14 June 1938 – 11 September 2017) was an Australian Liberal Party politician in the Queensland parliament. Laming held the seat of Mooloolah from 1992 until 2001 and served as Shadow Public Works and Housing Minister and Deputy Opposition Whip. He is the father of Andrew Laming who was elected to the Australian House of Representatives as the member for the Division of Bowman at the 2004 federal election.

The electorate of Mooloolah was renamed Kawana before the 2001 Queensland state election. At the election, Laming suffered an 18.7 percent swing against him and lost the seat to Labor's Chris Cummins.

Laming died on 11 September 2017 in the Sunshine Coast aged 79, after suffering from dementia.

== Publications ==
- Laming, Bruce, "Scheme for jobless also has benefits for business", Business Queensland, 12 May 1997.

Parliament of Queensland
Preceded by New seat	Member for Mooloolah; 1992–2001	Succeeded by Seat abolished
