= Kara Cook =

Australian politician

Kara Cook MP

Member of the Australian Parliament for Bonner
- Incumbent
- Assumed office 3 May 2025
- Preceded by: Ross Vasta

Councillor of the City of Brisbane for Morningside Ward
- In office 20 January 2018 – 2 May 2023
- Preceded by: Shayne Sutton
- Succeeded by: Lucy Collier

Personal details
- Born: 28 June 1985 (age 41) Mackay, Queensland, Australia
- Party: Labor
- Education: Griffith University
- Profession: Lawyer
- Website: https://www.karacook.com.au/

Kara Cook (born 28 June 1985) is an Australian politician. She is a member of the Australian Labor Party (ALP) and has served in the House of Representatives since 2025, representing the Queensland seat of Bonner. She was a lawyer before entering politics.

== Early life ==
Cook was born on 28 June 1985 in Mackay, Queensland. She was raised in Yeppoon. She is the daughter of Denis and Christine Cook. Her father was manager of the Keppel Bay Sailing Club and her mother was a TAFE instructor in early childhood education.

Cook attended St Ursula's College, Yeppoon. She holds the degrees of Bachelor of Laws and Bachelor of Business from Griffith University.

Prior to entering politics Cook worked as a lawyer. She worked as an associate to District Court of Queensland judge Clive Wall and was admitted to practise in 2009, subsequently joining a family law firm. In 2014 she was awarded the Australian Young Lawyer of the Year Award by the Law Council of Australia, at which time she was the principal solicitor for the Women's Legal Service Queensland. In 2016 she established Cook Legal, her own firm in Brisbane, which specialised in domestic violence cases and offered discount fees to victims.

== Local government ==
Cook was elected to the Brisbane City Council at the 2018 Morningside Ward by-election. She was re-elected at the 2020 Brisbane City Council election as Labor's only female councillor and subsequently served as deputy opposition leader. She resigned from the council in May 2023.

== Federal politics ==
In early 2025, Cook won Labor preselection unopposed for the federal seat of Bonner, following intervention by the ALP national executive to remove a competing candidate. At the time of her preselection she was living in the adjacent seat of Griffith. She was elected to the House of Representatives at the 2025 federal election, defeating the incumbent Liberal MP Ross Vasta.

Cook is a member of the Queensland Labor Unity faction, and caucuses with Labor Left federally.

== Personal life ==
Cook is married to Joshua Creamer, a barrister and son of Indigenous activist Sandra Creamer.

Cook was diagnosed with melanoma on three occasions, beginning in 2012.

Parliament of Australia
Preceded by Ross Vasta	Member for Bonner; 2025–present	Incumbent
