= Wylie Gibbs =

Australian politician (1922–2026)

Wylie Gibbs FRCS
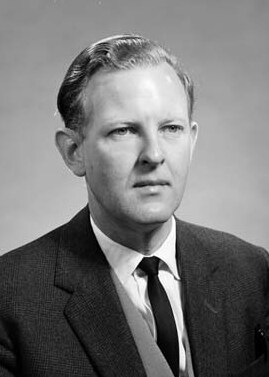
- Gibbs in 1964

Member of the Australian Parliament for Bowman
- In office 30 November 1963 – 25 October 1969
- Preceded by: Jack Comber
- Succeeded by: Len Keogh

Personal details
- Born: Wylie Talbot Gibbs; 26 July 1922 Queensland, Australia
- Died: 9 March 2026 (aged 103)
- Party: Liberal; National (in 1975); Progress (in 1977)
- Spouse: Audrey Wald (m. 1947; died 2015)
- Relations: Harry Gibbs (brother)
- Children: 8
- Education: University of Queensland
- Occupation: Surgeon

Wylie Talbot Gibbs (26 July 1922 – 9 March 2026) was an Australian politician and surgeon. He served in the House of Representatives from 1963 to 1969, representing the Queensland seat of Bowman for the Liberal Party.

== Early life and education ==
Gibbs was born on 26 July 1922. He grew up in Ipswich, Queensland, where his father Harry was a solicitor and member of the Ipswich City Council. His older brother Harry Gibbs (junior) became Chief Justice of Australia.

Gibbs was educated at Ipswich Grammar School before studying medicine at the University of Queensland. Prior to entering politics he was a flying doctor with the Northern Territory Medical Service (1947–48), a house surgeon in London (1949–51), and a surgeon in Ipswich and Brisbane. In 1951 he became a Fellow (FRCS) of the Royal College of Surgeons of Edinburgh and Royal College of Surgeons of England.

== House of Representatives ==
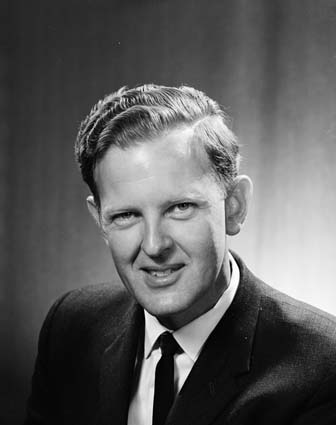
Gibbs in 1964

Gibbs was elected to the House of Representatives at the 1963 federal election, running for the Liberal Party in the Division of Bowman and defeating the incumbent Labor member Jack Comber. He was re-elected in 1966. In August 1965, he used question time to draw attention to the fact that a senior public servant in the Department of Northern Development was a socialist. Gibbs was one of three Coalition backbenchers who visited the unrecognised state of Rhodesia in 1967, along with Jim Killen and Ian Pettitt. He "championed the Rhodesian cause" in parliament and in letters to newspapers, and in 1968 called the United Nations a "menace to world peace" and a "blot on humanity" that had been infiltrated by communists.

Gibbs spoke frequently on health and social services in parliament. He advocated a complete federal takeover of health services from the states, the removal of the means test for pensions, and free medical insurance for people on low incomes. The Canberra Times wrote in 1969 that he had "consistently urged changes in Liberal thinking" and at times had "contrived to sound more like an ALP man than a Liberal". In part due to an unfavourable redistribution, Gibbs lost his seat at the 1969 election. In the lead-up to the election he had crossed the floor to vote with the Labor Party during a debate on electoral redistribution, stating that the electoral commissioners were incompetent.

== Later life ==
After his defeat Gibbs became the executive director of the Australian Pharmaceuticals Manufacturers' Association (APMA). He eventually left the organisation due to his desire to remain involved in politics. Gibbs was one of 30 candidates for Liberal preselection at the 1973 Parramatta by-election. He won National Party preselection for his old seat of Bowman at the 1975 federal election, but withdrew. He later joined the libertarian Progress Party prior to the 1977 election, but was not a candidate.

== Personal life and death ==
Gibbs married Audrey Wald in 1947, with whom he had three sons and three daughters. Their marriage broke up around the time that he lost his seat in parliament and divorced in 1975; Audrey (d. 2015) became a successful artist in later life. They were predeceased by two of their children, Harry in 1979 and Rosamund in 1999. Gibbs later lived in Newport, Isle of Wight.

Gibbs died on 9 March 2026, at the age of 103.

== Works ==
Gibbs published two books:

- Jefferson's Disease: The Causes and Cure of Sickness in Our Body Politic. Trafford Publishing. 2008. ISBN 9781425132811.
- Compassionate Steel: The Memoirs of Wylie Gibbs, Surgeon, Grazier and Federal Politician. Barrallier Books. 2017. ISBN 9780648074588.

Parliament of Australia
| Preceded by Jack Comber | Member for Bowman; 1963–1969 | Succeeded by Len Keogh |
