= Steve Kilburn =

Australian politician

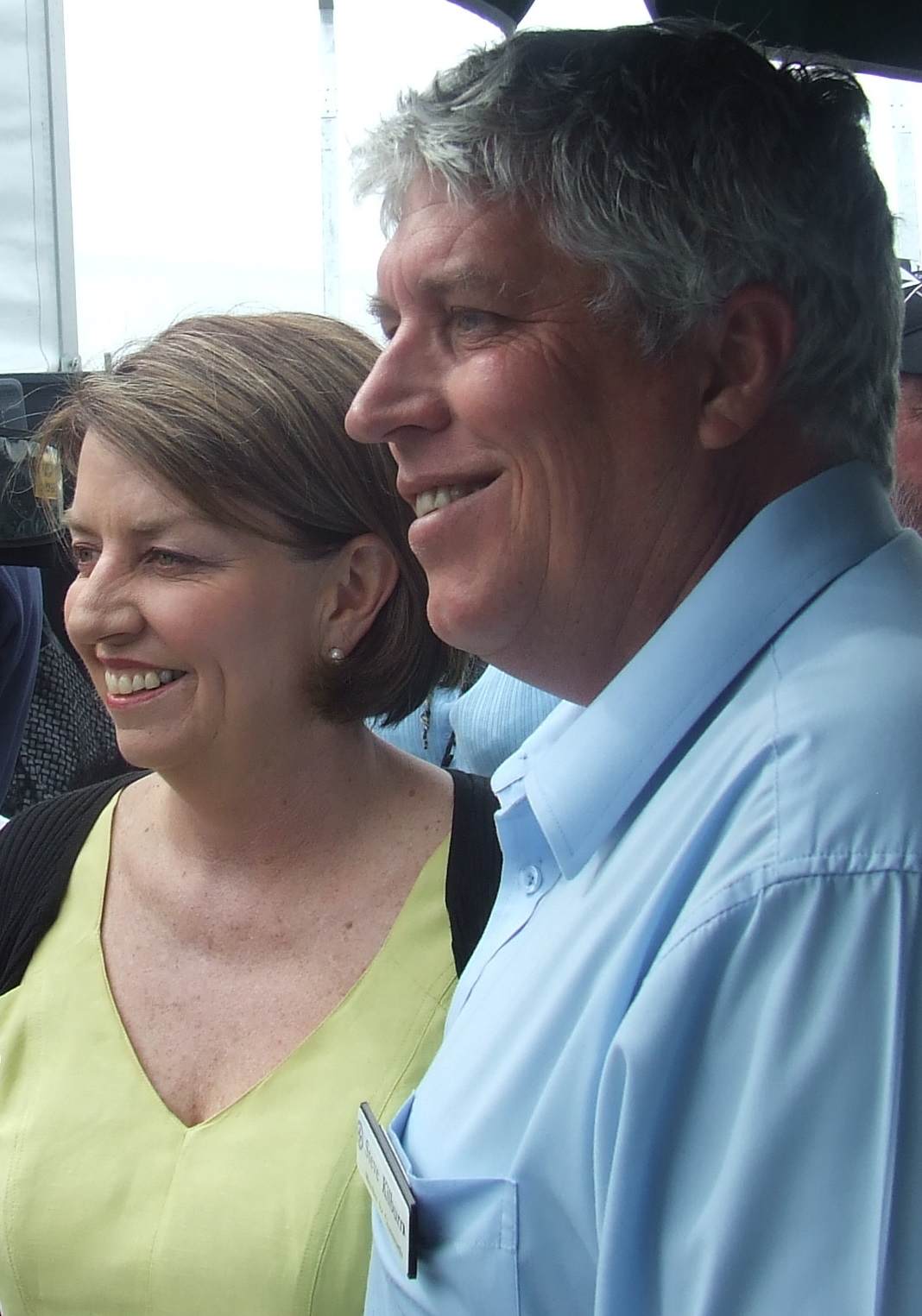
- Steve Kilburn (right) with Queensland Premier Anna Bligh at the opening of the duplicate Gateway Bridge and the renaming of the two bridges after Sir Leo Hielscher in May 2010

Member of the Queensland Legislative Assembly for Chatsworth
- In office 21 March 2009 – 23 March 2012
- Preceded by: Chris Bombolas
- Succeeded by: Steve Minnikin

Personal details
- Born: Steven Andrew Kilburn; 31 January 1963 (age 63) Brisbane, Queensland, Australia
- Party: Labor
- Occupation: Firefighter

Steven Andrew Kilburn (born 31 January 1963) is an Australian politician who was a Labor Party member of the Legislative Assembly of Queensland from 2009 to 2012, representing the seat of Chatsworth.

Born in Brisbane, he served in the navy (1980–89) full-time, and then in the Navy Reserve (1992–2009), receiving a Defence Service Medal. He was a firefighter before entering politics.

Parliament of Queensland
Preceded by Chris Bombolas	Member for Chatsworth; 2009–2012	Succeeded by Steve Minnikin
