= Jack Comber =

Australian politician

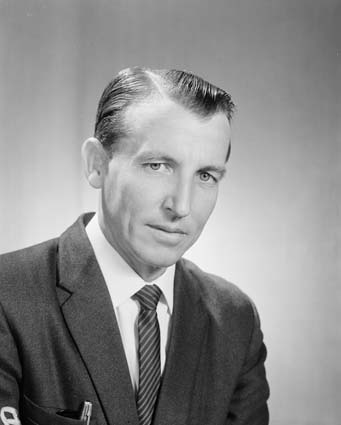

Member of the Australian Parliament for Bowman
- In office 9 December 1961 – 30 November 1963
- Preceded by: Malcolm McColm
- Succeeded by: Wylie Gibbs

Personal details
- Born: Broken Hill, New South Wales
- Party: Australian Labor Party
- Occupation: Insurance consultant

Jack Comber was an Australian politician. Born in Broken Hill, New South Wales, he was educated at St Kevin's College in Melbourne before becoming a shop assistant. He served in the military 1941–46 and returned to become a store manager and insurance consultant. In 1961, he was elected to the Australian House of Representatives as the Labor member for the Queensland seat of Bowman, defeating sitting MP Malcolm McColm. Comber was defeated in 1963 and retired from politics. He died in 1992.

Parliament of Australia
Preceded by Malcolm McColm	Member for Bowman; 1961–1963	Succeeded by Wylie Gibbs
