= Electoral district of Chatsworth =

State electoral district of Queensland, Australia

Chatsworth Queensland—Legislative Assembly
- Map of the electoral district of Chatsworth, 2017
- State: Queensland
- Dates current: 1960–present
- MP: Steve Minnikin
- Party: Liberal National
- Namesake: Chatsworth Road
- Electors: 35,668 (2020)
- Area: 57 km^{2} (22.0 sq mi)
- Demographic: Inner-metropolitan
- Coordinates: 27°30′S 153°8′E
Electorates around Chatsworth:
Bulimba	Lytton	Lytton
Greenslopes	Chatsworth	Capalaba
Mansfield	Mansfield	Capalaba

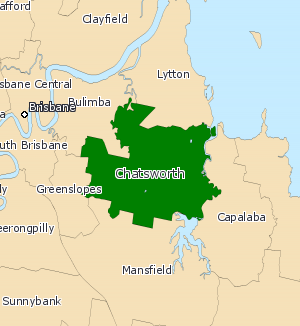
2008 electoral map

Chatsworth is an electoral district of the Legislative Assembly in the Australian state of Queensland. The electorate is centred on the south-eastern suburbs of Brisbane and stretches north to Tingalpa, west to Carina Heights, east to Tingalpa Creek and south to Bulimba Creek.

Unusually for a suburban seat, the district of Chatsworth is not named after a suburb within its boundaries but is instead named after Chatsworth Road. This is despite the fact Chatsworth Road does not fall within the present district of Chatsworth; it runs through the neighbouring district of Greenslopes.

== Members for Chatsworth ==
Member	Party	Term
Thomas Hiley	Liberal	1960–1966
Bill Hewitt	Liberal	1966–1977
Terry Mackenroth	Labor	1977–2005
Michael Caltabiano	Liberal	2005–2006
Chris Bombolas	Labor	2006–2009
Steve Kilburn	Labor	2009–2012
Steve Minnikin	Liberal National	2012–present

== Election results ==
2024 Queensland state election: Chatsworth
Party	Candidate	Votes	%	±%
Liberal National	Steve Minnikin	17,309	52.54	+6.25
Labor	Lisa O'Donnell	10,331	31.36	−8.23
Greens	James Smart	3,479	10.56	+1.24
One Nation	Jasmine Harte	1,031	3.13	+0.07
Family First	Eliza Campbell	796	2.41	+2.41
Total formal votes		32,946	97.39	−0.14
Informal votes		884	2.61	+0.14
Turnout		33,830	91.85	+1.10
Two-party-preferred result
Liberal National	Steve Minnikin	19,264	58.47	+7.18
Labor	Lisa O'Donnell	13,682	41.53	−7.18
Liberal National hold		Swing	+7.18	
