= Malcolm McColm =

Australian politician

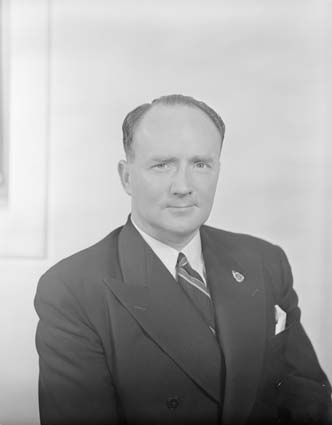

Member of the Australian Parliament for Bowman
- In office 10 December 1949 – 9 December 1961
- Preceded by: New seat
- Succeeded by: Jack Comber

Personal details
- Born: 25 June 1914 Cardiff, Wales
- Died: 2 May 1966 (aged 51) Rabaul, New Guinea
- Party: Liberal Party of Australia
- Occupation: Public servant

Malcolm Llewellyn McColm (25 June 1914 – 2 May 1966) was an Australian politician. Born in Cardiff, Wales, he migrated to Australia as a child and was educated at The Scots College, Warwick, Queensland. He was a bushworker before serving in the military 1936–1946, after which he was a public servant.

In 1949, he was elected to the Australian House of Representatives as the Liberal member for the new seat of Bowman. He held the seat until his defeat in 1961, after which he became a transport and insurance executive.

In January 1966, McColm moved to Rabaul, New Guinea, to become general manager of Rabaul Investments. His company managed a book store, shoe store, and a small plantation. He married Nell Carroll in April 1966, but died in Rabaul on 2 May three weeks after his marriage, aged 51. He was buried in Balmoral Cemetery, Brisbane.

Parliament of Australia
Preceded by New seat	Member for Bowman; 1949–1961	Succeeded by Jack Comber
