= Henry Pike =

Australian politician (born 1987)

Henry Pike MP

Member of the Australian Parliament for Bowman
- Incumbent
- Assumed office 21 May 2022
- Preceded by: Andrew Laming

Personal details
- Born: 16 October 1987 (age 39) Canberra, Australia
- Party: Liberal (LNP)
- Education: University of Canberra; University of Queensland
- Website: https://www.henrypike.com.au/about/

Henry Jon Pike (born 16 October 1987) is an Australian politician who is a member of the House of Representatives representing the Division of Bowman, Queensland, for the Liberal National Party of Queensland from 2022. He sits with the Liberal Party in federal parliament.

== Early life ==
Pike was born in Canberra on 16 October 1987. He holds a Bachelor of Applied Science in architecture from the University of Canberra and a Master of Business Administration from the University of Queensland. He worked for the Property Council of Australia prior to his election to parliament, as a senior policy and communications adviser and later as director of media and communications.

== Politics ==
Pike was a federal vice-president of the Young Liberals in 2013 and Chair of the Liberal National Party Metro South Region Branch in 2021. He was the LNP candidate for the seat of Redlands at the 2020 Queensland state election, losing to the incumbent Australian Labor Party (ALP) MP Kim Richards.

In August 2021, Pike won Liberal National Party preselection for the federal seat of Bowman, following the forced retirement of incumbent MP Andrew Laming after having defeated four candidates in the ballot. In early 2022, police dismissed a complaint against Pike in relation to the preselection process, describing the complaint as “unfounded”. In his maiden speech, he said he made "no apologies" for being a social conservative. In his first parliamentary term, Pike was appointed to the Joint Standing Committee on Treaties, and the Committee on the Implementation of the National Redress Scheme.

Pike retained Bowman for the LNP at the 2022 federal election. Aligned with the National Right faction of the Liberal Party, Pike is associated with the party's religious right and was endorsed by prominent conservative Amanda Stoker.

In January 2023, Pike drafted a bill that would keep Australia Day on January 26.

Parliament of Australia
Preceded by Andrew Laming	Member for Bowman; 2022–present	Incumbent
