= Andrea West =

Australian politician

Member of the Australian Parliament for Bowman
- In office 2 March 1996 – 3 October 1998
- Preceded by: Con Sciacca
- Succeeded by: Con Sciacca

Personal details
- Born: Andrea Gail Kaus; 16 September 1952 Brisbane, Queensland, Australia
- Died: 20 April 2010 (aged 57) East Melbourne, Victoria, Australia
- Party: Liberal Party of Australia
- Spouse: Jeremy West
- Relations: Bill Kaus (father)
- Education: University of Queensland
- Occupation: Schoolteacher

Andrea Gail West (née Kaus; 16 September 1952 – 20 April 2010) was an Australian politician. She was a member of the Liberal Party and served a single term in the House of Representatives, representing the Queensland seat of Bowman from 1996 to 1998.

== Early life ==
West was born in Brisbane on 16 September 1952. She was the daughter of Bill Kaus, who was elected to the Parliament of Queensland as a Liberal in 1966. She held the degree of Bachelor of Arts from the University of Queensland and a diploma from the Mount Gravatt Teachers' College. Prior to entering parliament she worked as a primary school teacher. Afterwards she became a teacher at Qatar International School.

== Politics ==
West served as chairman of the Liberal Party's Cleveland–Ormiston branch. She was elected to the Division of Bowman in the Coalition's landslide victory at the 1996 federal election, defeating the incumbent Australian Labor Party (ALP) member Con Sciacca.

In parliament, West served on the Joint Statutory Committee on the National Crime Authority and the House of Representatives Standing Committee on Family and Community Affairs. She spoke of the need to "safeguard the sanctity of the family" and supported reforms to child support and Australian family law. According to George Brandis, she supported the Howard government's introduction of goods and services tax (GST) despite the impact it was likely to have on her re-election campaign in a marginal seat. Con Sciacca reclaimed Bowman for the ALP at the 1998 federal election.

After her defeat, West remained active in the Liberal Party. In 2000 she unsuccessfully sought preselection for a casual vacancy in the Senate caused by the resignation of Warwick Parer.

== Personal life ==
West lived at Wellington Point with her husband Jeremy and had three children. She died of breast cancer on 20 April 2010, aged 57, at the Peter MacCallum Cancer Centre in Melbourne.

Parliament of Australia
Preceded by Con Sciacca	Member for Bowman; 1996–1998	Succeeded by Con Sciacca
