= Len Keogh =

Australian politician (1931–2007)

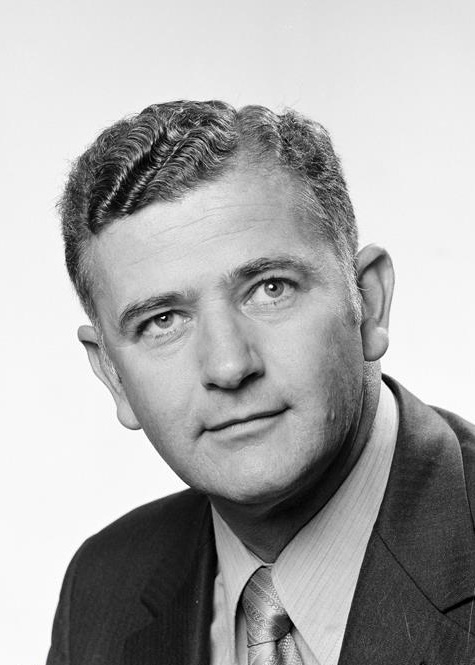
- Keogh in 1970

Member of the Australian Parliament for Bowman
- In office 25 October 1969 – 13 December 1975
- Preceded by: Wylie Gibbs
- Succeeded by: David Jull
- In office 5 March 1983 – 5 June 1987
- Preceded by: David Jull
- Succeeded by: Con Sciacca

4th Chairman of Redland
- In office March 1991 – March 1994
- Preceded by: Merv Genrich
- Succeeded by: Eddie Santagiuliana

Personal details
- Born: 2 June 1931 Brisbane, Queensland, Australia
- Died: 10 October 2007 (aged 76)
- Party: Labor
- Education: St Laurence's College
- Occupation: Draftsman

Leonard Joseph Keogh (2 June 1931 – 10 October 2007) was an Australian politician. He was a member of the Australian Labor Party (ALP) and served in the House of Representatives from 1969 to 1975 and from 1983 to 1987. He represented the Queensland seat of Bowman and later served as president of the Redland Shire Council from 1991 to 1994.

== Early life ==
Keogh was born in Brisbane on 2 June 1931. His father John Keogh was the final mayor of South Brisbane prior to its amalgamation with the City of Brisbane in 1925. He was educated at St Laurence's College, completing his junior certificate in 1947. He worked for Evans Deakin and Company as a structural draftsman, later starting his own concrete company.

== Politics ==
Keogh joined the ALP in 1949 and served on the state executive from 1968 to 1971. He first stood for parliament in the seat of Moreton at the 1966 election, losing to the incumbent Liberal MP Jim Killen.

Keogh won the seat of Bowman for the ALP at the 1969 election, defeating the incumbent Liberal MP Wylie Gibbs. He served on the Commonwealth Immigration Advisory Council and on various parliamentary committees during the Whitlam government, before losing his seat in Labor's landslide defeat at the 1975 election. He was defeated again in 1977 and 1980, in the meantime working as a real estate agent. Keogh regained his seat in 1983 and was re-elected in 1984, serving as chair of the House Standing Committee on Procedure from 1985 to 1987. In 1986 he delivered a report recommended that parliament extend its sitting time by 40 percent.

Keogh was a member of the Centre Left faction of the ALP. In December 1986 he was defeated for ALP preselection by Con Sciacca of the Socialist Left faction, under a factional deal with the Australian Workers' Union (AWU). Keogh disputed the result of the ballot, but the ALP's state appeals committee stated that it could not intervene as no appeal was lodged in time. He subsequently threaten to resign from the party and force a by-election if his preselection was not reinstated. In April 1987, Sciacca resigned his candidacy as part of a further factional deal, with a new preselection ballot being ordered. However, the new deal collapsed and the preselection ballot was cancelled, with Sciacca being chosen as the candidate for Bowman directly by the ALP national executive.

== Later life ==
Keogh was elected chairman of the Redland Shire Council in 1991. He served until his defeat in 1994. In December 1994, he was controversially appointed to the Veterans' Review Board by Con Sciacca, the federal veterans affairs' minister, who had defeated him for preselection in 1987.

Keogh died of prostate cancer in October 2007.

Parliament of Australia
Preceded by Wylie Gibbs	Member for Bowman; 1969–1975	Succeeded by David Jull
Preceded by David Jull	Member for Bowman; 1983–1987	Succeeded by Con Sciacca
