= Ross Vasta =

Australian politician (born 1966)

- Vasta in 2017

Member of the Australian Parliament for Bonner
- In office 21 August 2010 – 3 May 2025
- Preceded by: Kerry Rea
- Succeeded by: Kara Cook
- In office 9 October 2004 – 24 November 2007
- Preceded by: Seat created
- Succeeded by: Kerry Rea

Personal details
- Born: 8 October 1966 (age 60) Melbourne, Victoria, Australia
- Party: Liberal (federal); LNP (state)
- Spouse: Fang Zhao
- Relations: Angelo Vasta (father)
- Children: 2
- Occupation: Company director
- Website: www.rossvasta.com.au

Ross Xavier Vasta (born 8 October 1966) is an Australian politician who was a member of the House of Representatives from 2010 to 2025, representing the Division of Bonner for the Liberal Party. He previously held the same seat from 2004 to 2007.

== Early life ==
Vasta is the son of Angelo Vasta, a former judge of the Supreme Court of Queensland who was removed from office by Queensland Parliament for corruption after his friendship with the disgraced Queensland Police Commissioner Terence Lewis became known. His parents were both born in Innisfail, Queensland, while his grandparents were all born in Sicily. His mother registered him as an Italian citizen by descent when he was a child, but he renounced it prior to his first run for parliament in 2001. Vasta was educated at Villanova College in the Brisbane suburb of Coorparoo, and attended Griffith University, where he graduated with a commerce degree. He ran and operated three family-owned Italian cuisine restaurants named Elio's and worked as a company director before entering politics. He is the brother of Salvatore Vasta, a controversial judge of the Federal Circuit Court.

== Politics ==
At the 2001 federal election, Vasta was the Liberal Party candidate for the Division of Griffith. He was defeated by the sitting member, Kevin Rudd, who later became Prime Minister of Australia.

In the 2004 federal election, Vasta stood for the Liberals in the Division of Bonner, and defeated former Labor minister Con Sciacca. However, in the 2007 election he was defeated by Labor candidate Kerry Rea on a swing of 4.75 points, the lowest swing against a Liberal incumbent in Queensland. Following his election defeat, Vasta won Liberal Party preselection for the Brisbane City Council ward of Wynnum-Manly in Brisbane's east. He was defeated by the Labor incumbent, polling 36% of the primary vote.

Vasta decided to stand in Bonner once again at the 2010 federal election, and reclaimed his old seat by a 53% to 47% margin. He achieved a seven-point swing towards him, one of the highest of any Liberal candidate in Queensland.

Vasta was nominated to the speaker's panel in 2013 and has served as chair of the standing committees on privileges and parliamentary procedure. In 2015 he was a candidate to succeed Bronwyn Bishop as Speaker of the House of Representatives.

Vasta is a member of the National Right faction of the Liberal Party, after previously being aligned with the centre-right faction during the Morrison government years.

== Electoral history ==
House of Representatives
Year	Electorate	Party	First preference result				Two candidate result			
Year	Electorate	Party	Votes	%	±%	Position	Votes	%	±%	Result
2001	Griffith	Liberal	32,249	38.48	▼1.79	Second	37,160	44.34	▼3.23	Not Elected
2004	Bonner	Liberal	34,334	44.13	New	First	39,298	50.51	New	Elected
2007	Bonner	Liberal	35,031	41.91	▼2.22	Second	38,004	45.47	▼5.04	Not Elected
2010	Bonner	Liberal	38,105	46.38	▲4.47	First	43,400	52.82	▲7.35	Elected
2013	Bonner	Liberal	40,186	46.80	▲0.42	First	46,110	53.69	▲0.87	Elected
2016	Bonner	Liberal	41,756	46.44	▼0.36	First	48,002	53.39	▼0.30	Elected
2019	Bonner	Liberal	46,616	49.49	▲3.05	First	54,072	57.41	▲4.02	Elected
2022	Bonner	Liberal	43,191	44.82	▼4.67	First	51,471	53.41	▼4.00	Elected
2025	Bonner	Liberal	35,156	35.47	▼9.35	Second	44,600	45.00	▼8.41	Not Elected

== Notes ==
Parliament of Australia
New division	Member for Bonner; 2004–2007	Succeeded by Kerry Rea
Preceded by Kerry Rea	Member for Bonner; 2010–2025	Succeeded by Kara Cook
