= Kerry Rea =

Australian politician

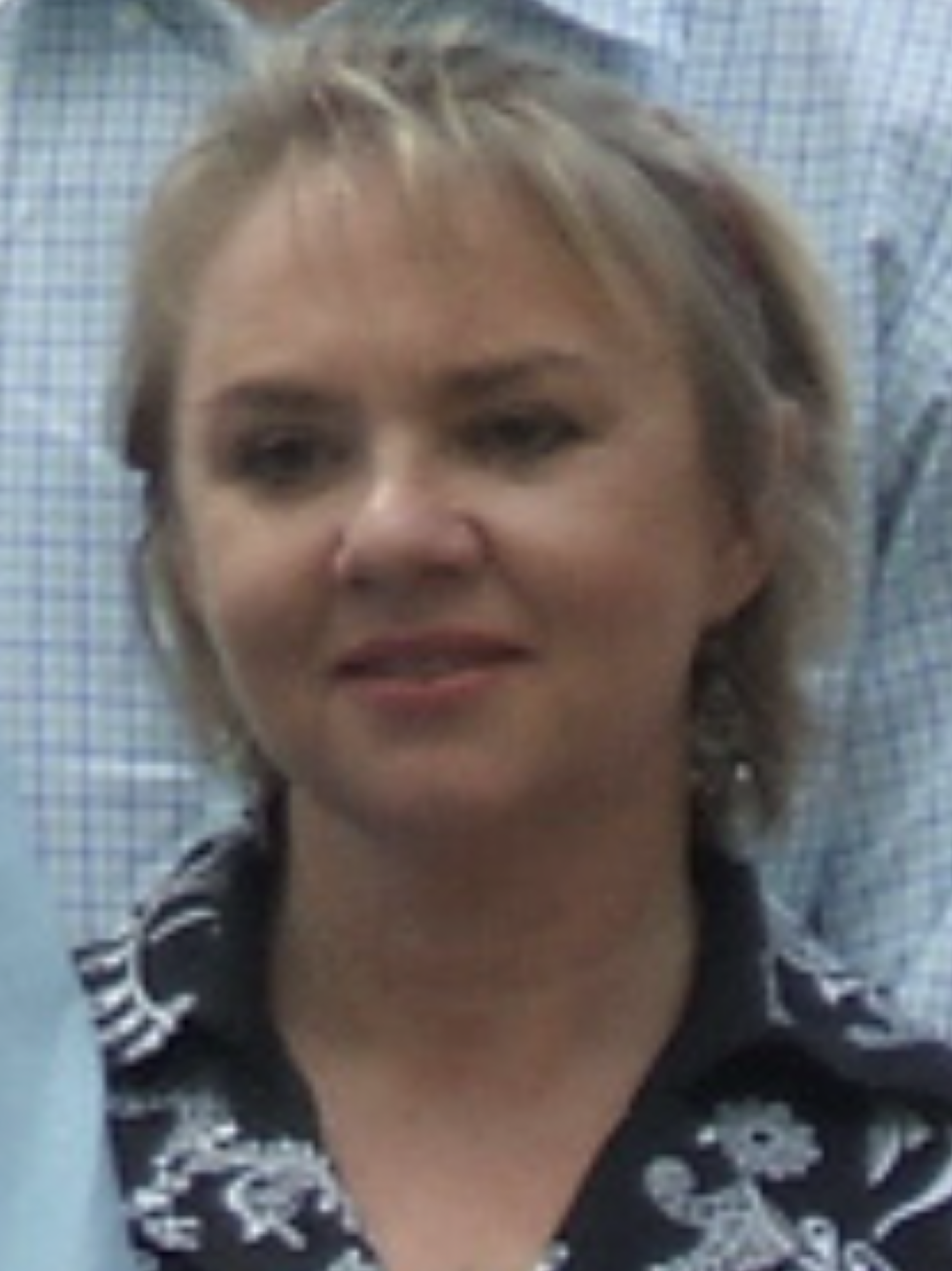

Member of the Australian Parliament for Bonner
- In office 24 November 2007 – 21 August 2010
- Preceded by: Ross Vasta
- Succeeded by: Ross Vasta

Personal details
- Born: 16 April 1963 (age 63) Bundaberg, Queensland
- Party: Australian Labor Party
- Education: University of Queensland
- Occupation: Councillor

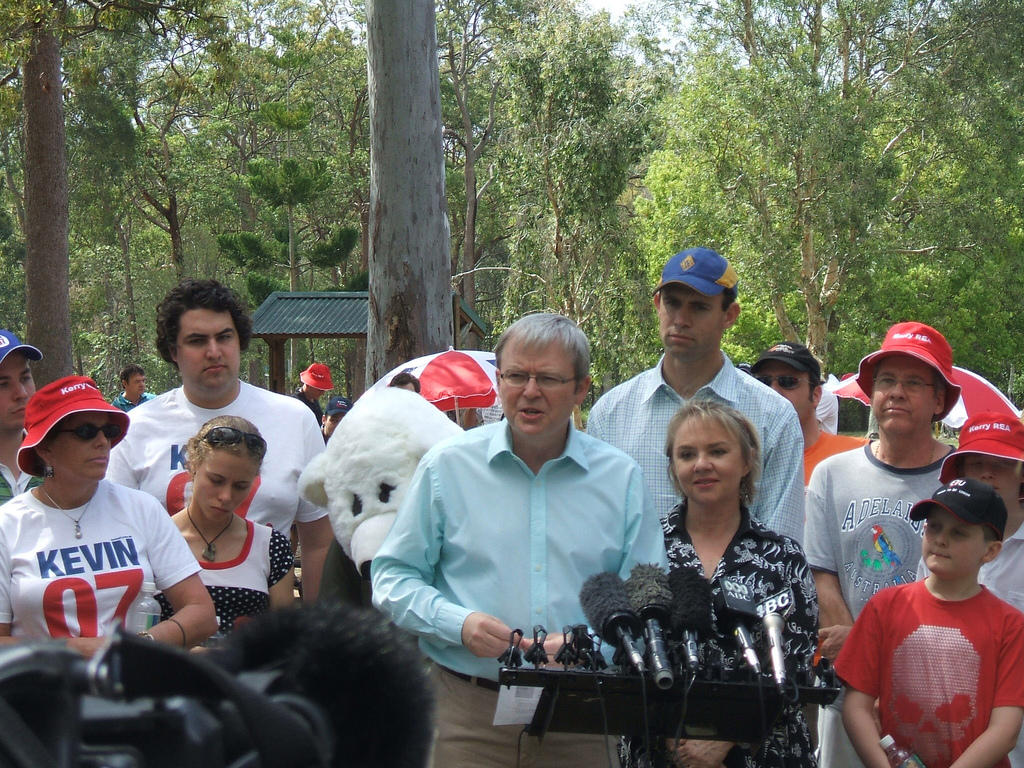
Kerry Rea, standing to the right of the then Opposition leader Kevin Rudd, campaigning in Bonner in September prior to the 2007 federal election.

Kerry Marie Rea (born 16 April 1963) is an Australian politician. She was an Australian Labor Party member of the Australian House of Representatives from 2007 to 2010, representing the Division of Bonner in Queensland.

== Early life ==
Rea was born in Bundaberg, Queensland. As an adult, she and her siblings discovered that her mother's grandmother Nellie Richards was an Indigenous Australian from Central Queensland. Rea was educated by nuns at the Mount Carmel Convent in Wynnum. She holds the degree of Bachelor of Arts from the University of Queensland.

== Politics ==
Before gaining elected office, Rea worked for a Queensland State Minister.

She was then elected as a Brisbane City councillor, representing the ward of Ekibin from 1991 to 1994 and the ward of Holland Park from 1997 to 2007.

Rea won the seat of Bonner for the Labor Party from the Liberal Party at the 2007 federal election. It was one of a number of Labor gains at that election which propelled the party from opposition to government. Rea lost the seat to Ross Vasta at the 2010 election.

== Education ==
Rea graduated from school in Wynnum, and later studied at the University of Queensland for a Bachelor of Arts majoring in English, History and Philosophy.

== Personal life ==
Rea is married to Ian and she has three children. The eldest being Emma Mallory; a Brisbane-based actress, writer and producer.

Parliament of Australia
Preceded by Ross Vasta	Member for Bonner; 2007–2010	Succeeded by Ross Vasta
