= Chris Bombolas =

Australian politician

Member of the Queensland Legislative Assembly for Chatsworth
- In office 9 September 2006 – 20 March 2009
- Preceded by: Michael Caltabiano
- Succeeded by: Steve Kilburn

Personal details
- Born: Chris Bombolas; 12 May 1960 (age 66) Newcastle, New South Wales, Australia
- Party: Labor
- Relations: Dustin Walker - son
- Education: Queensland Institute of Technology
- Occupation: Media industry

Chris Bombolas (born 12 May 1960) (often known as Bomber) is a communications and media specialist, and a television and radio presenter. A former sports reporter for 21 years with the Nine Network in Brisbane. A former Australian politician, he served for one term as the Labor member for Chatsworth in the Legislative Assembly of Queensland from 2006 to 2009.

== Early life ==
Bombolas was born in Newcastle, New South Wales. He attended Cannon Hill State School followed by Brisbane State High School.

He graduated from the Queensland University of Technology with a Bachelor of Business (Communications) which he completed while working for the Queensland Police Service.

== Career ==
He became a radio host and worked for 4BC, 4BK and Triple M, before joining the Channel Nine as a sports presenter.

In July 2006, Bombolas believed he could "make a difference in my community", and announced his intention to run for the Labor in the seat of Chatsworth in the 2006 election. Bombolas won the seat against the incumbent member Michael Caltabiano of the Liberal Party.

On 9 July 2007, Bombolas became Parliamentary Secretary for the Minister for Sport and Local Government, Andrew Fraser. Bombolas announced on 19 February 2009 that he would not contest the 2009 state election.

In June 2009, Bombolas became the Chairman of the A-league football club Brisbane Roar. His controversial decision to replace coach Frank Farina with Ange Postecoglou saw the Brisbane Roar win the record for the longest unbeaten run at the top level of any Australian football code, which stands at 36 league matches without defeat.[3] Brisbane Roar are also the first and only club to win back to back A-League Championships.[4]

In 2012, Bombolas joined Hancock Coal/GVK to work as External Affairs Advisor (Media & Corporate Communications Advisor).

He now works as a freelance Media and Communications Specialist and is a qualified Auctioneer.

Parliament of Queensland
Preceded by Michael Caltabiano	Member for Chatsworth; 2006–2009	Succeeded by Steve Kilburn
