= Division of Bowman =

Australian federal electoral division

Coordinates: 27.580°S 153.242°E

Bowman Australian House of Representatives Division
- Interactive map of boundaries since the 2019 federal election
- Created: 1949
- MP: Henry Pike
- Party: Liberal (Note: Member of the Liberal National Party of Queensland who sits with the parliamentary Liberal Party.)
- Namesake: David Bowman
- Electors: 122,978 (2025)
- Area: 536 km^{2} (207.0 sq mi)
- Demographic: Outer metropolitan

The Division of Bowman is an Australian Electoral Division in Queensland. The current MP is Henry Pike of the Liberal Party.

== Geography ==
Since 1984, federal electoral division boundaries in Australia have been determined at redistributions by a redistribution committee appointed by the Australian Electoral Commission. Redistributions occur for the boundaries of divisions in a particular state, and they occur every seven years, or sooner if a state's representation entitlement changes or when divisions of a state are malapportioned.

Bowman’s boundaries are largely consistent with those of Redland City, including Cleveland and North Stradbroke Island.

== History ==
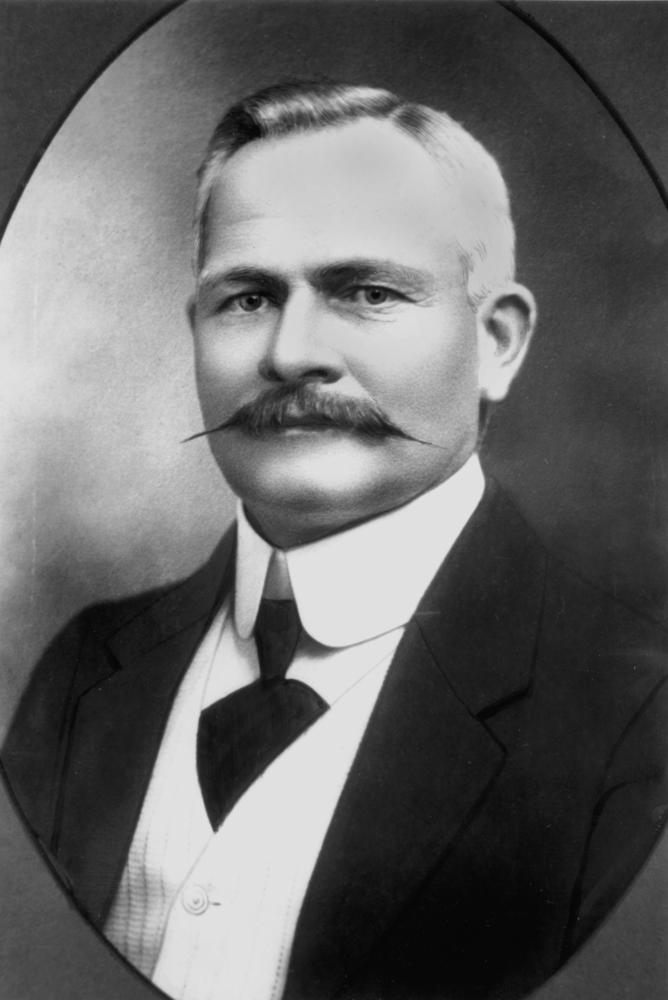
David Bowman, the division's namesake

The division was created in 1949 and is named for David Bowman, an early leader of the Australian Labor Party, in Queensland. The seat consists of the entirety of Redland City, located in the eastern suburbs of Brisbane, and includes the suburbs of Capalaba, Cleveland, Redland Bay, Birkdale, Thorneside, Alexandra Hills, Thornlands, Mount Cotton, Ormiston, Wellington Point and Victoria Point. The division also incorporates various islands of Moreton Bay including Coochiemudlo Island, the inhabited southern Bay Islands (Russell, Karragarra, Macleay and Lamb) and the big tourist destination of North Stradbroke Island.

It is generally a residential electorate with some crops, poultry, various light industries and tourism.

Bowman has traditionally been a highly marginal seat, regularly changing hands between the Australian Labor Party and the Liberal Party. Notably, the electorate has been won by the party with the largest national two party preferred vote at every election from 1954 to 2001 (except 1990). However, in the 2004 election, an energetic campaign by Dr Andrew Laming, and an electoral redistribution (due to the creation of the new Division of Bonner, leading veteran Bowman MP Con Sciacca to contest this new seat), saw Bowman returned to the Liberal Party by a significant margin (59.12% 2PP). The division was then considered by pollsters such as Antony Green to be a fairly safe Liberal seat.

In the 2007 election, the electorate experienced a strong swing of 8.86% towards the Australian Labor Party; the incumbent Laming held the seat by 0.04%, or 64 votes. This made it second only to McEwen as the most marginal seat in the country, although the 2009 electoral redistribution in Queensland saw the margin notionally reduced further, to effectively 0.005%, making Bowman Australia's most marginal seat at the time. Laming went on to retain the seat comfortably for the Liberal National Party of Queensland in: 2010, regaining ground with a 9.51% swing towards him; 2013, despite a 6.35% swing against him; and 2016, when all parties saw a positive swing in Bowman (for the first time since 1955), due to the absence of a Palmer United Party candidate.

== Members ==
Image	Member	Party	Term	Notes
	Malcolm McColm (1914–1966)	Liberal	10 December 1949 – 9 December 1961	Lost seat
	Jack Comber (1919–1992)	Labor	9 December 1961 – 30 November 1963	Lost seat
	Wylie Gibbs (1922–2026)	Liberal	30 November 1963 – 25 October 1969	Lost seat
	Len Keogh (1931–2007)	Labor	25 October 1969 – 13 December 1975	Lost seat
	David Jull (1944–2011)	Liberal	13 December 1975 – 5 March 1983	Lost seat. Later elected to the Division of Fadden in 1984
	Len Keogh (1931–2007)	Labor	5 March 1983 – 5 June 1987	Lost preselection and retired
	Con Sciacca (1947–2017)	Labor	11 July 1987 – 2 March 1996	Served as minister under Keating. Lost seat
	Andrea West (1952–2010)	Liberal	2 March 1996 – 3 October 1998	Lost seat
	Con Sciacca (1947–2017)	Labor	3 October 1998 – 31 August 2004	Did not contest in 2004. Failed to win the Division of Bonner
	Andrew Laming (1966–)	Liberal (Note: Laming was a member of the Liberal National Party of Queensland from its creation in 2009 but retained membership of the federal parliamentary Liberal Party.)	9 October 2004 – 11 April 2022	Lost preselection and retired
	Henry Pike (1987–)	Liberal	21 May 2022 – present	Incumbent

== Election results ==
2025 Australian federal election: Bowman
Party	Candidate	Votes	%	±%
Liberal National	Henry Pike	42,777	39.61	−2.76
Labor	Darcy Brown	34,247	31.71	+2.51
Greens	Kristie Lockhart	12,689	11.75	−1.27
One Nation	Matthew Knight	7,650	7.08	−0.61
Trumpet of Patriots	Gary Williamson	3,924	3.63	+3.63
Independent	Shaun Holloway	3,375	3.13	+3.13
Family First	David Todd	3,325	3.08	+3.08
Total formal votes		107,987	96.44	−0.65
Informal votes		3,986	3.56	+0.65
Turnout		111,973	91.08	+0.57
Two-party-preferred result
Liberal National	Henry Pike	56,615	52.43	−3.08
Labor	Darcy Brown	51,372	47.57	+3.08
Liberal National hold		Swing	−3.08	
