= Michael Caltabiano =

Australian politician

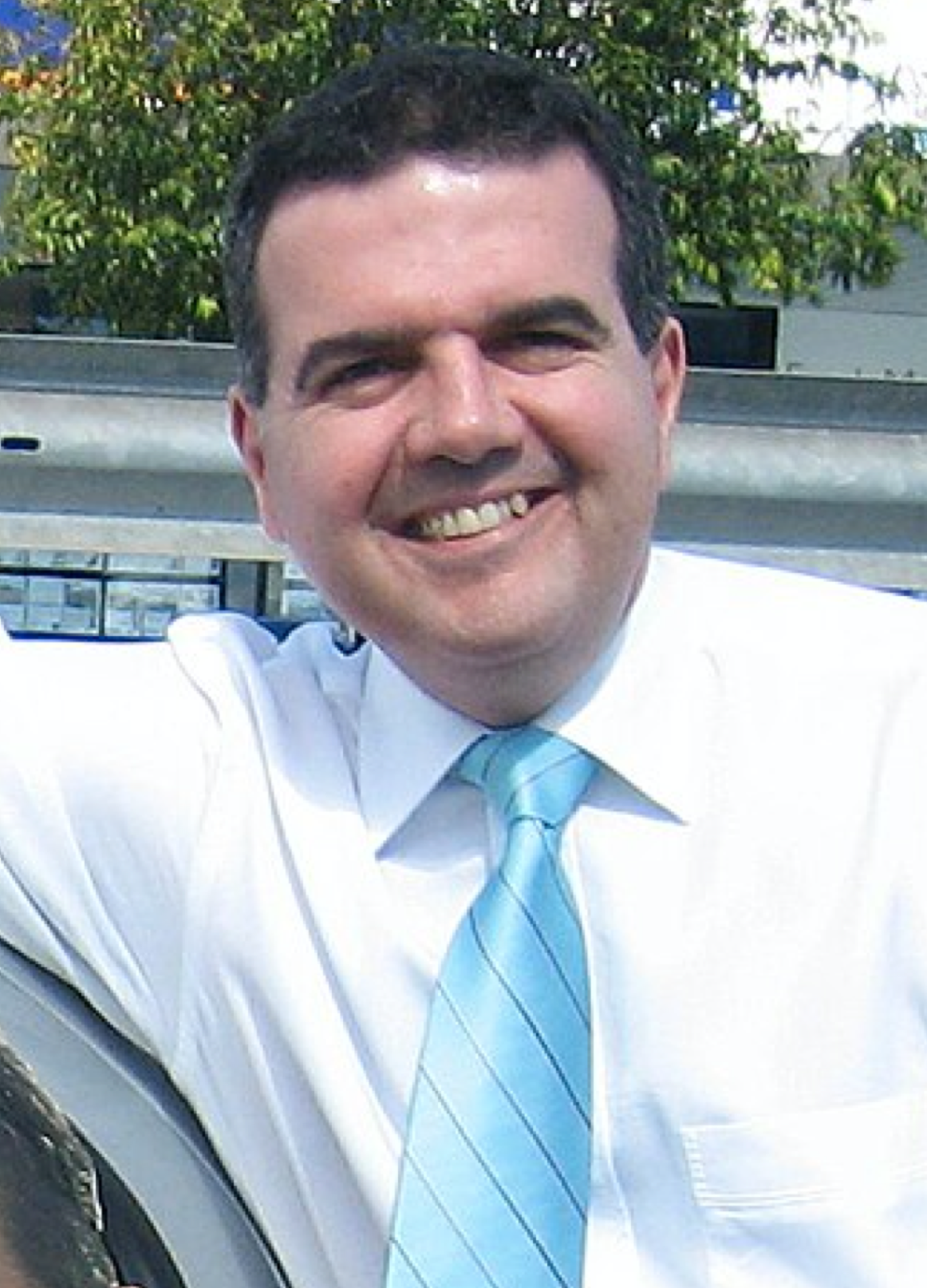

Shadow Treasurer of Queensland
- In office 8 August 2006 – 9 September 2006
- Leader: Lawrence Springborg
- Preceded by: Bob Quinn
- Succeeded by: Bruce Flegg

Shadow Minister for Transport of Queensland
- In office 28 September 2005 – 8 August 2006
- Leader: Lawrence Springborg
- Preceded by: Fiona Simpson
- Succeeded by: Fiona Simpson

Member of the Queensland Legislative Assembly for Chatsworth
- In office 20 August 2005 – 9 September 2006
- Preceded by: Terry Mackenroth
- Succeeded by: Chris Bombolas

Councillor of the City of Brisbane for Chandler Ward
- In office 12 March 1996 – 10 September 2005
- Preceded by: Graeme McDougall
- Succeeded by: Adrian Schrinner

Personal details
- Born: Michael Andrew Caltabiano; 8 April 1964 (age 62) Townsville, Queensland, Australia
- Party: Liberal Party
- Occupation: Engineer, Company director

Michael Andrew Caltabiano (born 8 April 1964) is an Australian former politician who was a Liberal Party member of the Brisbane City Council from 1996 to 2005, and a Liberal member of the Legislative Assembly of Queensland from 2005 to 2006. He also served briefly as the Director-General of the Department of Transport and Main Roads in the state government of Queensland, Australia until he was sacked by Premier Campbell Newman. Caltabiano was referred to the parliamentarian ethics committee in October 2012, after comments he made two year previously to a parliamentary estimates committee hearing about the employment of Ben Gommers, the son of then arts minister Ros Bates.

== Early life ==
Caltabiano studied engineering at James Cook University and a Master of Philosophy at Nottingham University (UK) and completed a Graduate Diploma of Business at Queensland University of Technology. He worked as a civil engineer and company director.

== Political career ==
He was appointed as a replacement Liberal Party Councillor for Chandler Ward of the Brisbane City Council in 1996. Caltabiano replaced Liberal Graeme McDougall, who was elected to the Commonwealth seat of Griffith and had to resign his Council seat. Caltabiano subsequently won the 1997, 2000 and 2004 elections.

Caltabiano served as Leader of the Opposition in Brisbane City Council from 2000 until 2002, when he was ousted during a factional deal involving a dispute over representation on the State Liberal Council. He was replaced by Margaret De Wit in 2002, who was in turn replaced by Graham Quirk in 2003. He was responsible for writing many of the policies for Lord Mayoral candidate Campbell Newman and was directly responsible for writing the 2004-05 Budget as presented to Council (normally this is the Lord Mayor's duty; however, Newman preferred to leave this responsibility to other Liberal councillors.).

He was also actively involved in party politics, serving as Queensland state president of the Liberal Party from 2003 to 2006.

In mid-2005, Labor Deputy Premier Terry Mackenroth resigned from politics, sparking a by-election in the seat of Chatsworth, which included Caltabiano's council ward. Caltabiano was preselected as the Liberal candidate, and faced Labor candidate Chris Forrester, who he had defeated in the previous council election. The Labor government was struggling in the polls at the time, and Caltabiano won the seat with 52.35% of the vote.

Caltabiano was appointed to the shadow ministry upon his election, taking on the role of Shadow Minister for Transport. He was widely viewed as a rising star in the party and had been tipped as a future Liberal leader. In August 2006, following the accession of Bruce Flegg to the Liberal leadership, Caltabiano was promoted to Shadow Treasurer.

Premier Peter Beattie called an election for 9 September 2006 and Labor preselected Chris Bombolas, a high-profile sports presenter, as its candidate. The Liberals struggled with a series of early gaffes. After a close race, Bombolas succeeded in taking the seat by several hundred votes. His wife Andrea was defeated as the Liberal National Party candidate in Chatsworth for the 2009 state election.

Following the landslide Liberal National Party win in the 2012 state election, newly elected Premier Campbell Newman announced that Caltabiano would be appointed as Director-General of the Department of Transport and Main Roads.

== Investigation ==
On 25 October 2012, Caltabiano was stood down as Director-General of the Department of Transport and Main Roads pending the result of an investigation into allegations of lying to parliament in budget estimate hearings

== Industrial career ==
Caltabiano was involved with a political consultancy firm, Entree Vous. From June 2008 until he took over as Director-General of the Department of Transport and Main Roads, he was managing director of Infrastructure Delivery Pty Ltd. Following his being stood down (see 'Investigation' above) he became CEO of the Australian Asphalt Pavement Association in January 2014. In October 2016, the ARRB Group (formerly the Australian Road Research Board) announced that Caltabiano would be its next CEO, even though he had only been a board member since June of that year. He replaced retiring managing director, Gerald Waldron, in November 2016.

Parliament of Queensland
Preceded by Terry Mackenroth	Member for Chatsworth; 2005–2006	Succeeded by Chris Bombolas
