= Electoral district of Mooloolah =

- Created: 1992
- Abolished: 2001
- Namesake: Mooloolah, Queensland

Mooloolah was an electoral district of the Legislative Assembly in the Australian state of Queensland from 1992 to 2001.

The district was situated in the Sunshine Coast and named for the community of Mooloolah.

== Members for Mooloolah ==
Member	Party	Term
Bruce Laming	Liberal	1992–2001

== See also ==
- Electoral districts of Queensland
- Members of the Queensland Legislative Assembly by year
- Category:Members of the Queensland Legislative Assembly by name
