= Division of Bonner =

Australian federal electoral division

Coordinates: 27.500°S 153.138°E

Bonner Australian House of Representatives Division
- Interactive map of boundaries since the 2019 federal election
- Created: 2004
- MP: Kara Cook
- Party: Labor
- Namesake: Neville Bonner
- Electors: 113,535 (2025)
- Area: 374 km^{2} (144.4 sq mi)
- Demographic: Outer metropolitan
Electorates around Bonner:
Griffith	Lilley	Moreton Bay
Griffith	Bonner	Coral Sea
Moreton	Rankin	Bowman

The Division of Bonner is an Australian Electoral Division in Queensland, located in the eastern suburbs of Brisbane, including the suburbs of Chandler, Carindale, Manly, Mansfield, Mount Gravatt, Wishart and Wynnum. The current MP is Kara Cook of the Labor Party.

== Geography ==
Federal electoral division boundaries in Australia are determined at redistributions by a redistribution committee appointed by the Australian Electoral Commission. Redistributions occur for the boundaries of divisions in a particular state, and they occur every seven years, or sooner if a state's representation entitlement changes or when divisions of a state are malapportioned.

== History ==
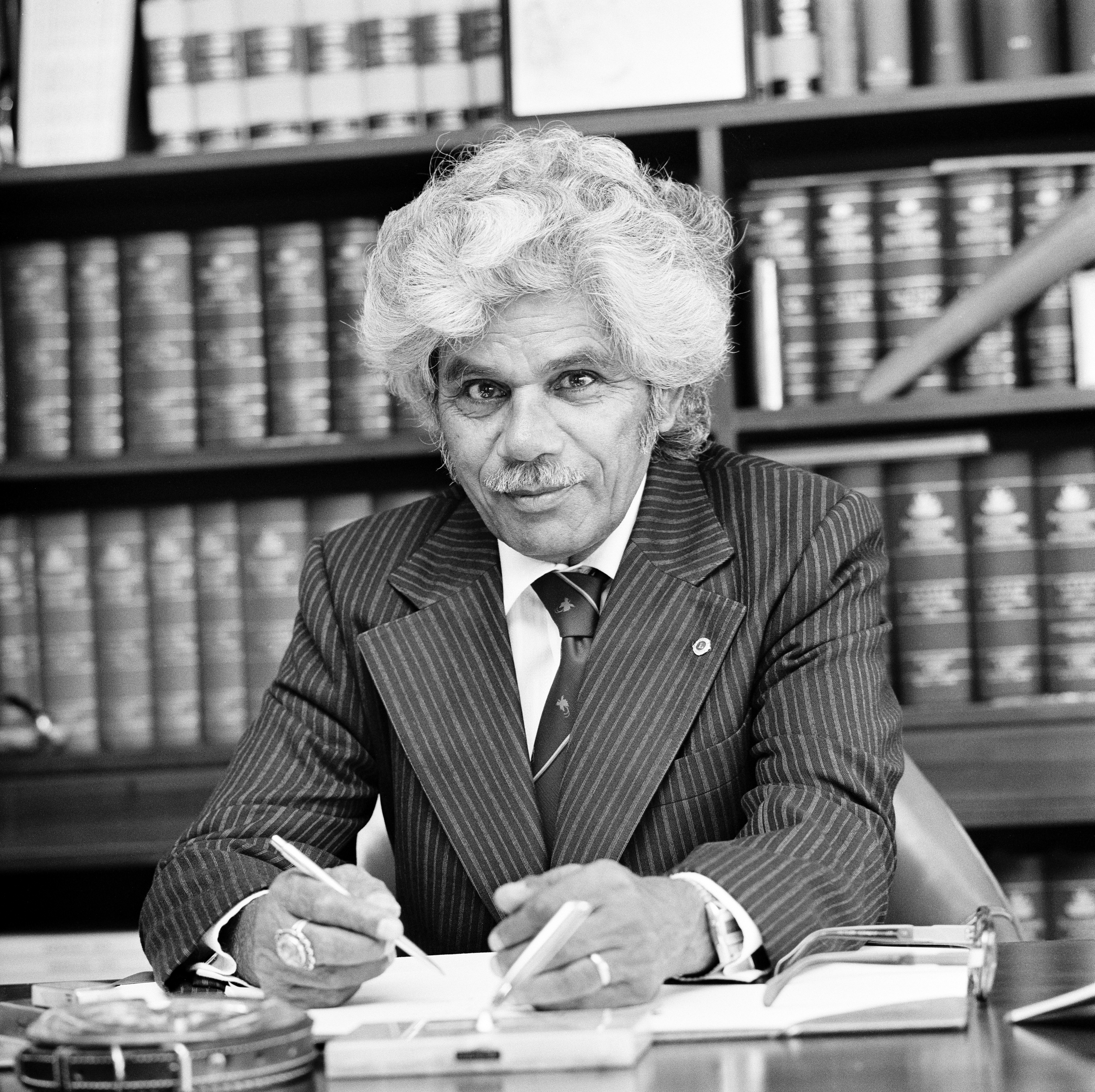
Neville Bonner, the division's namesake

The division was created in 2004 and is named after Neville Bonner, the first Aboriginal Australian person to serve in the Australian Parliament. Bonner served in the federal Senate as a Queensland Liberal Senator.

The seat had a notional Labor majority when it was created, but was won by the Liberal Party in 2004 by a slight margin. Kerry Rea regained the seat for Labor in 2007. Then Ross Vasta re-took the seat for the LNP at the 2010 election. Vasta then remained the MP for Bonner until the 2025 Federal Election where he lost the seat to Labor's Kara Cook.

== Members ==
Image	Member	Party	Term	Notes
	Ross Vasta (1966–)	Liberal	9 October 2004 – 24 November 2007	Lost seat
	Kerry Rea (1963–)	Labor	24 November 2007 – 21 August 2010	Lost seat
	Ross Vasta (1966–)	Liberal (Note: Member of the Liberal National Party of Queensland who sits with the parliamentary Liberal Party.)	21 August 2010 – 3 May 2025	Lost seat
	Kara Cook (1985–)	Labor	3 May 2025 – present	Incumbent

== Election results ==
2025 Australian federal election: Bonner
Party	Candidate	Votes	%	±%
Labor	Kara Cook	39,154	39.51	+9.95
Liberal National	Ross Vasta	35,156	35.47	−9.35
Greens	Wen Li	12,314	12.43	−4.32
One Nation	Christopher de Winter	3,784	3.82	−1.75
Family First	Ross Dovey	2,811	2.84	+2.84
Legalise Cannabis	Craig Hill	2,497	2.52	+2.52
Trumpet of Patriots	David Wright	2,187	2.21	+2.21
Libertarian	Shalini Bhasin	1,203	1.21	+1.21
Total formal votes		99,106	95.57	−1.93
Informal votes		4,597	4.43	+1.93
Turnout		103,703	91.37	+0.80
Two-party-preferred result
Labor	Kara Cook	54,506	55.00	+8.41
Liberal National	Ross Vasta	44,600	45.00	−8.41
Labor gain from Liberal National		Swing	+8.41	
