= Results of the 1992 Queensland state election =

Queensland state election, 19 September 1992 Legislative Assembly << 1989–1995 >>
Enrolled voters	1,951,675				
Votes cast	1,785,403		Turnout	91.48%	+0.30%
Informal votes	40,242		Informal	2.25%	–0.75%
Summary of votes by party
Party	Primary votes	%	Swing	Seats	Change
Labor	850,480	48.73%	–1.59%	54	±0
National	413,772	23.71%	–0.38%	26	–1
Liberal	356,640	20.44%	–0.62%	9	+1
Confederate Action	23,510	1.35%	+1.35%	0	±0
Greens	11,463	0.66%	+0.33%	0	±0
Indigenous Peoples	6,431	0.37%	+0.37%	0	±0
Democrats	5,774	0.33%	–0.09%	0	±0
Independent	77,091	4.42%	+1.20%	0	±0
Total	1,745,161			89	

This is a list of electoral district results for the 1992 Queensland state election.

== Results by electoral district ==
=== Albert ===
1992 Queensland state election: Albert
Party	Candidate	Votes	%	±%
Labor	John Szczerbanik	9,388	48.3	+3.4
National	Paul Flann	5,541	28.5	−0.2
Liberal	David Logan	4,512	23.2	−1.3
Total formal votes		19,441	97.5	
Informal votes		497	2.5	
Turnout		19,938	90.9	
Two-party-preferred result
Labor	John Szczerbanik	9,753	51.6	−8.8
National	Paul Flann	9,132	48.4	+8.8
Labor hold		Swing	−8.8	

=== Archerfield ===
1992 Queensland state election: Archerfield
Party	Candidate	Votes	%	±%
Labor	Len Ardill	12,743	65.2	+1.7
Liberal	Paul Pottinger	6,804	34.8	+9.6
Total formal votes		19,547	96.9	
Informal votes		618	3.1	
Turnout		20,165	92.2	
Labor hold		Swing	+0.9	

=== Ashgrove ===
1992 Queensland state election: Ashgrove
Party	Candidate	Votes	%	±%
Labor	Jim Fouras	11,024	55.5	+2.0
Liberal	Tony Dempsey	5,887	29.6	−6.1
National	Marie McCullagh	2,204	11.1	+3.7
Independent	Ray Sargent	752	3.8	+3.8
Total formal votes		19,867	98.3	
Informal votes		335	1.7	
Turnout		20,202	91.5	
Two-party-preferred result
Labor	Jim Fouras	11,536	59.3	+3.8
Liberal	Tony Dempsey	7,923	40.7	−3.8
Labor hold		Swing	+3.8	

=== Aspley ===
1992 Queensland state election: Aspley
Party	Candidate	Votes	%	±%
Labor	Terry Hampson	9,462	47.6	−1.4
Liberal	John Goss	8,425	42.3	+10.1
National	Mike Sopinski	2,007	10.1	−5.4
Total formal votes		19,894	98.1	
Informal votes		391	1.9	
Turnout		20,285	93.4	
Two-party-preferred result
Liberal	John Goss	10,030	50.9	+2.0
Labor	Terry Hampson	9,663	49.1	−2.0
Liberal hold		Swing	+2.0	

=== Barambah ===
1992 Queensland state election: Barambah
Party	Candidate	Votes	%	±%
National	Trevor Perrett	11,210	54.5	+6.7
Labor	Peter Allen	5,118	24.9	−2.4
Independent	Bob Young	2,568	12.5	+12.5
Liberal	Cliff Casswell	1,667	8.1	−5.5
Total formal votes		20,563	98.1	
Informal votes		389	1.9	
Turnout		20,952	93.6	
Two-party-preferred result
National	Trevor Perrett	13,273	69.4	+2.6
Labor	Peter Allen	5,857	30.6	−2.6
National hold		Swing	+2.6	

=== Barron River ===
1992 Queensland state election: Barron River
Party	Candidate	Votes	%	±%
Labor	Lesley Clark	8,199	44.9	−11.8
National	Ron Crew	4,369	23.9	−6.8
Liberal	Norm Millhouse	3,844	21.1	+9.2
Greens	John Felan	1,400	7.7	+7.7
Independent	Steve Dimitriou	448	2.5	+2.5
Total formal votes		18,260	98.0	
Informal votes		370	2.0	
Turnout		18,630	87.1	
Two-party-preferred result
Labor	Lesley Clark	9,363	54.2	−5.0
National	Ron Crew	7,925	45.8	+5.0
Labor hold		Swing	−5.0	

=== Beaudesert ===
1992 Queensland state election: Beaudesert
Party	Candidate	Votes	%	±%
Labor	Don Petersen	8,544	44.8	+1.2
National	Kev Lingard	7,529	39.5	+11.6
Liberal	John Taylor	2,985	15.7	−7.5
Total formal votes		19,058	97.8	
Informal votes		433	2.2	
Turnout		19,491	92.3	
Two-party-preferred result
National	Kev Lingard	9,964	53.2	+2.2
Labor	Don Petersen	8,759	46.8	−2.2
National hold		Swing	+2.2	

=== Brisbane Central ===
1992 Queensland state election: Brisbane Central
Party	Candidate	Votes	%	±%
Labor	Peter Beattie	10,946	58.7	−2.1
Liberal	Richard Roberts	6,030	32.3	+6.0
Independent	Susan Price	1,680	9.0	+9.0
Total formal votes		18,656	97.5	
Informal votes		477	2.5	
Turnout		19,133	87.3	
Two-party-preferred result
Labor	Peter Beattie	11,869	64.8	+1.9
Liberal	Richard Roberts	6,440	35.2	−1.9
Labor hold		Swing	+1.9	

=== Broadwater ===
1992 Queensland state election: Broadwater
Party	Candidate	Votes	%	±%
Labor	Tom Harrison	7,122	38.3	−3.9
National	Allan Grice	6,224	33.5	+6.7
Liberal	Kay Elson	4,611	24.8	−4.6
Independent	Felix Cernovs	639	3.4	+3.4
Total formal votes		18,596	98.0	
Informal votes		378	2.0	
Turnout		18,974	88.9	
Two-party-preferred result
National	Allan Grice	10,167	56.9	+56.9
Labor	Tom Harrison	7,695	43.1	−2.1
National gain from Liberal		Swing	N/A	

=== Bulimba ===
1992 Queensland state election: Bulimba
Party	Candidate	Votes	%	±%
Labor	Pat Purcell	12,558	62.2	−6.2
Liberal	Alvan Hawkes	4,988	24.7	+4.6
Greens	Barry Wilson	2,646	13.1	+13.1
Total formal votes		20,192	97.3	
Informal votes		549	2.7	
Turnout		20,741	90.5	
Two-party-preferred result
Labor	Pat Purcell	13,673	70.4	+1.2
Liberal	Alvan Hawkes	5,737	29.6	−1.2
Labor hold		Swing	+1.2	

=== Bundaberg ===
1992 Queensland state election: Bundaberg
Party	Candidate	Votes	%	±%
Labor	Clem Campbell	10,597	51.2	−5.4
National	Paul Petrie	6,119	29.6	+0.2
Independent	Tony Barr	1,629	7.9	+7.9
Liberal	Cameron Dale	1,290	6.2	−4.0
Independent	Trevor Versace	1,065	5.1	+5.1
Total formal votes		20,700	98.0	
Informal votes		430	2.0	
Turnout		21,130	93.2	
Two-party-preferred result
Labor	Clem Campbell	11,223	58.7	−0.6
National	Paul Petrie	7,912	41.3	+0.6
Labor hold		Swing	−0.6	

=== Bundamba ===
1992 Queensland state election: Bundamba
Party	Candidate	Votes	%	±%
Labor	Bob Gibbs	13,019	69.8	+1.5
Independent	Hank Schimmel	5,633	30.2	+30.2
Total formal votes		18,652	96.0	
Informal votes		776	4.0	
Turnout		19,428	90.7	
Labor hold		Swing	+1.5	

=== Burdekin ===
1992 Queensland state election: Burdekin
Party	Candidate	Votes	%	±%
Labor	Jenny Hill	9,303	44.6	−1.2
National	Mark Stoneman	8,531	40.9	+5.5
Liberal	Steve Szendrey	3,031	14.5	−4.3
Total formal votes		20,865	98.0	
Informal votes		414	2.0	
Turnout		21,279	92.0	
Two-party-preferred result
National	Mark Stoneman	10,648	52.0	+1.4
Labor	Jenny Hill	9,810	48.0	−1.4
National hold		Swing	+1.4	

=== Burleigh ===
1992 Queensland state election: Burleigh
Party	Candidate	Votes	%	±%
Labor	Pat Stern	8,151	44.6	+1.7
National	Judy Gamin	5,811	31.8	+6.0
Liberal	Lyle Schuntner	3,448	18.9	−8.2
Independent	Antony Bradshaw	871	4.8	+4.8
Total formal votes		18,281	97.9	
Informal votes		393	2.1	
Turnout		18,674	89.2	
Two-party-preferred result
National	Judy Gamin	9,006	51.1	+51.1
Labor	Pat Stern	8,624	48.9	+2.5
National gain from Liberal		Swing	N/A	

=== Burnett ===
1992 Queensland state election: Burnett
Party	Candidate	Votes	%	±%
National	Doug Slack	9,776	46.1	+6.4
Labor	Michael Klein	7,479	35.2	−3.1
Independent	Maurice Chapman	2,047	9.6	−1.8
Confederate Action	Bill May	1,927	9.1	+9.1
Total formal votes		21,229	97.9	
Informal votes		450	2.1	
Turnout		21,679	92.2	
Two-party-preferred result
National	Doug Slack	12,113	59.5	+2.7
Labor	Michael Klein	8,247	40.5	−2.7
National hold		Swing	+2.7	

=== Caboolture ===
1992 Queensland state election: Caboolture
Party	Candidate	Votes	%	±%
Labor	Jon Sullivan	10,736	51.9	+1.0
National	Bill Newton	4,730	22.8	−0.8
Liberal	Joy Leishman	4,273	20.6	+0.7
Independent	Dave Groves	964	4.7	+4.7
Total formal votes		20,703	98.0	
Informal votes		415	2.0	
Turnout		21,118	93.9	
Two-party-preferred result
Labor	Jon Sullivan	11,244	57.9	+2.7
National	Bill Newton	8,177	42.1	−2.7
Labor hold		Swing	+2.7	

=== Cairns ===
1992 Queensland state election: Cairns
Party	Candidate	Votes	%	±%
Labor	Keith De Lacy	9,273	53.0	−8.4
Liberal	Kel Ryan	4,246	24.3	+22.4
National	Ron Balodis	2,511	14.3	−22.4
Greens	Jonathan Metcalfe	1,476	8.4	+8.4
Total formal votes		17,506	97.8	
Informal votes		388	2.2	
Turnout		17,894	84.8	
Two-party-preferred result
Labor	Keith De Lacy	10,062	61.1	−0.6
Liberal	Kel Ryan	6,395	38.9	+38.9
Labor hold		Swing	−0.6	

=== Callide ===
1992 Queensland state election: Callide
Party	Candidate	Votes	%	±%
National	Di McCauley	11,927	65.6	+7.0
Independent	Tom Knight	3,340	18.4	+18.4
Confederate Action	Anthony May	2,904	16.0	+16.0
Total formal votes		18,171	98.1	
Informal votes		359	1.9	
Turnout		18,530	93.8	
Two-candidate-preferred result
National	Di McCauley	13,150	75.9	+8.9
Independent	Tom Knight	4,172	24.1	+24.1
National hold		Swing	+8.9	

=== Caloundra ===
1992 Queensland state election: Caloundra
Party	Candidate	Votes	%	±%
Labor	Joe Hannan	8,404	44.4	+4.4
Liberal	Joan Sheldon	6,536	34.6	+18.5
National	Liz Bell	3,973	21.0	−19.5
Total formal votes		18,913	97.5	
Informal votes		489	2.5	
Turnout		19,402	92.6	
Two-party-preferred result
Liberal	Joan Sheldon	9,668	52.3	+52.3
Labor	Joe Hannan	8,810	47.7	+3.9
Liberal gain from National		Swing	N/A	

=== Capalaba ===
1992 Queensland state election: Capalaba
Party	Candidate	Votes	%	±%
Labor	Jim Elder	11,728	64.7	+7.5
Liberal	Bill Vaughan	6,408	35.3	+18.1
Total formal votes		18,136	97.2	
Informal votes		522	2.8	
Turnout		18,658	92.3	
Labor hold		Swing	+1.1	

=== Charters Towers ===
1992 Queensland state election: Charters Towers
Party	Candidate	Votes	%	±%
Labor	Ken Smyth	7,475	45.7	−3.0
National	Rob Mitchell	7,209	44.1	+0.3
Independent	Jo Cronin	901	5.5	+5.5
Liberal	Joseph Kirk	526	3.2	+1.0
Independent	Harrison Duncan	229	1.4	+1.4
Total formal votes		16,340	98.0	
Informal votes		326	2.0	
Turnout		16,666	92.2	
Two-party-preferred result
National	Rob Mitchell	7,966	50.4	+2.0
Labor	Ken Smyth	7,853	49.6	−2.0
National gain from Labor		Swing	+2.0	

=== Chatsworth ===
1992 Queensland state election: Chatsworth
Party	Candidate	Votes	%	±%
Labor	Terry Mackenroth	11,593	55.0	−6.4
Liberal	Brett Blade	4,958	23.5	−3.7
National	David Stone	3,046	14.4	+3.4
Greens	Lou Gugenberger	1,498	7.1	+7.1
Total formal votes		21,095	97.8	
Informal votes		469	2.2	
Turnout		21,564	93.0	
Two-party-preferred result
Labor	Terry Mackenroth	12,371	61.1	−1.3
Liberal	Brett Blade	7,862	38.9	+1.3
Labor hold		Swing	−1.3	

=== Chermside ===
1992 Queensland state election: Chermside
Party	Candidate	Votes	%	±%
Labor	Terry Sullivan	11,799	59.7	+5.3
Liberal	Keith Schafferius	5,221	26.4	−5.0
National	Doug Foggo	2,734	13.8	+2.9
Total formal votes		19,754	98.0	
Informal votes		401	2.0	
Turnout		20,155	93.2	
Two-party-preferred result
Labor	Terry Sullivan	12,050	61.7	+5.0
Liberal	Keith Schafferius	7,479	38.3	−5.0
Labor hold		Swing	+5.0	

=== Clayfield ===
1992 Queensland state election: Clayfield
Party	Candidate	Votes	%	±%
Liberal	Santo Santoro	10,178	51.1	+11.1
Labor	Dennis Williams	8,609	43.2	−5.9
Independent	Peter Dove	565	2.8	+2.8
Indigenous Peoples	Darby McCarthy	561	2.8	+2.8
Total formal votes		19,913	98.0	
Informal votes		395	2.0	
Turnout		20,308	91.1	
Two-party-preferred result
Liberal	Santo Santoro	10,602	54.1	+4.1
Labor	Dennis Williams	9,004	45.9	−4.1
Liberal hold		Swing	+4.1	

=== Cleveland ===
1992 Queensland state election: Cleveland
Party	Candidate	Votes	%	±%
Labor	Darryl Briskey	10,358	55.2	+2.6
Liberal	Eddie Santagiuliana	5,055	26.9	+8.2
National	Paul Asher	3,360	17.9	−3.8
Total formal votes		18,773	97.6	
Informal votes		453	2.4	
Turnout		19,226	92.5	
Two-party-preferred result
Labor	Darryl Briskey	10,639	57.5	−2.7
Liberal	Eddie Santagiuliana	7,874	42.5	+42.5
Labor hold		Swing	−2.7	

=== Cook ===
1992 Queensland state election: Cook
Party	Candidate	Votes	%	±%
Labor	Steve Bredhauer	6,794	49.0	+2.8
National	John Weightman	3,465	25.0	−1.1
Liberal	David Spanagel	1,321	9.5	+1.4
Independent	David Byrne	1,000	7.2	−0.1
Independent	George Villaflor	586	4.2	+4.2
Indigenous Peoples	Merv Gibson	373	2.7	+2.7
Indigenous Peoples	Norman Johnson	180	1.3	+1.3
Independent	Anton Castro	141	1.0	+1.0
Total formal votes		13,860	97.6	
Informal votes		343	2.4	
Turnout		14,203	85.8	
Two-party-preferred result
Labor	Steve Bredhauer	7,883	62.2	+4.1
National	John Weightman	4,794	37.8	−4.1
Labor hold		Swing	+4.1	

=== Crows Nest ===
1992 Queensland state election: Crows Nest
Party	Candidate	Votes	%	±%
National	Russell Cooper	11,162	51.1	+11.9
Labor	Ross Spencer	5,740	28.3	+1.2
Liberal	Neville Stuart	3,352	16.5	−6.4
Total formal votes		20,254	97.7	
Informal votes		484	2.3	
Turnout		20,738	93.2	
Two-party-preferred result
National	Russell Cooper	13,483	68.6	+2.9
Labor	Ross Spencer	6,178	31.4	−2.9
National hold		Swing	+2.9	

=== Cunningham ===
1992 Queensland state election: Cunningham
Party	Candidate	Votes	%	±%
National	Tony Elliott	12,173	57.3	+10.2
Labor	David Cooper	6,778	31.9	+3.1
Liberal	Ted Radke	2,291	10.8	−9.8
Total formal votes		21,242	97.9	
Informal votes		459	2.1	
Turnout		21,701	92.2	
Two-party-preferred result
National	Tony Elliott	13,888	66.4	+1.0
Labor	David Cooper	7,036	33.6	−1.0
National hold		Swing	+1.0	

=== Currumbin ===
1992 Queensland state election: Currumbin
Party	Candidate	Votes	%	±%
Labor	Merri Rose	8,934	47.6	+2.4
Liberal	Andrew Schuller	4,462	23.8	−5.6
National	Bob Hancock	3,523	18.8	−1.7
Greens	Brad Farmer	1,845	9.8	+9.8
Total formal votes		18,764	98.2	
Informal votes		347	1.8	
Turnout		19,111	88.9	
Two-party-preferred result
Labor	Merri Rose	9,961	55.8	+5.9
Liberal	Andrew Schuller	7,888	44.2	−5.9
Labor gain from Liberal		Swing	+5.9	

=== Everton ===
1992 Queensland state election: Everton
Party	Candidate	Votes	%	±%
Labor	Rod Welford	12,185	59.6	+2.7
Liberal	Bryan Carpenter	5,277	25.8	−5.7
National	John Jurss	2,999	14.7	+5.2
Total formal votes		20,461	97.6	
Informal votes		495	2.4	
Turnout		20,956	93.1	
Two-party-preferred result
Labor	Rod Welford	12,445	61.7	+3.3
Liberal	Bryan Carpenter	7,736	38.3	−3.3
Labor hold		Swing	+3.3	

=== Ferny Grove ===
1992 Queensland state election: Ferny Grove
Party	Candidate	Votes	%	±%
Labor	Glen Milliner	12,009	57.6	−1.3
Liberal	Rex Hawkes	3,752	18.0	−12.3
National	Chris Harding	3,504	16.8	+7.8
Independent	Des O'Neill	1,567	7.5	+7.5
Total formal votes		20,832	98.0	
Informal votes		430	2.0	
Turnout		21,262	93.8	
Two-party-preferred result
Labor	Glen Milliner	12,805	63.8	+3.6
Liberal	Rex Hawkes	7,253	36.2	−3.6
Labor hold		Swing	+3.6	

=== Fitzroy ===
1992 Queensland state election: Fitzroy
Party	Candidate	Votes	%	±%
Labor	Jim Pearce	11,551	56.7	−0.1
National	Marie Mahood	5,450	26.7	−9.3
Liberal	Dick Phillips	1,731	8.5	+7.6
Independent	Keith Scantlebury	1,646	8.1	+8.1
Total formal votes		20,378	98.4	
Informal votes		329	1.6	
Turnout		20,707	91.9	
Two-party-preferred result
Labor	Jim Pearce	12,092	62.0	+2.5
National	Marie Mahood	7,412	38.0	−2.5
Labor hold		Swing	+2.5	

=== Gladstone ===
1992 Queensland state election: Gladstone
Party	Candidate	Votes	%	±%
Labor	Neil Bennett	10,114	48.9	−11.5
Independent	Liz Cunningham	6,531	31.6	+31.6
National	Jenny Elliot	2,995	14.5	−12.6
Liberal	Maree Petty	1,044	5.0	+5.0
Total formal votes		20,684	98.1	
Informal votes		408	1.9	
Turnout		21,092	93.0	
Two-candidate-preferred result
Labor	Neil Bennett	10,469	52.0	−12.3
Independent	Liz Cunningham	9,668	48.0	+48.0
Labor hold		Swing	−12.3	

=== Greenslopes ===
1992 Queensland state election: Greenslopes
Party	Candidate	Votes	%	±%
Labor	Gary Fenlon	10,639	53.0	−0.8
Liberal	Graham Young	7,888	39.3	+9.8
Greens	Simon Bliss	1,121	5.6	+5.6
Independent	Stephen Heather	424	2.1	+2.1
Total formal votes		20,072	98.0	
Informal votes		418	2.0	
Turnout		20,490	92.4	
Two-party-preferred result
Labor	Gary Fenlon	11,277	57.2	+1.0
Liberal	Graham Young	8,425	42.8	−1.0
Labor hold		Swing	+1.0	

=== Gregory ===
1992 Queensland state election: Gregory
Party	Candidate	Votes	%	±%
National	Vaughan Johnson	8,429	60.2	+9.6
Labor	Colleen Dobson	5,565	39.8	−0.7
Total formal votes		13,994	98.3	
Informal votes		247	1.7	
Turnout		14,241	91.8	
National hold		Swing	+2.8	

=== Gympie ===
1992 Queensland state election: Gympie
Party	Candidate	Votes	%	±%
National	Len Stephan	7,921	40.0	+6.9
Labor	Geoffrey Brown	7,026	35.5	−1.6
Independent	Bruce Chapman	2,589	13.1	+6.5
Liberal	John Cotter	2,256	11.4	+2.3
Total formal votes		19,792	98.4	
Informal votes		315	1.6	
Turnout		20,107	92.9	
Two-party-preferred result
National	Len Stephan	10,873	57.6	+1.8
Labor	Geoffrey Brown	7,993	42.4	−1.8
National hold		Swing	+1.8	

=== Hervey Bay ===
1992 Queensland state election: Hervey Bay
Party	Candidate	Votes	%	±%
Labor	Bill Nunn	9,345	49.0	+4.0
National	Tony Nioa	7,580	39.7	+20.6
Liberal	Doug Wickham	2,159	11.3	−7.6
Total formal votes		19,084	98.1	
Informal votes		371	1.9	
Turnout		19,455	92.5	
Two-party-preferred result
Labor	Bill Nunn	9,519	50.6	−0.3
National	Tony Nioa	9,289	49.4	+0.3
Labor hold		Swing	−0.3	

=== Hinchinbrook ===
1992 Queensland state election: Hinchinbrook
Party	Candidate	Votes	%	±%
National	Marc Rowell	10,957	52.3	+18.1
Labor	Bill Eaton	10,008	47.7	−1.0
Total formal votes		20,965	98.0	
Informal votes		422	2.0	
Turnout		21,387	92.9	
National hold		Swing	+5.3	

=== Inala ===
1992 Queensland state election: Inala
Party	Candidate	Votes	%	±%
Labor	Henry Palaszczuk	14,070	72.2	−0.6
Liberal	Charles Perry	3,586	18.4	−4.2
Indigenous Peoples	Norma James	1,835	9.4	+9.4
Total formal votes		19,491	96.9	
Informal votes		630	3.1	
Turnout		20,121	91.0	
Two-party-preferred result
Labor	Henry Palaszczuk	14,546	76.4	+3.2
Liberal	Charles Perry	4,486	23.6	−3.2
Labor hold		Swing	+3.2	

=== Indooroopilly ===
1992 Queensland state election: Indooroopilly
Party	Candidate	Votes	%	±%
Liberal	Denver Beanland	11,633	56.4	+13.4
Labor	Harold Thornton	8,999	43.6	−1.7
Total formal votes		20,632	97.9	
Informal votes		439	2.1	
Turnout		21,071	90.3	
Liberal hold		Swing	+4.4	

=== Ipswich ===
1992 Queensland state election: Ipswich
Party	Candidate	Votes	%	±%
Labor	David Hamill	12,876	61.2	−3.9
National	Bob Pollock	3,431	16.3	+15.9
Liberal	Shane Moon	2,815	13.4	−17.2
Indigenous Peoples	Kenny Dalton	1,237	5.9	+5.9
National	John Coyle	677	3.2	+3.2
Total formal votes		21,036	97.2	
Informal votes		606	2.8	
Turnout		21,642	93.0	
Two-party-preferred result
Labor	David Hamill	13,505	67.8	+1.5
National	Bob Pollock	6,421	32.2	+32.2
Labor hold		Swing	+1.5	

=== Ipswich West ===
1992 Queensland state election: Ipswich West
Party	Candidate	Votes	%	±%
Labor	Don Livingstone	12,497	59.1	+1.2
National	Jack Else	4,958	23.4	+18.3
Liberal	Pat Moore	3,696	17.5	−17.5
Total formal votes		21,151	97.1	
Informal votes		633	2.9	
Turnout		21,784	93.1	
Two-party-preferred result
Labor	Don Livingstone	12,882	62.7	+3.8
National	Jack Else	7,676	37.3	+37.3
Labor hold		Swing	+3.8	

=== Kallangur ===
1992 Queensland state election: Kallangur
Party	Candidate	Votes	%	±%
Labor	Ken Hayward	13,266	62.1	+5.9
Liberal	Col Cruden	8,092	37.9	+17.5
Total formal votes		21,358	96.8	
Informal votes		700	3.2	
Turnout		22,058	92.2	
Labor hold		Swing	+2.5	

=== Kedron ===
1992 Queensland state election: Kedron
Party	Candidate	Votes	%	±%
Labor	Pat Comben	11,139	59.1	−1.7
Liberal	Chris Buck	3,660	19.4	−7.6
National	Andrew Hassall	1,951	10.3	−0.3
Independent	Don Armstrong	1,073	5.7	+5.7
Greens	Richard Nielsen	1,029	5.5	+5.5
Total formal votes		18,852	97.7	
Informal votes		435	2.3	
Turnout		19,287	91.5	
Two-party-preferred result
Labor	Pat Comben	11,978	66.3	+3.9
Liberal	Chris Buck	6,102	33.7	−3.9
Labor hold		Swing	+3.9	

=== Keppel ===
1992 Queensland state election: Keppel
Party	Candidate	Votes	%	±%
Labor	Rob Schwarten	9,212	41.5	−6.1
National	Vince Lester	8,831	39.8	+3.8
Democrats	Glenmary Swan	1,424	6.4	+6.4
Liberal	Kim Shields	1,100	5.0	−3.2
Confederate Action	Leo Black	1,091	4.9	+4.9
Independent	Chris Hooper	517	2.3	+2.3
Total formal votes		22,175	98.3	
Informal votes		386	1.7	
Turnout		22,561	93.4	
Two-party-preferred result
National	Vince Lester	10,763	51.4	+4.7
Labor	Rob Schwarten	10,171	48.6	−4.7
National gain from Labor		Swing	+4.7	

=== Kurwongbah ===
1992 Queensland state election: Kurwongbah
Party	Candidate	Votes	%	±%
Labor	Margaret Woodgate	11,750	57.2	+0.1
Liberal	Graeme Ashworth	4,075	19.8	−2.9
National	Bruce Stewart	3,092	15.0	−1.9
Independent	Dennis Sharkey	1,634	8.0	+8.0
Total formal votes		20,551	97.9	
Informal votes		433	2.1	
Turnout		20,984	93.8	
Two-party-preferred result
Labor	Margaret Woodgate	12,488	63.1	+3.8
Liberal	Graeme Ashworth	7,315	36.9	−3.8
Labor hold		Swing	+3.8	

=== Lockyer ===
1992 Queensland state election: Lockyer
Party	Candidate	Votes	%	±%
National	Tony Fitzgerald	10,757	50.1	+4.4
Labor	Lyn Kally	6,353	29.6	−0.3
Confederate Action	Geoff Abnett	2,450	11.4	+11.4
Liberal	Robert Lucas	1,902	8.9	−6.4
Total formal votes		21,462	98.3	
Informal votes		375	1.7	
Turnout		21,837	93.9	
Two-party-preferred result
National	Tony Fitzgerald	13,163	65.1	+1.4
Labor	Lyn Kally	7,060	34.9	−1.4
National hold		Swing	+1.4	

=== Logan ===
1992 Queensland state election: Logan
Party	Candidate	Votes	%	±%
Labor	Wayne Goss	14,467	69.1	+2.6
National	Gordon Ritter	2,751	13.1	+0.6
Liberal	Susie Gilbert	2,316	11.1	−9.1
Independent	Russell Leneham	1,413	6.7	+6.7
Total formal votes		20,947	97.2	
Informal votes		611	2.8	
Turnout		21,558	91.6	
Two-party-preferred result
Labor	Wayne Goss	15,206	75.3	+7.6
National	Gordon Ritter	4,978	24.7	+24.7
Labor hold		Swing	+7.6	

=== Lytton ===
1992 Queensland state election: Lytton
Party	Candidate	Votes	%	±%
Labor	Tom Burns	14,465	69.8	+1.6
Liberal	Tom McKaskill	6,248	30.2	+13.6
Total formal votes		20,713	97.7	
Informal votes		499	2.3	
Turnout		21,212	93.7	
Labor hold		Swing	−0.7	

=== Mackay ===
1992 Queensland state election: Mackay
Party	Candidate	Votes	%	±%
Labor	Ed Casey	11,276	55.0	−2.0
National	Eric Ross	4,778	23.3	−4.6
Confederate Action	Sandra Hill	2,831	13.8	+13.8
Liberal	David Hamilton	1,617	7.9	−3.4
Total formal votes		20,502	98.0	
Informal votes		410	2.0	
Turnout		20,912	90.1	
Two-party-preferred result
Labor	Ed Casey	12,194	64.2	+3.9
National	Eric Ross	6,799	35.8	−3.9
Labor hold		Swing	+3.9	

=== Mansfield ===
1992 Queensland state election: Mansfield
Party	Candidate	Votes	%	±%
Labor	Laurel Power	10,888	50.5	+3.2
Liberal	Don Cameron	7,851	36.4	+13.0
National	Glenys Head	2,823	13.1	−15.9
Total formal votes		21,562	98.0	
Informal votes		437	2.0	
Turnout		21,999	92.9	
Two-party-preferred result
Labor	Laurel Power	11,197	52.6	+0.3
Liberal	Don Cameron	10,108	47.4	+47.4
Labor hold		Swing	+0.3	

=== Maroochydore ===
1992 Queensland state election: Maroochydore
Party	Candidate	Votes	%	±%
Labor	Alison Jackson	7,658	39.7	−2.6
National	Fiona Simpson	6,185	32.0	+8.1
Liberal	Leslie Treichel	3,995	20.7	−1.8
Independent	Ian McNiven	1,463	7.6	+7.6
Total formal votes		19,301	97.6	
Informal votes		475	2.4	
Turnout		19,776	90.3	
Two-party-preferred result
National	Fiona Simpson	9,582	54.0	+54.0
Labor	Alison Jackson	8,157	46.0	+0.1
National gain from Liberal		Swing	N/A	

=== Maryborough ===
1992 Queensland state election: Maryborough
Party	Candidate	Votes	%	±%
Labor	Bob Dollin	9,402	49.0	0.0
National	Gilbert Alison	6,674	34.8	−4.7
Confederate Action	Tony Pitt	3,103	16.2	+16.2
Total formal votes		19,179	98.3	
Informal votes		324	1.7	
Turnout		19,503	94.6	
Two-party-preferred result
Labor	Bob Dollin	9,919	53.3	+1.9
National	Gilbert Alison	8,691	46.7	−1.9
Labor hold		Swing	+1.9	

=== Merrimac ===
1992 Queensland state election: Merrimac
Party	Candidate	Votes	%	±%
Labor	Mark Whillans	6,605	35.6	+1.0
Liberal	Bob Quinn	6,143	33.1	+0.9
National	Les Mole	4,953	26.7	−2.7
Confederate Action	Colin Smith	851	4.6	+4.6
Total formal votes		18,552	98.0	
Informal votes		380	2.0	
Turnout		18,932	87.8	
Two-party-preferred result
Liberal	Bob Quinn	10,656	60.5	−1.6
Labor	Mark Whillans	6,945	39.5	+1.6
Liberal hold		Swing	−1.6	

=== Mirani ===
1992 Queensland state election: Mirani
Party	Candidate	Votes	%	±%
National	Jim Randell	9,135	43.3	+2.1
Labor	Michael Scriha	8,411	39.9	−5.2
Confederate Action	Trevor Howland	2,896	13.7	+13.7
Liberal	Alf Maher	640	3.0	−8.6
Total formal votes		21,082	98.6	
Informal votes		300	1.4	
Turnout		21,382	92.3	
Two-party-preferred result
National	Jim Randell	10,749	54.3	+2.4
Labor	Michael Scriha	9,035	45.7	−2.4
National hold		Swing	+2.4	

==== By-election ====
- This by-election was caused by the resignation of Jim Randell. It was held on 30 April 1994.

1994 Mirani state by-election
Party	Candidate	Votes	%	±%
National	Ted Malone	10,295	52.0	+8.7
Labor	Graeme Hall	7,881	39.8	−0.1
Confederate Action	Arthur Jackson	1,635	8.2	−5.5
Total formal votes		19,811	98.8	+0.2
Informal votes		247	1.2	−0.2
Turnout		20,058	83.7	−8.6
Two-party-preferred result
National	Ted Malone	11,114	57.2	+2.9
Labor	Graeme Hall	8,324	42.8	−2.9
National hold		Swing	+2.9	

=== Moggill ===
1992 Queensland state election: Moggill
Party	Candidate	Votes	%	±%
Liberal	David Watson	9,389	46.4	+3.3
Labor	Laurie Lumsden	7,606	37.6	−3.2
National	Trevor St Baker	2,352	11.6	+0.4
Independent	Geoff Wilson	905	4.5	+4.5
Total formal votes		20,252	98.6	
Informal votes		294	1.4	
Turnout		20,546	91.9	
Two-party-preferred result
Liberal	David Watson	11,694	59.1	+3.6
Labor	Laurie Lumsden	8,101	40.9	−3.6
Liberal hold		Swing	+3.6	

=== Mooloolah ===
1992 Queensland state election: Mooloolah
Party	Candidate	Votes	%	±%
Liberal	Bruce Laming	6,651	34.3	+11.9
Labor	Scott Zackeresen	6,172	31.8	−5.4
National	Kevin Asmus	5,115	26.4	−7.0
Independent	Santo Ferraro	1,456	7.5	+7.5
Total formal votes		19,394	98.0	
Informal votes		405	2.0	
Turnout		19,799	91.2	
Two-party-preferred result
Liberal	Bruce Laming	11,660	62.9	+62.9
Labor	Scott Zackeresen	6,883	37.1	−6.4
Liberal gain from National		Swing	N/A	

=== Mount Coot-tha ===
1992 Queensland state election: Mount Coot-tha
Party	Candidate	Votes	%	±%
Labor	Wendy Edmond	11,646	56.0	−0.7
Liberal	Andrew McBryde	5,321	25.6	−5.1
National	Don Caslick	2,243	10.8	+2.2
Democrats	Kerri Kellett	1,587	7.6	+7.6
Total formal votes		20,797	98.2	
Informal votes		389	1.8	
Turnout		21,186	88.8	
Two-party-preferred result
Labor	Wendy Edmond	12,546	62.4	+2.7
Liberal	Andrew McBryde	7,567	37.6	−2.7
Labor hold		Swing	+2.7	

=== Mount Gravatt ===
1992 Queensland state election: Mount Gravatt
Party	Candidate	Votes	%	±%
Labor	Judy Spence	11,211	56.4	+1.9
Liberal	Allan Pidgeon	7,563	38.1	+9.7
Independent	David McBryde	1,092	5.5	+5.5
Total formal votes		19,866	98.0	
Informal votes		402	2.0	
Turnout		20,268	92.5	
Two-party-preferred result
Labor	Judy Spence	11,582	59.2	+3.4
Liberal	Allan Pidgeon	7,991	40.8	−3.4
Labor hold		Swing	+3.4	

=== Mount Isa ===
1992 Queensland state election: Mount Isa
Party	Candidate	Votes	%	±%
Labor	Tony McGrady	9,068	61.4	+4.8
National	Jeff Daniels	3,087	20.9	+8.6
Liberal	Glen Brown	1,817	12.3	−15.6
Confederate Action	Bill Petrie	484	3.3	+3.3
Indigenous Peoples	Jacob George	315	2.1	+2.1
Total formal votes		14,771	97.9	
Informal votes		323	2.1	
Turnout		15,094	86.7	
Two-party-preferred result
Labor	Tony McGrady	9,487	67.6	+9.0
National	Jeff Daniels	4,550	32.4	+32.4
Labor hold		Swing	+9.0	

=== Mount Ommaney ===
1992 Queensland state election: Mount Ommaney
Party	Candidate	Votes	%	±%
Labor	Peter Pyke	10,386	51.2	+4.9
Liberal	David Dunworth	9,880	48.8	−4.9
Total formal votes		20,266	97.8	
Informal votes		448	2.2	
Turnout		20,714	92.2	
Labor gain from Liberal		Swing	+4.9	

=== Mulgrave ===
1992 Queensland state election: Mulgrave
Party	Candidate	Votes	%	±%
Labor	Warren Pitt	8,666	48.2	−7.3
National	John Rossi	5,388	30.0	−13.0
Independent	Max Menzel	2,230	12.4	+12.4
Liberal	Scott Sturgess	1,703	9.5	+9.5
Total formal votes		17,987	98.0	
Informal votes		365	2.0	
Turnout		18,352	90.5	
Two-party-preferred result
Labor	Warren Pitt	9,256	53.2	−2.8
National	John Rossi	8,153	46.8	+2.8
Labor hold		Swing	−2.8	

=== Mundingburra ===
1992 Queensland state election: Mundingburra
Party	Candidate	Votes	%	±%
Labor	Ken Davies	11,125	53.1	−0.6
Liberal	Jim Cathcart	5,042	24.1	+6.2
National	Reg Fenton	3,335	15.9	−10.6
Democrats	Colin Parker	1,439	6.9	+6.9
Total formal votes		20,941	97.1	
Informal votes		622	2.9	
Turnout		21,563	89.9	
Two-party-preferred result
Labor	Ken Davies	11,753	59.4	+1.7
Liberal	Jim Cathcart	8,033	40.6	+40.6
Labor hold		Swing	+1.7	

=== Murrumba ===
1992 Queensland state election: Murrumba
Party	Candidate	Votes	%	±%
Labor	Dean Wells	12,187	63.1	+1.6
Liberal	Fran Jones	5,695	29.5	+6.4
Independent	Kevin Hendstock	1,421	7.4	+4.3
Total formal votes		19,303	97.0	
Informal votes		589	3.0	
Turnout		19,892	92.7	
Two-party-preferred result
Labor	Dean Wells	12,512	66.3	+3.0
Liberal	Fran Jones	6,364	33.7	−3.0
Labor hold		Swing	+3.0	

=== Nerang ===
1992 Queensland state election: Nerang
Party	Candidate	Votes	%	±%
Labor	Tony Carman	7,883	40.1	−0.1
Liberal	Ray Connor	6,096	31.0	+1.7
National	Iona Abrahamson	4,828	24.6	−2.6
Independent	Chris Ivory	836	4.3	+4.3
Total formal votes		19,643	97.6	
Informal votes		484	2.4	
Turnout		20,127	89.9	
Two-party-preferred result
Liberal	Ray Connor	10,274	54.8	−1.8
Labor	Tony Carman	8,462	45.2	+1.8
Liberal hold		Swing	−1.8	

=== Nicklin ===
1992 Queensland state election: Nicklin
Party	Candidate	Votes	%	±%
Labor	Coleen Giles	6,011	28.1	−10.8
National	Neil Turner	5,904	27.6	−0.8
Liberal	Bob King	4,742	22.2	+1.6
Independent	Hermann Schwabe	4,734	22.1	+22.1
Total formal votes		21,391	98.2	
Informal votes		396	1.8	
Turnout		21,787	91.4	
Two-party-preferred result
National	Neil Turner	11,217	57.9	+3.9
Labor	Coleen Giles	8,163	42.1	−3.9
National hold		Swing	+3.9	

=== Noosa ===
1992 Queensland state election: Noosa
Party	Candidate	Votes	%	±%
Labor	Ray Barber	8,896	46.2	−3.4
Liberal	Bruce Davidson	7,509	39.0	+15.6
National	Barbara Luff	2,848	14.8	−6.0
Total formal votes		19,253	98.2	
Informal votes		360	1.8	
Turnout		19,613	89.6	
Two-party-preferred result
Liberal	Bruce Davidson	9,984	52.5	+4.9
Labor	Ray Barber	9,047	47.5	−4.9
Liberal gain from Labor		Swing	+4.9	

=== Nudgee ===
1992 Queensland state election: Nudgee
Party	Candidate	Votes	%	±%
Labor	Ken Vaughan	14,359	68.7	+3.2
Liberal	Max Shadlow	6,539	31.3	+7.3
Total formal votes		20,898	96.9	
Informal votes		673	3.1	
Turnout		21,571	93.4	
Labor hold		Swing	+2.5	

=== Redcliffe ===
1992 Queensland state election: Redcliffe
Party	Candidate	Votes	%	±%
Labor	Ray Hollis	10,537	53.5	+2.8
Liberal	Allan Sutherland	5,366	27.2	−13.4
National	Alan Boulton	2,464	12.5	+6.5
Independent	Steven Griffith	1,327	6.7	+6.7
Total formal votes		19,694	97.1	−0.6
Informal votes		578	2.9	+0.6
Turnout		20,272	92.1	+0.3
Two-party-preferred result
Labor	Ray Hollis	11,113	58.6	+6.6
Liberal	Allan Sutherland	7,867	41.4	−6.6
Labor hold		Swing	+6.6	

=== Redlands ===
1992 Queensland state election: Redlands
Party	Candidate	Votes	%	±%
Labor	John Budd	9,909	49.8	+1.0
National	Paul Clauson	5,596	28.1	+3.5
Liberal	Mike Jones	3,240	16.3	−5.3
Independent	Rick Pisera	611	3.1	+3.1
Independent	Charles Connelly	556	2.8	+2.8
Total formal votes		19,912	97.6	
Informal votes		491	2.4	
Turnout		20,403	92.2	
Two-party-preferred result
Labor	John Budd	10,622	55.2	−0.8
National	Paul Clauson	8,604	44.8	+0.8
Labor hold		Swing	−0.8	

=== Rockhampton ===
1992 Queensland state election: Rockhampton
Party	Candidate	Votes	%	±%
Labor	Paul Braddy	11,866	56.9	−3.5
National	Ron Bahnisch	5,566	26.7	−5.2
Liberal	John Fillod	1,139	5.5	+0.5
Independent	Ross Allan	941	4.5	+4.5
Greens	Peter George	842	4.0	+4.0
Independent	Peter Boyle	511	2.5	+2.5
Total formal votes		20,865	97.3	
Informal votes		569	2.7	
Turnout		21,434	93.1	
Two-party-preferred result
Labor	Paul Braddy	12,485	63.1	+1.1
National	Ron Bahnisch	7,307	36.9	−1.1
Labor hold		Swing	+1.1	

=== Sandgate ===
1992 Queensland state election: Sandgate
Party	Candidate	Votes	%	±%
Labor	Gordon Nuttall	13,572	66.4	−0.5
Liberal	Rob Dixon	6,858	33.6	+11.7
Total formal votes		20,430	97.0	
Informal votes		620	3.0	
Turnout		21,050	93.1	
Labor hold		Swing	−1.3	

=== South Brisbane ===
1992 Queensland state election: South Brisbane
Party	Candidate	Votes	%	±%
Labor	Anne Warner	11,970	61.2	+3.3
Liberal	Mark Bromback	5,389	27.5	+7.0
Indigenous Peoples	Netta Tyson	1,247	6.4	+6.4
Democrats	Andrew Bartlett	963	4.9	+4.9
Total formal votes		19,569	96.6	
Informal votes		691	3.4	
Turnout		20,260	86.6	
Two-party-preferred result
Labor	Anne Warner	13,020	68.5	+3.0
Liberal	Mark Bromback	5,989	31.5	−3.0
Labor hold		Swing	+3.0	

=== Southport ===
1992 Queensland state election: Southport
Party	Candidate	Votes	%	±%
Labor	Peter Lawlor	8,381	41.8	+0.6
National	Mick Veivers	5,756	28.7	+1.5
Liberal	Tim Baker	5,017	25.0	−2.0
Independent	Gary Wachter	876	4.4	+4.4
Total formal votes		20,030	97.9	
Informal votes		429	2.1	
Turnout		20,459	90.4	
Two-party-preferred result
National	Mick Veivers	10,038	52.3	−1.0
Labor	Peter Lawlor	9,145	47.7	+1.0
National hold		Swing	−1.0	

=== Springwood ===
1992 Queensland state election: Springwood
Party	Candidate	Votes	%	±%
Labor	Molly Robson	9,822	53.2	+2.9
Liberal	Kym James	3,802	20.6	−2.3
National	John Hegarty	3,507	19.0	−3.8
Independent	Allan de Brenni	1,318	7.1	+7.1
Total formal votes		18,449	98.0	
Informal votes		380	2.0	
Turnout		18,829	92.4	
Two-party-preferred result
Labor	Molly Robson	10,406	58.7	+5.6
National	John Hegarty	7,333	41.3	+41.3
Labor hold		Swing	+5.6	

=== Sunnybank ===
1992 Queensland state election: Sunnybank
Party	Candidate	Votes	%	±%
Labor	Stephen Robertson	11,139	52.1	−0.8
Liberal	Gary Hardgrave	6,255	29.2	−2.3
National	Alan Hales	2,902	13.6	−2.0
Independent	Vivienne Rohrlach	1,099	5.1	+5.1
Total formal votes		21,395	97.9	
Informal votes		449	2.1	
Turnout		21,844	92.7	
Two-party-preferred result
Labor	Stephen Robertson	11,622	55.5	+1.5
Liberal	Gary Hardgrave	9,306	44.5	−1.5
Labor hold		Swing	+1.5	

=== Surfers Paradise ===
1992 Queensland state election: Surfers Paradise
Party	Candidate	Votes	%	±%
National	Rob Borbidge	7,983	45.2	+11.0
Liberal	Trevor Coomber	4,976	28.1	−5.1
Independent	Murray Andrew	3,227	18.3	+18.3
Confederate Action	Jeanie O'Kane	1,492	8.4	+8.4
Total formal votes		17,678	97.0	
Informal votes		547	3.0	
Turnout		18,225	86.1	
Two-candidate-preferred result
National	Rob Borbidge	8,668	52.9	−11.9
Liberal	Trevor Coomber	7,708	47.1	+47.1
National hold		Swing	−11.9	

=== Tablelands ===
1992 Queensland state election: Tablelands
Party	Candidate	Votes	%	±%
National	Tom Gilmore	11,189	58.6	+10.1
Labor	Fred Cattarossi	6,257	32.8	−10.9
Confederate Action	Michael Sheather	1,642	8.6	+8.6
Total formal votes		19,088	98.3	
Informal votes		332	1.7	
Turnout		19,420	90.8	
Two-party-preferred result
National	Tom Gilmore	11,934	64.4	+10.5
Labor	Fred Cattarossi	6,608	35.6	−10.5
National hold		Swing	+10.5	

=== Thuringowa ===
1992 Queensland state election: Thuringowa
Party	Candidate	Votes	%	±%
Labor	Ken McElligott	10,062	52.1	−3.4
National	Sandra Chesney	5,482	28.4	+2.4
Liberal	Harold Burch	2,980	15.4	−3.0
Independent	Daro Maroevic	795	4.1	+4.1
Total formal votes		19,319	97.4	
Informal votes		523	2.6	
Turnout		19,842	92.1	
Two-party-preferred result
Labor	Ken McElligott	10,627	57.1	−1.9
National	Sandra Chesney	7,973	42.9	+1.9
Labor hold		Swing	−1.9	

=== Toowoomba North ===
1992 Queensland state election: Toowoomba North
Party	Candidate	Votes	%	±%
Labor	John Flynn	9,249	45.2	+2.5
National	Graham Healy	8,077	39.5	+12.5
Liberal	Rosalie Lang	1,878	9.2	−14.5
Confederate Action	Allen Parsons	837	4.1	+4.1
Indigenous Peoples	Walter McCarthy	428	2.1	+2.1
Total formal votes		20,469	98.1	
Informal votes		405	1.9	
Turnout		20,874	92.8	
Two-party-preferred result
National	Graham Healy	9,986	50.5	+1.4
Labor	John Flynn	9,787	49.5	−1.4
National gain from Labor		Swing	+1.4	

=== Toowoomba South ===
1992 Queensland state election: Toowoomba South
Party	Candidate	Votes	%	±%
National	Mike Horan	12,681	61.2	+22.0
Labor	Con Carlyon	8,047	38.8	+3.5
Total formal votes		20,728	98.0	
Informal votes		421	2.0	
Turnout		21,149	92.6	
National hold		Swing	+1.8	

=== Townsville ===
1992 Queensland state election: Townsville
Party	Candidate	Votes	%	±%
Labor	Geoff Smith	10,839	51.4	−6.2
Liberal	Damien Massingham	4,215	20.0	+4.5
National	Jack Muller	3,271	15.5	−9.5
Independent	Colin Edwards	2,744	13.0	+13.0
Total formal votes		21,069	97.3	
Informal votes		593	2.7	
Turnout		21,662	87.8	
Two-party-preferred result
Labor	Geoff Smith	12,019	61.2	−0.1
Liberal	Damien Massingham	7,631	38.8	+38.8
Labor hold		Swing	−0.1	

=== Warrego ===
1992 Queensland state election: Warrego
Party	Candidate	Votes	%	±%
National	Howard Hobbs	8,648	61.0	+7.5
Labor	Mike Beilby	4,889	34.5	+0.6
Independent	Ian Hannah	640	4.5	+4.5
Total formal votes		14,177	98.7	
Informal votes		180	1.3	
Turnout		14,357	91.7	
Two-party-preferred result
National	Howard Hobbs	8,919	63.6	+0.3
Labor	Mike Beilby	5,111	36.4	−0.3
National hold		Swing	+0.3	

=== Warwick ===
1992 Queensland state election: Warwick
Party	Candidate	Votes	%	±%
National	Lawrence Springborg	11,287	56.1	+15.5
Labor	Michael Bathersby	7,464	37.1	+6.4
Liberal	Ruth Buchanan	1,386	6.9	−8.0
Total formal votes		20,137	98.1	
Informal votes		384	1.9	
Turnout		20,521	93.5	
Two-party-preferred result
National	Lawrence Springborg	12,236	61.4	+0.4
Labor	Michael Bathersby	7,683	38.6	−0.4
National hold		Swing	+0.4	

=== Waterford ===
1992 Queensland state election: Waterford
Party	Candidate	Votes	%	±%
Labor	Tom Barton	10,276	54.9	−8.1
Liberal	Ray Hackwood	4,123	22.0	+0.3
National	Neil Conway	2,906	15.5	+0.7
Independent	Owen Dare	875	4.7	+4.7
Independent	John Johnstone	543	2.9	+2.9
Total formal votes		18,723	96.8	
Informal votes		624	3.2	
Turnout		19,347	89.1	
Two-party-preferred result
Labor	Tom Barton	10,879	60.8	−3.4
Liberal	Ray Hackwood	7,007	39.2	+3.4
Labor hold		Swing	−3.4	

=== Western Downs ===
1992 Queensland state election: Western Downs
Party	Candidate	Votes	%	±%
National	Brian Littleproud	14,060	67.0	−6.1
Labor	Anne Jones	4,214	20.1	−5.0
Independent	Lorraine Wheelson	2,435	11.6	+11.6
Independent	James Clarke	265	1.3	+1.3
Total formal votes		20,974	98.6	
Informal votes		307	1.4	
Turnout		21,281	93.6	
Two-party-preferred result
National	Brian Littleproud	14,856	76.6	+2.1
Labor	Anne Jones	4,532	23.4	−2.1
National hold		Swing	+2.1	

=== Whitsunday ===
1992 Queensland state election: Whitsunday
Party	Candidate	Votes	%	±%
Labor	Lorraine Bird	9,594	49.7	−2.5
National	Rob Dawson	7,332	38.0	+8.2
Liberal	John McCulloch	2,383	12.3	+1.0
Total formal votes		19,309	97.9	
Informal votes		416	2.1	
Turnout		19,725	90.6	
Two-party-preferred result
Labor	Lorraine Bird	9,874	52.2	−3.9
National	Rob Dawson	9,042	47.8	+3.9
Labor hold		Swing	−3.9	

=== Woodridge ===
1992 Queensland state election: Woodridge
Party	Candidate	Votes	%	±%
Labor	Bill D'Arcy	11,117	66.2	−4.4
Liberal	Debbie Planincic	2,719	16.2	−2.5
Independent	Graeme Collins	1,821	10.8	+10.8
Indigenous Peoples	Col Smith	572	3.4	+3.4
Indigenous Peoples	Linette Van Issum	570	3.4	+3.4
Total formal votes		16,799	95.6	
Informal votes		771	4.4	
Turnout		17,570	88.1	
Two-party-preferred result
Labor	Bill D'Arcy	11,824	75.2	+3.9
Liberal	Debbie Planincic	3,905	24.8	−3.9
Labor hold		Swing	+3.9	

=== Yeronga ===
1992 Queensland state election: Yeronga
Party	Candidate	Votes	%	±%
Labor	Matt Foley	12,410	63.5	+4.3
Liberal	Iain Moore	7,142	36.5	+6.8
Total formal votes		19,552	97.4	
Informal votes		524	2.6	
Turnout		20,076	91.5	
Labor hold		Swing	+2.9	

== See also ==
- 1992 Queensland state election
- Members of the Queensland Legislative Assembly, 1989–1992
- Members of the Queensland Legislative Assembly, 1992–1995
- Candidates of the Queensland state election, 1992
