= Results of the 1995 Queensland state election =

Queensland state election, 15 July 1995 Legislative Assembly << 1992–1998 >>
Enrolled voters	2,007,450				
Votes cast	1,835,510		Turnout	91.43%	–0.05%
Informal votes	32,030		Informal	1.75%	–0.50%
Summary of votes by party
Party	Primary votes	%	Swing	Seats	Change
Labor	773,585	42.89%	–5.84%	45	–9
National	473,497	26.25%	+2.54%	29	+3
Liberal	410,083	22.74%	+2.30%	14	+5
Greens	51,748	2.87%	+2.57%	0	±0
Democrats	22,598	1.25%	+0.82%	0	±0
Confederate Action	9,329	0.52%	–0.83%	0	±0
Independent	62,640	3.47%	–1.94%	1	+1
Total	1,803,480			89	
Two-party-preferred
Labor	842,766	46.73%	–7.15%		
National/Liberal	960,714	53.27%	+7.15%		

This is a list of electoral district results for the Queensland 1995 election.

== Results by electoral district ==
=== Albert ===
1995 Queensland state election: Albert
Party	Candidate	Votes	%	±%
National	Bill Baumann	11,505	47.9	+19.4
Labor	John Szczerbanik	9,499	39.6	−8.7
Greens	Bill Heck	1,491	6.2	+6.2
Democrats	Sharon Lucht	998	4.2	+4.2
Independent	John O'Connor	515	2.1	+2.1
Total formal votes		24,008	98.1	+0.6
Informal votes		468	1.9	−0.6
Turnout		24,476	90.5	
Two-party-preferred result
National	Bill Baumann	12,392	53.9	+5.5
Labor	John Szczerbanik	10,602	46.1	−5.5
National gain from Labor		Swing	+5.5	

=== Archerfield ===
1995 Queensland state election: Archerfield
Party	Candidate	Votes	%	±%
Labor	Len Ardill	11,794	56.1	−9.1
Liberal	Adam Low	9,224	43.9	+9.1
Total formal votes		21,018	97.7	+0.7
Informal votes		500	2.3	−0.7
Turnout		21,518	92.3	+0.0
Labor hold		Swing	−9.1	

=== Ashgrove ===
1995 Queensland state election: Ashgrove
Party	Candidate	Votes	%	±%
Labor	Jim Fouras	8,567	44.5	−11.0
Liberal	Peter Rowell	8,347	43.4	+13.7
Democrats	Leo Talty	1,483	7.7	+7.7
Independent	Roger Brand	607	3.2	+3.2
Independent	Ray Sargent	250	1.3	−2.5
Total formal votes		19,254	98.5	+0.1
Informal votes		301	1.5	−0.1
Turnout		19,555	92.4	
Two-party-preferred result
Labor	Jim Fouras	9,647	51.3	−8.0
Liberal	Peter Rowell	9,149	48.7	+8.0
Labor hold		Swing	−8.0	

=== Aspley ===
1995 Queensland state election: Aspley
Party	Candidate	Votes	%	±%
Liberal	John Goss	11,420	51.7	+9.3
Labor	Madonna Jarrett	8,543	38.6	−8.9
Democrats	Tanya Price	1,319	6.0	+6.0
Independent	Jeff Gehrmann	828	3.7	+3.7
Total formal votes		22,110	98.5	+0.5
Informal votes		331	1.5	−0.5
Turnout		22,441	94.0	
Two-party-preferred result
Liberal	John Goss	12,397	56.9	+5.9
Labor	Madonna Jarrett	8,543	43.1	−5.9
Liberal hold		Swing	+5.9	

=== Barambah ===
1995 Queensland state election: Barambah
Party	Candidate	Votes	%	±%
National	Trevor Perrett	14,202	67.2	+12.7
Labor	Scott Zackeresen	4,973	23.5	−1.4
Confederate Action	Neville Reimers	1,955	9.3	+9.3
Total formal votes		21,130	98.5	+0.4
Informal votes		320	1.5	−0.4
Turnout		21,450	93.4	−0.1
Two-party-preferred result
National	Trevor Perrett	15,552	74.4	+5.0
Labor	Scott Zackeresen	5,350	25.6	−5.0
National hold		Swing	+5.0	

=== Barron River ===
1995 Queensland state election: Barron River
Party	Candidate	Votes	%	±%
Labor	Lesley Clark	6,981	38.2	−6.7
Liberal	Lyn Warwick	4,764	26.1	+5.0
National	Ron Crew	3,836	21.0	−2.9
Greens	Chris Nielsen	1,900	10.4	+2.7
Democrats	Leonie Watson	414	2.3	+2.3
Independent	Steve Dimitriou	241	1.3	−1.1
Independent	Brian Hoffman	119	0.7	+0.7
Total formal votes		18,255	98.5	+0.5
Informal votes		275	1.5	−0.5
Turnout		18,530	87.2	
Two-party-preferred result
Liberal	Lyn Warwick	8,521	50.4	+50.4
Labor	Lesley Clark	8,389	49.6	−3.8
Liberal gain from Labor		Swing	+3.8	

=== Beaudesert ===
1995 Queensland state election: Beaudesert
Party	Candidate	Votes	%	±%
National	Kev Lingard	11,993	56.3	+16.7
Labor	Pat Taylor	7,833	36.7	−8.1
Democrats	Arthur Hickman	1,492	7.0	+7.0
Total formal votes		21,318	98.6	+0.8
Informal votes		313	1.4	−0.8
Turnout		21,631	92.1	
Two-party-preferred result
National	Kev Lingard	12,496	59.5	+6.2
Labor	Pat Taylor	8,520	40.5	−6.2
National hold		Swing	+6.2	

=== Brisbane Central ===
1995 Queensland state election: Brisbane Central
Party	Candidate	Votes	%	±%
Labor	Peter Beattie	8,651	50.0	−8.7
Liberal	Jason Aldworth	6,153	35.5	+3.2
Greens	Richard Nielsen	1,631	9.4	+9.4
Independent	Zanny Begg	541	3.1	+3.1
Independent	Guy McGhie	340	2.0	+2.0
Total formal votes		17,316	98.0	+0.5
Informal votes		357	2.0	−0.5
Turnout		17,673	87.3	
Two-party-preferred result
Labor	Peter Beattie	10,089	60.3	−4.6
Liberal	Jason Aldworth	6,649	39.7	+4.6
Labor hold		Swing	−4.6	

=== Broadwater ===
1995 Queensland state election: Broadwater
Party	Candidate	Votes	%	±%
National	Allan Grice	12,364	61.2	+27.7
Labor	Bob Brown	7,839	38.8	+0.5
Total formal votes		20,203	98.0	+0.0
Informal votes		403	2.0	−0.0
Turnout		20,606	88.9	
National hold		Swing	+4.3	

=== Bulimba ===
1995 Queensland state election: Bulimba
Party	Candidate	Votes	%	±%
Labor	Pat Purcell	11,095	55.8	−6.4
Liberal	Toni Drewett	6,491	32.7	+8.0
Greens	Barry Wilson	2,287	11.5	−1.6
Total formal votes		19,873	98.1	+0.7
Informal votes		395	1.9	−0.7
Turnout		20,268	91.3	
Two-party-preferred result
Labor	Pat Purcell	12,171	62.6	−7.9
Liberal	Toni Drewett	7,276	37.4	+7.9
Labor hold		Swing	−7.9	

=== Bundaberg ===
1995 Queensland state election: Bundaberg
Party	Candidate	Votes	%	±%
Labor	Clem Campbell	10,229	50.5	−0.7
National	Kay McDuff	10,024	49.5	+19.9
Total formal votes		20,253	98.5	+0.5
Informal votes		308	1.5	−0.5
Turnout		20,561	92.6	
Labor hold		Swing	−8.1	

=== Bundamba ===
1995 Queensland state election: Bundamba
Party	Candidate	Votes	%	±%
Labor	Bob Gibbs	11,436	58.1	−11.7
Liberal	Yale Stephens	4,814	24.5	+24.5
Independent	John Ranizowski	3,425	17.4	+17.4
Total formal votes		19,675	96.9	+0.9
Informal votes		635	3.1	−0.9
Turnout		20,310	91.0	
Two-party-preferred result
Labor	Bob Gibbs	12,285	64.8	−5.0
Liberal	Yale Stephens	6,665	35.2	+35.2
Labor hold		Swing	−5.0	

=== Burdekin ===
1995 Queensland state election: Burdekin
Party	Candidate	Votes	%	±%
National	Mark Stoneman	12,598	57.9	+17.0
Labor	Jenny Hill	8,156	37.5	−7.1
Independent	Alex Caldwell	992	4.6	+4.6
Total formal votes		21,746	98.5	+0.4
Informal votes		338	1.5	−0.4
Turnout		22,084	91.7	
Two-party-preferred result
National	Mark Stoneman	13,037	60.6	+8.5
Labor	Jenny Hill	8,488	39.4	−8.5
National hold		Swing	+8.5	

=== Burleigh ===
1995 Queensland state election: Burleigh
Party	Candidate	Votes	%	±%
National	Judy Gamin	10,132	53.8	+22.0
Labor	Mark Whillans	7,508	39.9	−4.7
Democrats	Melinda Norman-Hicks	1,179	6.3	+6.3
Total formal votes		18,819	98.3	+0.4
Informal votes		317	1.7	−0.4
Turnout		19,136	89.9	
Two-party-preferred result
National	Judy Gamin	10,581	57.3	+6.2
Labor	Mark Whillans	7,882	42.7	−6.2
National hold		Swing	+6.2	

=== Burnett ===
1995 Queensland state election: Burnett
Party	Candidate	Votes	%	±%
National	Doug Slack	14,962	61.1	+15.0
Labor	Barbara Woods	9,530	38.9	+3.7
Total formal votes		24,492	98.5	+0.6
Informal votes		371	1.5	−0.6
Turnout		24,863	93.4	
National hold		Swing	+1.6	

=== Caboolture ===
1995 Queensland state election: Caboolture
Party	Candidate	Votes	%	±%
Labor	Jon Sullivan	11,081	47.4	−4.4
National	Bill Newton	10,136	43.4	+20.5
Greens	John Lamb	1,092	4.7	+4.7
Democrats	Marilyn Drewett	1,060	4.5	+4.5
Total formal votes		23,369	98.5	+0.4
Informal votes		363	1.5	−0.4
Turnout		23,732	93.7	−0.2
Two-party-preferred result
Labor	Jon Sullivan	11,982	52.3	−5.6
National	Bill Newton	10,941	47.7	+5.6
Labor hold		Swing	−5.6	

=== Cairns ===
1995 Queensland state election: Cairns
Party	Candidate	Votes	%	±%
Labor	Keith De Lacy	8,186	46.8	−6.2
Liberal	Myles Thompson	7,312	41.8	+17.6
Greens	Pat Daly	1,296	7.4	−1.0
Democrats	Raymond Broomhall	695	4.0	+4.0
Total formal votes		17,489	98.4	+0.5
Informal votes		291	1.6	−0.5
Turnout		17,780	84.3	
Two-party-preferred result
Labor	Keith De Lacy	8,891	52.3	−8.8
Liberal	Myles Thompson	8,094	47.7	+8.8
Labor hold		Swing	−8.8	

=== Callide ===
1995 Queensland state election: Callide
Party	Candidate	Votes	%	±%
National	Di McCauley	13,213	74.4	+8.7
Labor	Katrina McGill	3,693	20.8	+20.8
Confederate Action	Anthony May	858	4.8	−11.2
Total formal votes		17,764	98.9	+0.9
Informal votes		193	1.1	−0.9
Turnout		17,957	94.9	
Two-party-preferred result
National	Di McCauley	13,706	77.7	+1.8
Labor	Katrina McGill	3,925	22.3	+22.3
National hold		Swing	+1.8	

=== Caloundra ===
1995 Queensland state election: Caloundra
Party	Candidate	Votes	%	±%
Liberal	Joan Sheldon	11,562	54.8	+20.2
Labor	Don Wilson	8,041	38.1	−6.3
Democrats	Michael Reckenberg	1,092	5.2	+5.2
Independent	Bob Doring	400	1.9	+1.9
Total formal votes		21,095	98.4	+0.9
Informal votes		342	1.6	−0.9
Turnout		21,437	92.3	
Two-party-preferred result
Liberal	Joan Sheldon	12,056	58.1	+5.8
Labor	Don Wilson	8,703	41.9	−5.8
Liberal hold		Swing	+5.8	

=== Capalaba ===
1995 Queensland state election: Capalaba
Party	Candidate	Votes	%	±%
Labor	Jim Elder	11,377	58.7	−5.9
Liberal	Margaret Uhr	7,995	41.3	+5.9
Total formal votes		19,372	97.6	+0.4
Informal votes		468	2.4	−0.4
Turnout		19,840	93.0	
Labor hold		Swing	−5.9	

=== Charters Towers ===
1995 Queensland state election: Charters Towers
Party	Candidate	Votes	%	±%
National	Rob Mitchell	8,562	55.2	+11.1
Labor	John White	6,151	39.6	−6.0
Independent	Jo Cronin	513	3.3	−2.2
Democrats	Kevin Paine	290	1.9	+1.9
Total formal votes		15,516	98.9	+0.9
Informal votes		169	1.1	−0.9
Turnout		15,685	92.7	+0.5
Two-party-preferred result
National	Rob Mitchell	8,902	58.0	+7.6
Labor	John White	4,668	42.0	−7.6
National hold		Swing	+7.6	

=== Chatsworth ===
1995 Queensland state election: Chatsworth
Party	Candidate	Votes	%	±%
Labor	Terry Mackenroth	11,342	52.3	−2.7
Liberal	Bruce Martin	9,136	42.1	+18.6
Confederate Action	Peter Ousby	1,221	5.6	+5.6
Total formal votes		21,699	98.1	+0.2
Informal votes		429	1.9	−0.2
Turnout		22,128	93.4	
Two-party-preferred result
Labor	Terry Mackenroth	11,680	54.2	−6.9
Liberal	Bruce Martin	9,859	45.8	+6.9
Labor hold		Swing	−6.9	

=== Chermside ===
1995 Queensland state election: Chermside
Party	Candidate	Votes	%	±%
Labor	Terry Sullivan	9,784	51.9	−7.9
Liberal	Zenia Belcher	7,958	42.2	+15.8
Independent	Matthew Low	1,124	6.0	+6.0
Total formal votes		18,866	98.5	+0.5
Informal votes		292	1.5	−0.5
Turnout		19,158	93.3	+0.1
Two-party-preferred result
Labor	Terry Sullivan	10,352	55.3	−6.4
Liberal	Zenia Belcher	8,353	44.7	+6.4
Labor hold		Swing	−6.4	

=== Clayfield ===
1995 Queensland state election: Clayfield
Party	Candidate	Votes	%	±%
Liberal	Santo Santoro	11,521	60.0	+8.9
Labor	Dennis Williams	6,445	33.6	−9.6
Democrats	James Leddy	1,224	6.4	+6.4
Total formal votes		19,190	98.6	+0.5
Informal votes		277	1.4	−0.5
Turnout		19,467	91.2	
Two-party-preferred result
Liberal	Santo Santoro	12,073	64.2	+10.1
Labor	Dennis Williams	6,742	35.8	−10.1
Liberal hold		Swing	+10.1	

=== Cleveland ===
1995 Queensland state election: Cleveland
Party	Candidate	Votes	%	±%
Labor	Darryl Briskey	10,027	47.5	−7.6
Liberal	Peter Turnbull	9,167	43.5	+16.5
Democrats	Janice Potter	1,899	9.0	+9.0
Total formal votes		21,093	98.4	+0.8
Informal votes		336	1.6	−0.8
Turnout		21,429	92.4	
Two-party-preferred result
Labor	Darryl Briskey	10,873	52.5	−5.0
Liberal	Peter Turnbull	9,857	47.5	+5.0
Labor hold		Swing	−5.0	

=== Cook ===
1995 Queensland state election: Cook
Party	Candidate	Votes	%	±%
Labor	Steve Bredhauer	7,603	52.6	+3.6
National	Terry Cranwell	5,220	36.1	+11.1
Independent	Edgar Williams	945	6.5	+6.5
Democrats	Trevor Tim	689	4.8	+4.8
Total formal votes		14,457	98.0	+0.4
Informal votes		297	2.0	−0.4
Turnout		14,754	83.4	
Two-party-preferred result
Labor	Steve Bredhauer	8,118	57.7	−4.5
National	Terry Cranwell	5,953	42.3	+4.5
Labor hold		Swing	−4.5	

=== Crows Nest ===
1995 Queensland state election: Crows Nest
Party	Candidate	Votes	%	±%
National	Russell Cooper	15,820	71.6	+16.5
Labor	John Martin	4,688	21.2	−7.1
Greens	Robert Rowston	1,600	7.2	+7.2
Total formal votes		22,108	98.9	+1.2
Informal votes		254	1.1	−1.2
Turnout		22,362	93.8	+0.6
Two-party-preferred result
National	Russell Cooper	16,415	75.5	+7.0
Labor	John Martin	5,311	24.5	−7.0
National hold		Swing	+7.0	

=== Cunningham ===
1995 Queensland state election: Cunningham
Party	Candidate	Votes	%	±%
National	Tony Elliott	16,317	73.8	+16.5
Labor	David Cooper	5,792	26.2	−5.7
Total formal votes		22,109	98.2	+0.3
Informal votes		399	1.8	−0.3
Turnout		22,508	92.4	+0.2
National hold		Swing	+7.4	

=== Currumbin ===
1995 Queensland state election: Currumbin
Party	Candidate	Votes	%	±%
Labor	Merri Rose	9,425	46.4	−1.2
Liberal	Kerrin Woods	9,181	45.2	+21.4
Greens	Anja Light	1,523	7.5	−2.3
Independent	Kevin Goodwin	196	1.0	+1.0
Total formal votes		20,325	98.7	+0.5
Informal votes		277	1.3	−0.5
Turnout		20,602	90.3	
Two-party-preferred result
Labor	Merri Rose	10,208	51.5	−4.3
Liberal	Kerrin Woods	9,602	48.5	+4.3
Labor hold		Swing	−4.3	

=== Everton ===
1995 Queensland state election: Everton
Party	Candidate	Votes	%	±%
Labor	Rod Welford	10,790	51.0	−8.6
Liberal	Judy Robertson	10,368	49.0	+23.2
Total formal votes		21,158	98.2	+0.6
Informal votes		387	1.8	−0.6
Turnout		21,545	94.0	
Labor hold		Swing	−10.7	

=== Ferny Grove ===
1995 Queensland state election: Ferny Grove
Party	Candidate	Votes	%	±%
Labor	Glen Milliner	10,253	45.9	−11.8
Liberal	Reuben Morris	9,049	40.5	+22.5
Greens	Mark Taylor	2,088	9.3	+9.3
Independent	Brett Gorman	967	4.3	+4.3
Total formal votes		22,357	98.5	+0.6
Informal votes		330	1.5	−0.6
Turnout		22,687	93.9	
Two-party-preferred result
Labor	Glen Milliner	11,567	53.2	−10.6
Liberal	Reuben Morris	10,157	46.8	+10.6
Labor hold		Swing	−10.6	

=== Fitzroy ===
1995 Queensland state election: Fitzroy
Party	Candidate	Votes	%	±%
Labor	Jim Pearce	11,061	56.6	−0.1
National	Karen Mackay	8,473	43.4	+16.7
Total formal votes		19,534	98.6	+0.2
Informal votes		268	1.4	−0.2
Turnout		19,802	92.1	+0.2
Labor hold		Swing	−5.4	

=== Gladstone ===
1995 Queensland state election: Gladstone
Party	Candidate	Votes	%	±%
Labor	Neil Bennett	9,361	43.6	−5.3
Independent	Liz Cunningham	8,598	40.1	+8.5
National	Jenny Elliot	2,659	12.4	−2.1
Greens	Cedric Williams	844	3.9	+3.9
Total formal votes		21,462	98.7	+0.6
Informal votes		288	1.3	−0.6
Turnout		21,750	93.0	
Two-candidate-preferred result
Independent	Liz Cunningham	11,138	53.1	+5.1
Labor	Neil Bennett	9,851	46.9	−5.1
Independent gain from Labor		Swing	+5.1	

=== Greenslopes ===
1995 Queensland state election: Greenslopes
Party	Candidate	Votes	%	±%
Liberal	Ted Radke	9,607	50.1	+10.8
Labor	Gary Fenlon	9,566	49.9	−3.1
Total formal votes		19,173	97.9	−0.1
Informal votes		420	2.1	+0.1
Turnout		19,593	92.3	
Liberal gain from Labor		Swing	+7.3	

=== Gregory ===
1995 Queensland state election: Gregory
Party	Candidate	Votes	%	±%
National	Vaughan Johnson	9,809	68.9	+8.7
Labor	Jamie Lonsdale	4,428	31.1	−8.7
Total formal votes		14,237	98.5	+0.3
Informal votes		212	1.5	−0.3
Turnout		14,449	92.3	
National hold		Swing	+8.7	

=== Gympie ===
1995 Queensland state election: Gympie
Party	Candidate	Votes	%	±%
National	Len Stephan	11,247	54.6	+14.6
Labor	David Warren	6,339	30.8	−4.7
Independent	Inge Schilling	1,608	7.8	+7.8
Democrats	Peter Sykes	1,397	6.8	+6.8
Total formal votes		20,591	98.7	+0.2
Informal votes		278	1.3	−0.2
Turnout		20,869	92.9	
Two-party-preferred result
National	Len Stephan	12,467	62.6	+5.0
Labor	David Warren	7,450	37.4	−5.0
National hold		Swing	+5.0	

=== Hervey Bay ===
1995 Queensland state election: Hervey Bay
Party	Candidate	Votes	%	±%
Labor	Bill Nunn	10,905	48.3	−0.6
National	Tony Nioa	10,159	45.0	+5.3
Democrats	Kathy Shilvock	1,493	6.6	+6.6
Total formal votes		22,557	98.8	+0.7
Informal votes		273	1.2	−0.7
Turnout		22,830	92.8	
Two-party-preferred result
Labor	Bill Nunn	11,552	51.9	+1.3
National	Tony Nioa	10,696	48.1	−1.3
Labor hold		Swing	+1.3	

=== Hinchinbrook ===
1995 Queensland state election: Hinchinbrook
Party	Candidate	Votes	%	±%
National	Marc Rowell	12,908	62.8	+10.5
Labor	Diana O'Brien	6,882	33.5	−14.3
Democrats	John Preece	769	3.7	+3.7
Total formal votes		20,559	98.5	+0.4
Informal votes		320	1.5	−0.4
Turnout		20,879	91.7	
Two-party-preferred result
National	Marc Rowell	13,207	64.7	+12.4
Labor	Diana O'Brien	7,202	35.3	−12.4
National hold		Swing	+12.4	

=== Inala ===
1995 Queensland state election: Inala
Party	Candidate	Votes	%	±%
Labor	Henry Palaszczuk	12,894	68.9	−3.3
Liberal	Andrew Rowland	5,830	31.1	+12.7
Total formal votes		18,724	97.0	+0.1
Informal votes		583	3.0	−0.1
Turnout		19,307	91.4	
Labor hold		Swing	−7.6	

=== Indooroopilly ===
1995 Queensland state election: Indooroopilly
Party	Candidate	Votes	%	±%
Liberal	Denver Beanland	11,270	56.2	−0.2
Labor	Teresa Farruggio	5,660	28.2	−15.4
Greens	Willy Bach	1,798	9.0	+9.0
Democrats	Simon Price	1,336	6.7	+6.7
Total formal votes		20,064	99.0	+1.1
Informal votes		198	1.0	−1.1
Turnout		20,262	90.3	
Two-party-preferred result
Liberal	Denver Beanland	12,418	63.3	+6.9
Labor	Teresa Farruggio	7,214	36.7	−6.9
Liberal hold		Swing	+6.9	

=== Ipswich ===
1995 Queensland state election: Ipswich
Party	Candidate	Votes	%	±%
Labor	David Hamill	10,802	51.7	−9.5
Liberal	Steve Wilson	8,024	38.4	+25.0
Greens	Desiree Mahoney	1,551	7.4	+7.4
Independent	Bill Yabsley	524	2.5	+2.5
Total formal votes		20,901	98.0	+0.8
Informal votes		432	2.0	−0.8
Turnout		21,333	93.2	
Two-party-preferred result
Labor	David Hamill	11,423	56.4	−11.3
Liberal	Steve Wilson	8,815	43.6	+11.3
Labor hold		Swing	−11.3	

=== Ipswich West ===
1995 Queensland state election: Ipswich West
Party	Candidate	Votes	%	±%
Labor	Don Livingstone	11,312	50.8	−8.3
National	Jack Else	7,873	35.3	+11.9
Independent	Paul Vaughan	3,090	13.9	+13.9
Total formal votes		22,275	97.8	+0.7
Informal votes		511	2.2	−0.7
Turnout		22,786	93.9	
Two-party-preferred result
Labor	Don Livingstone	12,008	55.5	−7.2
National	Jack Else	9,630	44.5	+7.2
Labor hold		Swing	−7.2	

=== Kallangur ===
1995 Queensland state election: Kallangur
Party	Candidate	Votes	%	±%
Labor	Ken Hayward	12,576	48.1	−14.1
Liberal	Scott Driscoll	9,496	36.3	−1.6
Greens	Craig Josey	2,564	9.8	+9.8
Independent	Rona Joyner	1,536	5.9	+5.9
Total formal votes		26,172	97.8	+1.0
Informal votes		591	2.2	−1.0
Turnout		26,763	92.8	
Two-party-preferred result
Labor	Ken Hayward	13,623	54.0	−8.1
Liberal	Scott Driscoll	11,604	46.0	+8.1
Labor hold		Swing	−8.1	

=== Kedron ===
1995 Queensland state election: Kedron
Party	Candidate	Votes	%	±%
Labor	Paul Braddy	10,360	59.19	+0.10
Liberal	Richard Schellbach	7,142	40.81	+21.40
Total formal votes		17,502	97.21	−0.53
Informal votes		503	2.79	+0.53
Turnout		18,005	91.68	+0.19
Labor hold		Swing	−7.1	

=== Keppel ===
1995 Queensland state election: Keppel
Party	Candidate	Votes	%	±%
National	Vince Lester	13,543	57.3	+17.5
Labor	Bruce Saunders	8,589	36.4	−5.2
Greens	Bob Muir	1,483	6.3	+6.3
Total formal votes		23,615	98.9	+0.6
Informal votes		264	1.1	−0.6
Turnout		23,879	92.6	
Two-party-preferred result
National	Vince Lester	14,051	60.3	+8.9
Labor	Bruce Saunders	9,233	39.7	−8.9
National hold		Swing	+8.9	

=== Kurwongbah ===
1995 Queensland state election: Kurwongbah
Party	Candidate	Votes	%	±%
Labor	Margaret Woodgate	9,810	45.0	−12.2
Liberal	Dennis Sharkey	7,055	32.4	+12.6
Independent	Rob Akers	2,129	9.8	+9.8
Greens	Kim Pantano	2,009	9.2	+9.2
Confederate Action	Paul Hunter	800	3.7	+3.7
Total formal votes		21,803	98.6	+0.7
Informal votes		319	1.4	−0.7
Turnout		22,122	93.0	−0.8
Two-party-preferred result
Labor	Margaret Woodgate	11,326	55.9	−7.2
Liberal	Dennis Sharkey	8,936	44.1	+7.2
Labor hold		Swing	7.2	

=== Lockyer ===
1995 Queensland state election: Lockyer
Party	Candidate	Votes	%	±%
National	Tony Fitzgerald	15,390	66.6	+16.5
Labor	Lance McCallum	6,183	26.8	−2.8
Confederate Action	Pat Andrew	1,527	6.6	−4.8
Total formal votes		23,100	98.4	+0.1
Informal votes		374	1.6	−0.1
Turnout		23,474	93.8	
Two-party-preferred result
National	Tony Fitzgerald	16,168	70.8	+5.7
Labor	Lance McCallum	6,663	29.2	−5.7
National hold		Swing	+5.7	

=== Logan ===
1995 Queensland state election: Logan
Party	Candidate	Votes	%	±%
Labor	Wayne Goss	14,945	66.9	−2.1
National	Gordon Ritter	7,389	33.1	+20.0
Total formal votes		22,334	97.2	+0.1
Informal votes		635	2.8	−0.1
Turnout		22,969	90.9	
Labor hold		Swing	−8.4	

=== Lytton ===
1995 Queensland state election: Lytton
Party	Candidate	Votes	%	±%
Labor	Tom Burns	11,395	56.2	−13.6
Liberal	Jenny Mansell	7,098	35.0	+4.8
Greens	Bert Nord	1,786	8.8	+8.8
Total formal votes		20,279	98.4	+0.8
Informal votes		321	1.6	−0.8
Turnout		20,600	93.0	
Two-party-preferred result
Labor	Tom Burns	12,266	61.3	−8.5
Liberal	Jenny Mansell	7,740	38.7	+8.5
Labor hold		Swing	−8.5	

=== Mackay ===
1995 Queensland state election: Mackay
Party	Candidate	Votes	%	±%
Labor	Tim Mulherin	10,144	52.5	−2.5
National	Bruce Avenell	7,536	39.0	+15.7
Confederate Action	Peter Barbour	1,641	8.5	−5.3
Total formal votes		19,321	98.0	−0.1
Informal votes		403	2.0	+0.1
Turnout		19,724	90.0	
Two-party-preferred result
Labor	Tim Mulherin	10,587	55.7	−8.5
National	Bruce Avenell	8,433	44.3	+8.5
Labor hold		Swing	−8.5	

=== Mansfield ===
1995 Queensland state election: Mansfield
Party	Candidate	Votes	%	±%
Liberal	Frank Carroll	12,020	51.9	+15.4
Labor	Laurel Power	8,958	38.6	−11.9
Greens	Lorrelle Saunders	2,202	9.5	+9.5
Total formal votes		23,180	98.7	+0.7
Informal votes		306	1.3	−0.7
Turnout		23,486	93.1	
Two-party-preferred result
Liberal	Frank Carroll	12,962	56.7	+9.3
Labor	Laurel Power	9,899	43.3	−9.3
Liberal gain from Labor		Swing	+9.3	

=== Maroochydore ===
1995 Queensland state election: Maroochydore
Party	Candidate	Votes	%	±%
National	Fiona Simpson	12,209	57.7	+25.6
Labor	Ken King	6,709	31.7	−8.0
Greens	Susie Chapman	2,254	10.6	+10.6
Total formal votes		21,172	98.6	+1.0
Informal votes		297	1.4	−1.0
Turnout		21,469	90.1	
Two-party-preferred result
National	Fiona Simpson	12,928	62.3	+8.2
Labor	Ken King	7,835	37.7	−8.2
National hold		Swing	+8.2	

=== Maryborough ===
1995 Queensland state election: Maryborough
Party	Candidate	Votes	%	±%
Labor	Bob Dollin	8,975	46.4	−2.7
National	Lloyd Maddern	8,704	45.0	+10.2
Democrats	Pamela Howard	1,678	8.7	+8.7
Total formal votes		19,357	98.6	+0.3
Informal votes		270	1.4	−0.3
Turnout		19,627	94.5	
Two-party-preferred result
Labor	Bob Dollin	9,599	50.4	−2.9
National	Lloyd Maddern	9,457	49.6	+2.9
Labor hold		Swing	−2.9	

=== Merrimac ===
1995 Queensland state election: Merrimac
Party	Candidate	Votes	%	±%
Liberal	Bob Quinn	13,200	65.4	+32.3
Labor	Matthew Loader	6,974	34.6	−1.0
Total formal votes		20,174	97.8	−0.2
Informal votes		456	2.2	+0.2
Turnout		20,630	88.0	+0.1
Liberal hold		Swing	+4.9	

=== Mirani ===
1995 Queensland state election: Mirani
Party	Candidate	Votes	%	±%
National	Ted Malone	12,461	56.0	+12.7
Labor	Barry Gomersall	8,650	38.9	−1.0
Independent	Ronnie Bell	1,127	5.1	+5.1
Total formal votes		22,238	98.5	−0.1
Informal votes		328	1.5	+0.1
Turnout		22,566	92.7	
Two-party-preferred result
National	Ted Malone	12,965	59.1	+4.7
Labor	Barry Gomersall	8,983	40.9	−4.7
National hold		Swing	+4.7	

=== Moggill ===
1995 Queensland state election: Moggill
Party	Candidate	Votes	%	±%
Liberal	David Watson	14,246	66.9	+20.6
Labor	Laurie Lumsden	7,041	33.1	−4.5
Total formal votes		21,287	98.2	−0.4
Informal votes		388	1.8	+0.4
Turnout		21,675	92.2	
Liberal hold		Swing	+7.8	

=== Mooloolah ===
1995 Queensland state election: Mooloolah
Party	Candidate	Votes	%	±%
Liberal	Bruce Laming	14,398	63.8	+29.5
Labor	Marc Zande	5,957	26.4	−5.4
Greens	Janein McLeod	1,924	8.5	+8.5
Independent	Santo Ferraro	281	1.3	−6.3
Total formal votes		22,560	98.6	+0.6
Informal votes		327	1.4	−0.6
Turnout		22,887	90.8	−0.5
Two-party-preferred result
Liberal	Bruce Laming	15,225	69.3	+6.4
Labor	Marc Zande	6,741	30.7	−6.4
Liberal hold		Swing	+6.4	

=== Mount Coot-tha ===
1995 Queensland state election: Mount Coot-tha
Party	Candidate	Votes	%	±%
Labor	Wendy Edmond	7,571	38.8	−17.2
Liberal	Rolene Orford	7,228	37.0	+11.4
Greens	Drew Hutton	4,724	24.2	+24.2
Total formal votes		19,523	98.7	+0.5
Informal votes		261	1.3	−0.5
Turnout		19,784	88.1	
Two-party-preferred result
Labor	Wendy Edmond	9,883	53.5	−8.9
Liberal	Rolene Orford	8,597	46.5	+8.9
Labor hold		Swing	−8.9	

=== Mount Gravatt ===
1995 Queensland state election: Mount Gravatt
Party	Candidate	Votes	%	±%
Labor	Judy Spence	9,808	52.1	−4.3
Liberal	Joe Hodgson	9,034	47.9	+9.8
Total formal votes		18,842	97.9	−0.1
Informal votes		406	2.1	+0.1
Turnout		19,248	92.2	−0.3
Labor hold		Swing	−7.1	

=== Mount Isa ===
1995 Queensland state election: Mount Isa
Party	Candidate	Votes	%	±%
Labor	Tony McGrady	8,198	64.6	+3.2
National	Ronald Bird	3,637	28.6	+7.7
Independent	Clarence Walden	865	6.8	+6.8
Total formal votes		12,700	98.5	+0.7
Informal votes		190	1.5	−0.7
Turnout		12,890	85.3	
Two-party-preferred result
Labor	Tony McGrady	8,616	68.7	+1.1
National	Ronald Bird	3,922	31.3	−1.1
Labor hold		Swing	+1.1	

=== Mount Ommaney ===
1995 Queensland state election: Mount Ommaney
Party	Candidate	Votes	%	±%
Liberal	Bob Harper	9,913	46.6	−2.1
Labor	Peter Pyke	8,718	41.0	−10.3
Greens	Sue Russell	1,595	7.5	+7.5
Democrats	Julie McCredden	908	4.3	+4.3
Independent	Nicholas Kapsis	131	0.6	+0.6
Total formal votes		21,265	98.8	+0.9
Informal votes		266	1.2	−0.9
Turnout		21,531	92.6	
Two-party-preferred result
Liberal	Bob Harper	10,752	51.7	+2.9
Labor	Peter Pyke	10,051	48.3	−2.9
Liberal gain from Labor		Swing	+2.9	

=== Mulgrave ===
1995 Queensland state election: Mulgrave
Party	Candidate	Votes	%	±%
National	Naomi Wilson	9,214	46.0	+16.0
Labor	Warren Pitt	9,056	45.2	−3.0
Greens	Jonathan Metcalfe	1,094	5.5	+5.5
Democrats	Sonya Kremser	676	3.4	+3.4
Total formal votes		20,040	98.4	+0.4
Informal votes		325	1.6	−0.4
Turnout		20,365	90.7	
Two-party-preferred result
National	Naomi Wilson	9,932	50.5	+3.6
Labor	Warren Pitt	9,748	49.5	−3.6
National gain from Labor		Swing	+3.6	

=== Mundingburra ===
1995 Queensland state election: Mundingburra
Party	Candidate	Votes	%	±%
Liberal	Frank Tanti	8,541	44.4	+20.3
Labor	Ken Davies	8,429	43.8	−9.3
Greens	Russell Cumming	2,265	11.8	+11.8
Total formal votes		19,235	98.5	+1.4
Informal votes		287	1.5	−1.4
Turnout		19,522	88.6	
Two-party-preferred result
Labor	Ken Davies	9,308	50.04	−9.4
Liberal	Frank Tanti	9,292	49.96	+9.4
Labor hold		Swing	−9.4	

- This result was overturned by the Court of Disputed Returns and was recontested at the 1996 Mundingburra state by-election.

=== Murrumba ===
1995 Queensland state election: Murrumba
Party	Candidate	Votes	%	±%
Labor	Dean Wells	11,848	57.2	−5.9
Liberal	Fran Jones	8,867	42.8	+13.3
Total formal votes		20,715	97.6	+0.6
Informal votes		499	2.4	−0.6
Turnout		21,214	92.9	
Labor hold		Swing	−9.1	

=== Nerang ===
1995 Queensland state election: Nerang
Party	Candidate	Votes	%	±%
Liberal	Ray Connor	13,343	57.8	+26.8
Labor	Elham Alamar	7,233	31.3	−8.8
Greens	Antony Bradshaw	2,508	10.9	+10.9
Total formal votes		23,084	98.3	+0.7
Informal votes		405	1.7	−0.7
Turnout		23,489	90.0	+0.1
Two-party-preferred result
Liberal	Ray Connor	14,156	63.6	+8.8
Labor	Elham Alamar	8,106	36.4	−8.8
Liberal hold		Swing	+8.8	

=== Nicklin ===
1995 Queensland state election: Nicklin
Party	Candidate	Votes	%	±%
National	Neil Turner	13,356	57.8	+30.2
Labor	Coleen Giles	7,328	31.7	+3.6
Democrats	Kirsten Kirk	2,442	10.6	+10.6
Total formal votes		23,126	98.4	+0.2
Informal votes		387	1.6	−0.2
Turnout		23,513	90.7	
Two-party-preferred result
National	Neil Turner	14,244	62.8	+5.0
Labor	Coleen Giles	8,422	37.2	−5.0
National hold		Swing	+5.0	

=== Noosa ===
1995 Queensland state election: Noosa
Party	Candidate	Votes	%	±%
Liberal	Bruce Davidson	13,230	58.0	+19.0
Labor	Ross Macleod	8,476	37.2	−9.0
Independent	Ian McNiven	1,085	4.8	+4.8
Total formal votes		22,791	98.5	+0.3
Informal votes		352	1.5	−0.3
Turnout		23,143	90.3	
Two-party-preferred result
Liberal	Bruce Davidson	13,819	61.2	+8.8
Labor	Ross Macleod	8,753	38.8	−8.8
Liberal hold		Swing	+8.8	

=== Nudgee ===
1995 Queensland state election: Nudgee
Party	Candidate	Votes	%	±%
Labor	Neil Roberts	12,409	60.7	−8.0
Liberal	Daniel Taylor	8,022	39.3	+8.0
Total formal votes		20,431	97.5	+0.6
Informal votes		524	2.5	−0.6
Turnout		20,955	93.0	
Labor hold		Swing	−8.0	

=== Redcliffe ===
1995 Queensland state election: Redcliffe
Party	Candidate	Votes	%	±%
Labor	Ray Hollis	8,309	44.6	−8.9
Liberal	Judy Beresford	7,468	40.1	+12.8
Independent	Maureen Tyler	1,654	8.9	+8.9
Democrats	John Curtin	837	4.5	+4.5
Independent	Leonard Matthews	356	1.9	+1.9
Total formal votes		18,624	97.8	+0.6
Informal votes		422	2.2	−0.6
Turnout		19,046	91.5	
Two-party-preferred result
Labor	Ray Hollis	8,979	50.4	−8.2
Liberal	Judy Beresford	8,843	49.6	+8.2
Labor hold		Swing	−8.2	

=== Redlands ===
1995 Queensland state election: Redlands
Party	Candidate	Votes	%	±%
National	John Hegarty	10,653	45.8	+17.7
Labor	John Budd	9,484	40.7	−9.0
Democrats	Jenny Van Rooyen	2,014	8.7	+8.7
Independent	Rosemary Skelly	1,132	4.9	+4.9
Total formal votes		23,283	98.3	+0.7
Informal votes		405	1.7	−0.7
Turnout		23,688	93.0	
Two-party-preferred result
National	John Hegarty	12,447	54.6	+9.8
Labor	John Budd	10,353	45.4	−9.8
National gain from Labor		Swing	+9.8	

=== Rockhampton ===
1995 Queensland state election: Rockhampton
Party	Candidate	Votes	%	±%
Labor	Robert Schwarten	10,143	51.9	−5.0
National	Sam Hassall	7,406	37.9	+11.2
Democrats	Chris Head	884	4.5	+4.5
Independent	Nev Thring	690	3.5	+3.5
Independent	Christopher Hooper	419	2.1	+2.1
Total formal votes		19,542	98.2	+0.8
Informal votes		360	1.8	−0.8
Turnout		19,902	92.1	
Two-party-preferred result
Labor	Robert Schwarten	10,704	56.4	−6.7
National	Sam Hassall	8,269	43.6	+6.7
Labor hold		Swing	−6.7	

=== Sandgate ===
1995 Queensland state election: Sandgate
Party	Candidate	Votes	%	±%
Labor	Gordon Nuttall	11,843	56.1	−10.3
Liberal	Anne Hobbs	8,414	39.8	+6.3
Confederate Action	Steve Purtill	859	4.1	+4.1
Total formal votes		21,116	98.0	+1.0
Informal votes		429	2.0	−1.0
Turnout		21,545	92.6	
Two-party-preferred result
Labor	Gordon Nuttall	12,130	57.9	−8.5
Liberal	Anne Hobbs	8,823	42.1	+8.5
Labor hold		Swing	−8.5	

=== South Brisbane ===
1995 Queensland state election: South Brisbane
Party	Candidate	Votes	%	±%
Labor	Anna Bligh	9,409	51.2	−10.0
Liberal	Marcus Clark	6,243	33.9	+6.4
Democrats	Althea Smith	1,624	8.8	+3.9
Independent	Tony Kneipp	742	4.0	+4.0
Independent	Geoff Wilson	375	2.0	+2.0
Total formal votes		18,393	96.9	+0.4
Informal votes		579	3.1	−0.4
Turnout		18,972	86.5	
Two-party-preferred result
Labor	Anna Bligh	10,803	60.7	−7.8
Liberal	Marcus Clark	6,996	39.3	+7.8
Labor hold		Swing	−7.8	

=== Southport ===
1995 Queensland state election: Southport
Party	Candidate	Votes	%	±%
National	Mick Veivers	10,960	51.3	+22.6
Labor	Peter Lawlor	8,630	40.4	−1.4
Democrats	Noel Payne	1,127	5.3	+5.3
Independent	Robyn Cooper	639	3.0	+3.0
Total formal votes		21,356	98.0	+0.1
Informal votes		442	2.0	−0.1
Turnout		21,798	90.0	
Two-party-preferred result
National	Mick Veivers	11,437	54.8	+2.5
Labor	Peter Lawlor	9,428	45.2	−2.5
National hold		Swing	+2.5	

=== Springwood ===
1995 Queensland state election: Springwood
Party	Candidate	Votes	%	±%
Liberal	Luke Woolmer	6,846	37.9	+17.3
Labor	Molly Robson	5,732	31.8	−21.5
Democrats	Peter Collins	3,342	18.5	+18.5
Greens	William Gabriel	1,271	7.0	+7.0
Independent	Allan de Brenni	645	3.6	−3.6
Independent	Patrick O'Leary	204	1.1	+1.1
Total formal votes		18,040	98.4	+0.4
Informal votes		290	1.6	−0.4
Turnout		18,330	92.3	
Two-party-preferred result
Liberal	Luke Woolmer	10,399	60.8	+19.4
Labor	Molly Robson	6,714	39.2	−19.4
Liberal gain from Labor		Swing	+19.4	

=== Sunnybank ===
1995 Queensland state election: Sunnybank
Party	Candidate	Votes	%	±%
Labor	Stephen Robertson	11,173	47.3	−4.7
Liberal	Lynne Friis	10,820	45.8	+16.6
Democrats	Alan Dickson	1,613	6.8	+6.8
Total formal votes		23,606	98.4	+0.4
Informal votes		393	1.6	−0.4
Turnout		23,999	92.9	
Two-party-preferred result
Labor	Stephen Robertson	12,021	51.4	−4.2
Liberal	Lynne Friis	11,381	48.6	+4.2
Labor hold		Swing	−4.2	

=== Surfers Paradise ===
1995 Queensland state election: Surfers Paradise
Party	Candidate	Votes	%	±%
National	Rob Borbidge	12,051	67.3	+22.2
Labor	Peter Burke	4,502	25.1	+25.1
Democrats	Brad Farmer	982	5.5	+5.5
Independent	Christian Jocumsen	369	2.1	+2.1
Total formal votes		17,904	98.5	+1.5
Informal votes		274	1.5	−1.5
Turnout		18,178	86.4	
Two-party-preferred result
National	Rob Borbidge	12,581	71.8	+18.8
Labor	Peter Burke	4,951	28.2	+28.2
National hold		Swing	+18.8	

=== Tablelands ===
1995 Queensland state election: Tablelands
Party	Candidate	Votes	%	±%
National	Tom Gilmore	13,202	69.4	+10.8
Labor	Anthony Shearer	4,652	24.5	−8.3
Democrats	Andrew Howell	839	4.4	+4.4
Independent	Jehan Hainaut	328	1.7	+1.7
Total formal votes		19,021	98.3	+0.0
Informal votes		325	1.7	−0.0
Turnout		19,420	90.8	−1.1
Two-party-preferred result
National	Tom Gilmore	13,698	73.0	+8.6
Labor	Anthony Shearer	5,078	27.0	−8.6
National hold		Swing	+8.6	

=== Thuringowa ===
1995 Queensland state election: Thuringowa
Party	Candidate	Votes	%	±%
Labor	Ken McElligott	10,406	46.5	−5.6
National	Richard Lane	9,881	44.1	+15.7
Democrats	Annette Reed	2,111	9.4	+9.4
Total formal votes		22,398	98.2	+0.8
Informal votes		419	1.8	−0.8
Turnout		22,817	90.6	
Two-party-preferred result
Labor	Ken McElligott	11,292	51.4	−5.7
National	Richard Lane	10,673	48.6	+5.7
Labor hold		Swing	−5.7	

=== Toowoomba North ===
1995 Queensland state election: Toowoomba North
Party	Candidate	Votes	%	±%
National	Graham Healy	11,012	56.7	+17.3
Labor	Des McGovern	7,463	38.4	−6.7
Independent	Ray Webber	936	4.8	+4.8
Total formal votes		19,411	98.3	+0.2
Informal votes		340	1.7	−0.2
Turnout		19,751	92.7	
Two-party-preferred result
National	Graham Healy	11,459	59.6	+9.1
Labor	Des McGovern	7,756	40.4	−9.1
National hold		Swing	−9.1	

=== Toowoomba South ===
1995 Queensland state election: Toowoomba South
Party	Candidate	Votes	%	±%
National	Mike Horan	13,134	66.3	+5.1
Labor	Matt Russell	6,681	33.7	−5.1
Total formal votes		19,815	98.4	+0.4
Informal votes		313	1.6	−0.4
Turnout		20,128	91.9	
National hold		Swing	+5.1	

=== Townsville ===
1995 Queensland state election: Townsville
Party	Candidate	Votes	%	±%
Labor	Geoff Smith	8,674	44.0	−7.5
Liberal	Chris Mills	8,326	42.2	+22.2
Greens	Antony Clunies-Ross	2,722	13.8	+13.8
Total formal votes		19,722	98.1	+0.9
Informal votes		378	1.9	−0.9
Turnout		20,100	86.4	
Two-party-preferred result
Labor	Geoff Smith	9,838	51.8	−9.4
Liberal	Chris Mills	9,160	48.2	+9.4
Labor hold		Swing	−9.4	

=== Warrego ===
1995 Queensland state election: Warrego
Party	Candidate	Votes	%	±%
National	Howard Hobbs	9,115	70.7	+9.7
Labor	Murray Bensted	3,779	29.3	−5.2
Total formal votes		12,894	98.6	−0.1
Informal votes		183	1.4	+0.1
Turnout		13,077	91.5	
National hold		Swing	+7.1	

=== Warwick ===
1995 Queensland state election: Warwick
Party	Candidate	Votes	%	±%
National	Lawrence Springborg	13,393	66.82	+10.77
Labor	Michael Bathersby	5,590	27.89	−9.18
Greens	Sarah Moles	1,061	5.29	+5.29
Total formal votes		20,044	98.74	+0.61
Informal votes		256	1.26	−0.61
Turnout		20,300	93.60	+0.07
Two-party-preferred result
National	Lawrence Springborg	13,792	69.58	+8.15
Labor	Michael Bathersby	6,031	30.42	−8.15
National hold		Swing	+8.15	

=== Waterford ===
1995 Queensland state election: Waterford
Party	Candidate	Votes	%	±%
Labor	Tom Barton	11,891	59.1	+4.2
Liberal	Raymond Hamey	8,225	40.9	+18.9
Total formal votes		20,116	96.8	+0.1
Informal votes		655	3.2	−0.1
Turnout		20,771	88.1	
Labor hold		Swing	−1.7	

=== Western Downs ===
1995 Queensland state election: Western Downs
Party	Candidate	Votes	%	±%
National	Brian Littleproud	16,120	79.4	+12.4
Labor	Brad Wood	4,180	20.6	+0.5
Total formal votes		20,300	98.8	+0.2
Informal votes		254	1.2	−0.2
Turnout		20,554	93.9	+0.2
National hold		Swing	+2.8	

=== Whitsunday ===
1995 Queensland state election: Whitsunday
Party	Candidate	Votes	%	±%
National	Debbie Perske	9,119	45.3	+7.3
Labor	Lorraine Bird	8,986	44.6	−5.1
Greens	Anni Philp	1,185	5.9	+5.9
Democrats	Robert Farr	460	2.3	+2.3
Independent	Michelle MacNevin	398	2.0	+2.0
Total formal votes		20,148	98.5	+0.7
Informal votes		297	1.5	−0.7
Turnout		20,445	91.3	
Two-party-preferred result
Labor	Lorraine Bird	9,827	50.1	−2.1
National	Debbie Perske	9,775	49.9	+2.1
Labor hold		Swing	−2.1	

=== Woodridge ===
1995 Queensland state election: Woodridge
Party	Candidate	Votes	%	±%
Labor	Bill D'Arcy	9,730	61.6	−4.6
Liberal	Matthew Cavanagh	4,026	25.5	+9.3
Independent	Anthony Davis	2,042	12.9	+12.9
Total formal votes		15,798	96.9	+1.3
Informal votes		499	3.1	−1.3
Turnout		16,297	87.3	
Two-party-preferred result
Labor	Bill D'Arcy	10,390	68.1	−7.0
Liberal	Matthew Cavanagh	4,858	31.9	+7.0
Labor hold		Swing	−7.0	

=== Yeronga ===
1995 Queensland state election: Yeronga
Party	Candidate	Votes	%	±%
Labor	Matt Foley	9,466	50.9	−12.5
Liberal	Salli Aitken	7,689	41.4	+4.8
Independent	Bernadette Le Goullon	966	5.2	+5.2
Confederate Action	Leonce Kealy	468	2.5	+2.5
Total formal votes		18,589	98.2	+0.8
Informal votes		345	1.8	−0.8
Turnout		18,934	91.3	−0.2
Two-party-preferred result
Labor	Matt Foley	10,003	54.6	−8.9
Liberal	Salli Aitken	8,316	45.4	+8.9
Labor hold		Swing	−8.9	

== See also ==
- 1995 Queensland state election
- Candidates of the Queensland state election, 1995
- Members of the Queensland Legislative Assembly, 1995-1998
