= Candidates of the 1992 Queensland state election =

The 1992 Queensland state election was held on 19 September 1992.

== Redistribution ==
A redistribution of electoral boundaries occurred in 1991. The zonal system was abolished, with a weighting added for remote electorates over 100,000km2.

The electorates of Auburn, Balonne, Bowen, Broadsound, Carnarvon, Condamine, Cooroora, Fassifern, Flinders, Glass House, Isis, Landsborough, Manly, Merthyr, Mourilyan, Nundah, Peak Downs, Pine Rivers, Port Curtis, Rockhampton North, Roma, Salisbury, Sherwood, Somerset, South Coast, Stafford, Toowong, Townsville East, Windsor, and Wolston were abolished.

The electorates of Beaudesert, Broadwater, Bundamba, Burleigh, Caloundra, Capalaba, Charters Towers, Chermside, Clayfield, Cleveland, Crows Nest, Ferny Grove, Fitzroy, Gladstone, Hervey Bay, Inala, Indooroopilly, Kallangur, Kedron, Keppel, Kurwongbah, Maroochydore, Merrimac, Mooloolah, Mount Ommaney, Mundingburra, Noosa, Sunnybank, Waterford, and Western Downs were created.

The redistribution added 7 more electorates to Greater Brisbane, the Gold Coast, and Sunshine Coast, while leaving 7 less electorates in regional Queensland. Aspley, Clayfield, and Hinchinbrook became notionally Labor-held.

The changes resulted in 59 notionally Labor-held seats, 10 notionally Liberal-held seats, and 20 notionally National-held seats.

- The member for Archerfield, Henry Palaszczuk (Labor), contested Inala.
- The member for Bowen, Ken Smyth (Labor), contested Charters Towers.
- The member for Broadsound, Jim Pearce (Labor), contested Fitzroy.
- The member for Caboolture, Ken Hayward (Labor), contested Kallangur.
- The member for Carnarvon, Lawrence Springborg (National), contested Warwick.
- The member for Condamine, Brian Littleproud (National), contested Western Downs.
- The member for Cooroora, Ray Barber (Labor), contested Noosa.
- The member for Currumbin, Trevor Coomber (Liberal), contested Surfers Paradise.
- The member for Everton, Glen Milliner (Labor), contested Ferny Grove.
- The member for Fassifern, Kev Lingard (National), contested Beaudesert.
- The member for Glass House, Jon Sullivan (Labor), contested Caboolture.
- The member for Isis, Bill Nunn (Labor), contested Hervey Bay.
- The member for Landsborough, Joan Sheldon (Liberal), contested Caloundra.
- The member for Manly, Jim Elder (Labor), contested Capalaba.
- The member for Merthyr, Santo Santoro (Liberal), contested Clayfield.
- The member for Mourilyan, Bill Eaton (Labor), contested Hinchinbrook.
- The member for Nundah, Terry Sullivan (Labor), contested Chermside.
- The member for Peak Downs, Vince Lester (National), contested Keppel.
- The member for Pine Rivers, Margaret Woodgate (Labor), contested Kurwongbah.
- The member for Redlands, Darryl Briskey (Labor), contested Cleveland.
- The member for Rockhampton North, Robert Schwarten (Labor), contested Keppel.
- The member for Roma, Russell Cooper (National), contested Crows Nest.
- The member for Salisbury, Len Ardill (Labor), contested Archerfield.
- The member for Sherwood, David Dunworth (Liberal), contested Mount Ommaney.
- The member for South Coast, Bob Quinn (Liberal), contested Merrimac.
- The member for Stafford, Rod Welford (Labor), contested Everton.
- The member for Toowong, Denver Beanland (Liberal), contested Indooroopilly.
- The member for Townsville, Ken Davies (Labor), contested Mundingburra.
- The member for Townsville East, Geoff Smith (Labor), contested Townsville.
- The member for Windsor, Pat Comben (Labor), contested Kedron.
- The member for Wolston, Bob Gibbs (Labor), contested Bundamba.

== By-elections ==
- On 28 July 1990, Joan Sheldon (Liberal) was elected to succeed Mike Ahern (National), who had resigned on 6 May 1990, as the member for Landsborough.
- On 28 July 1990, David Dunworth (Liberal) was elected to succeed Angus Innes (Liberal), who had resigned on 13 May 1990, as the member for Sherwood.
- On 21 November 1990, the election of Bob King (Liberal) was overturned by the Court of Disputed Returns, who declared National candidate Neil Turner elected rather than ordering a by-election for the seat.
- On 18 May 1991, Terry Sullivan (Labor) was elected to succeed Phil Heath (Labor), who had resigned on 5 April 1991, as the member for Nundah.
- On 18 May 1991, Mike Horan (National) was elected to succeed Clive Berghofer (National), who had vacated his seat on 23 March 1991, as the member for Toowoomba South.

== Retiring Members ==
=== Labor ===
- Ron McLean (Bulimba)
- Bill Prest (Port Curtis)
- Nev Warburton (Sandgate)

=== National ===
- Des Booth (Warwick) - Lost preselection
- Bill Gunn (Somerset)
- Neville Harper (Auburn) - Lost preselection
- Bob Katter (Flinders)
- Don Neal (Balonne)

== Legislative Assembly ==
Sitting members are shown in bold text.

Electorate	Held by	Labor candidate	Liberal candidate	National candidate	Other candidates
Albert	Labor	**John Szczerbanik**	David Logan	Paul Flann	
Archerfield	Labor	**Len Ardill**	Paul Pottinger		
Ashgrove	Labor	**Jim Fouras**	Tony Dempsey	Marie McCullagh	Ray Sargent (Ind)
Aspley	Labor	Terry Hamspon	**John Goss**	Mike Sopinski	
Barambah	National	Peter Allen	Cliff Casswell	**Trevor Perrett**	Bob Young (Ind)
Barron River	Labor	**Lesley Clark**	Norm Millhouse	Ron Crew	Steve Dimitriou (Ind); John Felan (Grn)
Beaudesert	National	Don Petersen	John Taylor	**Kev Lingard**	
Brisbane Central	Labor	**Peter Beattie**	Richards Roberts		Susan Price (Ind)
Broadwater	Liberal	Tom Harrison	Kay Elson	Allan Grice	Felix Cernovs (Ind)
Bulimba	Labor	Pat Purcell	Alvan Hawkes		Barry Wilson (Grn)
Bundaberg	Labor	**Clem Campbell**	Cameron Dale	Paul Petrie	Tony Barr (Ind); Trevor Versace (Ind)
Bundamba	Labor	**Bob Gibbs**			Henrik Schimmel (Ind)
Burdekin	National	Jenny Hill	Steve Szendray	**Mark Stoneman**	
Burleigh	Liberal	Pat Stern	Lyle Schuntner	Judy Gamin	Antony Bradshaw (Ind)
Burnett	National	Michael Klein		**Doug Slack**	Maurice Chapman (Ind); Bill May (CAP)
Caboolture	Labor	**Jon Sullivan**	Joy Leishman	Bill Newton	Dave Groves (Ind)
Cairns	Labor	**Keith De Lacy**	Kel Ryan	Ron Balodis	Jonathan Metcalfe (Grn)
Callide	National			**Di McCauley**	Tom Knight (Ind) Anthony May (CAP)
Caloundra	National	Joe Hannan	**Joan Sheldon**	Liz Bell	
Capalaba	Labor	**Jim Elder**	Bill Vaughan		
Charters Towers	Labor	**Ken Smyth**	Joseph Kirk	Rob Mitchell	Jo Cronin (Ind); Harrison Duncan (Ind)
Chatsworth	Labor	**Terry Mackenroth**	Brett Blade	David Stone	Lou Gugenberger (Grn)
Chermside	Labor	**Terry Sullivan**	Keith Schafferius	Doug Foggo	
Clayfield	Labor	Dennis Williams	**Santo Santoro**		Peter Dove (Ind); Darby McCarthy (AIP)
Cleveland	Labor	**Darryl Briskey**	Edward Santagiuliana	Paul Asher	
Cook	Labor	**Steve Bredhauer**	David Spanagel	John Weightman	David Byrne (Ind); Anton Castro (Ind); Merv Gibson (AIP); Norman Johnson (AIP); George Villaflor (Ind)
Crows Nest	National	Ross Spencer	Neville Stuart	**Russell Cooper**	
Cunningham	National	David Cooper	Ted Radke	**Tony Elliott**	
Currumbin	Liberal	Merri Rose	Andrew Schuller	Bob Hancock	Brad Farmer (Grn)
Everton	Labor	**Rod Welford**	Bryan Carpenter	John Jurss	
Ferny Grove	Labor	**Glen Milliner**	Rex Hawkes	Chris Harding	Des O'Neill (Ind)
Fitzroy	Labor	**Jim Pearce**	Dick Phillips	Marie Mahood	Keith Scantlebury (Ind)
Gladstone	Labor	Neil Bennett	Maree Petty	Jenny Elliot	Liz Cunningham (Ind)
Greenslopes	Labor	**Gary Fenlon**	Graham Young		Simon Bliss (Grn); Stephen Heather (Ind)
Gregory	National	Colleen Dobson		**Vaughan Johnson**	
Gympie	National	Geoffrey Brown	John Cotter	**Len Stephan**	Bruce Chapman (Ind)
Hervey Bay	Labor	**Bill Nunn**	Doug Wickham	Tony Nioa	
Hinchinbrook	Labor	**Bill Eaton**		**Marc Rowell**	
Inala	Labor	**Henry Palaszczuk**	Charles Perry		Norma James (AIP)
Indooroopilly	Liberal	Harold Thornton	**Denver Beanland**		
Ipswich	Labor	**David Hamill**	Shane Moon	John Coyle; Bob Pollock	Ken Dalton (AIP)
Ipswich West	Labor	**Don Livingstone**	Pat Moore	Jack Else	
Kallangur	Labor	**Ken Hayward**	Col Cruden		
Kedron	Labor	**Pat Comben**	Chris Buck	Andrew Hassall	Don Armstrong (Ind); Richard Nielsen (Grn)
Keppel	Labor	**Rob Schwarten**	Kim Shields	**Vince Lester**	Leo Black (CAP); Chris Hooper (Ind); Glenmary Swan (Dem)
Kurwongbah	Labor	**Margaret Woodgate**	Graeme Ashworth	Bruce Stewart	Dennis Sharkey (Ind)
Lockyer	National	Lyn Kally	Robert Lucas	**Tony Fitzgerald**	Geoff Abnett (CAP)
Logan	Labor	**Wayne Goss**	Susie Gilbert	Gordon Ritter	Russell Leneham (Ind)
Lytton	Labor	**Tom Burns**	Tom McKaskill		
Mackay	Labor	**Ed Casey**	David Hamilton	Eric Ross	Sandra Hill (CAP)
Mansfield	Labor	**Laurel Power**	Don Cameron	Glenys Head	
Maroochydore	Liberal	Alison Jackson	Leslie Treichel	Fiona Simpson	Ian McNiven (Ind)
Maryborough	Labor	**Bob Dollin**		Gilbert Alison	Tony Pitt (CAP)
Merrimac	Liberal	Mark Whillans	**Bob Quinn**	Les Mole	Colin Smith (CAP)
Mirani	National	Michael Scriha	Alf Maher	**Jim Randell**	Trevor Howland (CAP)
Moggill	Liberal	Laurie Lumsden	**David Watson**	Trevor St Baker	Geoff Wilson (Ind)
Mooloolah	National	Scott Zackerson	Bruce Laming	Kevin Asmus	Santo Ferraro (Ind)
Mount Coot-tha	Labor	**Wendy Edmond**	Andrew McBryde	Don Caslick	Kerri Kellett (Dem)
Mount Gravatt	Labor	**Judy Spence**	Allan Pidgeon		David McBryde (Ind)
Mount Isa	Labor	**Tony McGrady**	Glen Brown	Jeff Daniels	Jacob George (AIP); Bill Petrie (CAP)
Mount Ommaney	Liberal	Peter Pyke	**David Dunworth**		
Mulgrave	Labor	**Warren Pitt**	Scott Sturgess	John Rossi	Max Menzel (Ind)
Mundingburra	Labor	**Ken Davies**	James Cathcart	Reg Fenton	Colin Parker (Dem)
Murrumba	Labor	**Dean Wells**	Fran Jones		Kevin Hendstock (Ind)
Nerang	Liberal	Tony Carman	**Ray Connor**	Iona Abrahamson	Chris Ivory (Ind)
Nicklin	Liberal	Coleen Giles	Bob King	**Neil Turner**	Hermann Schwabe (Ind)
Noosa	Labor	**Ray Barber**	Bruce Davidson	Barbara Luff	
Nudgee	Labor	**Ken Vaughan**	Max Shadlow		
Redcliffe	Labor	**Ray Hollis**	Allan Sutherland	Alan Boulton	Steven Griffith (Ind)
Redlands	Labor	John Budd	Mike Jones	Paul Clauson	Charles Connelly (Ind); Rick Pisera (Ind)
Rockhampton	Labor	**Paul Braddy**	John Fillod	Ron Bahnisch	Ross Allan (Ind); Peter Boyle (Ind); Peter George (Grn)
Sandgate	Labor	Gordon Nuttall	Rob Dixon		
South Brisbane	Labor	**Anne Warner**	Mark Bromback		Andrew Bartlett (Dem); Netta Tyson (AIP)
Southport	National	Peter Lawlor	Timothy Baker	**Mick Veivers**	Gary Wachter (Ind)
Springwood	Labor	**Molly Robson**	Kym James	John Hegarty	Allan de Brenni (Ind)
Sunnybank	Labor	Stephen Robertson	Gary Hardgrave	Alan Hales	Vivienne Rohrlach (Ind)
Surfers Paradise	National		**Trevor Coomber**	**Rob Borbidge**	Murray Andrew (Ind); Jeanie O'Kane (CAP)
Tablelands	National	Alfredo Cattarossi		**Tom Gilmore**	Michael Sheather (CAP)
Thuringowa	Labor	**Ken McElligott**	Harry Burch	Sandra Chesney	Daro Maroević (Ind)
Toowoomba North	Labor	**John Flynn**	Rosalie Lang	Graham Healy	Walter McCarthy (AIP); Allan Parsons (CAP)
Toowoomba South	National	Con Carlyon		**Mike Horan**	
Townsville	Labor	**Geoff Smith**	Damien Massingham	Jack Muller	Colin Edwards (Ind)
Warrego	National	Mike Beilby		**Howard Hobbs**	Ian Hannah (Ind)
Warwick	National	Michael Bathersby	Ruth Buchanan	**Lawrence Springborg**	
Waterford	Labor	Tom Barton	Ray Hackwood	Neil Conway	Owen Dare (Ind); John Johnstone (Ind)
Western Downs	National	Anne Jones		**Brian Littleproud**	James Clarke (Ind); Lorraine Wheeldon (Ind)
Whitsunday	Labor	**Lorraine Bird**	John McCulloch	Robert Dawson	
Woodridge	Labor	**Bill D'Arcy**	Debbie Planincic		Graeme Collins (Ind); Col Smith (AIP); Linette Van Issum (AIP)
Yeronga	Labor	**Matt Foley**	Iain Moore		

== See also ==
- Members of the Queensland Legislative Assembly, 1989–1992
- Members of the Queensland Legislative Assembly, 1992–1995
- 1992 Queensland state election
- List of political parties in Australia
