= Electoral results for the district of Caboolture =

Queensland, Australia, district election results

This is a list of electoral results for the electoral district of Caboolture in Queensland state elections.

== Members for Caboolture ==
Member	Party	Term
Des Frawley	National	1977–1983
Bill Newton	National	1983–1986
Ken Hayward	Labor	1986–1992
Jon Sullivan	Labor	1992–1998
Bill Feldman	One Nation	1998–1999
Bill Feldman	City Country Alliance	1999–2001

== Election results ==
=== Elections in the 1990s ===
1998 Queensland state election: Caboolture
Party	Candidate	Votes	%	±%
Labor	Jon Sullivan	10,471	39.14	−8.28
One Nation	Bill Feldman	8,008	29.93	+29.93
National	Peter Lacey	6,222	23.26	−20.11
Independent	Bill Newton	1,331	4.98	+4.98
Democrats	Liz Oss-Emer	581	2.17	−2.37
Reform	Brian O'Grady	140	0.52	+0.52
Total formal votes		26,753	98.43	−0.04
Informal votes		426	1.57	+0.04
Turnout		27,179	93.98	+0.29
Two-candidate-preferred result
One Nation	Bill Feldman	13,245	52.69	+52.69
Labor	Jon Sullivan	11,894	47.31	−4.96
One Nation gain from Labor		Swing	+52.69	

1995 Queensland state election: Caboolture
Party	Candidate	Votes	%	±%
Labor	Jon Sullivan	11,081	47.42	−4.44
National	Bill Newton	10,136	43.37	+20.52
Greens	John Lamb	1,092	4.67	+4.67
Democrats	Marilyn Drewett	1,060	4.54	+4.54
Total formal votes		23,369	98.47	+0.44
Informal votes		363	1.53	−0.44
Turnout		23,732	93.69	−0.19
Two-party-preferred result
Labor	Jon Sullivan	11,982	52.27	−5.63
National	Bill Newton	10,941	47.73	+5.63
Labor hold		Swing	−5.63	

1992 Queensland state election: Caboolture
Party	Candidate	Votes	%	±%
Labor	Jon Sullivan	10,736	51.9	+1.0
National	Bill Newton	4,730	22.8	−0.8
Liberal	Joy Leishman	4,273	20.6	+0.7
Independent	Dave Groves	964	4.7	+4.7
Total formal votes		20,703	98.0	
Informal votes		415	2.0	
Turnout		21,118	93.9	
Two-party-preferred result
Labor	Jon Sullivan	11,244	57.9	+2.7
National	Bill Newton	8,177	42.1	−2.7
Labor hold		Swing	+2.7	

=== Elections in the 1980s ===
1989 Queensland state election: Caboolture
Party	Candidate	Votes	%	±%
Labor	Ken Hayward	13,522	56.8	+3.1
Liberal	Bob O'Sullivan	4,629	19.4	+19.4
National	Roy Rogers	2,772	11.6	−34.7
Independent	James Kessels	2,033	8.5	+8.5
Call to Australia	Raymond De Gruchy	614	2.6	+2.6
Independent	Ron Fenton	239	1.0	+1.0
Total formal votes		23,809	96.4	+0.9
Informal votes		882	3.6	−0.9
Turnout		24,691	92.8	+0.8
Two-party-preferred result
Labor	Ken Hayward	14,571	61.2	+7.5
Liberal	Bob O'Sullivan	9,238	38.8	+38.8
Labor hold		Swing	+7.5	

1986 Queensland state election: Caboolture
Party	Candidate	Votes	%	±%
Labor	Ken Hayward	9,956	53.7	
National	Ron Grant	8,572	46.3	
Total formal votes		18,528	95.5	
Informal votes		870	4.5	
Turnout		19,398	92.0	
Labor gain from National		Swing	+1.0	

1983 Queensland state election: Caboolture
Party	Candidate	Votes	%	±%
Labor	Robert Wilson	11,320	44.2	+3.8
National	Bill Newton	11,222	43.8	+1.6
Liberal	Graeme Selby	2,459	9.6	−5.6
Independent	John Bergin	636	2.5	+2.5
Total formal votes		25,637	98.6	+0.5
Informal votes		360	1.4	−0.5
Turnout		25,997	92.7	+3.2
Two-party-preferred result
National	Bill Newton	13,667	53.3	−2.0
Labor	Robert Wilson	11,970	46.7	+2.0
National hold		Swing	−2.0	

1980 Queensland state election: Caboolture
Party	Candidate	Votes	%	±%
National	Des Frawley	8,082	42.2	−16.8
Labor	John McLoughlin	4,567	23.8	−3.6
Labor	Frank Hill	3,174	16.6	+16.6
Liberal	Virginia Day	2,921	15.2	+15.2
Independent	John Ferguson	422	2.2	+2.2
Total formal votes		19,166	98.1	−0.1
Informal votes		378	1.9	+0.1
Turnout		19,544	89.5	−2.3
Two-party-preferred result
National	Des Frawley	10,598	55.3	−3.7
Labor	John McLoughlin	8,568	44.7	+3.7
National hold		Swing	−3.7	

=== Elections in the 1970s ===
1977 Queensland state election: Caboolture
Party	Candidate	Votes	%	±%
National	Des Frawley	8,520	59.0	
Labor	John McLoughlin	3,955	27.4	
Labor	Francis Freemantle	1,973	13.7	
Total formal votes		14,448	98.2	
Informal votes		270	1.8	
Turnout		14,718	91.8	
Two-party-preferred result
National	Des Frawley	8,520	59.0	−7.5
Labor	John McLoughlin	5,928	41.0	+7.5
National hold		Swing	−7.5	
