= Electoral results for the district of Glass House =

Queensland, Australia, district election results

This is a list of electoral results for the electoral district of Glass House in Queensland state elections.

== Members for Glass House ==
First incarnation (1986–1992)
| Member | Party | Term |
|---|---|---|
| Bill Newton | National | 1986–1989 |
| Jon Sullivan | Labor | 1989–1992 |
Second incarnation (2001–present)
| Member | Party | Term |
| Carolyn Male | Labor | 2001–2009 |
| Andrew Powell | Liberal National | 2009–present |

== Election results ==
=== Elections in the 2020s ===
2024 Queensland state election: Glass House
| Party | Candidate | Votes | % | ±% |
|---|---|---|---|---|
| Liberal National | Andrew Powell | 15,149 | 45.42 | +5.12 |
| Labor | Humphrey Caspersz | 7,969 | 23.89 | −8.21 |
| Greens | Andrew McLean | 4,009 | 12.02 | −0.88 |
| One Nation | Adam Farr | 3,668 | 11.00 | +0.70 |
| Legalise Cannabis | Timothy Hallcroft | 1,696 | 5.08 | +5.08 |
| Family First | Bronwen Bolitho | 865 | 2.59 | +2.59 |
| Total formal votes | | 33,356 | 95.66 | −0.91 |
| Informal votes | | 1,515 | 4.34 | +0.91 |
| Turnout | | 34,871 | 89.77 | −0.97 |
Two-party-preferred result
| Liberal National | Andrew Powell | 20,074 | 60.18 | +8.58 |
| Labor | Humphrey Caspersz | 13,282 | 39.82 | −8.58 |
| Liberal National hold | | Swing | +8.58 | |

2020 Queensland state election: Glass House
| Party | Candidate | Votes | % | ±% |
|---|---|---|---|---|
| Liberal National | Andrew Powell | 12,265 | 40.28 | +4.76 |
| Labor | Brent Hampstead | 9,753 | 32.03 | +5.77 |
| Greens | Andrew McLean | 3,937 | 12.93 | +0.05 |
| One Nation | Graeme Campbell | 3,134 | 10.29 | −12.38 |
| Informed Medical Options | Laressa McCoy | 1,015 | 3.33 | +3.33 |
| United Australia | James McDonald | 343 | 1.13 | +1.13 |
| Total formal votes | | 30,447 | 96.57 | +0.14 |
| Informal votes | | 1,083 | 3.43 | −0.14 |
| Turnout | | 31,530 | 90.74 | +1.30 |
Two-party-preferred result
| Liberal National | Andrew Powell | 15,706 | 51.58 | −1.84 |
| Labor | Brent Hampstead | 14,741 | 48.42 | +1.84 |
| Liberal National hold | | Swing | −1.84 | |

=== Elections in the 2010s ===
2017 Queensland state election: Glass House
| Party | Candidate | Votes | % | ±% |
|---|---|---|---|---|
| Liberal National | Andrew Powell | 10,221 | 35.5 | −8.1 |
| Labor | Brent Hampstead | 7,557 | 26.3 | −5.2 |
| One Nation | Tracey Bell-Henselin | 6,525 | 22.7 | +22.7 |
| Greens | Sue Weber | 3,705 | 12.9 | −1.3 |
| Independent | Sue Mureau | 765 | 2.7 | +2.7 |
| Total formal votes | | 28,773 | 96.4 | −1.5 |
| Informal votes | | 1,068 | 3.6 | +1.5 |
| Turnout | | 29,841 | 89.4 | +0.1 |
Two-party-preferred result
| Liberal National | Andrew Powell | 15,373 | 53.4 | +2.5 |
| Labor | Brent Hampstead | 13,400 | 46.6 | −2.5 |
| Liberal National hold | | Swing | +2.5 | |

2015 Queensland state election: Glass House
| Party | Candidate | Votes | % | ±% |
|---|---|---|---|---|
| Liberal National | Andrew Powell | 13,727 | 43.72 | −12.13 |
| Labor | Brent Hampstead | 9,587 | 30.54 | +12.87 |
| Greens | David Knobel | 4,511 | 14.37 | −1.27 |
| Palmer United | Scott Higgins | 3,570 | 11.37 | +11.37 |
| Total formal votes | | 31,395 | 97.82 | +0.16 |
| Informal votes | | 700 | 2.18 | −0.16 |
| Turnout | | 32,095 | 90.60 | −2.02 |
Two-party-preferred result
| Liberal National | Andrew Powell | 14,890 | 51.41 | −18.98 |
| Labor | Brent Hampstead | 14,074 | 48.59 | +18.98 |
| Liberal National hold | | Swing | −18.98 | |

2012 Queensland state election: Glass House
| Party | Candidate | Votes | % | ±% |
|---|---|---|---|---|
| Liberal National | Andrew Powell | 15,910 | 55.85 | +7.23 |
| Labor | Ryan Moore | 5,032 | 17.67 | −16.10 |
| Greens | Stewart Luke | 4,455 | 15.64 | −1.97 |
| Katter's Australian | Peter Harris | 3,088 | 10.84 | +10.84 |
| Total formal votes | | 28,485 | 97.64 | −0.36 |
| Informal votes | | 689 | 2.36 | +0.36 |
| Turnout | | 29,174 | 92.62 | +0.43 |
Two-party-preferred result
| Liberal National | Andrew Powell | 17,573 | 70.39 | +14.58 |
| Labor | Ryan Moore | 7,391 | 29.61 | −14.58 |
| Liberal National hold | | Swing | +14.58 | |

=== Elections in the 2000s ===
2009 Queensland state election: Glass House
| Party | Candidate | Votes | % | ±% |
|---|---|---|---|---|
| Liberal National | Andrew Powell | 13,009 | 48.6 | +15.0 |
| Labor | Jenny Hansen Read | 9,035 | 33.8 | −2.3 |
| Greens | Jenny Fitzgibbon | 4,713 | 17.6 | +8.0 |
| Total formal votes | | 26,757 | 97.7 | |
| Informal votes | | 545 | 2.3 | |
| Turnout | | 27,302 | 92.2 | |
Two-party-preferred result
| Liberal National | Andrew Powell | 13,860 | 55.8 | +5.8 |
| Labor | Jenny Hansen Read | 10,975 | 44.2 | −5.8 |
| Liberal National hold | | Swing | +5.8 | |

2006 Queensland state election: Glass House
| Party | Candidate | Votes | % | ±% |
|---|---|---|---|---|
| Labor | Carolyn Male | 13,418 | 48.4 | −0.4 |
| National | Ken Piva | 9,834 | 35.4 | +2.0 |
| Greens | Roger Callen | 2,966 | 10.7 | +2.3 |
| Family First | Justin Blowes | 1,524 | 5.5 | +5.5 |
| Total formal votes | | 27,742 | 97.7 | −0.3 |
| Informal votes | | 657 | 2.3 | +0.3 |
| Turnout | | 28,399 | 91.5 | −0.9 |
Two-party-preferred result
| Labor | Carolyn Male | 14,830 | 57.7 | −1.2 |
| National | Ken Piva | 10,880 | 42.3 | +1.2 |
| Labor hold | | Swing | −1.2 | |

2004 Queensland state election: Glass House
| Party | Candidate | Votes | % | ±% |
|---|---|---|---|---|
| Labor | Carolyn Male | 13,003 | 48.8 | +8.0 |
| National | John Longhurst | 8,907 | 33.4 | +15.4 |
| One Nation | Santo Ferraro | 2,481 | 9.3 | −11.1 |
| Greens | Eve Scopes | 2,250 | 8.4 | +1.8 |
| Total formal votes | | 26,641 | 98.0 | −0.2 |
| Informal votes | | 551 | 2.0 | +0.2 |
| Turnout | | 27,192 | 92.4 | −1.1 |
Two-party-preferred result
| Labor | Carolyn Male | 14,540 | 58.9 | −0.7 |
| National | John Longhurst | 10,128 | 41.1 | +0.7 |
| Labor hold | | Swing | −0.7 | |

2001 Queensland state election: Glass House
| Party | Candidate | Votes | % | ±% |
|---|---|---|---|---|
| Labor | Carolyn Male | 9,989 | 40.8 | +9.8 |
| One Nation | Santo Ferraro | 4,993 | 20.4 | −9.6 |
| National | Greg Chippendale | 4,408 | 18.0 | −4.6 |
| Liberal | Debbie Taylor | 2,612 | 10.7 | +4.9 |
| Greens | Dianne Cannon | 1,628 | 6.6 | +5.2 |
| City Country Alliance | Martin Janke | 867 | 3.5 | +3.5 |
| Total formal votes | | 24,497 | 98.2 | |
| Informal votes | | 439 | 1.8 | |
| Turnout | | 24,936 | 93.5 | |
Two-party-preferred result
| Labor | Carolyn Male | 11,598 | 59.6 | +13.9 |
| National | Greg Chippendale | 7,869 | 40.4 | −13.9 |
| Labor gain from National | | Swing | +13.9 | |

=== Elections in the 1980s ===
1989 Queensland state election: Glass House
| Party | Candidate | Votes | % | ±% |
|---|---|---|---|---|
| Labor | Jon Sullivan | 11,617 | 47.2 | +9.8 |
| National | Bill Newton | 6,593 | 26.8 | −19.8 |
| Liberal | Errol Johnston | 4,958 | 20.2 | +7.5 |
| Call to Australia | Rona Joyner | 872 | 3.5 | +3.5 |
| Democrats | Glen Spicer | 567 | 2.3 | −0.9 |
| Total formal votes | | 24,607 | 96.0 | −0.9 |
| Informal votes | | 1,034 | 4.0 | +0.9 |
| Turnout | | 25,641 | 92.4 | +0.2 |
Two-party-preferred result
| Labor | Jon Sullivan | 12,704 | 51.6 | +8.5 |
| National | Bill Newton | 11,903 | 48.4 | −8.5 |
| Labor gain from National | | Swing | +8.5 | |

1986 Queensland state election: Glass House
| Party | Candidate | Votes | % | ±% |
|---|---|---|---|---|
| National | Bill Newton | 8,563 | 46.6 | |
| Labor | Lloyd Barr | 6,875 | 37.4 | |
| Liberal | Ernie McEntee | 2,334 | 12.7 | |
| Democrats | Glen Spicer | 596 | 3.2 | |
| Total formal votes | | 18,368 | 96.9 | |
| Informal votes | | 583 | 3.1 | |
| Turnout | | 18,951 | 92.2 | |
Two-party-preferred result
| National | Bill Newton | 10,456 | 56.9 | +0.9 |
| Labor | Lloyd Barr | 7,912 | 43.1 | −0.9 |
| National hold | | Swing | +0.9 | |
