= Electoral results for the district of Merrimac =

Queensland, Australia, district election results

This is a list of electoral results for the electoral district of Merrimac in Queensland state elections.

== Members for Merrimac ==
Member	Party	Term
Bob Quinn	Liberal Party	1992–2001

== Election results ==
=== Elections in the 1990s ===
1998 Queensland state election: Merrimac
Party	Candidate	Votes	%	±%
Liberal	Bob Quinn	11,093	49.11	−16.32
Labor	Robert Poole	6,405	28.36	−6.21
One Nation	John Fairfax	4,487	19.87	+19.87
Democrats	Colin O'Brien	601	2.66	+2.66
Total formal votes		22,586	98.19	+0.40
Informal votes		417	1.81	−0.40
Turnout		23,003	89.68	+1.71
Two-party-preferred result
Liberal	Bob Quinn	13,424	64.69	−0.74
Labor	Robert Poole	7,327	35.31	+0.74
Liberal hold		Swing	−0.74	

1995 Queensland state election: Merrimac
Party	Candidate	Votes	%	±%
Liberal	Bob Quinn	13,200	65.43	+32.32
Labor	Matthew Loader	6,974	34.57	−1.03
Total formal votes		20,174	97.79	−0.20
Informal votes		456	2.21	+0.20
Turnout		20,630	87.97	+0.14
Liberal hold		Swing	+4.89	

1992 Queensland state election: Merrimac
Party	Candidate	Votes	%	±%
Labor	Mark Whillans	6,605	35.6	+1.0
Liberal	Bob Quinn	6,143	33.1	+0.9
National	Les Mole	4,953	26.7	−2.7
Confederate Action	Colin Smith	851	4.6	+4.6
Total formal votes		18,552	98.0	
Informal votes		380	2.0	
Turnout		18,932	87.8	
Two-party-preferred result
Liberal	Bob Quinn	10,656	60.5	−1.6
Labor	Mark Whillans	6,945	39.5	+1.6
Liberal hold		Swing	−1.6	
