= Electoral district of Chermside =

Former state electoral district of Queensland, Australia

Chermside Queensland—Legislative Assembly
- State: Queensland
- Dates current: 1950-1960, 1992-2001
- Namesake: Chermside, Queensland

Chermside was the name of two incarnations of an electoral district of the Legislative Assembly in the Australian state of Queensland.

Both districts were based in the north-eastern suburbs of Brisbane and named for the suburb of Chermside. The first existed from 1950 to 1960 and the second from 1992 to 2001.

== Members for Chermside ==
First incarnation (1950–1960)
Member	Party	Term
Alex Dewar	Liberal	1950–1960
Second incarnation (1992–2001)
Member	Party	Term
Terry Sullivan	Labor	1992–2001

== See also ==
- Electoral districts of Queensland
- Members of the Queensland Legislative Assembly by year
- Category:Members of the Queensland Legislative Assembly by name
