= Ken Hayward =

Australian politician

Ken Hayward OAM

Member of the Queensland Legislative Assembly for Caboolture
- In office 1 November 1986 – 19 September 1992
- Preceded by: Bill Newton
- Succeeded by: Jon Sullivan

Member of the Queensland Legislative Assembly for Kallangur
- In office 19 September 1992 – 21 March 2009
- Preceded by: New seat
- Succeeded by: Mary-Anne O'Neill

Personal details
- Born: Kenneth William Hayward; 13 February 1954 (age 72) Cairns, Queensland
- Party: Labor
- Occupation: Principal at Chequers Financial Services Australia Owner at FNQ Accounting, Tully
- Profession: Chartered Accountant

Kenneth William Hayward OAM (born 13 February 1954 in Cairns) was an Australian politician and is the current Principal of Chequers Financial Services Australia and Owner of FNQ Accounting, Tully. He was a Labor member of the Legislative Assembly of Queensland from 1986 to 2009.

Hayward entered state parliament after winning the seat of Caboolture at the 1986 state election. He switched to the district of Kallangur at the 1992 state election, holding the seat until his retirement in 2009.

After Labor came to government under the leadership of Wayne Goss at the 1989 state election, Hayward served as chairman of the Public Accounts Committee from March 1990 to December 1991. He later became a minister under Goss, holding several portfolios. He was the Minister for Health from December 1991 to February 1995. Thereafter, he was the Minister for Transport and the Minister Assisting the Premier on Economic and Trade Development from February to July 1995. Finally, he was the Minister for Business, Industry and Regional Development from July 1995 until the fall of the Goss government in February 1996.

Despite the Labor Party returning to government at the 1998 state election, Hayward never again served as a minister. Instead, he served as chairman of the Public Accounts Committee from July 1998 to January 2004, chair of the Scrutiny of Legislation Committee from March 2004 to August 2006 and finally as chair of the Public Accounts Committee from October 2006 until his retirement in February 2009.

== Post Parliamentary career ==
Kenneth Hayward is a registered tax agent and the principal of Chequers Financial Services, a Chartered Accounting firm based in Lutwhyche, Queensland. Ken is also the principal of FNQ Accounting, an accounting practice located, in Tully Far North Queensland.

Hayward was awarded the Medal of the Order of Australia in the 2023 King's Birthday Honours for "service to the people and Parliament of Queensland".

Parliament of Queensland
Preceded by Bill Newton	Member for Caboolture; 1986 – 1992	Succeeded by Jon Sullivan
New seat	Member for Kallangur; 1992 – 2009	Succeeded by Mary-Anne O'Neill
