= Electoral district of Merrimac =

Former state electoral district of Queensland, Australia

Merrimac Queensland—Legislative Assembly
- State: Queensland
- Created: 1992
- Abolished: 2001
- Namesake: Merrimac, Queensland

Merrimac was an electoral district of the Legislative Assembly in the Australian state of Queensland from 1992 to 2001.

The district was based in the Gold Coast and named for the suburb of Merrimac.

== Members for Merrimac ==
Member	Party	Term
Bob Quinn	Liberal	19 Sep 1992 – 17 Feb 2001

== See also ==
- Electoral districts of Queensland
- Members of the Queensland Legislative Assembly by year
- Category:Members of the Queensland Legislative Assembly by name
