= Confederate Action Party of Australia =

Confederate Action Party
- Abbreviation: CAP
- Founded: July 1990; 34 years ago
- Registered: 10 September 1992
- Dissolved: 29 July 1993; 31 years ago
- Headquarters: Toowoomba, Queensland
- Membership (1993): c. 2,500 (Note: Estimate made in A History of the Australian Extreme right Since 1950 (Thesis). University of Western Sydney. 2002.)
- Ideology: Anti-socialism; Right-wing populism
- Political position: Right-wing
- Colors: Green
- Slogan: "One Flag, One Nation."

The Confederate Action Party of Australia (CAP) was an Australian far-right political party which first appeared in the 1992 Queensland state election. Its 12 candidates polled an average of 10.13% in the seats they contested. Overall, CAP achieved 1.4% of the statewide vote and did not win any seats. The party was registered on 10 September 1992 with the Australian Electoral Commission and contested the 1993 Australian federal election in a number of states. It was deregistered on 29 July 1993. and collapsed in August 1993 amid allegations of financial impropriety, vote rigging, infighting and fraud.

Tony Pitt, one of the party’s candidates, became the secretary of One Nation’s Maryborough branch. Another CAP candidate, Bruce Whiteside, founded the Pauline Hanson Support Movement in 1996, which was used by Hanson to establish One Nation in April 1997. Santo Ferraro, the CAP’s candidate in the 1993 federal election, then stood in a number of elections for One Nation.

== Policy ==
The party was often accused of extremism and racism. It advocated the return of the death penalty, denial of all applications for political asylum, and the reintroduction of the use of convict labour. The party sometimes used the slogan "We are One Australia – One Nation".

== Tony Pitt ==
In 1991 Pitt had circulated a letter to far-right extremists which claimed that Australia was about to be deliberately destroyed. "The ALP is going to spring an early election," he wrote. "The Coalition is going to deliberately throw the fight so their ALP cohorts can maintain progress on the plan the upper levels of the Libs and the ALP have in mind for us." Pitt attached a list of "organisations who will help to save us", which included the League of Rights, Australians Against Further Immigration, the AUSI Freedom Scouts, the Libyan backed and funded Australian Peoples’ Conference, the Citizens Electoral Council, and the Queensland Immigration Control Association, a division of the National Front of Australia. An updated version of this contact list - now including the neo-Nazi group National Action - is found on Pitt’s website.

Pitt has also advocated the use of biological and atomic weapons against Asians, and in March 1993 told SBS TV’s Dateline program that he would put politicians on trial, after purging judges and police - "a filthy corrupt mob". His most recent claim is that the Port Arthur gunman, Martin Bryant, was drugged and set up by anti-gun lobbyists to kill his 35 victims.

== Federal parliament ==
House of Representatives
Election year	# of overall votes	% of overall vote	# of overall seats won	+/–
1993	60,213	0.57(#6/14)	0 / 150	▲0

Senate
Election year	# of overall votes	% of overall vote	# of overall seats won	# of overall seats	+/–	Notes
1993	59,875	0.56 (#7/18)	0 / 40	0 / 76	▲0	

=== State elections ===
Queensland assembly
Election year	# of overall votes	% of overall vote	# of overall seats won	# of overall seats	+/–	Notes
1992	23,510	1.35% (#4/7)	0 / 89	0 / 89	▲0	
1995	9,329	0.52% (#6/6)	0 / 89	0 / 89	▼0	
