= Electoral district of Caboolture =

Former state electoral district of Queensland, Australia

Caboolture Queensland—Legislative Assembly
- State: Queensland
- Created: 1977
- Abolished: 2001
- Coordinates: 27°04′45.5″S 152°56′42″E

Caboolture was an electoral district of the Legislative Assembly in the Australian state of Queensland. It existed from 1977 to 2001 and centred on the community of Caboolture between Brisbane and the Sunshine Coast.

== Members for Caboolture ==
Member	Party	Term
Des Frawley	National	1977–1983
Bill Newton	National	1983–1986
Ken Hayward	Labor	1986–1992
Jon Sullivan	Labor	1992–1998
Bill Feldman	One Nation	1998–1999
Bill Feldman	City Country Alliance	1999–2001

== See also ==
- Electoral districts of Queensland
- Members of the Queensland Legislative Assembly by year
- Category:Members of the Queensland Legislative Assembly by name
