= Bill Newton (politician) =

Australian politician

Member of the Queensland Legislative Assembly for Caboolture
- In office 22 October 1983 – 1 November 1986
- Preceded by: Des Frawley
- Succeeded by: Ken Hayward

Member of the Queensland Legislative Assembly for Glass House
- In office 1 November 1986 – 2 December 1989
- Preceded by: New seat
- Succeeded by: Jon Sullivan

Personal details
- Born: Lyell Edward Newton; 29 July 1935 Brisbane, Queensland, Australia
- Died: 2 August 2015 (aged 80) Caboolture, Queensland, Australia
- Party: National Party
- Spouse: Margaret Anne Goymer
- Occupation: Grazier, Fruit farmer

Lyell Edward "Bill" Newton (29 July 1935 – 2 August 2015) was an Australian politician. He was a Member of the Queensland Legislative Assembly.

== Early life ==
Newton was born in Brisbane to Edward Charles Newton and Lily Alice, née Zanow. He attended state school at Morayfield before becoming a fruit farmer and grazier in Rocksberg.

== Politics ==
Newton was a member of the National Party, and served as Chairman of the Caboolture branch from 1963 to 1983. In that year he was elected to the Queensland Legislative Assembly as the member for Caboolture; at the following election in 1986 he transferred to Glass House, but in 1989 he was defeated.

== Later life ==
Newton died on 2 August 2015 at Caboolture.

Parliament of Queensland
Preceded by Des Frawley	Member for Caboolture; 1983–1986	Succeeded by Ken Hayward
New seat	Member for Glass House; 1986–1989	Succeeded by Jon Sullivan
