= Jon Sullivan =

Australian politician (1950–2021)

Member of the Australian Parliament for Longman
- In office 24 November 2007 – 21 August 2010
- Preceded by: Mal Brough
- Succeeded by: Wyatt Roy

Member of the Queensland Parliament for Glass House
- In office 2 December 1989 – 19 September 1992
- Preceded by: Bill Newton
- Succeeded by: Electorate abolished

Member of the Queensland Parliament for Caboolture
- In office 19 September 1992 – 13 June 1998
- Preceded by: Ken Hayward
- Succeeded by: Bill Feldman

Personal details
- Born: 10 November 1950 Bulli, New South Wales, Australia
- Died: 17 January 2021 (aged 70)
- Party: Australian Labor Party
- Spouse: Carryn Sullivan

Jonathan Harold Sullivan (10 November 1950 – 17 January 2021) was an Australian politician who served as a member of the Australian House of Representatives from 2007 to 2010, representing the seat of Longman for the Australian Labor Party. He had also previously served as a member of the Legislative Assembly of Queensland from 1989 to 1998, representing the seat of Glass House from 1989 to 1992, and Caboolture from 1992 to 1998.

Sullivan won the seat of Longman for the Labor Party from the Liberal Party at the 2007 federal election. Sullivan defeated government minister Mal Brough. It was one of a number of Labor gains at that election which propelled the party from opposition to government. However, the seat was returned to the Liberal National Party of Queensland at the 2010 election, when Sullivan was defeated by 20-year-old candidate, Wyatt Roy.

In the closing week of the 2010 federal election campaign, Sullivan gained national media attention due to a gaffe where he criticised the father of a seven-year-old child with a disability for waiting two years on a Queensland Health waiting list. Sullivan apologised to the father and his family.

Before entering federal politics, Sullivan was a member of the Legislative Assembly of Queensland. He was the Labor member for Caboolture from 1989 to 1998. He lost the seat to Bill Feldman, the One Nation candidate at the 1998 Queensland state election.

His wife, Carryn Sullivan, also an Australian politician, was also a member of the Legislative Assembly of Queensland, representing between 2001 and 2012 the seat of Pumicestone for Labor.

Parliament of Queensland
Preceded by Bill Newton	Member for Glass House; 1989–1992	District abolished
Preceded by Ken Hayward	Member for Caboolture; 1992–1998	Succeeded by Bill Feldman
Parliament of Australia
Preceded by Mal Brough	Member for Longman; 2007–2010	Succeeded by Wyatt Roy
