= Electoral results for the district of Redlands =

Queensland, Australia, district election results

This is a list of electoral results for the electoral district of Redlands in Queensland state elections.

== Members for Redlands ==
Member	Party	Term
Ted Baldwin	Labor	1972–1974
John Goleby	Country	1974–1974
John Goleby	National	1974–1985
Paul Clauson	National	1985–1989
Darryl Briskey	Labor	1989–1992
John Budd	Labor	1992–1995
John Hegarty	National	1995–2001
John English	Labor	2001–2009
Peter Dowling	Liberal National	2009–2015
Matt McEachan	Liberal National	2015–2017
Kim Richards	Labor	2017–2024
Rebecca Young	Liberal National	2024–present

== Election results ==
=== Elections in the 2020s ===
2024 Queensland state election: Redlands
Party	Candidate	Votes	%	±%
Liberal National	Rebecca Young	15,537	42.43	+4.33
Labor	Kim Richards	13,848	37.81	−5.69
Greens	Kristie Lockhart	2,495	6.81	−0.39
One Nation	Gary Williamson	2,036	5.56	+1.36
Legalise Cannabis	Suzanne Spierenburg	1,537	4.20	+0.70
Family First	Marita Neville	667	1.82	+1.82
Animal Justice	Liela D'Rose	503	1.37	+1.37
Total formal votes		36,623	95.87	
Informal votes		1,576	4.13	
Turnout		38,199	90.05	
Two-party-preferred result
Liberal National	Rebecca Young	19,005	51.89	+5.79
Labor	Kim Richards	17,618	48.11	−5.79
Liberal National gain from Labor		Swing	+5.79	

2020 Queensland state election: Redlands
Party	Candidate	Votes	%	±%
Labor	Kim Richards	14,211	43.51	+11.22
Liberal National	Henry Pike	12,457	38.14	+6.37
Greens	Carmen McNaught	2,360	7.22	−1.28
One Nation	Peter Williams	1,356	4.15	−13.56
Legalise Cannabis	Frank Brady	1,132	3.47	+3.47
Informed Medical Options	Michelle Maher	494	1.51	+1.51
Shooters, Fishers, Farmers	Andrew Pope	442	1.35	+1.35
United Australia	Craig Gunnis	213	0.65	+0.65
Total formal votes		32,665	96.55	+0.57
Informal votes		1,167	3.45	−0.57
Turnout		33,832	89.89	+0.53
Two-party-preferred result
Labor	Kim Richards	17,606	53.90	+0.84
Liberal National	Henry Pike	15,059	46.10	−0.84
Labor hold		Swing	+0.84	

=== Elections in the 2010s ===
2017 Queensland state election: Redlands
Party	Candidate	Votes	%	±%
Labor	Kim Richards	9,591	32.3	−3.3
Liberal National	Matt McEachan	9,435	31.8	−11.5
One Nation	Jason Quick	5,262	17.7	+17.7
Independent	Peter Dowling	2,889	9.7	+9.7
Greens	David Keogh	2,527	8.5	+0.8
Total formal votes		29,704	96.0	−1.7
Informal votes		1,243	4.0	+1.7
Turnout		30,947	89.4	+3.0
Two-party-preferred result
Labor	Kim Richards	15,760	53.1	+4.3
Liberal National	Matt McEachan	13,944	46.9	−4.3
Labor gain from Liberal National		Swing	+4.3	

2015 Queensland state election: Redlands
Party	Candidate	Votes	%	±%
Liberal National	Matt McEachan	13,340	43.86	−21.94
Labor	Deborah Kellie	10,442	34.33	+10.28
Greens	David Keogh	2,261	7.43	−2.72
Independent	Sheena Hewlett	1,939	6.37	+6.37
Palmer United	Susan Bylett	1,809	5.95	+5.95
Family First	Carolyn Ferrando	625	2.05	+2.05
Total formal votes		30,416	97.67	+0.10
Informal votes		726	2.33	−0.10
Turnout		31,142	91.52	−0.64
Two-party-preferred result
Liberal National	Matt McEachan	14,399	52.23	−18.87
Labor	Deborah Kellie	13,167	47.77	+18.87
Liberal National hold		Swing	−18.87	

2012 Queensland state election: Redlands
Party	Candidate	Votes	%	±%
Liberal National	Peter Dowling	17,849	65.80	+21.08
Labor	Peter Seage	6,524	24.05	−18.97
Greens	David Keogh	2,753	10.15	+4.91
Total formal votes		27,126	97.57	−0.41
Informal votes		675	2.43	+0.41
Turnout		27,801	92.16	+0.08
Two-party-preferred result
Liberal National	Peter Dowling	18,381	71.10	+21.03
Labor	Peter Seage	7,471	28.90	−21.03
Liberal National hold		Swing	+21.03	

=== Elections in the 2000s ===
2009 Queensland state election: Redlands
Party	Candidate	Votes	%	±%
Liberal National	Peter Dowling	11,356	44.7	+9.9
Labor	John English	10,923	43.0	−6.7
Greens	Colin Nightingale	1,330	5.2	−1.9
Independent	Mark Edwards	1,066	4.2	+4.2
DS4SEQ	Cameron Crook	435	1.7	+1.7
Independent	Heather Steinberg	283	1.1	+1.1
Total formal votes		25,393	97.6	
Informal votes		523	2.4	
Turnout		25,916	92.1	
Two-party-preferred result
Liberal National	Peter Dowling	11,984	50.1	+6.8
Labor	John English	11,950	49.9	−6.8
Liberal National gain from Labor		Swing	+6.8	

2006 Queensland state election: Redlands
Party	Candidate	Votes	%	±%
Labor	John English	13,416	49.7	−3.7
National	Russell Biddle	9,295	34.4	−2.3
Independent	John Hegarty	2,349	8.7	+8.7
Greens	Brad Scott	1,931	7.2	+2.3
Total formal votes		26,991	97.9	−0.3
Informal votes		577	2.1	+0.3
Turnout		27,568	91.1	−2.1
Two-party-preferred result
Labor	John English	14,433	56.9	−1.6
National	Russell Biddle	10,925	43.1	+1.6
Labor hold		Swing	−1.6	

2004 Queensland state election: Redlands
Party	Candidate	Votes	%	±%
Labor	John English	13,320	53.4	+4.8
National	John Hegarty	9,137	36.7	+7.5
One Nation	John Walter	1,258	5.0	+5.0
Greens	Lyndon Harris	1,215	4.9	+4.9
Total formal votes		24,930	98.2	+0.9
Informal votes		467	1.8	−0.9
Turnout		25,397	93.2	−1.1
Two-party-preferred result
Labor	John English	13,900	58.5	+1.6
National	John Hegarty	9,876	41.5	−1.6
Labor hold		Swing	+1.6	

2001 Queensland state election: Redlands
Party	Candidate	Votes	%	±%
Labor	John English	10,797	48.6	+9.8
National	John Hegarty	6,500	29.2	−2.1
Independent	John Burns	3,210	14.4	+14.4
City Country Alliance	Susan Hancock	1,731	7.8	+7.8
Total formal votes		22,238	97.3	
Informal votes		611	2.7	
Turnout		22,849	94.3	
Two-party-preferred result
Labor	John English	11,494	56.9	+7.5
National	John Hegarty	8,721	43.1	−7.5
Labor gain from National		Swing	+7.5	

=== Elections in the 1990s ===
1998 Queensland state election: Redlands
Party	Candidate	Votes	%	±%
Labor	John Budd	10,226	38.5	−2.2
National	John Hegarty	8,703	32.8	−13.0
One Nation	June Woodward	6,234	23.5	+23.5
Democrats	Graham Jenkin	1,092	4.1	−4.5
Reform	Don Ruwoldt	302	1.1	+1.1
Total formal votes		26,557	98.5	+0.2
Informal votes		416	1.5	−0.2
Turnout		26,973	94.0	+1.0
Two-party-preferred result
National	John Hegarty	12,652	51.0	−3.6
Labor	John Budd	12,165	49.0	+3.6
National hold		Swing	−3.6	

1995 Queensland state election: Redlands
Party	Candidate	Votes	%	±%
National	John Hegarty	10,653	45.8	+17.7
Labor	John Budd	9,484	40.7	−9.0
Democrats	Jenny Van Rooyen	2,014	8.7	+8.7
Independent	Rosemary Skelly	1,132	4.9	+4.9
Total formal votes		23,283	98.3	+0.7
Informal votes		405	1.7	−0.7
Turnout		23,688	93.0	
Two-party-preferred result
National	John Hegarty	12,447	54.6	+9.8
Labor	John Budd	10,353	45.4	−9.8
National gain from Labor		Swing	+9.8	

1992 Queensland state election: Redlands
Party	Candidate	Votes	%	±%
Labor	John Budd	9,909	49.8	+1.0
National	Paul Clauson	5,596	28.1	+3.5
Liberal	Mike Jones	3,240	16.3	−5.3
Independent	Rick Pisera	611	3.1	+3.1
Independent	Charles Connelly	556	2.8	+2.8
Total formal votes		19,912	97.6	
Informal votes		491	2.4	
Turnout		20,403	92.2	
Two-party-preferred result
Labor	John Budd	10,622	55.2	−0.8
National	Paul Clauson	8,604	44.8	+0.8
Labor hold		Swing	−0.8	

=== Elections in the 1980s ===
1989 Queensland state election: Redlands
Party	Candidate	Votes	%	±%
Labor	Darryl Briskey	11,750	48.9	+9.1
National	Paul Clauson	6,024	25.1	−16.5
Liberal	Edward Santagiuliana	4,982	20.7	
Democrats	Geoffrey Speakman	978	4.1	+1.2
Independent	Leo Grace	297	1.2	+1.2
Total formal votes		24,031	97.8	−0.6
Informal votes		534	2.2	+0.6
Turnout		24,565	92.9	+0.1
Two-party-preferred result
Labor	Darryl Briskey	13,505	56.2	+10.0
National	Paul Clauson	10,526	43.8	−10.0
Labor gain from National		Swing	+10.0	

1986 Queensland state election: Redlands
Party	Candidate	Votes	%	±%
National	Paul Clauson	7,716	41.6	−4.4
Labor	Graeme Kinnear	7,367	39.8	−1.6
Liberal	Martin Shepherd	2,918	15.8	+9.6
Democrats	Richard May	530	2.9	−3.5
Total formal votes		18,531	98.4	
Informal votes		297	1.6	
Turnout		18,828	92.8	
Two-party-preferred result
National	Paul Clauson	9,975	53.8	−5.0
Labor	Graeme Kinnear	8,556	46.2	+5.0
National hold		Swing	−5.0	

1985 Redlands state by-election
Party	Candidate	Votes	%	±%
Labor	Con Sciacca	12,650	43.28	+1.88
National	Paul Clauson	10,877	37.21	–8.78
Liberal	Max Bolte	4,169	14.26	+7.85
Democrats	Richard May	991	3.39	–2.81
Independent	Bernard Irving	366	1.25	+1.25
Anti-Hashish Labor Party	Thomas Aeon-Masterson	106	0.36	+0.36
Union Solidarity Party	Jackson Brown	72	0.25	+0.25
Total formal votes		29,231	98.28	–0.36
Informal votes		513	1.72	+0.36
Turnout		29,744	90.75	–2.05
Two-party-preferred result
National	Paul Clauson	14,722	50.36	–3.51
Labor	Con Sciacca	14,508	49.64	+3.51
National hold		Swing	–3.51	

1983 Queensland state election: Redlands
Party	Candidate	Votes	%	±%
National	John Goleby	12,194	46.0	+3.6
Labor	Andrew Mellis	10,977	41.4	+0.7
Democrats	Kath Walker	1,700	6.4	+6.4
Liberal	Ken Eastwell	1,643	6.2	−10.7
Total formal votes		26,514	98.6	−0.3
Informal votes		365	1.4	+0.3
Turnout		26,879	92.8	+1.9
Two-party-preferred result
National	John Goleby	14,332	54.0	−0.2
Labor	Andrew Mellis	12,182	46.0	+0.2
National hold		Swing	−0.2	

1980 Queensland state election: Redlands
Party	Candidate	Votes	%	±%
National	John Goleby	8,836	42.4	+0.5
Labor	Con Sciacca	8,477	40.7	−0.7
Liberal	Peter Hunter	3,520	16.9	+0.2
Total formal votes		20,833	98.9	+0.3
Informal votes		236	1.1	−0.3
Turnout		21,069	90.9	−1.9
Two-party-preferred result
National	John Goleby	11,300	54.2	−1.2
Labor	Con Sciacca	9,533	45.8	+1.2
National hold		Swing	−1.2	

=== Elections in the 1970s ===
1977 Queensland state election: Redlands
Party	Candidate	Votes	%	±%
National	John Goleby	6,436	41.9	+10.1
Labor	Con Sciacca	6,350	41.4	+5.0
Liberal	Peter Hunter	2,558	16.7	−14.0
Total formal votes		15,344	98.6	
Informal votes		224	1.4	
Turnout		15,568	92.8	
Two-party-preferred result
National	John Goleby	8,499	55.4	−4.8
Labor	Con Sciacca	6,845	44.6	+4.8
National hold		Swing	−4.8	

1974 Queensland state election: Redlands
Party	Candidate	Votes	%	±%
Labor	Ted Baldwin	7,357	36.4	−15.2
National	John Goleby	6,430	31.8	+7.5
Liberal	Brian Dee	6,207	30.7	+10.3
Queensland Labor	Peter McMahon	228	1.1	−2.5
Total formal votes		20,222	98.4	+0.1
Informal votes		321	1.6	−0.1
Turnout		20,543	88.7	−2.6
Two-party-preferred result
National	John Goleby	12,075	59.7	+14.8
Labor	Ted Baldwin	8,147	40.3	−14.8
National gain from Labor		Swing	+14.8	

1972 Queensland state election: Redlands
Party	Candidate	Votes	%	±%
Labor	Ted Baldwin	6,929	51.6	+2.4
Country	Dick Wood	3,271	24.3	−19.2
Liberal	Edward Fitzgerald	2,746	20.4	+20.4
Queensland Labor	Kenneth Bayliss	486	3.6	−3.7
Total formal votes		13,432	98.3	
Informal votes		229	1.7	
Turnout		13,661	91.3	
Two-party-preferred result
Labor	Ted Baldwin	7,395	55.1	+2.0
Country	Dick Wood	6,037	44.9	−2.0
Labor hold		Swing	+2.0	
