= LGBTQ rights in Queensland =

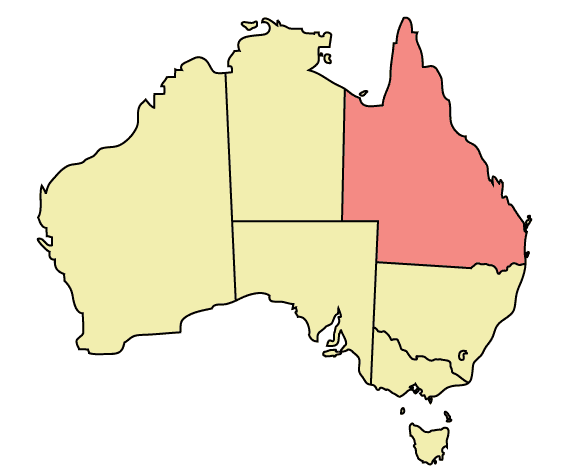
- Queensland (Australia)
- Legal status: Always legal for women; legal since 1991 for men: Equal age of consent since 2016
- Gender identity: Change of sex marker on birth certificate does not require sex reassignment surgery since 2024
- Discrimination protections: Yes (state law since 2002; under federal law since 2013)

Family rights
- Recognition of relationships: State law: De facto relationships since 2002; Civil partnerships since 2012 (Note: Between June 2012 and April 2016 civil partnerships were replaced with "registered relationships", which were introduced by the Liberal National Party of Queensland to remove official ceremonies among other changes; see §Recognition of same-sex relationships – Newman Government for details): Federal law: De facto relationships since 2009; Same-sex marriage since 2017
- Adoption: Full LGBT adoption rights since 2016

Lesbian, gay, bisexual, transgender, and queer (LGBTQ) rights in Queensland have advanced significantly from the late 20th century onwards, in line with progress on LGBTQ rights in Australia nationally.

Private consensual sex between men has been legal in the state since 1991, with lesbian sexual acts never criminalised. The age of consent was equalised to 16 years for all sexual acts in 2016. Sexuality and gender identity are protected attributes under both state and federal anti-discrimination laws. Same-sex couples may marry under Australian law, enter into a civil partnership under state law or live together in an unregistered de facto relationship. Same-sex couples may become parents through adoption, foster care, altruistic surrogacy and, for lesbian couples, IVF. In 2020, Queensland became the first jurisdiction within Australia to pass a law banning conversion therapy, with a maximum penalty of 18 months imprisonment and fines. State anti-discrimination protections for sexuality and gender identity were introduced in 2002 and in 2017 the gay panic defence was abolished from the criminal law. Transgender and intersex Queenslanders are able to update their government records and birth certificate, with the formal repeal of both the "divorce requirements" in 2018 and then the "surgery requirements" in 2024.

LGBTQ rights have been politically polarised: the Queensland branch of the Australian Labor Party supported the decriminalisation of homosexual sex and anti-discrimination protections as early as 1981 and have introduced various legal reforms when in power, while the socially conservative Liberal National Party of Queensland and its predecessor the National Party has traditionally been more hostile. Queensland has historically been Australia's most conservative state, concentrated in the decentralised regional/rural areas to the north and west of the metropolitan south-east corner, but the impact of social conservatism on Queensland politics and laws has declined significantly in the 21st century. The highest proportion of Queensland same-sex couples are concentrated in Brisbane's inner-city suburbs, with the top three being New Farm, Fortitude Valley and Teneriffe.

Same-sex marriage has been legal in the state since December 2017, after passage of the Marriage Amendment (Definition and Religious Freedoms) Act 2017 in the Australian Parliament. The 2017 Australian Marriage Law Postal Survey, designed to gauge public support for same-sex marriage in Australia, returned a 60.7% "Yes" response in Queensland. The Brisbane and Griffith electorates returned the sixth and eighth highest percentages of ‘Yes’ votes in Australia out of 150 electorates. 2019 polling on gay rights consistently showed that even in regional areas, Queensland is no more conservative about the subject than any other states.

== Laws regarding sexual activity ==
Initially inherited from the British Empire, anti-homosexuality laws were retained by Queensland from 1895 until their repeal in 1991, while lesbian activity was always legal. Queensland's age of consent for all forms of sex is 16, since the age of consent for anal sex was lowered from 18 years to 16 years in 2016. Queensland was the last Australian jurisdiction to equalise its age of consent. A proposal to expunge the criminal records of men convicted of consensual homosexual acts was passed in 2017. The historical developments are considered further below.

=== Historical persecution ===
As with other former British colonies, Queensland originally derived its criminal law from the United Kingdom. This included the prohibition of "buggery" and "gross indecency" between males. (Note: "Buggery" was the British term for anal sex, while gross indecency referred to other homosexual behaviour where anal sex could not be proven, such as oral sex and mutual masturbation.) Similarly to the United Kingdom, lesbianism was never criminalised under Queensland law. A review of Queensland homosexual convictions between 1860 and 1954 revealed that judges tended to hand down sentences that, while still harsh, were at the lenient end of the scale.

The release of the Wolfenden Report in the United Kingdom in 1957 marked the beginning of a change in official attitudes in the English-speaking world, with its recommendation that homosexuality be decriminalised. Homosexual sex was legalised in England and Wales in 1967.

While other states in Australia began to liberalise their anti-homosexuality laws in the 1970s and 1980s, Queensland was ruled by the socially conservative National Party of Joh Bjelke-Petersen. His government actively used homophobia for electoral advantage, linking it to paedophilia and presenting it as morally deviant. At this time government policy was uniformly hostile; the Education Department refused to offer teaching work to openly gay men such as George Weir and in 1985 the government passed an amendment to the Liquor Act making it an offence for publicans to serve alcohol to "perverts, deviants, child molesters and drug users" or to allow them to remain on licensed premises. The Bjelke-Petersen Government intended that the new licensing law be used to refuse service to homosexuals. Although lesbianism was never criminalised directly, women could still be targeted by Bjelke-Petersen's "homosexual deviance" laws that allowed proprietors to call the police on patrons suspected of being lesbian. The 1970s also saw the beginning of a local gay rights movement, with meetings held at the 379 Club on George Street and the local chapter of the Campaign Against Moral Persecution launched in 1971.

Anti-homosexuality laws were enforced by police throughout the 1980s, including against men who were in same-sex relationships and were not aware that their private conduct was illegal. National Party politicians of the time such as Queensland minister Geoff Muntz and federal leader Ian Sinclair made their anti-gay views well known, with the latter claiming that the Labor Party's failure to condemn homosexuality was helping the spread of the newly discovered HIV. In 1987 then-Justice Minister Paul Clauson proposed extending the "gross indecency" offences to cover lesbians as well, but this was abandoned as enforcement would be impossible.

Fear of HIV and AIDS were at their height in the 1980s, with at least 45 positive AIDS tests and six deaths in Queensland by 1985. Then Health Minister at the time Brian Austin sought to relax some of the state morality laws, such as the ban on condom vending machines, but was overruled by the Cabinet. Instead the Bjelke-Petersen Government used the fear caused by HIV/AIDS infection of the blood supply to increase homophobic sentiment and demonise LGBT people further.

The first major public demonstration in favour of decriminalisation occurred on 31 August 1989, when several hundred people demonstrated outside Parliament House in Brisbane. The protests arose after five men from Roma were charged with a variety of anti-homosexuality offences. At the time the maximum penalty for "sodomy" was seven years in jail. Opinion polls published by The Bulletin during that era suggested that while a majority of Queenslanders did not support equal rights for gay people, they thought that private homosexual conduct between consenting adults should be decriminalised. Before legalisation about 460 men were convicted under the laws, with police making arrests as late as 1989.

=== Legalisation of male same-sex activity ===
The Fitzgerald Inquiry was commissioned in the late 1980s in Bjelke-Peteresen's temporary absence, following allegations of corruption and misconduct in the Queensland Police. The inquiry subsequently investigated the entire system of government. One of its recommendations was that a newly established Criminal Justice Commission review the laws governing voluntary sexual behaviour, including homosexual activity.

This proposal was an issue in the 1989 state election. National Party leader Russell Cooper, whose party was heavily implicated in corruption by the Fitzgerald Inquiry, tried to galvanise socially conservative support using his party's opposition to the legalisation of homosexual conduct. During the election campaign he claimed that his party's corruption was a "secondary issue" to moral issues like abortion and homosexuality, adding that the then-Opposition Labor's policy of decriminalisation would send a "flood of gays crossing the border from the Southern states". As a result, Cooper was lampooned in Labor advertisements as a wild-eyed reactionary, a clone of Bjelke-Petersen and/or a puppet of National Party president Sir Robert Sparkes. Cooper's party lost the election to Labor.

Following its victory, the new Government of Wayne Goss undertook the proposed review into the legality of homosexuality. That review recommended that homosexual offences be removed from the state's Criminal Code and that the age of consent for private consensual conduct be 16 years for both homosexual and heterosexual conduct.

Goss' government largely implemented the changes in the Criminal Code and Another Act Amendment Act 1990, which was passed by the parliament on 28 November 1990 and received royal assent on 7 December 1990. Decriminalisation was strongly opposed by the National Party at the time, but they ultimately failed to prevent it. Repeal of the anti-homosexuality offences took effect upon proclamation on 19 January 1991.

=== Age of consent equalisation ===
The initial decriminalisation of homosexuality in Queensland in 1991 failed to implement an equal age of consent, despite it being a majority recommendation of the 1990 Parliamentary Criminal Justice Committee review of homosexuality. Queensland's age of consent remained at 16 for oral and vaginal sex. By comparison, the age of consent for anal sex was set at 18, with section 208 of the Queensland Criminal Code imposing up to 14 years imprisonment for "sodomy" that involved a person under that age, whether male or female. When the government of Wayne Goss decriminalised male homosexual activity in Queensland, it imposed a higher age of consent for anal intercourse as a "pragmatic political response" to the objections of religious lobby groups, who largely equated homosexuality with anal sex.

In 1996 the Borbidge National/Liberal government changed the terminology in section 208 from "anal intercourse" to "sodomy" and doubled the applicable penalties. In October 2008 Labor's Attorney-General Kerry Shine raised the penalty for attempting under-18 sodomy to be the same as for committing the act.

By 2016, Queensland was the last state or territory in Australia without an equal age of consent for all sexual activity. Successive state governments had ignored repeated calls for reform since the 1990s.

Reform gained traction in August 2015, when the Palaszczuk government announced that it would consider a proposal to equalise age of consent laws relating to sexual intercourse. On 16 June 2016, the Minister for Health and Ambulance Services, Cameron Dick, introduced to the parliament the Health and Other Legislation Amendment Bill 2016. Among other things, the legislation amended the state Criminal Code to standardise the age of consent for all forms of sexual intercourse to 16 years and replaced "anachronistic, value-laden" and stigmatising references to "sodomy" with the neutral term "anal intercourse". The bill was reviewed by the Legal Affairs and Community Safety Committee, which tabled its report to parliament on 1 September 2016. The committee recommend the bill be passed in full by the parliament, finding that the existing law was "particularly discriminatory to same-sex attracted young men and could inhibit their ability to receive advice on sexual health", and that it denied "peer acceptance and community support" to gay and bisexual youth. The bill passed the parliament on 15 September 2016 and went into effect following royal assent on 23 September 2016. Labor Party politicians voted unanimously along with independent politicians to pass the changes, together with 28 Opposition LNP members. The remaining members of the LNP abstained, while the two Katter's Australian Party politicians were the only votes against the legislation.

=== Historical conviction expungement and apology ===
In 2012 the Australian Senate passed a motion recommending that all states and territories "enact legislation that expressly purges convictions imposed on people prior to the decriminalisation of homosexual conduct". Since that time, most Australian jurisdictions introduced expungement schemes to have such convictions removed from a person's record. When asked in 2014 whether Queensland would follow suit, then-Attorney General Jarrod Bleijie initially stated there were "no plans" to do so, before subsequently confirming that he would have an "open mind" to reviewing the law following discussions with the state's LGBTI Legal Service.

No action was taken until the election of the Palaszczuk Labor government, which announced in January 2016 that it had referred to the Queensland Law Reform Commission (QLRC) the issue of expunging historical consensual homosexual sex crimes. The commission reported back to the government on 31 August 2016 with a series of recommendations. On 29 November 2016 the Attorney General tabled the report to Parliament and released draft legislation aimed at allowing men convicted or charged with historical homosexual convictions and "certain historical public morality offences" to apply to have their convictions struck from the public record.

The resulting Criminal Law (Historical Homosexual Convictions Expungement) Bill 2017 was introduced to the Queensland Parliament on 11 May 2017. The law allows a person convicted of, or charged with, an eligible offence to apply to the Director-General of the Department of Justice and Attorney-General for the conviction or charge to be purged. In order to be eligible for expungement, the individual must have been charged with an offence involving participants aged at least 18 years. Given the age of consent was lowered from 18 to 16 in 2016, this means that individuals charged with an offence when they were 16 or 17 between 1991 and 2016 are ineligible to apply for expungement. In a departure from the QLRC's recommendations, the legislation also allows those charged with "public morality offences" to apply for those to also be expunged.

The introduction of the expungement scheme proposal was accompanied by an official apology from Queensland Premier Annastacia Palaszczuk on behalf of the Queensland Parliament to people charged under historical anti-homosexuality laws. The apology motion passed without objection, though LNP Opposition Leader Tim Nicholls did not speak to the motion. The bill was referred to the Legal Affairs and Community Safety Committee, which tabled its report to parliament on 14 July 2017. The committee recommended that the bill be passed, though LNP members objected to the inclusion of "public morality" offences in the legislation. The bill passed the Parliament on 10 October 2017. Amendments moved by the Attorney-General allowing offences in certain circumstances to be expunged if they occurred in a public place were passed. The bill received royal assent on 23 October 2017. The Act and related regulation went into effect from 30 June 2018.

== Recognition of same-sex relationships ==
Cohabiting same-sex couples have been recognised as "de facto" partners under Queensland law since 2002 and under Commonwealth law since 2008. Civil partnerships were first introduced by the Labor Party under Anna Bligh in 2012, to allow couples to register their relationship with the option of an official ceremony. They were temporarily downgraded to "registered partnerships" under the short-lived government of Campbell Newman and his Liberal National Party, before being reinstated by the returned Labor administration of Annastacia Palaszczuk in 2016.

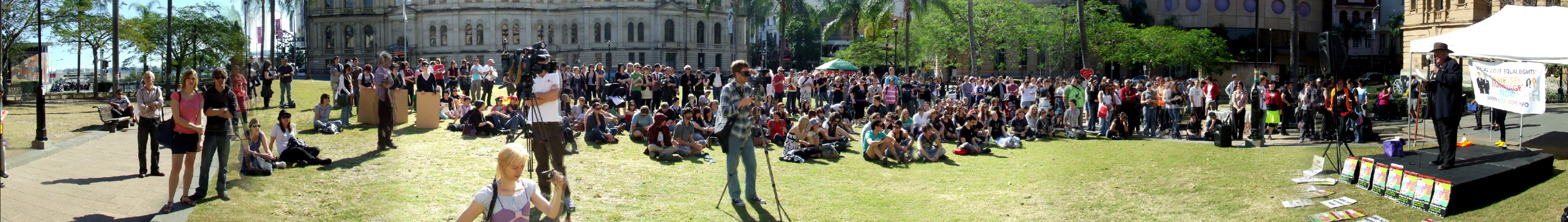
Panorama of a 2009 rally in favour of same-sex marriage in Queens Gardens, Brisbane

=== Same-sex marriage ===
Same-sex marriage became legal in Queensland, and in the rest of Australia, in December 2017, after the Federal Parliament passed a law legalising same-sex marriage. The first same-sex couple to marry in the state were Craig Burns and Luke Sullivan just after midnight on 9 January 2018.

Since 1 September 2021 Queensland has formally included the "X" non-binary option for marriage certificates, forms and documents - alongside male and female.

=== De facto recognition ===
The Queensland Government first offered limited recognition to same-sex couples in 1999, focussing on three areas of law – property division, domestic violence protection orders and employment leave. December 2002 saw more comprehensive reform with the passage of the Discrimination Law Amendment Act 2002. This led to the recognition of same-sex couples in 45 pieces of state legislation and amended the definition of "de facto partner" in the Acts Interpretation Act 1954 to include same-sex couples. A number of factors should be considered in determining whether a couple is living together on a "genuine domestic basis" and therefore de facto partnerrs, including the nature and extent of their common residence, the length of the relationship, financial and property arrangements, whether the relationship was sexual, the degree of mutual commitment to a shared life and public aspects of the relationship, among other considerations. This reflects the factors considered both at federal level and in other states and territories.

Since the 2002 amendments, same-sex partners are now recognised in over 60 pieces of state legislation, including superannuation entitlements, workers compensation, the distribution of property in the event of a separation and state-based parental, family, bereavement and carer's leave provisions, among others.

The Equal Opportunity in Public Employment Act 1992 and the Public Service Act 2008 promotes equality of employment in the public sector. Furthermore, if a gay or lesbian couple came to Queensland from another state where they were recognised as a couple, Queensland will do the same.

A series of amendments to Commonwealth legislation in 2008 provided complete recognition of same-sex couples at the federal level. This led to a contradiction with Queensland laws, particularly where children were involved. For example, federal law could require the non-biological parent to pay child maintenance even though Queensland law may not have recognised that person as a parent. Without legal guardianship, health services may not have accepted the other parent authorising procedures for the child. If the biological parent died, his or her partner would not have been considered the next of kin. These issues were remedied when Queensland allowed same-sex adoption legislation in 2016.

=== Civil partnerships ===
Queensland first allowed civil partnerships with the option of an official ceremony, commonly known as civil unions, for both same-sex and opposite-sex couples from February 2012 under the Bligh Labor government. Subsequent changes by the Newman LNP Government watered down civil partnerships, replacing them with "registered relationships" and eliminating official ceremonies from June 2012 onwards. In December 2015, the Palaszczuk Labor government restored civil partnerships and official ceremonies. The historical developments are detailed below.

==== Bligh Government ====
In June 2008, Queensland Attorney-General Kerry Shine announced that the Queensland Government would begin considering a relationships registry for same-sex couples in the second half of 2008. A Galaxy poll conducted in December 2008 showed 60 percent of people in Queensland supported civil unions with 54 percent supporting gay marriage.

However, no progress was made on the issue until late 2011. On 21 October 2011, Deputy Premier Andrew Fraser announced that he would introduce a private member's bill to legalise civil partnerships, which would allow same-sex relationships to be officially registered in Queensland and would allow the option of an official ceremony. Similarly to the existing recognition of same-sex couples as de facto partners, civil partnerships would provide most of the rights of marriage, excluding adoption rights. Fraser was criticised by the then-Opposition LNP, who claimed his bill was a "political stunt" designed to win Greens preferences in his electorate of Mt Cootha.

The Civil Partnerships Bill 2011 was introduced into Parliament on 25 October 2011 and passed its first reading on a 46–30 vote. On 30 November 2011, it passed its second and third reading on a 47–40 vote. Members of the then-governing Labor Party were granted a conscience vote. Most voted in favour, except for Michael Choi, Geoff Wilson, Margaret Keech and Jo-Ann Miller. LNP members were denied a conscience vote and voted as a bloc against it. They were joined in opposition by most of the cross-bench, except for Peter Wellington. The legislation passed and became law after receiving royal assent on 6 December 2011. The law commenced operation on 23 February 2012, allowing the first civil unions to be celebrated in March following a 10-day waiting period. The legislation aligned Queensland with Tasmania, Victoria, the ACT and NSW, which had already implemented similar laws.

Details of 2011 Legislative Assembly vote to introduce civil partnerships

Civil Partnerships Bill 2011 – Third Reading
Party	Votes for	Votes against
Labor (50)	46: Julie Attwood; Anna Bligh (Premier); Desley Boyle; Peta-Kaye Croft; Vicky Darling; Cameron Dick; Di Farmer; Simon Finn; Andrew Fraser; Grace Grace (teller); Stirling Hinchliffe; Paul Hoolihan; Jan Jarratt; Mandy Johnstone; Kate Jones; Betty Kiernan; Steven Kilburn; Peter Lawlor; Paul Lucas; Carolyn Male (teller); Evan Moorhead; Tim Mulherin; Lindy Nelson-Carr; Rachel Nolan; Jason O'Brien; Mary-Anne O'Neill; Annastacia Palaszczuk; Curtis Pitt; Phil Reeves; Neil Roberts; Stephen Robertson; Mark Ryan; Robert Schwarten; Desley Scott; Kerry Shine; Christine Smith; Judy Spence; Barbara Stone; Karen Struthers; Carryn Sullivan; Lillian van Litsenburg; Craig Wallace; Murray Watt; Dean Wells; Wayne Wendt; Steve Wettenhall	4: Michael Choi; Margaret Keech; Jo-Ann Miller; Geoff Wilson
Liberal National (31)	–	31: Ros Bates; Jarrod Bleijie; Michael Crandon; Andrew Cripps; Tracy Davis; Jack Dempsey; Steve Dickson; Alex Douglas; Peter Dowling; Glen Elmes; Scott Emerson; Bruce Flegg; David Gibson; Howard Hobbs; Ray Hopper; Mike Horan; Vaughan Johnson; John-Paul Langbroek; Mark McArdle; Ted Malone; Rosemary Menkens; Tim Nicholls; Andrew Powell; Ian Rickuss (teller); Mark Robinson; Jeff Seeney; Fiona Simpson; Ted Sorensen (teller); Lawrence Springborg; Ray Stevens; Jann Stuckey
Katter's Australian (2)	–	2: Shane Knuth; Aidan McLindon
Independent (4)	1: Peter Wellington	3: Liz Cunningham; Chris Foley; Dorothy Pratt
Total	47	40

==== Newman Government ====
The 2012 state election was held soon after civil partnerships became available, with differing policy approaches offered by parties. The Labor Party and Queensland Greens supported retaining them without changes. Katter's Australian Party proposed a full repeal of the civil partnership law, and were criticised for a homophobic advertisement attacking Campbell Newman for his personal support for same-sex marriage.

Before the LNP took office, party leader Campbell Newman stated that repealing the laws after couples had already entered into civil partnerships would create an "unacceptable and intolerable situation", and so promised to do nothing. He later stated that the party would repeal the law.

On 12 June 2012, Premier Newman and Attorney-General Jarrod Bleijie announced that the legislation would be amended to remove aspects that "mimicked marriage", such as the option of an official ceremony, to avoid offending conservative religious groups.

On 22 June 2012 the Civil Partnerships and Other Legislation Amendment Bill 2012 was passed by a 69–8 vote, amending the Civil Partnerships Act with effect from 27 June 2012. All LNP members voted as a bloc to amend the law. They were opposed by the six present ALP members and independent Peter Wellington. Liz Cunningham also voted against the bill as she wanted a full repeal of the law, while the two Katter's Australian Party members, who also wanted full repeal, abstained.

Apart from renaming the legislation to the Relationships Act 2011, other changes included: changing the terminology to "registered relationships"; amending the termination process, so that instead of seeking a court order from the District Court, an application would be lodged with the Registrar of Births, Deaths and Marriages, thereby reducing the similarities with obtaining a divorce; and repealing the option of state-sanctioned ceremonies.

Details of 2012 Legislative Assembly vote to replace civil partnerships with registered relationships

Civil Partnerships and Other Legislation Amendment Bill 2012 – Third Reading
Party	Votes for	Votes against
Liberal National (69)	69: Verity Barton; Stephen Bennett; Ian Berry; Jarrod Bleijie; Mark Boothman; Robert Cavallucci; Sean Choat; Jason Costigan; Sam Cox; Michael Crandon; Andrew Cripps; David Crisafulli; Steve Davies; Chris Davis; Jack Dempsey; Steve Dickson; Aaron Dillaway; Alex Douglas; Peter Dowling; Scott Driscoll; Glen Elmes; Scott Emerson; Bruce Flegg; Lisa France; Deb Frecklington; David Gibson; John Grant; Darren Grimwade; Reg Gulley; Michael Hart; John Hathaway; Seath Holswich; Vaughan Johnson; Carl Judge; Ian Kaye; David Kempton; Gavin King; Jon Krause; John-Paul Langbroek; Mike Latter; Anne Maddern; Ted Malone; Tim Mander; Rosemary Menkens (teller); Kerry Millard; Steve Minnikin; Rob Molhoek; Campbell Newman (Premier); Tim Nicholls; Freya Ostapovitch; Andrew Powell; Michael Pucci; Saxon Rice; Ian Rickuss; Trevor Ruthenberg; Jeff Seeney; Anthony Shorten; Dale Shuttleworth; Tarnya Smith (teller); Ted Sorensen; Lawrence Springborg; Ray Stevens; Mark Stewart; Jann Stuckey; Neil Symes; Michael Trout; Ian Walker; Trevor Watts; Jason Woodforth	–
Labor (6)	–	6: Bill Byrne; Jo-Ann Miller; Tim Mulherin; Annastacia Palaszczuk; Desley Scott; Jackie Trad
Katter's Australian (2) (Note: Although the Katter Party MPs voted against the third reading, they abstained from the second reading)	–	2: Rob Katter; Shane Knuth
Independent (2)	–	2: Liz Cunningham; Peter Wellington
Total	69	10

==== Palaszczuk Government ====
Following the Queensland election in January 2015, the Labor Party returned to power, defeating the Liberal National Party and forming minority government. In May 2015, the Labor government announced its intention to reinstate civil partnerships and state-sanctioned official ceremonies.

In September 2015, the government introduced the Relationships (Civil Partnerships) and Other Acts Amendment Bill 2015 to the parliament. Under the legislation, any couple has the option of participating in an official ceremony prior to having their relationships registered. The bill also amends other terminologies used throughout the existing Act including replacing references to 'registered relationship' with 'civil partnership.' The bill received the support of two of the four crossbenchers in the parliament. On 17 September 2015, the bill was referred to the Legal Affairs and Community Safety Committee, who reported back to parliament on 17 November 2015. On 23 November 2015, the LNP opposition announced it would have a free vote on the legislation.

On 3 December 2015, the bill passed the parliament by a margin of 64 votes to 22. On 17 December 2015 the legislation was granted royal assent by the Governor, becoming the Relationships (Civil Partnerships) and Other Acts Amendment Act 2015. The Act came into effect following a number of administrative procedures, with civil partnerships resuming in the state on 2 April 2016.

Details of 2015 Legislative Assembly vote to restore civil partnerships

Relationships (Civil Partnerships) and Other Acts Amendment Bill 2015 – Third Reading
Party	Votes for	Votes against
Labor (43)	43: Mark Bailey; Nikki Boyd; Don Brown; Glenn Butcher; Bill Byrne; Craig Crawford; Yvette D'Ath; Mick de Brenni (teller); Cameron Dick; Leanne Donaldson; Leeanne Enoch; Di Farmer; Shannon Fentiman; Mark Furner; Julieanne Gilbert; Grace Grace; Aaron Harper; Stirling Hinchliffe; Jennifer Howard; Kate Jones; Joe Kelly; Shane King; Brittany Lauga; Leanne Linard; Anthony Lynham; Jim Madden; Steven Miles; Jo-Ann Miller; Coralee O'Rourke; Annastacia Palaszczuk (Premier); Jim Pearce; Joan Pease; Duncan Pegg; Curtis Pitt; Linus Power (teller); Rob Pyne; Peter Russo; Mark Ryan; Bruce Saunders; Scott Stewart; Jackie Trad; Chris Whiting; Rick Williams	–
Liberal National (40)	20: Verity Barton; Jarrod Bleijie; Mark Boothman; Sid Cramp; Michael Crandon; Tracy Davis; Glen Elmes; Scott Emerson; Deb Frecklington; Michael Hart; John-Paul Langbroek; Dale Last; Mark McArdle; Matt McEachan; Steve Minnikin; Rob Molhoek; Tim Nicholls; Ray Stevens; Jann Stuckey; Ian Walker	20: Ros Bates; Stephen Bennett; Jason Costigan; Andrew Cripps; Steve Dickson (teller); Jon Krause; Ann Leahy; Tim Mander; John McVeigh; Lachlan Millar; Tony Perrett; Andrew Powell; Ian Rickuss (teller); Mark Robinson; Christian Rowan; Fiona Simpson; Tarnya Smith; Lawrence Springborg; Trevor Watts; Pat Weir
Katter's Australian (2)	–	2: Rob Katter; Shane Knuth
Independent (1)	1: Billy Gordon	–
Total	64	22

=== Recognition of interstate and overseas unions ===
Queensland automatically recognises the civil union or relationship registration schemes of New South Wales, Victoria, Tasmania, South Australia and the Australian Capital Territory and they are taken to be a civil partnership for the purposes of Queensland law. From 22 September 2017, a range of overseas same-sex marriages or civil unions gained recognition as civil partnerships, having previously been recognised only as de facto relationships under state law. Since the commencement of the federal Marriage Amendment (Definition and Religious Freedoms) Act 2017 on 9 December 2017, overseas same-sex marriages have been automatically recognised as marriages under Australian law.

== Adoption and parenting rights ==
=== Adoption and foster parenting ===
Single LGBTI people and same-sex couples in Queensland are eligible to adopt children since 11 November 2016. Queensland was the third-last jurisdiction to allow same-sex adoption in 2016. Since April 2018, all Australian jurisdictions legally allow same-sex couples to adopt children.

==== Historical position ====
Before 2016, same-sex couples in Queensland had limited recognition under Queensland parenting law. They were unable to legally adopt a child, but were allowed to act as foster parents.

The issue of same-sex adoption first gained prominence in 2007, when the Human Rights and Equal Opportunity Commission (HREOC) issued a report entitled National Inquiry into Discrimination against People in Same-Sex Relationships which recommended amending or creating laws recognising the relationship between a child and both same-sex parents. In particular, "'Stepparent adoption' laws should more readily consider adoption by a lesbian co-mother or gay co-father." This will require amendments to remove the prohibition on same-sex stepparent adoption in all state and territory laws other than in WA, the ACT and Tasmania." The final report of the Same-Sex: Same Entitlements Inquiry was tabled in Parliament on 21 June 2007.

The state's adoption rules were revised in August 2009 with the Adoption Act 2009 which only allowed opposite-sex couples who were married or in a de facto relationship for two years to adopt. The Act required that applicants for both adoption and stepparent adoption be married or de facto and "the person's spouse is not the same gender as the person" making the application. Although discriminatory, the adoption legislation excluded operation of the Anti-Discrimination Act. A key reform enabled foster parents to more easily adopt their foster children, although same-sex foster parents were excluded. Independent (previously One Nation) MP Dorothy Pratt said, "I must say I was very pleased there was no allowance in this bill for homosexual couples to adopt a child." Queensland Premier Anna Bligh's approach was described as "confusing" by the Queensland Council for Civil Liberties after she stated that "everyone – regardless of their sexual status or their gender – should be afforded the privileges of parenthood" in the context of surrogacy, but failed to apply this logic to adoption laws. Campbell Newman's LNP Government did not consider the issue of same-sex adoption before losing power in 2015.

==== 2016 Palaszczuk Government reforms ====
Following the return of the Labor Party to power in 2015, Communities Minister Shannon Fentiman suggested that the exclusion of same-sex couples from Queensland's adoption laws was out of step with contemporary standards and most other Australian states and territories. She announced the government was seeking public submissions about the laws as part of a five-year review of the legislation. A review of the state's Adoption Act was held, with submissions closing on 11 March 2016. On 6 August 2016, the government announced it would table a bill in the parliament later in the month to remove the ban on same-sex adoption, as well as legislate to allow single people and couples undergoing fertility treatment to adopt. The bill would also allow more information to be given to adoptees, make it easier for step-parents to adopt, and remove the offence and penalty for breaches of "no contact" provisions for adoptions before 1991. To these effects, the Adoption and Other Legislation Amendment Bill 2016 was introduced into the parliament on 14 September 2016 by the Minister for Communities, Shannon Fentiman. The legislation was immediately referred to the Health, Communities, Disability Services and Domestic and Family Violence Prevention Committee, which reported back to parliament on 26 October 2016. The committee was unable to come to a recommendation, with government MP's supportive of the proposed amendments and non-government MP's unsupportive of the amendments. The committee therefore summarised the varying stakeholder views and included an overview of the government's Department of Communities, Child Safety and Disability Services response to said views, noting that the department was largely in favour of the provisions in the bill allowing same-sex couples, single people and couples undergoing fertility treatment to adopt.

The bill returned to the parliament and was debated in the Assembly on 2 November. Parliament divided on six clauses in the bill (all of which expanded the adoption eligibility criteria to allow same-sex couples and single persons to adopt), with 43 votes in favour and 43 opposed. All members of the Labor government voted in favour of the bill and all members of the Liberal National opposition voted against. Independent MP's Rob Pyne and Billy Gordon joined Labor in supporting the bill whilst the two Katter's Australian Party MP's voted against the bill. The Speaker (Independent MP Peter Wellington) cast the decisive vote in favour of the bill, ensuring it passed the parliament. The legislation went into effect upon receiving royal assent on 11 November 2016, becoming the Adoption and Other Legislation Amendment Act 2016.

Details of 2016 Legislative Assembly vote to allow same-sex adoption

Adoption and Other Legislation Amendment Bill 2016 – Second and Third Readings
Party	Votes for	Votes against	Absent
Labor (42)	41: Nikki Boyd; Don Brown; Glenn Butcher; Bill Byrne; Craig Crawford; Yvette D'Ath; Mick de Brenni; Cameron Dick; Leanne Donaldson; Leeanne Enoch; Di Farmer; Shannon Fentiman; Mark Furner; Julieanne Gilbert; Grace Grace; Aaron Harper; Stirling Hinchliffe; Jennifer Howard; Kate Jones; Joe Kelly; Shane King; Brittany Lauga; Leanne Linard; Anthony Lynham; Jim Madden; Steven Miles; Jo-Ann Miller; Coralee O'Rourke; Annastacia Palaszczuk (Premier); Jim Pearce; Joan Pease; Duncan Pegg; Curtis Pitt; Linus Power; Peter Russo; Mark Ryan; Bruce Saunders; Scott Stewart; Jackie Trad; Chris Whiting; Rick Williams	–	1: Mark Bailey
Liberal National (42)	–	41: Verity Barton; Ros Bates; Stephen Bennett; Jarrod Bleijie; Mark Boothman; Jason Costigan; Sid Cramp; Michael Crandon; Andrew Cripps; Tracy Davis; Steve Dickson; Glen Elmes; Scott Emerson; Deb Frecklington; Michael Hart; David Janetzki; Jon Krause; John-Paul Langbroek; Dale Last; Ann Leahy; Tim Mander; Matt McEachan; Lachlan Millar; Steve Minnikin; Rob Molhoek; Tim Nicholls; Tony Perrett; Andrew Powell; Ian Rickuss; Mark Robinson; Christian Rowan; Jeff Seeney; Fiona Simpson; Tarnya Smith; Ted Sorensen; Lawrence Springborg; Ray Stevens; Jann Stuckey; Ian Walker; Trevor Watts; Pat Weir	1: Mark McArdle
Independent (3)	3: Billy Gordon; Rob Pyne; Peter Wellington (Speaker)	–	–
Katter's Australian (2)	–	2: Rob Katter; Shane Knuth	–
Total	44 (Note: The Speaker does not normally vote but with the vote tied 43-all, cast the deciding vote in favour of allowing same-sex adoption)	43	2

=== Assisted reproductive technology ===
Socially-infertile women (lesbians) are permitted access to assisted reproductive treatment (ART) such as in vitro fertilisation (IVF) treatment in Queensland. Section 21 of the Status of Children Act 1978 provides that where a de facto or married woman, or a woman in a same-sex relationship, gives birth as a result of using artificial insemination without the consent of her partner, the donor of the semen used has no rights or liabilities in relation to the child born as a result of that procedure. This exclusion of liabilities and rights also applies to a man donating semen to a single woman. The Act also allows the female de facto partner of the birth mother to be recognised as the legal co-parent in all circumstances, provided the child has been born through the use of a fertilisation procedure with the consent of the birth mother's female de facto partner.

Queensland law (from 2002 until September 2024) previously allowed fertility clinics to refuse to provide assisted reproductive technology services “based on the relationship status or sexuality” of those seeking such services. On 10 September 2024, legislation was passed to repeal section 45A of the Anti-Discrimination Act 1991 that allowed assisted reproductive technology service providers to discriminate on these grounds. On 19 September 2024, the bill became an official Act by royal assent by the Governor of Queensland, and section 45A was officially repealed effective immediately.

=== Surrogacy ===
The Surrogate Parenthood Act 1988, which commenced on 6 October 1988, prohibited all forms of surrogacy, formal and informal, paid and altruistic. All surrogacy contracts were deemed void and entering into an agreement (or offering to do so), as well as giving or receiving payment were prohibited. Any advertising in relation to surrogacy was also prohibited. It became a criminal offence for a person ordinarily resident in Queensland to enter into a commercial surrogacy arrangement anywhere in the world.

In May 2008, a parliamentary committee was formed to examine whether to decriminalise altruistic surrogacy in Queensland. Commercial surrogacy was immediately ruled out. A parliamentary report recommended legalising surrogacy only as a last resort, and that people must meet several criteria, including being medically infertile or unable to carry a child.

In October 2009, Attorney-General Cameron Dick released for consultation draft laws to decriminalise altruistic surrogacy and put into place certain strict requirements, including satisfying the court they have undergone counselling, received independent legal advice and have established a medical or social need for the surrogacy. The draft Bill did not restrict who can enter into a surrogacy arrangement, meaning that a couple, either married or de facto (same-sex or heterosexual) or a single person (male or female) could be the intended parent or intended parents in a surrogacy arrangement and then subsequently apply for a parentage order. The government's draft Bill also amended the law to recognise two mothers as parents. The opposition Liberal National Party countered the Labor government's moves by proposing a law specifically excluding single parents and same-sex couples from any new surrogacy laws. Queensland's Attorney General called the opposition's response "offensive".

The Labor government's bill, which did not restrict who can enter into a surrogacy arrangement, was tabled in November and passed 45 to 36 on 11 February 2010 with seven not voting. The opposition's surrogacy bill was dismissed, and their amendments did not pass. The decriminalisation of altruistic surrogacy allows singles and couples to enter into surrogacy arrangements and to become the parent of a child. It remains illegal for Queensland residents to enter into commercial surrogacy arrangements anywhere in the world. The law took effect on 1 June 2010.

During the 2012 election campaign, LNP leader Campbell Newman stated that the party would not change the new surrogacy laws if it won government. However, after the party attained government in 2012, Attorney-General Jarrod Bleijie announced in Parliament that the LNP would amend Queensland's surrogacy legislation to exclude same-sex couples, singles and heterosexual de facto couples of less than two years' standing. Bleijie claimed that Newman had not been "fully briefed" on the LNP's policy platform. Newman later stated that his pre-election promise was a "mistake" given earlier misgivings expressed by LNP members, and that he was listening to the majority of members in his party. Subsequently, moderates within the LNP had expressed concern about the proposal to remove surrogacy rights and it was quietly shelved, with Bleijie's announcement described by one colleague as a "brain snap".

== Transgender rights ==
Birth certificates and driver licences are within the jurisdiction of the states, whereas marriage and passports are matters for the Commonwealth. Queensland does legally recognise a person's change of sex. Transgender and intersex activists have campaigned to have the archaic sexual reassignment surgery requirement abolished for years.

=== Gender-affirming care ===
In January 2025, shortly after assuming office, Queensland Health Minister Tim Nicholls under the right-wing Queensland Liberal Party announced an immediate pause on the prescription of puberty blockers (Stage 1 treatment) and cross-sex hormones (Stage 2 treatment) for new patients under 18 with gender dysphoria in Queensland's public health services, pending an independent review of evidence and best practices. The directive, issued by Queensland Health Director-General David Rosengren, exempted existing patients and allowed non-pharmacological support such as counselling, citing "contested evidence" on benefits and risks, including reports of treatments provided to children as young as 12 without adequate oversight. In November 2025, the opposition left-wing Queensland Labor Party passed a motion opposing the ban.

The policy, the first such ban in an Australian state, faced legal challenge from a parent of a transgender teenager, who argued it was procedurally flawed and politically motivated. On 27 October 2025, the Queensland Supreme Court ruled the directive unlawful, finding Rosengren had failed to conduct required consultations with Hospital and Health Service executives (limited to a 22-minute Microsoft Teams meeting concurrent with Nicholls's media announcement) under the Hospital and Health Boards Act 2011. Justice Peter Callaghan set aside the order, describing it as an improper exercise of power, though he did not rule on its substantive merits.

Hours later, on 28 October 2025, Nicholls exercised his ministerial discretion under section 44 of the Act to issue a new directive reinstating the restrictions in substantially the same terms, applying immediately to all public Hospital and Health Services. It mandates multidisciplinary panel approval for any exceptions and prioritises psychological interventions, pending the review's completion (expected November 2025) and a further evidence assessment by January 2026. Nicholls justified the action as necessary "in the public interest" to protect children amid ongoing debates over treatment efficacy. A legal challenge against the new directive was filed in December 2025.

The move has drawn criticism from medical bodies like the Australian Medical Association, left-wing political parties and LGBTQ+ advocates, who contend it undermines clinical autonomy, evidence-based care, and access for vulnerable youth, potentially exacerbating inequities by pushing families toward private services.

=== Birth certificates ===
Since 24 June 2024, Queensland implemented new updated legislation and regulation that went into legal effect - allowing individuals to fully legally recognize a change of sex on a birth certificate without any sexual reassignment surgery, divorce and sterilization whatsoever and to also legally allow a third choice sex marker that consists of namely male, female or non-binary. A non-refundable fee and cost of $130.40 must be payable upfront with the application form to change sex on an individual birth certificate within Queensland.

=== Drivers licences ===
Since October 2016, Queensland no longer by regulation records both height or gender on an individual's drivers licence. Australian Transgender Support Association Queensland president Gina Mather responded that her organisation had not been consulted and she believed that most trans* Queenslanders would in fact prefer to keep the sex identifier on their licences, since it was an easy way for them to prove their identity.

Before the change, Queensland had been the only state to issue driver licences that contained a person's sex. Changing it required, in addition to completing a form and evidence of identity and/or name change, an official letter from a registered medical practitioner, psychiatrist or psychologist confirming that the person was "undergoing treatment on a gender re-assignment program" and should be considered the corresponding sex.

=== Change of name ===
If a transgender person wishes to change their name as part of their gender transition, they are required to do so before seeking to update their birth certificate. Queensland only allows people to change their name if they were either born/adopted in Queensland or born overseas but have lived in Queensland for at least twelve months. A name change is allowed every twelve months and cannot be made for criminal purposes, such as fraud.

=== Queensland Police Service documents ===
Since July 2020, Queensland Police Service forms allow a change of sex and/or name on documents online immediately.

=== Queensland Supreme Court ===
In January 2021, the Queensland Supreme Court allowed a transgender teenager to get approval for medical treatment with puberty blockers, provided that consent is given by at least one parent.

In October 2025, the Queensland Supreme Court Justice Peter Callaghan overturned the state's ban on puberty blockers for transgender minors after determining that the Queensland government did not adequately consult medical professionals before implementing the ban as required under state law. The ruling did not address the merits of the ban. Queensland Health Minister Tim Nicholls said he would explore ways to reinstate the ban following the ruling.

== Intersex rights ==
In March 2017, representatives of Androgen Insensitivity Syndrome Support Group Australia and Organisation Intersex International Australia participated in an Australian and Aotearoa/New Zealand consensus "Darlington Statement" by intersex community organizations and others. The statement calls for legal reform, including the criminalization of deferrable intersex medical interventions on children, an end to legal classification of sex, and improved access to peer support.

== Discrimination protections ==
=== State ===
In March 2025, it was announced that there would be delays and holdups to implement the 2024 Qld based anti discrimination comprehensive reforms - so that “businesses and individuals would be given more time to get ready”. Legislation passed in May 2025 to indefinitely delay the implementation of the long awaited reforms to the Queensland anti-discrimination laws. The reforms were due to go into effect 1 July 2025.

As of April 2024, the Queensland Anti Discrimination Act 1991 explicitly includes sexuality, gender identity and sex characteristics.

The Anti Discrimination Act 1991 initially protected gay men and lesbians from discrimination on the grounds of "lawful sexual activity". This approach had a number of deficiencies, such as reducing sexual orientation to sex acts and maintaining a "legislative silence" around LGBT people.

On 29 November 2002, Queensland Parliament passed the Discrimination Law Amendment Act 2002 which reformed a wide range of areas in the Queensland Anti-Discrimination Act 1991 such as couples (whether same sex or de facto), including transgender persons ("gender identity") and "sexuality" in protection under existing anti-discrimination and anti-vilification legislation. The areas covered are work and work related; education; goods and services; superannuation and insurance; disposal of land; accommodation; club membership; administration of state laws and programs; local government; existing partnership and in pre-partnership. The employment-related anti-discrimination provisions contain a "genuine occupational requirement" clause that allows religious organisations to make employment decisions which may discriminate against pregnant, openly gay, transgender or unmarried people, if such persons know their actions are "contrary to the employer's religious belief". The Queensland Human Rights Commission conducted a year-long review into the Act, presenting its findings to the Queensland Parliament in September 2022. The report recommends removing the clause and replacing it with a narrower one covering only teachers "involved in direct teaching of the religion".

In practice, those facing discrimination on the basis of gender identity have faced difficulties in pursuing anti-discrimination claims: in its 2013 annual report, the Anti-Discrimination Commission of Queensland noted that a single gender identity claim—0.2% of its work—had been upheld. Trans men and women potentially face years waiting for their claims to be resolved, with little support available for people outside south-east Queensland and Cairns.

=== Federal ===
Australian Commonwealth law does outlaw discrimination based on "marital or relationship status, sexual orientation, gender identity and/or intersex status" at the federal level in various areas that includes coverage of aged care, employment, health services, goods and services, and accommodation, since August 2013. Federal employment protection does include "sexual orientation" in the federal Fair Work Act 2009. However, in response to Australia's obligation to implement the principle of non-discrimination in employment and occupation pursuant to the International Labour Organisation Convention No.111 (ILO 111), the Human Rights and Equal Opportunity Commission (HREOC) Act established the HREOC in 1986, and empowers it to investigate complaints of discrimination in employment and occupation on various grounds, including sexual orientation, and to resolve such complaints by conciliation. If it cannot be conciliated, the Commission prepares a report to the federal Attorney-General who then tables the report in Parliament. Such discrimination is not rendered unlawful under the Act.

The Human Rights (Sexual Conduct) Act 1994 provided that sexual conduct involving only consenting adults (18 years or over) acting in private would not be subject to arbitrary interference by law enforcement. This applies to any law of the Commonwealth, State or Territory.

As of August 2013, the Australian federal Commonwealth Government under law does provide protections for "marital or relationship status, sexual orientation, gender identity and/or intersex status" at the federal level at various levels that cover aged care, employment, health services, goods and services, accommodation, etc. in the Human Rights Commission Act 1981 (Commonwealth legislation).

Federal law also protects LGBT and Intersex people in Queensland after additional protected attributes were added to the Sex Discrimination Act 1984 by the Sex Discrimination Amendment (Sexual Orientation, Gender Identity and Intersex Status) Act 2013, with effect from 1 August 2013.

=== Schools and LGBTI students ===
80% of 581 gay and lesbian students surveyed in Queensland in 2013 reported being bullied in a La Trobe University survey, the worst result in the country. In 2013 Queensland was the only state with no official policy in place to combat homophobic bullying.

In 2013 the Newman Government published a policy statement entitled "Supporting Same Sex Attracted, Intersex or Transgender Students at School", but it subsequently revoked the policy in favour of allowing principals to make decisions on a case-by-case basis. Education Minister John-Paul Langbroek noted there were "contentious views associated with gender diverse and same-sex attracted students", including opposition to recognising LGBT issues in schooling. The draft policy statement had encouraged state schools to have coeducational sporting teams, gender neutral uniforms and consider scheduling physical education classes to cut down on the number of clothes changes required. Instead, principals were to be provided with "supporting materials". The policy change was criticised by PFLAG national spokeswoman Shelley Argent while Australian Transgender Support Association Queensland president Gina Mathers supported the move to case-by-case decision-making, while expressing cynicism about its practical application.

Following the 2014 rollout of the Safe Schools anti-LGBTI bullying program across the country, controversy arose when social conservatives such as George Christensen and the Australian Christian Lobby opposed it for allegedly promoting age-inappropriate "radical sex education and gender theories" to children, with opposing petitions both for and against the program prepared for the Queensland Parliament. Education minister Kate Jones defended the program. It is voluntary for schools to participate in the Safe Schools program with the list of participating schools no longer publicly available since they began to receive harassment from members of the community. The Queensland Teachers Union opposed the Turnbull government's proposal that school principals needed approval from their Parents & Citizen's Association before they could participate in the program. Following the 2016 suicide of Tyrone Unsworth, a 13-year-old Aspley State High School student who faced incessant homophobic bullying, hundreds of people rallied in Brisbane for the compulsory introduction of Safe Schools across Queensland schools, which Education Minister Kate Jones stated would remain voluntary.

=== Abolition of gay panic defence ===
On 21 March 2017, the Queensland Parliament approved legislation clarifying that its Criminal Code did not allow unwanted sexual advances to be considered provocation, effectively abolishing the gay panic defence under Queensland law.

Historically, Australian courts interpreted the law of provocation to allow a man charged with the murder of another man to claim that he was provoked by a non-violent sexual advance from the deceased; this could act as a partial defence to murder, reducing the crime to manslaughter and resulting in a lower penalty. Known as the "gay panic defence" or "homosexual advance defence", it was used in a number of Australian murder trials where the victim was alleged to have made a homosexual advance towards his killer.

A 2008 report by the Queensland Law Reform Commission on the topic of provocation stated "it is difficult to imagine how a non-violent sexual advance to a man by a woman could be regarded as justification for killing the person making the advance... in principle, gender should make no difference to the law's conclusion". In 2008, two men attempted to use the gay panic defence after killing Wayne Ruks in the grounds of St Mary's Catholic Church in Maryborough, even though his mother clarified that Ruks was heterosexual and the video footage did not support the killers' claims. This case, followed by another attempt to use the defence in the nearby bashing death of hitchhiker Stephen Ward six months later, led local priest Father Paul Kelly to launch a Change.org petition to remove its application from Queensland law. The petition was supported by British comedian Stephen Fry and obtained 289,000 signatures by 2016.

Although the Bligh ALP Government flagged its intention to remove the defence, following the election of the Newman LNP government in 2012, new Attorney-General Jarrod Bleijie stated that no changes would be made. By 2016, all Australian states and territories apart from Queensland and South Australia had abolished the gay panic defence or the provocation doctrine altogether.

In May 2016, the Palaszczuk Government announced its intention to remove the homosexual advance defence by the end of the year. A number of celebrities subsequently voiced their support for the abolition of the homosexual advance defence by the year's end, including Tom Ballard, Benjamin Law, Josh Thomas, Rove McManus, Missy Higgins and Faustina Agolley.

On 30 November 2016, the Attorney-General introduced legislation to amend the provocation section of the Criminal Code so that an "unwanted sexual advance" could no longer reduce the criminal responsibility for a killing from murder to manslaughter. The defence of provocation would still be available in circumstances of an "exceptional character", which is undefined and would be assessed on a case-by-case basis by a judge, but may include a history of violence by the victim against their killer. Upon introducing the bill into the parliament, Attorney General Yvette D'Ath stated that, despite the "exceptional character" proviso, "an unwanted homosexual advance is not of itself to be considered an exceptional circumstance". The bill, the Criminal Law Amendment Bill 2016, was referred to the Legal Affairs and Community Safety Committee. A number of submissions were received in response to the proposal, including opposition from the Australian Christian Lobby who alleged that removing the "unwanted sexual advance" defence would discriminate against women who were groped. Representatives of the Queensland Law Society suggested including examples of "exceptional character" in the legislation to ensure the intention of the legislation was upheld, while the LGBTI Legal Service supported the proposal without any changes. The committee issued its report on 21 February 2017 and recommended that the bill be passed by the parliament in full. The concern regarding the lack of a definition as to what constitutes an "exceptional character" in a defence of provocation was discussed, with the committee recommending that the proposals in Clause 10 be reviewed in five years to establish whether they had operated as intended.

On 21 March 2017, the bill was read a second time and passed the parliament. Attorney-General Yvette D'Ath stated following the bill's passage that the reform would mean that "an unwanted sexual advance, even one that involves minor touching, cannot be enough, other than in circumstances in an exceptional character, to reduce criminal responsibility for killing a person with murderous intent." The LNP opposition moved amendments that would explain what constituted circumstances of 'exceptional character', though these were narrowly defeated. Ms D'Ath argued that it would be "impossible for the legislature to identify the infinite circumstances that may arise in a homicide case" and so left the term undefined, though insisted the parliament's clear intention was that it would not include "unwanted homosexual advances".

The bill received royal assent on 30 March 2017, becoming the Criminal Law Amendment Act 2017, and went into effect immediately.

=== Hate crime and vilification laws ===
In October 2023, a bill was passed and assented to implement "extensive, strong and broad based" hate crime and vilification legislation applying within Queensland - to explicitly include sexual orientation, gender identity and/or sex characteristics. The bill was supported unanimously within the Queensland Parliament. In December 2024, Queensland Police did a full scale raid on a Morningside house based on an electronic sign that displayed “words and messages of a racist, sexist, violent, inciting, anti-Semitic, anti-Muslim and also homophobic nature” - showing that the recent enacted Queensland legislation is in full force, working and being treated very seriously. Queensland has the “broadest and toughest” hate crime laws - including “comprehensive sweeping police powers” within Australia.

== Conversion therapy ban ==
Queensland effective since 20 August 2020, became the first jurisdiction within Australia to legally ban conversion therapy for sexual orientation or gender identity – with a maximum penalty of 18 months imprisonment and fines. The bill was passed in the parliament with a 47-41 vote, with the support of the Greens and Labor. The LNP, Katter's Australian Party and One Nation voted against the ban.

Health practitioners face fines and up to 18 months imprisonment for "conditioning techniques such as aversion therapy, psychoanalysis and hypnotherapy, clinical interventions, including counselling, or group activities that aim to change or suppress a person's sexual orientation or gender identity". The ban was criticised by the organisations SOGICE Survivors, Brave Network and PFLAG (parents and friends of lesbians and gays) for only focusing on healthcare professionals, when the practice often occurs in other settings – such as within religious organizations. The ban passed 47–41 with the ALP, an independent and Greens in favour of the bill – while the LNP, North Queensland First, Katter's Australia Party and One Nation opposed the bill.

Health Minister Steven Miles had announced the plan to ban gay conversion therapy practices in the state in November 2019. The proposal was supported by the Australian Psychological Society and the Queensland Human Rights Commission, while the Queensland Law Society expressed concern about unintended consequences of the drafted proposal and a number of religious schooling organisations indicated their opposition.

== Social conditions ==
=== Social attitudes to homosexuality ===
A 2005 paper by the Australia Institute, Mapping Homophobia in Australia, found that 38% of Queensland respondents considered homosexuality to be immoral, making it one of the most homophobic states in Australia, alongside Tasmania. Overall the most homophobic areas in the study were the Moreton area of country Queensland (excluding the Gold Coast and Sunshine Coast), Central/South-West Queensland and the Burnie/Western district of Tasmania, where 50 per cent considered homosexuality to be immoral.

A 2010 Roy Morgan poll confirmed Queensland as being the most anti-gay state in the nation, with one third of Queensland respondents considering homosexuality to be immoral. The state had the three federal electorates with the highest proportions of respondents considering homosexuality to be immoral – the Division of Capricornia (44.7%), the Division of Wright (44.1%) and the Division of Hinkler (42.8%). The state had nine of the twenty most homophobic federal electorates. While inner-city suburbs of Brisbane, the state's capital, were relatively tolerant, they still lagged the southern state capitals of Sydney and Melbourne.

In a 2016 study of support for the proposed legalisation of same-sex marriage in Australia, Queensland had five of the ten federal electorates most strongly opposed – with the only electorate recording over 50% opposition being the south-west Queensland-based division of Maranoa. At the other end of the spectrum, the division of Brisbane was the tenth-most supportive electorate in Australia.

=== Anti-LGBTI harassment ===
In 2010, Alan Berman and Shirleene Robinson released the findings of the largest survey ever undertaken into homophobic and transphobic abuse and reporting in Queensland. It found that overwhelming majorities of respondents had experienced some form of abuse. In relation to verbal abuse, the statistics were 76% of men, 69% of women, 92% of trans women and 55% of trans men. For physical assault without a weapon, the figures were 32%, 15%, 46% and 45% respectively. Where a weapon, knife, bottle or stone was involved, the statistics were 12%, 6%, 38% and 9% respectively, with 12% for "other".

The study found that 75% of LGBTI survey respondents did not report the abuse to police, with attackers usually being young men who did not know their victim.

=== Domestic violence ===
A person who is in a same sex, spousal or intimate personal relationship is protected by the Domestic and Family Violence Protection Act 1989. Couples in same-sex relationships who are victims of relationship violence may take out domestic violence orders against a violent partner, and other protective measures, including counselling services.

In 2014, Marcus Volke drew heavy media attention after murdering his transgender wife and committing suicide. The coverage of local newspaper the Courier Mail, which initially referred to her as a "she-male", mentioned her prostitution career and featured photos of her posing in a bikini, drew widespread condemnation for its transphobia, sensationalism and victim-blaming. The Courier Mail subsequently apologised for its coverage. In the aftermath of the case, criminologist specialising in domestic violence Sharon Hayes noted that transgender victims of domestic violence often "fell through the cracks", with a lack of support from women's refuges and other services.

Information about LGBT intimate partner violence is sparse, with studies conducted to date suggesting it is on par or higher than for the general population. In February 2018 the Queensland Government pledged $155,000 to train frontline domestic violence responders in handling LGBT domestic violence cases. LGBT domestic violence is under-reported due to fears of homophobia stemming from poor historical relations between Queensland Police and LGBT people. although this is being addressed through liaison officers and other outreach efforts.

=== LGBTI health ===
==== Queensland Council for LGBTI Health ====
The peak LGBTI health organisation is the Queensland Council for LGBTI Health (QC). Originally named the Queensland AIDS Council (QuAC), the organisation has also been known as the Queensland Association for Active Healthy Communities (QAHC) (Note: Before 2006, it was known as the "Queensland AIDS Committee". It was known between 2006 and 2013 as the "Queensland Association for Healthy Communities", reflecting a broader focus on general LGBTI welfare. The organisation changed their name back to the founded name of Queensland AIDS Council in 2013, followed by state-wide consultations with LGBTIQ+ sistergirl and brotherboy communities, and changed their name to Queensland Council for LGBTI Health, or 'QC' for short, in 2020 to better reflect communities, their identities, bodies, relationships and health. The group reverted to the "Queensland AIDS Council" moniker at its 2013 annual general meeting.) which was founded in 1984. The organisation has run various HIV/AIDS prevention programs since that time, including a controversial "Rip and Roll" safe sex billboard campaign showing two clothed men embracing while holding a condom packet. The ads were temporarily removed by billboard company Adshel after an Australian Christian Lobby-orchestrated complaint campaign before being reinstated following a public outcry. Before the 2012 election, when the LNP was opposing the ALP's civil partnerships legislation, QAHC (as it was then known) launched a "Speak out for equality" campaign in favour of the legislation. QC has grown their services to include wholistic health, social and emotional wellbeing, including physical health, mental health, sexual health, family practice services and health promotion initiatives across Queensland.

==== Newman Government policy ====
After the LNP won office in the 2012 election, it withdrew funding from QAHC, alleging that the organisation's advocacy had become inappropriately politicised and too far removed from its initial focus on preventing HIV/AIDS, alleging that its initiatives to reduce HIV infection were not working. This claim was contradicted by statistics demonstrating that in the 2010–2011 period before QHAC was defunded, new HIV infections had declined whereas they had risen in southern states.

The withdrawal of $2.5 million funding caused 26 of the organisation's 35 staff to lose their jobs. Health Minister Lawrence Springborg announced that he would set up an expert ministerial advisory committee on HIV/AIDS instead. The minister made the announcement through the media without contacting the organisation beforehand.

One of the members appointed to the nine person HIV/AIDS ministerial advisory committee, Dr Wendell Rosevear, subsequently resigned from the committee, likening the government to a "homophobic schoolyard bully". He cited the government's decision to defund QAHC and new rules forbidding non-profit organisations from agitating for state or federal law changes if their group receives half or more of its funding from Queensland Health and other state agencies as a "king hit" to the gay community.

Springborg announced his determination to eradicate HIV in Queensland, including through a cross-media "END HIV" campaign, free rapid HIV testing. The remaining members of the ministerial advisory committee led an "END HIV" campaign in a bid to reduce new HIV infection.

Springborg subsequently replaced the ministerial advisory committee with a new body, HIV Foundation Queensland, on World AIDS Day, 1 December 2013 to advise the state government on HIV/AIDS strategy and facilitate research. This development was welcomed by LGBTI health advocates.

==== Palaszczuk Government policy ====
With the election of the Palaszczuk Government in 2015, incoming health minister Cameron Dick announced that funding would be restored to the Queensland AIDS Council, with continued focus on preventative health, research and promotion. The government also justified equalising the age of consent for all forms of sexual activity at 16, to encourage younger Queenslanders to obtain health services without the fear of being criminalised.

== LGBTI community ==
=== Demographics ===
Accurate estimates of the LGBTI population are difficult owing to under-reporting, particularly among older same-sex couples. According to the first Australian Study of Health and Relationships, conducted in 2003, approximately 1.6% of Queensland male respondents identified as homosexual and 1.0% identified as bisexual. For women, the figures were 0.8% and 1.7% respectively. When it came to reported sexual attraction, 6.0% of Queensland men reported attraction to both sexes and 0.7% exclusively to the same sex. For women, the corresponding statistics were 11.7% and 0.2%. For sexual experiences, 5.5% of men and 7.7% of women reported having had sexual experiences with both sexes and 0.4% and 0.03% reported sexual experiences exclusively with their own sex. This has led to an estimate of there being between 72,000 and 370,000 LGBT people living in Queensland.

According to the 2011 Australian Census, the highest proportion of same-sex couples in Queensland live in inner-city Brisbane and on the Gold Coast. Queensland's top ten gay suburbs are New Farm, Fortitude Valley, Teneriffe, Nundah, Coorparoo, Surfers Paradise, Moorooka, West End, Southport and Clayfield.

The 2013 Queensland Gay Community Periodic Survey reported that between 2011 and 2013, there was a significant increase in the proportion of men who reported having met men through the mobile applications such as Grindr (26.2% to 38.5%). Mobile applications have become the most common way that men in Queensland meet male sex partners. Other common methods include meeting through the internet (37.7%), gay bars (28.1%), saunas (27.5%) and meeting men while visiting other Australian cities (21.1%).

=== Venues and events ===
There are a variety of community venues and events throughout Queensland for the LGBTI community.

Brisbane hosts several annual events: the Big Gay Day in March, the Brisbane Queer Film Festival at the New Farm Cinemas in April and the Brisbane Pride Festival in September, which originally began as a protest march in 1990. It also hosts Brisbane Leather Pride for the leather subculture in September and Northern Exposure for the bear subculture in October.

LGBTI venues in Brisbane include The beat Mega Club, Club 29, the Wickham Hotel and the Sportsman Hotel. Some venues offer regular LGBTI-focussed events, such as the weekly "Fluffy" parties at the One nightclub, the female-only "Scarlet" and the male-only "Grunt". The city also hosts several sex-on-premises venues: the gay saunas Wet Sauna and Bodyline and the cruising clubs Number 29 Cruise Club, The Den and Klub Kruise.

There are various LGBTI venues and events in regional Queensland. The Gold Coast hosts gay club Escape and the annual Gold Coast Gay Day in May. Cairns has a week-long Tropical Mardi Gras festival in October with gay-friendly nights at the Vibe bar while Townsville's gay venue is the Sovereign Hotel. Cairns is the second most popular Australian destination for LGBT tourists after Sydney, particularly as a destination immediately before and after the Sydney Gay and Lesbian Mardi Gras. There are a number of resorts catering specifically to LGBT tourists in the area, including the Turtle Cove Resort.

== Politics ==
Historically Queensland has had a comparatively conservative political culture, with right wing parties enjoying stronger levels of support compared to other Australian states. LGBTI support is strongest in south-east Queensland and particularly Brisbane, where it mirrors national trends, but it is weakest in the state's rural and regional areas to the north and west. Two factors have been suggested for the lower levels of support in those areas: a stronger religious culture and less ethnic and cultural diversity. One example is the Darling Downs, where anti-LGBT group the Australian Christian Lobby first arose. The regional hostility to LGBTI rights is reflected in controversial statements made by several regional Queensland politicians, such as George Christensen and Bob Katter. By contrast, Cairns conservative MP Warren Entsch has been a strong supporter of LGBTI rights for many years.

A powerful "religious right" lobby exists in the state's major conservative party, the Liberal National Party of Queensland (LNP). This lobby included, among others, the founding LNP organisation president Bruce McIver, a conservative Christian strongly opposed to gay equality; former Parliamentary Speaker Fiona Simpson, who once stated that gays could "grow into heterosexuality over time" and Vaughan Johnson, who said in 1999 that homosexuality was "totally immoral", "anti-family" and "against what Jesus Christ put us on this planet for" before stating he had become "tolerant" of homosexuality in 2002. Former LNP member and subsequent Katter's Australian Party member Shane Knuth stated that his fellow "happy clappers" were a powerful lobby group within the Liberal National Party. Religious conservatives have featured across the political spectrum in Queensland, including political independents and minor parties, the anti-LGBT Katter's Australian Party and the largely LGBT-friendly Labor Party.

However, the impact of social conservatism in the state has declined over time, particularly in metropolitan areas such as the state capital Brisbane and the surrounding south-east Queensland region. At the 2016 Australian federal election, the division of Brisbane made Australian history as the first electorate where both candidates from the major parties were openly gay, while one of the minor party candidates was transgender.

Following the victory of the LNP at the 2012 state election, the party enacted several policy changes that were criticised by gay rights advocates. These included: defunding Queensland Association for Healthy Communities, the state's sole LGBTI health organisation, on the grounds that it had developed an excessively political focus; downgrading civil partnerships to a "registered relationships" scheme; and refusing to remove the gay panic defence from the state's criminal law.

Labor defeated the LNP at the 2015 state election, achieving re-election in the 2017 and 2020 polls. During its term in office, the Labor government has introduced several pro-LGBTI policies, such as reinstating civil partnerships, equalising the age of consent at 16, allowing singles and same-sex couples to adopt children, abolishing the common-law gay panic defence, repealing the "transgender divorce law" and "surgery law", restoring funding to the LGBTI Legal Service, removing anti-discrimination law exemptions which allowed ART service providers to discriminate on the basis of sexuality or relationship status, allowing gay men with historical convictions for consensual adult gay sex to clear their criminal records and outlawing gay conversion therapy.

In April 2022, Katter's Australian Party Robbie Katter said he will move a bill to ban transgender athletes from women's sport in the state. In May 2022, he proposed a motion which was voted down 49 votes to 33. The opposition Liberal National Party of Queensland voted with him.

== Summary table ==
Same-sex sexual activity legal	Yes (since 1991 for men; always for women)
Equal age of consent	Yes (since 2016)
Gender-affirming healthcare available to individuals under 18 years old	No (banned since 2025)
Implemented birth certificate law reforms without impediments	Yes (since 2024)
Anti-discrimination state laws that explicitly includes sexual orientation, gender identity and sex characteristics	Yes Yes (since 2002)
Hate crime laws that explicitly includes sexual orientation, gender identity and sex characteristics	Yes Yes (since 2024)
Laws that protect intersex individuals from surgical procedures	No
Laws against LGBT vilification	Yes
Gay sex criminal records expungement (that are listed prior to 1991) and also the abolishment of the common law gay panic defense	Yes
Recognition in state law of same-sex couples as domestic partners	Yes (de facto since 2002; civil partnerships since 2012)
Full joint/step adoption as well as full parentage from both IVF and altruistic surrogacy procedures for same-sex couples	Yes
Conversion therapy on minors outlawed	Yes (since 2020; prohibits any health provider, registered or unregistered, including doctors, nurses, psychologists, counsellors, naturopaths and social workers, from administering defined "conversion practices" in any setting, whether the service is paid or unpaid.)
Same-sex marriages	Yes (since 2017)
MSMs allowed to donate blood	Yes (if monogamous as a condition since 2026)

== See also ==
- Transgender rights in Australia
- LGBTQ rights in New South Wales
- LGBTQ rights in South Australia
- LGBTQ rights in Victoria
- Intersex rights in Australia
- LGBTQ rights in Australia
- Australian Marriage Law Postal Survey
- Same-sex marriage in Australia
