= Electoral results for the district of Cleveland =

Electoral results for Cleveland, Queensland, Australia

This is a list of electoral results for the electoral district of Cleveland in Queensland state elections.

== Members for Cleveland ==
Member	Party	Term
Darryl Briskey	Labor	1992–2006
Phil Weightman	Labor	2006–2009
Mark Robinson	Liberal National	2009–2017

== Election results ==
=== Elections in the 2010s ===
2015 Queensland state election: Cleveland
Party	Candidate	Votes	%	±%
Liberal National	Mark Robinson	16,434	52.14	−9.75
Labor	Tracey Huges	11,288	35.82	+9.37
Greens	Amanda White	3,795	12.04	+4.47
Total formal votes		31,517	98.15	+0.13
Informal votes		593	1.85	−0.13
Turnout		32,110	91.88	−1.13
Two-party-preferred result
Liberal National	Mark Robinson	16,929	55.45	−12.65
Labor	Tracey Huges	13,599	44.55	+12.65
Liberal National hold		Swing	−12.65	

2012 Queensland state election: Cleveland
Party	Candidate	Votes	%	±%
Liberal National	Mark Robinson	18,497	61.89	+15.88
Labor	Jo Briskey	7,903	26.44	−17.14
Greens	Brad Scott	2,263	7.57	+0.54
Independent	Ronald Lambert	1,223	4.09	+4.09
Total formal votes		29,886	98.02	−0.21
Informal votes		603	1.98	+0.21
Turnout		30,489	93.01	+0.44
Two-party-preferred result
Liberal National	Mark Robinson	19,185	68.10	+17.82
Labor	Jo Briskey	8,986	31.90	−17.82
Liberal National hold		Swing	+17.82	

=== Elections in the 2000s ===
2009 Queensland state election: Cleveland
Party	Candidate	Votes	%	±%
Liberal National	Mark Robinson	13,199	46.0	+5.3
Labor	Phil Weightman	12,502	43.6	+0.2
Greens	Carissa Patchett	2,016	7.0	−1.3
DS4SEQ	Richard Jemison	968	3.4	+3.4
Total formal votes		28,685	98.0	
Informal votes		517	2.0	
Turnout		29,202	92.6	
Two-party-preferred result
Liberal National	Mark Robinson	13,846	50.3	+1.5
Labor	Phil Weightman	13,691	49.7	−1.5
Liberal National gain from Labor		Swing	+1.5	

2006 Queensland state election: Cleveland
Party	Candidate	Votes	%	±%
Labor	Phil Weightman	10,754	42.4	−11.5
Liberal	Andrew Trim	10,545	41.6	+3.2
Greens	Robyn Thomas	2,218	8.8	+1.1
Independent	Shane Boese	1,830	7.2	+7.2
Total formal votes		25,347	98.2	+0.3
Informal votes		467	1.8	−0.3
Turnout		25,814	91.7	−0.4
Two-party-preferred result
Labor	Phil Weightman	11,846	50.5	−8.2
Liberal	Andrew Trim	11,593	49.5	+8.2
Labor hold		Swing	−8.2	

2004 Queensland state election: Cleveland
Party	Candidate	Votes	%	±%
Labor	Darryl Briskey	13,432	53.9	−3.7
Liberal	David Fenwick	9,575	38.4	+13.4
Greens	Thomas Petitt	1,908	7.7	+7.7
Total formal votes		24,915	97.9	+0.4
Informal votes		529	2.1	−0.4
Turnout		25,444	92.1	−1.5
Two-party-preferred result
Labor	Darryl Briskey	14,115	58.7	−8.0
Liberal	David Fenwick	9,946	41.3	+8.0
Labor hold		Swing	−8.0	

2001 Queensland state election: Cleveland
Party	Candidate	Votes	%	±%
Labor	Darryl Briskey	13,529	57.6	+14.4
Liberal	Lynne Friis	5,880	25.0	−6.4
Independent	John Barton	4,099	17.4	+17.4
Total formal votes		23,508	97.5	
Informal votes		613	2.5	
Turnout		24,121	93.6	
Two-party-preferred result
Labor	Darryl Briskey	14,300	66.7	+10.9
Liberal	Lynne Friis	7,152	33.3	−10.9
Labor hold		Swing	+10.9	

=== Elections in the 1990s ===
1998 Queensland state election: Cleveland
Party	Candidate	Votes	%	±%
Labor	Darryl Briskey	10,506	43.7	−3.8
Liberal	Damien Massingham	7,391	30.8	−12.7
One Nation	Bluey Bostock	4,644	19.3	+19.3
Democrats	Jenny Van Rooyen	833	3.5	−5.5
Independent	Phil Ball	477	2.0	+2.0
Reform	Barry Archie	176	0.7	+0.7
Total formal votes		24,027	98.6	+0.1
Informal votes		352	1.4	−0.1
Turnout		24,379	93.9	+1.5
Two-party-preferred result
Labor	Darryl Briskey	12,490	56.4	+4.0
Liberal	Damien Massingham	9,648	43.6	−4.0
Labor hold		Swing	+4.0	

1995 Queensland state election: Cleveland
Party	Candidate	Votes	%	±%
Labor	Darryl Briskey	10,027	47.5	−7.6
Liberal	Peter Turnbull	9,167	43.5	+16.5
Democrats	Janice Potter	1,899	9.0	+9.0
Total formal votes		21,093	98.4	+0.8
Informal votes		336	1.6	−0.8
Turnout		21,429	92.4	
Two-party-preferred result
Labor	Darryl Briskey	10,873	52.5	−5.0
Liberal	Peter Turnbull	9,857	47.5	+5.0
Labor hold		Swing	−5.0	

1992 Queensland state election: Cleveland
Party	Candidate	Votes	%	±%
Labor	Darryl Briskey	10,358	55.2	+2.6
Liberal	Eddie Santagiuliana	5,055	26.9	+8.2
National	Paul Asher	3,360	17.9	−3.8
Total formal votes		18,773	97.6	
Informal votes		453	2.4	
Turnout		19,226	92.5	
Two-party-preferred result
Labor	Darryl Briskey	10,639	57.5	−2.7
Liberal	Eddie Santagiuliana	7,874	42.5	+42.5
Labor hold		Swing	−2.7	
