= Electoral results for the district of Oodgeroo =

Queensland, Australia, district election results

This is a list of electoral results for the electoral district of Oodgeroo in Queensland state elections.

== Members for Oodgeroo ==
Member	Party	Term
Mark Robinson	Liberal National	2017–2024
Amanda Stoker	Liberal National	2024–present

== Election results ==
=== Elections in the 2020s ===
2024 Queensland state election: Oodgeroo
Party	Candidate	Votes	%	±%
Liberal National	Amanda Stoker	17,360	55.69	+14.79
Labor	Irene Henley	9,002	28.88	+0.98
Greens	Callen Sorensen Karklis	3,010	9.66	+4.36
One Nation	Justin Sheil	1,800	5.77	+2.47
Total formal votes		31,172	97.03	
Informal votes		954	2.97	
Turnout		32,126	91.67	
Two-party-preferred result
Liberal National	Amanda Stoker	19,257	61.78	+7.28
Labor	Irene Henley	11,915	38.22	−7.28
Liberal National hold		Swing	+7.28	

2020 Queensland state election: Oodgeroo
Party	Candidate	Votes	%	±%
Liberal National	Mark Robinson	12,083	40.87	−11.56
Labor	Irene Henley	8,231	27.84	−5.99
Independent	Claire Richardson	6,349	21.48	+21.48
Greens	Ian Mazlin	1,575	5.33	−8.41
One Nation	Douglas Chapman	984	3.33	+3.33
Informed Medical Options	Kirstyn Marriott	341	1.15	+1.15
Total formal votes		29,563	97.06	+1.48
Informal votes		894	2.94	−1.48
Turnout		30,457	92.20	+1.80
Two-party-preferred result
Liberal National	Mark Robinson	16,105	54.48	−2.76
Labor	Irene Henley	13,458	45.52	+2.76
Liberal National hold		Swing	−2.76	

=== Elections in the 2010s ===
2017 Queensland state election: Oodgeroo
Party	Candidate	Votes	%	±%
Liberal National	Mark Robinson	14,549	52.4	+0.1
Labor	Tony Austin	9,389	33.8	−1.8
Greens	Brad Scott	3,812	13.7	+1.7
Total formal votes		27,750	95.6	−2.6
Informal votes		1,282	4.4	+2.6
Turnout		29,032	90.4	+0.5
Two-party-preferred result
Liberal National	Mark Robinson	15,883	57.2	+1.5
Labor	Tony Austin	11,867	42.8	−1.5
Liberal National hold		Swing	+1.5	
