= Briskey =

Briskey is a surname. Notable people with the surname include:

- Darryl Briskey (born 1955), former Australian politician
- Ernest J. Briskey (1931–2006), American food scientist
- Jo Briskey, Australian politician

== See also ==
- Brisket
