= 1985 Redlands state by-election =

A by-election was held in the Legislative Assembly of Queensland seat of Redlands on 2 November 1985. It was triggered by the death of sitting National Party member John Goleby.

The seat was retained by the National Party with the election of candidate Paul Clauson.

== Background ==
John Goleby was elected to state parliament at the 1974 state election when he won the seat of Redlands for the National Party as part of what was a landslide win for the then National-Liberal coalition. He held the seat continuously thereafter, becoming Minister for Water Resources and Maritime Services in 1982.

Goleby died in a tractor accident on his farm on 10 September 1985.

== Candidates ==
To defend the seat the National Party chose "little known" solicitor Paul Clauson, who had joined the party only four days before he was preselected. The Liberal Party—no longer in coalition with the Nationals—chose nurseryman and landscape gardener Max Bolte as their candidate, cousin of former Victorian Premier Henry Bolte.

But the chief opponent for the National Party was the Labor Party, who had last held the seat in 1974. They chose local solicitor Con Sciacca, who had been twice defeated by Goleby as the Labor candidate for Redlands at the 1977 state election and 1980 state election. Sciacca defeated two other candidates vying for Labor preselection, one of whom was state party secretary Peter Beattie. Beattie would later enter parliament as the member for Brisbane Central at the 1989 state election as serve as Premier of Queensland from 1998 to 2007. It was said that the preselection drama did Labor no favours at the start of the campaign.

== Campaign ==
The campaign was dominated by several issues. Firstly, the National government promised or proposed a nursing home, a $3 million 40-bed hospital, extra police and a $12.1 million rail link to Cleveland during the campaign. The Labor and Liberal parties, meanwhile, focused on the various issues which had dogged the government over preceding months. Other factors were the Liberals' determination, after their relegation to minor party status at the 1983 election, to revive their own fortunes, and several industrial relations disputes which had taken place during the year.

== Results ==
National Party candidate Paul Clauson prevailed narrowly over the Labor Party's Con Sciacca. Clauson trailed significantly on the primary vote but overcame that deficit in large part due to preferences from Liberal Party voters.

Redlands state by-election, 1985
Party	Candidate	Votes	%	±%
Labor	Con Sciacca	12,650	43.28	+1.88
National	Paul Clauson	10,877	37.21	–8.78
Liberal	Max Bolte	4,169	14.26	+7.85
Democrats	Richard May	991	3.39	–2.81
Independent	Bernard Irving	366	1.25	+1.25
Anti-Hashish Labor Party	Thomas Aeon-Masterson	106	0.36	+0.36
Union Solidarity Party	Jackson Brown	72	0.25	+0.25
Total formal votes		29,231	98.28	–0.36
Informal votes		513	1.72	+0.36
Turnout		29,744	90.75	–2.05
Two-party-preferred result
National	Paul Clauson	14,722	50.36	–3.51
Labor	Con Sciacca	14,508	49.64	+3.51
National hold		Swing	–3.51	

== Aftermath ==
Clauson was re-elected to a full term at the 1986 state election, after which he became Attorney-General and Minister for Justice. He was defeated at the 1989 state election.

Labor candidate Con Sciacca won election to the Australian House of Representatives at the 1987 federal election for the overlapping federal seat of Bowman. Sciacca served as Minister for Veterans' Affairs in the government of Paul Keating.

== See also ==
- List of Queensland state by-elections
