= Amanda Stoker =

Australian politician (born 1982)

The Honourable Amanda Stoker MP
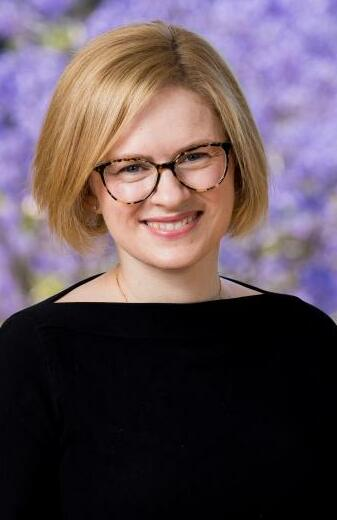

Minister for Families, Seniors and Disabilities of Queensland
- Incumbent
- Assumed office 24 October 2026
- Premier: David Crisafulli
- Preceded by: Amanda Camm

Minister for Child Safety of Queensland
- Incumbent
- Assumed office 24 October 2026
- Premier: David Crisafulli
- Preceded by: Amanda Camm

Minister for the Prevention of Domestic and Family Violence of Queensland
- Incumbent
- Assumed office 24 October 2026
- Premier: David Crisafulli
- Preceded by: Amanda Camm

Assistant Minister for Finance, Trade, Employment and Training of Queensland
- In office 14 November 2024 – 24 October 2026
- Minister: Ros Bates
- Premier: David Crisafulli
- Preceded by: Position established
- Succeeded by: Natalie Marr

Member of the Queensland Legislative Assembly for Oodgeroo
- Incumbent
- Assumed office 26 October 2024
- Preceded by: Mark Robinson

Assistant Minister to the Attorney-General
- In office 22 December 2020 – 23 May 2022
- Prime Minister: Scott Morrison
- Minister: Christian Porter (2020–2021); Michaelia Cash (2021–2022)
- Preceded by: Position established
- Succeeded by: Matt Thistlethwaite (as Assistant Minister for the Republic)

Assistant Minister for Industrial Relations
- In office 30 March 2021 – 23 May 2022
- Prime Minister: Scott Morrison
- Minister: Michaelia Cash
- Preceded by: Position established
- Succeeded by: Position abolished

Assistant Minister for Women
- In office 30 March 2021 – 23 May 2022
- Prime Minister: Scott Morrison
- Minister: Marise Payne
- Preceded by: Position established
- Succeeded by: Position abolished

Senator for Queensland
- In office 21 March 2018 – 30 June 2022
- Preceded by: George Brandis
- Succeeded by: Penny Allman-Payne

Personal details
- Born: Amanda Jane Fell; 30 October 1982 (age 44) Liverpool, New South Wales, Australia
- Party: Liberal National Party
- Other political affiliations: Liberal Party
- Spouse: Adam Stoker (m. 2005)
- Children: 3
- Education: University of Sydney
- Profession: Barrister
- Portfolio: Assistant Minister for Industrial Relations, for Women & to the Attorney-General

Amanda Jane Stoker (née Fell; born 30 October 1982) is an Australian politician who served as a Senator for Queensland from 2018 until 2022. She is a member of the Liberal National Party of Queensland (LNP) and sat with the Liberal Party in federal parliament. She was appointed to the Senate after the retirement of George Brandis. Stoker held the ministerial portfolios of Assistant Minister to the Attorney-General, Assistant Minister for Industrial Relations and Assistant Minister for Women in the Morrison government. Stoker was unsuccessful in her re-election bid in the 2022 federal election and departed the Senate on 30 June 2022.

In the 2024 Queensland state election, she was elected to the Parliament of Queensland for Oodgeroo.

== Early life and education ==
Stoker was born in the Sydney suburb of Liverpool to working-class parents, Mark and Cornelia Ingrid Fell. Her father was born in Australia and her mother in Sweden. She grew up in Campbelltown, an outer-southern suburb of Sydney. In her first speech in the Senate she explained: "My dad is a plumber, drainer, gas fitter. He had his own small business. My mum worked in a shop as a retail assistant." She completed her HSC at Hurlstone Agricultural High School before studying arts and law at Sydney University, graduating with first-class honours.

== Legal career ==
Stoker began her career as a clerk and solicitor in Brisbane with Minter Ellison in 2006. She went on to serve as a Commonwealth prosecutor, as well as a judge's associate to Philip McMurdo in the Supreme Court of Queensland, and to Ian Callinan in the High Court of Australia.

Prior to her appointment to the Senate, Stoker was a member of Level Twenty-Seven Chambers and a sessional academic at Central Queensland University. She was vice-president of the Women Lawyers Association of Queensland from 2016 to 2018.

During her legal career, Stoker had a particular interest in administrative law and statutory interpretation.

From 2014 to 2018, Stoker was a director at the non-profit, Brisbane-based conservative think tank, the Australian Institute for Progress (AIP). During her time there, the AIP was a critic of anti-mining advocacy groups holding charitable status, and hosted a visit to Brisbane by climate science denier Patrick Moore. Also during Stoker's time, the AIP opposed tobacco plain packaging and criticised the World Health Organization's proposed international convention on tobacco.

== Political career ==
In 2010, Stoker was the treasurer of the Young LNP. She was concurrently a member of the Liberal National Party Policy Standing Committee and chair of the Media and Communications Policy Committee from 2009 to 2016. Stoker unsuccessfully sought LNP pre-selection for the electoral district of Cleveland at the 2009 Queensland state election, and was an unsuccessful LNP Senate candidate at the 2013 federal election. She was a member of the party's state executive from 2014 to 2017.

On 10 March 2018, the Queensland LNP chose Stoker from a field of 12 candidates to succeed high-profile cabinet member George Brandis as a senator for Queensland. Endorsed by the LNP State Executive Council, she did not face a vote by rank-and-file members. The Australian reported that LNP members were threatening to push for gender quotas if the party did not preselect a woman, and the Daily Mercury reported that LNP sources had said Stoker was one of the standouts, because she was based in Brisbane and would also increase the LNP's percentage of females. The LNP president denied gender was a motive, saying Stoker was chosen on merit. Stoker was appointed to the casual vacancy left by Brandis on 21 March 2018 and she was sworn in as a senator the following day. Prior to Stoker's appointment to the senate, all federal LNP senators were men.

On 22 December 2020, Stoker was appointed as the Assistant Minister to the Attorney-General. On 30 March 2021, she was appointed to additional positions of Assistant Minister for Women and Assistant Minister for Industrial Relations. In reference to her elevation Prime Minister Morrison said: "she's one of the most bright and intelligent people to come into this Parliament and I was thrilled to be able to bring her into the Executive so early in her Parliamentary career". Grace Tame, named 2021 Australian of the Year for her advocacy for survivors of sexual assault, criticised Morrison's appointment of Stoker to Assistant Minister for Women saying he had exhibited either very poor judgment, or cultural calculation in elevating a conservative who had "aimed at falsifying all counts of sexual abuse on campuses across the nation". Stoker said Tame's comments were "passionate but not informed", adding the comments did not correspond with Stoker's long history of work in the area of women's safety.

In May 2021, a squabble broke out between Stoker and the LNP Queensland state council when she was relegated to the third-spot on the Senate voting ticket for the 2022 federal election. This ballot position ended up costing Stoker her seat, as The Greens won a Queensland Senate seat at the expense of the LNP.

Stoker commenced hosting her own weekly program on Sky News Australia called Sunday with Stoker in January 2023. However, she stepped down from the role in October 2023 after it was announced that she would be contesting the 2024 Queensland state election as a candidate in the seat of Oodgeroo.

== Political positions ==
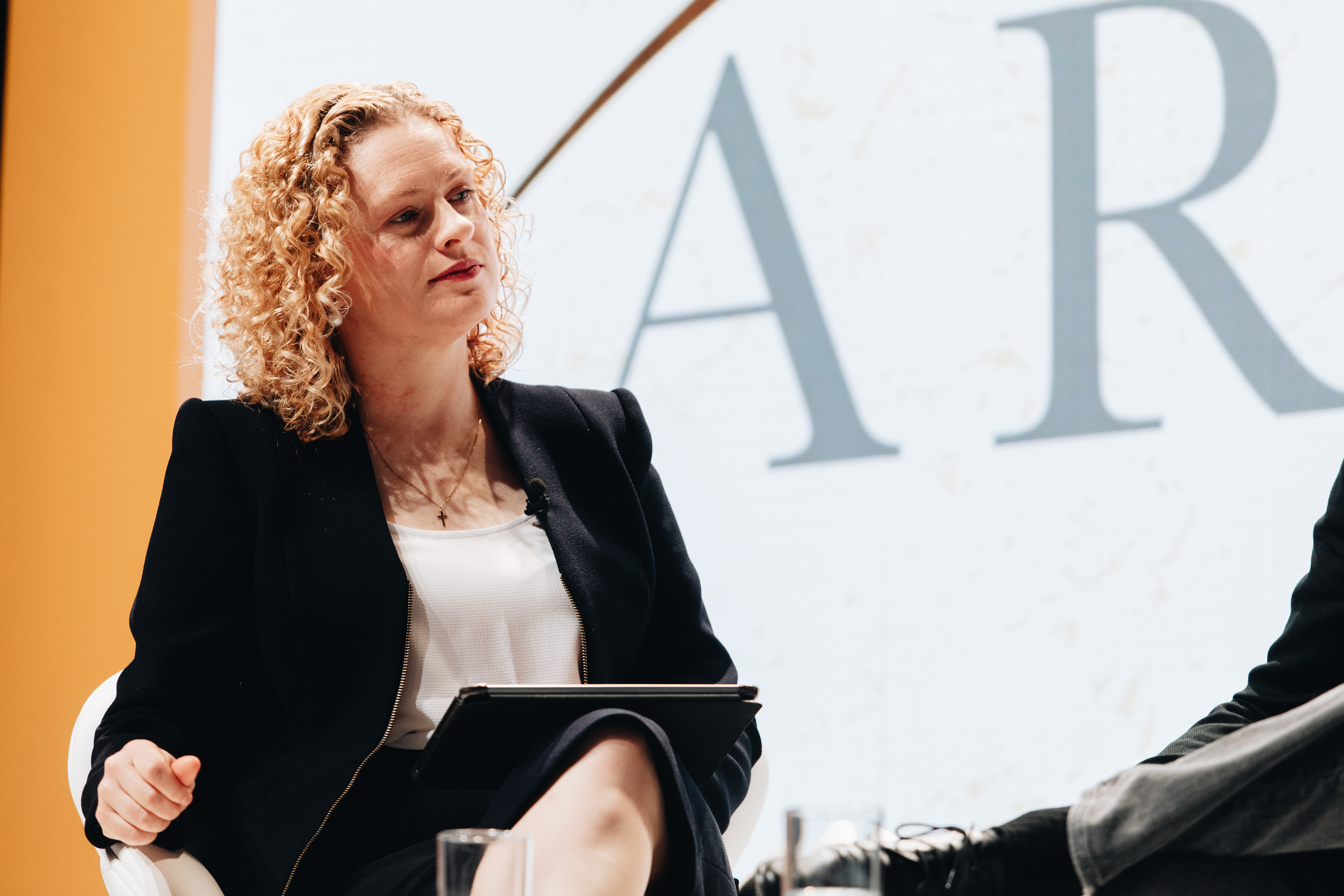
Amanda Stoker in a panel discussion at Alliance for Responsible Citizenship in London, 30 October 2023

Stoker is a member of the National Right faction of the Liberal Party.

In 2020, The Australian named her a "free speech champion and rising star of conservative politics". She is part of the Liberal Party's conservative faction and is aligned with the LNP's Christian right. Stoker is a self-described "proud conservative" Christian who believes Christian values are "under attack". Her political heroes are former prime minister John Howard and former UK leader Margaret Thatcher. In 2019, Crikey reported that she is a social and fiscal conservative who had positioned herself as a champion of free speech and religious freedom. She has claimed that conservatives are "misunderstood". Stoker has been a speaker at a number of centre-right conservative conferences.

Stoker has spoken out against abortion and has opposed the introduction of voluntary euthanasia legislation. Stoker is a proponent of the introduction of a "religious discrimination bill".

Stoker has advocated the repeal of section 18C of the Racial Discrimination Act. In 2018 she said: "I think 18C has got to go. I think 18C is a drag on our society." The Labor Opposition responded by saying that would "water down protections against racist hate speech".

Stoker blames unions for the casualisation of workplaces, and argues against raising minimum wages and penalty rates because doing so would "reduce job opportunities for those most in need". She has also described unfair dismissal laws as a "block to growth".

Stoker supports the development of an Australian nuclear energy industry. She opposed the Government ban on the personal import of liquid nicotine used for vaping.

=== On sex and gender ===
Stoker has implied that women with children were "baggage" from an employer's perspective. She has pushed for nannies to be tax-deductible. In July 2021, she was quoted as commending changes to the LNP constitution to take a "zero tolerance" approach to sexual misconduct, as part of a new complaints and investigation process. She said that it was an "important signal to women that their safety matters to the LNP".

In 2020, Stoker faced criticism when she said former Queensland LNP leader Deb Frecklington "should not be playing the gender card" by speaking out against bullying from within the party.

She has opposed the transgender rights movement, and has said that her political opponents prioritise the rights of the LGBTIQ community over the "rights to freedom of conscience, religion and speech". and has stressed the importance of restricting transgender people from playing sport, and removing the ability for transgender children to access gender-affirming care. Additionally, Stoker told The Australian that everyone was entitled to support and respect, but that inclusion of trans adults could not "mean we neglect our duties to children." In 2020, Stoker launched a petition against "dangerous and radical ideas" and "completely unreasonable" demands of the transgender activist lobby.

In 2018, Stoker opposed a proposed bill to remove an exemption in the Sex Discrimination Act 1984 that would allow religious schools to expel students on the basis of their sexual orientation and gender identity. In articulating her opposition to the proposal, she expressed concern that children may want "to run a gay club within the school". She has claimed that sexuality is a "choice".

=== "Knee on the throat" comments ===
In 2020, during a televised interview on Sky News, Stoker criticised Queensland's decision to close its borders during the COVID-19 pandemic, saying that Premier Annastacia Palaszczuk "knows she is absolutely choking our economy by having these borders shut – she is the knee on the throat of businesses of Queensland, stopping them from breathing". Indigenous Labor Senator Malarndirri McCarthy said the comments invoked a reference to the murder of George Floyd. Stoker's spokesman had initially said she would not be backing away from her comments, but in a subsequent speech to parliament, Stoker apologised to anyone genuinely hurt or offended, stating it was an "unfortunate turn of phrase" used to emphasise her hurt for local Queensland businesses harmed by prolonged lockdowns.

=== "Mandy Jane" ===
In 2020, Stoker admitted to using the pseudonym "Mandy Jane" to post comments in the third person on her own official Facebook site which defended and argued for the senator's views on topics including race, family law and religious freedom. Posts using Stoker's "Mandy Jane" profile referred to Stoker in the third person and copied the senator's own comments, while changing the pronouns to make it appear that they were from a different person. The Facebook profile photo of Mandy Jane was that of a storybook character. Stoker's spokesman said the "Mandy Jane" account was the senator's personal profile but did not concede that she should have disclosed that before posting the material on her own page.

== Personal life ==
Stoker lives with her family in Redland City, east of Brisbane. She married her husband, Adam, in 2005 and they have three daughters. She is a Christian and attends an Anglican church in inner-city Brisbane.
