= Electoral district of Oodgeroo =

State electoral district of Queensland, Australia

Oodgeroo Queensland—Legislative Assembly
- Map of the electoral district of Oodgeroo, 2017
- State: Queensland
- Dates current: 2017–present
- MP: Amanda Stoker
- Party: Liberal National Party
- Namesake: Oodgeroo Noonuccal
- Electors: 33,034 (2020)
- Area: 308 km^{2} (118.9 sq mi)
- Demographic: Outer-metropolitan
- Coordinates: 27.5035°S 153.3597°E
Electorates around Oodgeroo:
Capalaba	Moreton Bay	Redcliffe
Capalaba	Oodgeroo	Coral Sea
Redlands	Redlands	Redlands

Oodgeroo is an electoral district of the Legislative Assembly in the Australian state of Queensland. It was created in the 2017 redistribution, and was won at that year's election by Mark Robinson. It was named after Indigenous activist and poet Oodgeroo Noonuccal.

It largely replaces the abolished district of Cleveland. Located in City of Redland south-east of Brisbane, Oodgeroo consists of the suburbs of Birkdale, Wellington Point, Ormiston and Cleveland. It also covers the area of North Stradbroke Island.

From results of the 2015 election, Oodgeroo was estimated to be a marginal seat for the Liberal National Party with a margin of 5.7%.

== Members for Oodgeroo ==
Member	Party	Term
Mark Robinson	Liberal National	2017–2024
Amanda Stoker	Liberal National	2024–present

== Election results ==
2024 Queensland state election: Oodgeroo
Party	Candidate	Votes	%	±%
Liberal National	Amanda Stoker	17,360	55.69	+14.79
Labor	Irene Henley	9,002	28.88	+0.98
Greens	Callen Sorensen Karklis	3,010	9.66	+4.36
One Nation	Justin Sheil	1,800	5.77	+2.47
Total formal votes		31,172	97.03	
Informal votes		954	2.97	
Turnout		32,126	91.67	
Two-party-preferred result
Liberal National	Amanda Stoker	19,257	61.78	+7.28
Labor	Irene Henley	11,915	38.22	−7.28
Liberal National hold		Swing	+7.28	

== See also ==
- Electoral districts of Queensland
- Members of the Queensland Legislative Assembly by year
- Category:Members of the Queensland Legislative Assembly by name
