= Phil Weightman =

Australian politician

Member of the Queensland Legislative Assembly for Cleveland
- In office 9 September 2006 – 20 March 2009
- Preceded by: Darryl Briskey
- Succeeded by: Mark Robinson

Personal details
- Born: Phillip John Weightman; 10 February 1958 (age 68) Innisfail, Queensland, Australia
- Party: Labor
- Occupation: Police officer

Phillip John Weightman (born 10 February 1958) is an Australian politician. He was a Labor member of the Legislative Assembly of Queensland from 2006 to 2009, representing the district of Cleveland.

Parliament of Queensland
Preceded by Darryl Briskey	Member for Cleveland; 2006–2009	Succeeded by Mark Robinson
