= John Budd (politician) =

Australian politician

Member of the Queensland Legislative Assembly for Redlands
- In office 19 September 1992 – 15 July 1995
- Preceded by: Darryl Briskey
- Succeeded by: John Hegarty

Personal details
- Born: John Andrew Budd; 18 April 1950 (age 75) Coventry, England
- Party: Labor
- Occupation: Political advisor

John Andrew Budd (born 18 April 1950) is a former politician in Australia.

He was born at Coventry in England and worked as an adviser to David Beddall, the federal Minister for Small Business and Customs. In 1992, he was elected to the Queensland Legislative Assembly as the Labor member for Redlands. He was defeated in 1995 by a National Party candidate.

Parliament of Queensland
Preceded by Darryl Briskey	Member for Redlands; 1992–1995	Succeeded by John Hegarty
