= Kim Richards (politician) =

Australian politician

Member of the Queensland Legislative Assembly for Redlands
- In office 25 November 2017 – 26 October 2024
- Preceded by: Matt McEachan
- Succeeded by: Rebecca Young

Personal details
- Born: 31 August 1971 (age 54)
- Party: Labor
- Children: 1
- Website: www.kimrichards.org

Kim Elizabeth Richards (born 31 August 1971) is an Australian politician. She served as the Labor member for Redlands in the Queensland Legislative Assembly from 2017 until her defeat at the 2024 state election.

Parliament of Queensland
Preceded by Matt McEachan	Member for Redlands; 2017–2024	Succeeded by Rebecca Young
