= Rebecca Young (Australian politician) =

Australian politician

Rebecca Young MP

Member of the Queensland Legislative Assembly for Redlands
- Incumbent
- Assumed office 26 October 2024
- Preceded by: Kim Richards

Personal details
- Party: Liberal National

Rebecca Young is an Australian politician. She was elected member of the Legislative Assembly of Queensland for Redlands in the 2024 Queensland state election.

Young was educated at Victoria Point and at Ormiston College.

She serves in the Crisafulli ministry as Assistant Minister to the Deputy Premier and Assistant Minister for Planning, Housing and Better Regulation.
