= John Hegarty (politician) =

Australian politician

Member of the Queensland Legislative Assembly for Redlands
- In office 15 July 1995 – 17 February 2001
- Preceded by: John Budd
- Succeeded by: John English

Personal details
- Born: John Joseph Hegarty; 16 September 1947 (age 78)
- Party: National
- Occupation: Insurance broker, soldier

John Joseph Hegarty (born 16 September 1947) is a former Australian politician. He was the National Party member for Redlands in the Legislative Assembly of Queensland from 1995 to 2001.

Hegarty served in Vietnam from 1967 to 1968 and was part of the army reserve from 1969 to 1994. He was a commissioned officer from 1971. He also worked as an insurance consultant. Following his election in 1995, he was a National Party backbencher in the Borbidge Government. In June 1998 he became Deputy Opposition Whip, serving until his defeat in 2001.

Parliament of Queensland
| Preceded by John Budd | Member for Redlands; 1995–2001 | Succeeded by John English |
