= Cairns Tropical Pride =

LGBT pride parade and festival in Australia

- Genre: LGBTQ Pride Festival
- Begins: Late September
- Ends: Early October
- Frequency: Annually
- Locations: Cairns, Queensland, Australia
- Years active: 12
- Inaugurated: 2006
- Most recent: 2024

Cairns Tropical Pride was an annual LGBTQ pride parade and festival in Cairns, Australia, and the largest LGBT event in Tropical North Queensland. The first event was held in 2006, and was originally held in conjunction with the Cairns Festival before changing its name for 2015 and 2016 to "Tropical Mardi Gras" and its timing to October. The event reverted to Cairns Tropical Pride for 2017.

The festival featured a variety of activities, including boat cruises, pool parties, art exhibitions and a Fair Day with a renowned Dog Show, community forums, drag and fashion shows, art exhibition and community recognition awards. In 2016, the Fair Day also introduced an annual same-sex wedding expo.

In 2019, the organization's board voted to discontinue the festival due to a lack of support, funds, and volunteers. Nevertheless, the Queensland AIDS Council foundation decided to take charge of organizing the event under the name Cairns Pride Festival from that year onwards after consulting the local LGBT community about the continuity of the event and obtaining widespread support for its realization.

The 15th edition of the festival, held in 2021. It began with the inauguration of a rainbow pedestrian crossing by local councilor Amy Eden. The celebration also included a week-long art exhibition, a beach party, a dog show, and a fair day that featured cultural, culinary, and musical activities, including a performance by the Australian band Shakaya.

In 2024, the festival was held from October 4 to 13 and continued to be organized by the Queensland Council for LGBTI Health.

== See also ==
- LGBT rights in Australia
- List of LGBT events
