= Peter Callaghan =

Australian judge

Peter Callaghan SC is an Australian judge. He has been a Judge of the Supreme Court of Queensland since 10 February 2020.

Callaghan graduated from the University of Queensland with a Bachelor of Arts and Bachelor of Laws (Honours). He was admitted as a barrister in 1986, where he commenced at the Commonwealth Office of the Director of Public Prosecutions, first as a lists clerk, and eventually as a Crown Prosecutor. In 1991, he joined the Queensland Office of the Director of Public Prosecutions as a Senior Crown Prosecutor.

Callaghan joined the private bar in 1995, practising principally in criminal and administrative law. His first brief as a barrister was as defence counsel in the high-profile trial of serial killer Ivan Milat, also known as the ‘backpacker murderer’. Notwithstanding the ultimate conviction of Milat for 7 counts of murder, the trial Judge acknowledged that Milat’s legal representatives had displayed tactical ability of a high order and conducted Mr Milat’s defence in a skilful and responsible manner.

Other notable cases Callaghan has been involved in as a barrister include representing the family of Aboriginal man Mulrunji Doomadgee at the inquest into his death in custody on Palm Island in 2004, and appearing as Senior Counsel Assisting in the Queensland Floods Commission of Inquiry and the Royal Commission into the Protection and Detention of Children in the Northern Territory. Callaghan also acted in the prosecution of Johnny Depp’s then-spouse Amber Heard when she committed quarantine offences by bringing her two dogs into Australia.

Callaghan was appointed Senior Counsel in 2004. He was one of only three barristers in Queensland to retain the appellation of ‘Senior Counsel’ by electing not to adopt the title ‘Queen's Counsel’ in 2013. As a member of the Queensland Bar Association, Callaghan has also participated in the Association's delegation to Papua New Guinea for the training of local lawyers.

Justice Callaghan was appointed a judge of the Supreme Court of Queensland on 10 February 2020. At the time of his appointment, Callaghan was regarded as “one of Queensland’s most respected and experienced barristers.”

Notable cases Callaghan has presided over on the Supreme Court include proceedings involving businessmen and politician Clive Palmer.
