= John English (Australian politician) =

Australian politician

Deputy Speaker of the Queensland Legislative Assembly
- In office 11 October 2006 – 21 April 2009
- Preceded by: Jim Fouras
- Succeeded by: Jason O'Brien

Member of the Queensland Legislative Assembly for Redlands
- In office 17 February 2001 – 20 March 2009
- Preceded by: John Hegarty
- Succeeded by: Peter Dowling

Personal details
- Born: John Michael English; 16 December 1962 (age 63) Maleny, Queensland, Australia
- Party: Labor
- Occupation: Police officer

John Michael English (born 16 December 1962) is an Australian politician. He was a Labor member of the Legislative Assembly of Queensland from 2001 to 2009, representing the district of Redlands. He was Deputy Speaker of the Parliament from 2006 to 2009 and also served on the Parliamentary Crime & Misconduct Committee and the Public Accounts Committee.

English was born in Maleny, Queensland. Prior to his election he was a police officer.

Parliament of Queensland
Preceded by John Hegarty	Member for Redlands; 2001–2006	Succeeded by Peter Dowling
