= Ted Baldwin (politician) =

Australian politician

Member of the Queensland Legislative Assembly for Logan
- In office 17 May 1969 – 27 May 1972
- Preceded by: Dick Wood
- Succeeded by: Seat abolished

Member of the Queensland Legislative Assembly for Redlands
- In office 27 May 1972 – 7 December 1974
- Preceded by: New seat
- Succeeded by: John Goleby

Personal details
- Born: Edgar Allan Baldwin; 25 September 1922 Moregatta, Queensland, Australia
- Died: 1 January 2008 (aged 85) Brisbane, Queensland, Australia
- Party: Labor
- Spouse: Reeva Clements (m.1943)
- Education: University of Queensland
- Profession: School teacher

Edgar Allan "Ted" Baldwin (25 September 1922 – 1 January 2008) was a member of the Queensland Legislative Assembly.

== Biography ==
Baldwin was born in Moregatta, in the Tablelands Region of Queensland, the son of Allan Baldwin and his wife Ruby May (née Massey). He was educated at Brisbane State High School before graduating from the University of Queensland in 1950 with a Bachelor of Arts and Bachelor of Education.

He began his working life as a 12 year old doing a milk run for two years, and later worked as a sand, gravel and firewood carter for another two years. From 1939, he was a factory worker before attending university. After graduating, Baldwin was a school teacher until 1959.

On 16 June 1943, he married Reeva Clements and they had three sons and a daughter. Baldwin died in January 2008.

== Public career ==
Baldwin, representing the Labor Party, won the seat of Logan at the 1969 Queensland state election, defeating his main opponent, Dick Wood of the Country Party. He represented the electorate for three years, but it was abolished before the 1969 Queensland state election and he moved to the new seat of Redlands, which he held until 1974, when he was defeated by John Goleby of the Country Party.

Referred to as "Red Ted", and "leader of the ratbag radical fringe" when he became president of the Queensland Teachers' Union (QTU) in 1968, Baldwin's work is considered to have laid the foundations for the modern QTU. He was awarded life membership of the union in 1985. In 2001, he was awarded the Commonwealth Centenary Medal for his services to education.

Parliament of Queensland
Preceded by Dick Wood	Member for Logan; 1969–1972	Abolished
New seat	Member for Redlands; 1972–1974	Succeeded by John Goleby
