= Jo Briskey =

Australian politician

Jo Briskey MP
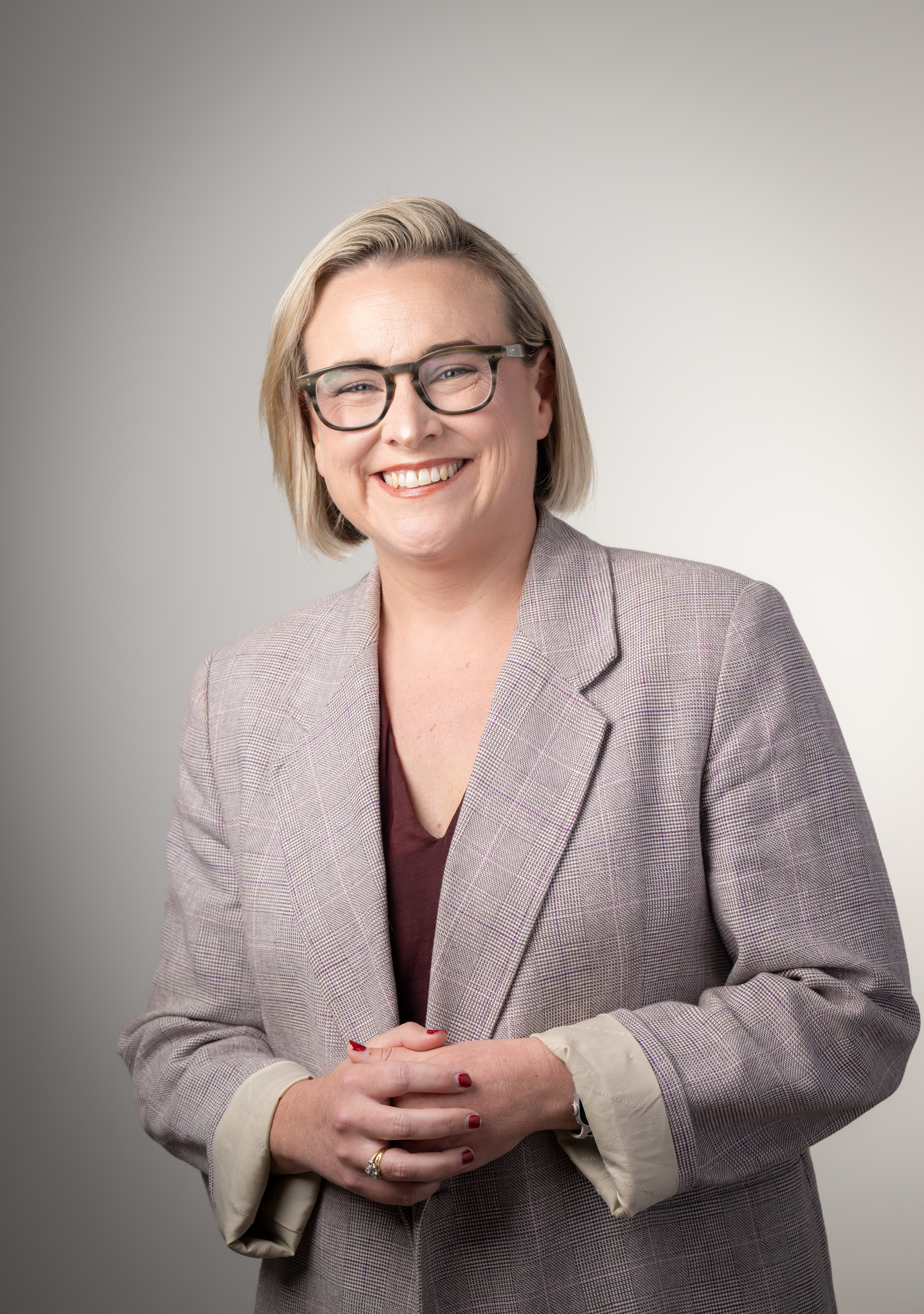
- Briskey in 2025

Member of the Australian Parliament for Maribyrnong
- Incumbent
- Assumed office 3 May 2025
- Preceded by: Bill Shorten

Personal details
- Born: 31 August 1985 (age 41)
- Party: Labor
- Relations: Darryl Briskey (father)
- Education: University of Queensland
- Occupation: Psychologist; Executive; Trade unionist
- Website: jobriskey.com.au

Joanna Leigh Briskey (born 31 August 1985) is an Australian politician. She is a member of the Australian Labor Party (ALP) and has served in the House of Representatives since the 2025 federal election, representing the Victorian seat of Maribyrnong.

== Early life ==
Briskey is the daughter of Darryl Briskey, who was a Queensland state government minister. Her paternal grandfather Bob Briskey was national president of the Australian Postal and Telecommunications Union and a long-serving chair of Credit Union Australia, which originated as the Queensland Postal Cooperative.

Briskey attended All Hallows' School in Brisbane. She holds the degree of Bachelor of Psychology from the University of Queensland and later completed a Master of Educational and Developmental Psychology. She worked as a tutor at Queensland University of Technology, as a research therapist at Institute of Health and Biomedical Innovation, and as a mental health policy adviser to Queensland health minister Geoff Wilson.

Briskey held senior executive roles with The Parenthood, a registered charity and advocacy group associated with the United Workers Union (UWU). In 2019, following her defeat at the 2019 federal election, she moved from Queensland to Victoria to become national coordinator of the UWU.

== Politics ==
=== Early candidacies ===
Briskey ran in the 2012 Queensland state election as Labor's candidate in Cleveland, previously held by her father Darryl Briskey.

In 2018, Briskey won ALP preselection for the federal seat of Bonner. She was defeated by incumbent Liberal MP Ross Vasta as part of a wider swing against the ALP in Queensland.

=== Member for Maribyrnong (2025–present) ===
After moving to Melbourne, Briskey aligned herself with UWU and Labor Left powerbroker Gary Bullock. In 2024 she won ALP preselection for the seat of Maribyrnong, following the retirement of incumbent MP and former party leader Bill Shorten. She was not a resident of the electorate at the time and was accused by her Greens opponent James Williams of being a parachute candidate.

Briskey retained Maribyrnong for the ALP at the 2025 federal election, with a minor swing against Labor on first preferences and the two-party-preferred vote. After the election she joined several parliamentary committees including the House Standing Committee on Regional Development, Infrastructure and Transport, the Joint Standing Committee on Trade and Investment Growth, and the Joint Standing Committee on Treaties.

== See also ==
- Political families of Australia

Parliament of Australia
Preceded by Bill Shorten	Member for Maribyrnong; 2025–present	Incumbent
