= Electoral district of Redlands =

State electoral district of Queensland, Australia

Redlands Queensland—Legislative Assembly
- Electoral map of Redlands 2017
- State: Queensland
- Dates current: 1972–present
- MP: Rebecca Young
- Party: Liberal National Party of Queensland
- Namesake: Redland Bay
- Electors: 37,638 (2020)
- Area: 121 km^{2} (46.7 sq mi)
- Demographic: Outer-metropolitan
- Coordinates: 27°38′S 153°18′E
Electorates around Redlands:
Capalaba; Oodgeroo	Moreton Bay	Oodgeroo
Springwood	Redlands	Oodgeroo
Macalister	Coomera	Broadwater

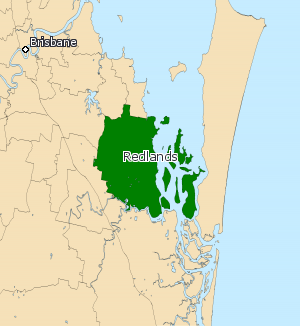
Electoral map of Redlands 2008

Redlands is an electoral district of the Legislative Assembly in the Australian state of Queensland. It primarily covers coastal suburbs on the southside of the city of Brisbane, from Thornlands south to the Logan River.

== Members for Redlands ==
Member	Party	Term
Ted Baldwin	Labor	1972–1974
John Goleby	Country	1974–1974
John Goleby	National	1974–1985
Paul Clauson	National	1985–1989
Darryl Briskey	Labor	1989–1992
John Budd	Labor	1992–1995
John Hegarty	National	1995–2001
John English	Labor	2001–2009
Peter Dowling	Liberal National	2009–2015
Matt McEachan	Liberal National	2015–2017
Kim Richards	Labor	2017–2024
Rebecca Young	Liberal National	2024–present

== Election results ==
2024 Queensland state election: Redlands
Party	Candidate	Votes	%	±%
Liberal National	Rebecca Young	15,537	42.43	+4.33
Labor	Kim Richards	13,848	37.81	−5.69
Greens	Kristie Lockhart	2,495	6.81	−0.39
One Nation	Gary Williamson	2,036	5.56	+1.36
Legalise Cannabis	Suzanne Spierenburg	1,537	4.20	+0.70
Family First	Marita Neville	667	1.82	+1.82
Animal Justice	Liela D'Rose	503	1.37	+1.37
Total formal votes		36,623	95.87	
Informal votes		1,576	4.13	
Turnout		38,199	90.05	
Two-party-preferred result
Liberal National	Rebecca Young	19,005	51.89	+5.79
Labor	Kim Richards	17,618	48.11	−5.79
Liberal National gain from Labor		Swing	+5.79	
