= John Goleby =

Australian politician and farmer

The Honourable John Goleby

Member of the Queensland Legislative Assembly for Redlands
- In office 7 December 1974 – 10 September 1985
- Preceded by: Ted Baldwin
- Succeeded by: Paul Clauson

Personal details
- Born: John Philip Goleby; 22 March 1935 Cleveland, Queensland, Australia
- Died: 10 September 1985 (aged 50) Mount Cotton, Queensland, Australia
- Resting place: Cleveland Cemetery
- Party: National
- Spouse(s): Margery Day (m. 1956; died 1979) Betty Lind (m. 1980)
- Children: 2
- Occupation: Farmer

John Philip Goleby (22 March 1935 – 10 September 1985) was an Australian politician and farmer. A member of the National Party, he served in the Queensland Legislative Assembly for the electoral district of Redlands from 1974 until his death in 1985.

== Early life and career ==
Goleby was born in Cleveland, Queensland, the son of Philip Eric Goleby and his wife Carolena Amelia (née Holzapfel), and lived in the area all his life. He was educated at Mount Cotton and Thornlands state schools before attending Wynnum State High School and, after finishing his education, worked on the family farm at Thornlands. He later bought a property at Mount Cotton and continued his farming career.

Goleby was a councillor on the Redland Shire Council from 1961 until 1980, and during that time was chairman of the Finance and Works Committee from 1967 until 1975, and then chairman of the Works Committee from 1975 to 1978.

In 1974, Goleby successfully stood as the Country Party (National Party) candidate for the seat of Redlands and represented the electorate until his death in 1985. From 6 December 1982 until his death on 10 September 1985, he was the Minister for Water Resources and Maritime Services.

== Personal life and death ==
Goleby married Margery Day on 14 April 1956. The couple had a son and a daughter. Margery died in 1979 and, in December 1980, he married Betty Lind. He was a member of the Uniting Church.

On 10 September 1985, Goleby, aged 50, died in a tractor accident at his Mount Cotton farm. He was accorded a state funeral.

Parliament of Queensland
Preceded by Ted Baldwin	Member for Redlands; 1974–1985	Succeeded by Paul Clauson
