= Peter Dowling =

Australian politician

Member of the Queensland Parliament for Redlands
- In office 21 March 2009 – 31 January 2015
- Preceded by: John English
- Succeeded by: Matt McEachan

Personal details
- Born: 12 August 1961 (age 64) Leicester, England
- Party: Independent 2017–Present Liberal National Party 2009–2017

Peter James Dowling (born 12 August 1961) is an Australian politician. He was a Liberal National Party member of the Legislative Assembly of Queensland from 2009 to 2015, representing the electorate of Redlands.

Dowling was born in Leicester, England. Before entering politics he was a labourer, painter and decorator and sales representative. In 2000, he was elected to Redland City Council representing Division 4, which covers Victoria Point and Coochiemudlo Island; he was deputy mayor 2006–08. In 2009, he was elected to the Legislative Assembly of Queensland as the Liberal National Party member for Redlands, defeating Labor MP John English.

In August 2013, Dowling stood aside as chair of the Parliamentary Ethics Committee after it was revealed he sent explicit text messages and images. After his wife Helen kicked him out, Dowling attempted a political comeback, running for the seat of Redlands as an independent at the 2017 state election, but was unsuccessful.

Parliament of Queensland
Preceded by John English	Member for Redlands; 2009–2015	Succeeded by Matt McEachan
