= Paul Clauson =

Australian politician (1949–2025)

Paul Clauson AM

Member of the Queensland Legislative Assembly for Redlands
- In office 2 November 1985 – 2 December 1989
- Preceded by: John Goleby
- Succeeded by: Darryl Briskey

Personal details
- Born: Paul John Clauson; 16 September 1949 Brisbane, Queensland, Australia
- Died: 12 September 2025 (aged 75)
- Party: National Party
- Spouse: Catherine Anne O'Malley (m.1982)
- Education: University of Queensland
- Occupation: Solicitor

Paul John Clauson (16 September 1949 – 12 September 2025) was an Australian politician.

== Early life and education ==
Clauson was born in Brisbane to Alan George Malcolm Clauson and Ethel Marjory (née Montgomery). He attended Wellington Point Primary School and Brisbane Church of England Grammar School. He studied law at the University of Queensland.

== Legal career ==
Clauson was a solicitor and public servant (1972–1973) and then a judge's associate (1974–1975). From 1975 to 1985 he ran a legal practice; as attorney-general he was called to the Bar in 1987. From 31 October 2014, he was appointed in the role of Legal Services Commissioner Queensland for a three-year term.

== Parliamentary career ==
In 1985, he was elected to the Queensland Legislative Assembly as the National Party member for Redlands in a by-election. He was promoted to the frontbench as Attorney-General of Queensland and Minister for Justice in 1986 where he was responsible for administration of the Queensland Judicial System including justice legislation, prison administration and development and matters associated with the development and promotion of legislative reform, victims rights and corporate regulation.

As Attorney-General of Queensland, he played an important government role in the operation of the Fitzgerald Inquiry into police corruption from 1987 to 1989.

He was Attorney-General and Minister for Heritage and the Arts from 25 September 1989 to 7 December 1989, Minister for Justice and Attorney-General and Minister for Corrective Services from 19 January 1989 to 29 August 1989, Minister for Justice and Attorney-General from 9 December 1987 to 19 January 1989 and Attorney-General and Minister for Justice from 18 November 1986 to 1 December 1987.

Clauson lost his seat in 1989; he ran again unsuccessfully in 1992.

== Post-parliamentary career ==
Clauson worked as a consultant following the end of his parliamentary career and was a committee member and executive director of the Infrastructure Association of Queensland for over 15 years and an adjunct professor at Bond University.

He was a member of the board of directors for Ormiston College from March 1991 to September 2014.

Clauson was made a Member of the Order of Australia in the 2019 Queen's Birthday Honours, for significant service to the law and to the people and Parliament of Queensland.

== Personal life ==
Clauson's interests included yachting, gardening, fishing, reading, politics, history, cricket and local community groups. He was a member of the Royal Queensland Yacht Squadron, United Service (Queensland), Redlands Cricketers Club and Redlands Bowling Club.

Clauson died on 12 January 2026 at the age of 76.

Parliament of Queensland
Preceded by John Goleby	Member for Redlands; 1985–1989	Succeeded by Darryl Briskey
