= Matt McEachan =

Australian politician

Member of the Queensland Legislative Assembly for Redlands
- In office 31 January 2015 – 25 November 2017
- Preceded by: Peter Dowling
- Succeeded by: Kim Richards

Personal details
- Born: 2 July 1970 (age 56) Whyalla, South Australia
- Party: Liberal National Party
- Education: Griffith University

Matthew John McEachan (born 2 July 1970) is a former Australian politician, political strategist and campaigner. He was the Liberal National Party member for Redlands in the Queensland Legislative Assembly from 2015 to 2017. He was made Shadow Assistant Minister to the Leader of the Opposition in 2016, and served on the parliamentary Ethics, Health, Transport and Utilities committees.

Parliament of Queensland
Preceded by Peter Dowling	Member for Redlands; 2015–2017	Succeeded by Kim Richards
