= Darryl Briskey =

Australian politician (born 1955)

Member of the Queensland Legislative Assembly for Redlands
- In office 2 December 1989 – 19 September 1992
- Preceded by: Paul Clauson
- Succeeded by: John Budd

Member of the Queensland Legislative Assembly for Cleveland
- In office 19 September 1992 – 9 September 2006
- Preceded by: New seat
- Succeeded by: Phil Weightman

Personal details
- Born: Darryl James Briskey; 24 August 1955 (age 70) Roma, Queensland, Australia
- Party: Labor
- Spouse: Catherine Leigh Briskey
- Children: Jo Briskey; Kathleen Briskey; Alison Briskey; William Briskey
- Occupation: School teacher

Darryl James Briskey (born 24 August 1955) is a former Australian politician. Born in Roma, Queensland, he was a teacher before entering politics. In 1978, he joined the Cleveland branch of the Labor Party. In 1989, he was elected to the Legislative Assembly of Queensland as the Labor member for Redlands, transferring to Cleveland in 1992. He continued to represent the seat until his retirement in 2006.

Briskey unsuccessfully contested the 2013 federal election for the Australian Labor Party in the electorate of Bowman, against the Liberal National Party incumbent, Andrew Laming.

His daughter Jo Briskey was elected MP for Maribyrnong in the 2025 Australian federal election.

== See also ==
- Political families of Australia

Parliament of Queensland
Preceded by Paul Clauson	Member for Redlands; 1989–1992	Succeeded by John Budd
New seat	Member for Cleveland; 1992–2006	Succeeded by Phil Weightman
