= Electoral district of Cleveland =

State electoral district of Queensland, Australia

Cleveland Queensland—Legislative Assembly
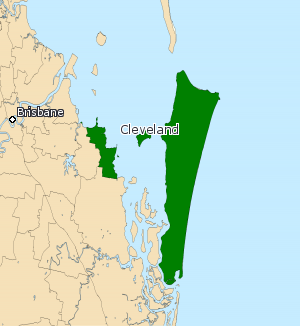
- Cleveland (2008–2017)
- State: Queensland
- Dates current: 1992–2017
- MP: Several
- Party: Labor (twice); Liberal National (once)
- Namesake: Cleveland
- Electors: 34,947 (2015)
- Area: 313 km^{2} (120.8 sq mi)
- Coordinates: 27°34′S 153°23′E

Cleveland was an electoral district of the Legislative Assembly in the Australian state of Queensland from 1992 to 2017.

Based in the northern part of Redland City Council, the district included the suburbs of Wellington Point, Ormiston, Cleveland and Thornlands. It also covers the entirety of North Stradbroke Island.

In the 2017 electoral redistribution, the Electoral Commission of Queensland changed the name of the electorate to Oodgeroo.

== Members for Cleveland ==
Member	Party	Term
Darryl Briskey	Labor	1992–2006
Phil Weightman	Labor	2006–2009
Mark Robinson	Liberal National	2009–2017
