= Mark Robinson (Australian politician) =

Australian politician (born 1963)

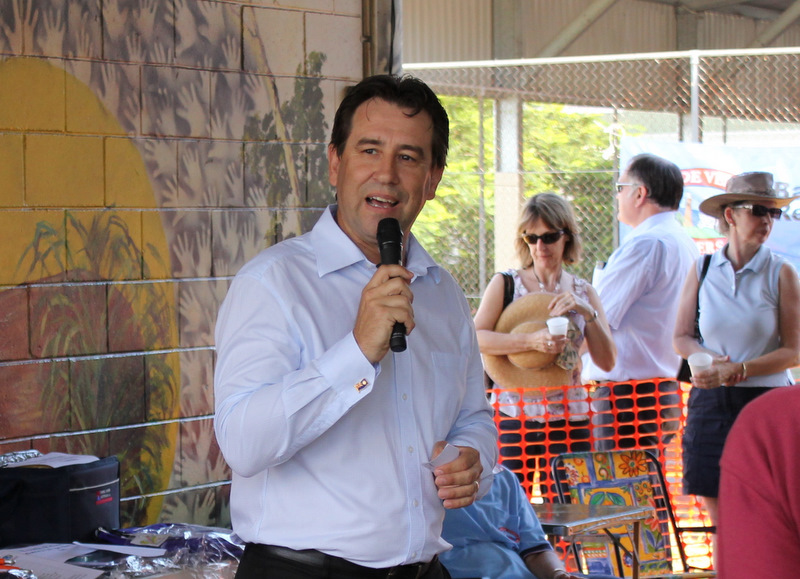

Deputy Speaker of the Queensland Legislative Assembly
- In office 17 May 2012 – 24 March 2015
- Preceded by: Jason O'Brien
- Succeeded by: Grace Grace

Member of the Queensland Parliament for Oodgeroo (2017–2024) Cleveland (2009–2017)
- In office 21 March 2009 – 26 October 2024
- Preceded by: Phil Weightman
- Succeeded by: Amanda Stoker

Personal details
- Born: 29 April 1963 (age 63) Traralgon, Australia
- Party: Liberal National Party
- Spouse: Julie Robinson
- Children: 7

Mark Andrew Robinson (born 29 April 1963) is an Australian politician who is a former Deputy Speaker of the Queensland Legislative Assembly. From 2017 to 2024, he held the seat of Oodgeroo in the Legislative Assembly for the Liberal National Party (LNP), having previously represented the seat of Cleveland from 2009-2017.

== Early life and education ==
Robinson was born in Traralgon, Victoria. He has a PhD from the University of Queensland, a Master of Arts in International Studies from Griffith University, and a Bachelor of Science majoring in marine biology and zoology from James Cook University. He was a lecturer, teacher and charity manager before entering politics.

== Member of Parliament ==
In 2009, he was elected to the Legislative Assembly of Queensland as the Liberal National Party member for Cleveland.

He was appointed the Shadow Parliamentary Secretary for Apprenticeships and Trade Training in November 2010. Following the election of Campbell Newman as LNP Leader, Robinson was given the position of Shadow Minister for Main Roads, Fisheries and Marine Infrastructure. Two weeks after the LNP formed government following its win in the 2012 state election, Robinson was elevated to the role of Deputy Speaker and Chairman of Committees of the Queensland Parliament, and was formally elected to the position on 17 May 2012. At the 2017 redistribution the state seat was renamed Oodgeroo. He now serves as a member of the Parliamentary Crime and Corruption Committee (PCCC) in the Parliament.

He stood for the LNP leadership after the 2017 election finishing third behind Deb Frecklington and John-Paul Langbroek.

Robinson announced his intention to retire from politics at the 2024 state election on 16 June 2023.

== Personal life ==
Mark is married to Julie Robinson and lives in Redland City; they have 7 children together.

== Policies and views ==
The Guardian has referred to Robinson as "ultra-conservative". Labor MP Jackie Trad once referred to him as an "extremist".

Abortion

Robinson has been an outspoken critic of abortion, and has stated he believes life is sacred. He said he once believed that abortion was a personal and medical choice, but his views have since changed. As an MP, he attended multiple anti-abortion rallies including one in Melbourne, Victoria, with his wife, for which he charged taxpayers his travel expenses.

He opposed a 2018 law to decriminalise abortion in Queensland (previously, Queensland was the last remaining jurisdiction in Australia where performing an abortion was a crime) and allow abortion on request up to 22 weeks, as well as introduce safe access zones of 150 metres around clinics. He referred to the Australian Labor Party as "the abortion party" and Jackie Trad (then-Deputy Premier) as "Jihad Jackie", suggesting she was "on a jihad to force extreme abortion laws on QLDers".

Religion and ethnicity

The Brisbane Times described Robinson as a conservative Christian while LNP MP Shane Knuth described him as a born-again Christian. In 2015 Robinson accused Australian politicians of "muspandering" (pandering to Muslims) and US politicians of "hispandering" (pandering to Hispanic Americans).

Family values, LGBT people and education

In a press release on 12 May 2020, Robinson stated that parents are "sick" of "Labor's politically correct extremist social engineering" through "compulsory gender fluid programs in schools" and he is proud the LNP pledged to scrap "transgender studies" and "get the curriculum back to basics".

He has expressed support for "mainstream values" and "traditional family values".

During the debate about legalising same-sex marriage in Australia in 2017, Mark Robinson's wife, Julie Robinson, posted an anti-SSM sign on Labor MP Don Brown's office window. Brown asked for an apology. Mark defended his wife, and accused Don of having a "fragile ego". Julie eventually apologised.

Parliament of Queensland
Preceded by Phil Weightman	Member for Cleveland; 2009–2017	Abolished
New seat	Member for Oodgeroo; 2017–present	Incumbent
Preceded by Jason O'Brien	Deputy Speaker of the Queensland Legislative Assembly; 2012–2015	Succeeded by Grace Grace
