= Electoral results for the district of Mount Coot-tha =

Queensland, Australia, district election results

This is a list of electoral results for the electoral district of Mount Coot-tha in Queensland state elections.

== Members for Mount Coot-tha ==
Member	Party	Term
Sir Kenneth Morris	Liberal	1950–1963
Bill Lickiss	Liberal	1963–1986
Lyle Schuntner	Liberal	1986–1989
Wendy Edmond	Labor	1989–2004
Andrew Fraser	Labor	2004–2012
Saxon Rice	Liberal National	2012–2015
Steven Miles	Labor	2015–2017

== Election results ==
=== Elections in the 2010s ===
2015 Queensland state election: Mount Coot-tha
Party	Candidate	Votes	%	±%
Liberal National	Saxon Rice	11,814	42.98	−4.76
Labor	Steven Miles	8,966	32.62	+3.98
Greens	Omar Ameer	6,095	22.17	+1.46
Independent	Charles Mcalister	611	2.22	+2.22
Total formal votes		27,486	98.75	−0.02
Informal votes		349	1.25	+0.02
Turnout		27,835	87.64	−1.89
Two-party-preferred result
Labor	Steven Miles	13,920	52.59	+7.95
Liberal National	Saxon Rice	12,550	47.41	−7.95
Labor gain from Liberal National		Swing	+7.95	

2012 Queensland state election: Mount Coot-tha
Party	Candidate	Votes	%	±%
Liberal National	Saxon Rice	12,142	47.74	+11.48
Labor	Andrew Fraser	7,285	28.64	−9.24
Greens	Adam Stone	5,269	20.72	−2.36
Katter's Australian	Margaret Waterman	739	2.91	+2.91
Total formal votes		25,435	98.77	−0.01
Informal votes		317	1.23	+0.01
Turnout		25,435	89.53	+1.76
Two-party-preferred result
Liberal National	Saxon Rice	13,067	55.36	+10.61
Labor	Andrew Fraser	10,538	44.64	−10.61
Liberal National gain from Labor		Swing	+10.61	

=== Elections in the 2000s ===
2009 Queensland state election: Mount Coot-tha
Party	Candidate	Votes	%	±%
Labor	Andrew Fraser	9,544	37.9	−6.9
Liberal National	John Pollard	9,135	36.3	+3.1
Greens	Larissa Waters	5,815	23.1	+1.2
DS4SEQ	Suzanne Karamujic	335	1.3	+1.3
Independent	Dave Zwolenski	202	0.8	+0.8
Independent	James Sinnamon	163	0.6	+0.6
Total formal votes		25,194	98.7	
Informal votes		312	1.3	
Turnout		25,506	87.8	
Two-party-preferred result
Labor	Andrew Fraser	12,493	55.2	−5.1
Liberal National	John Pollard	10,120	44.8	+5.1
Labor hold		Swing	−5.1	

2006 Queensland state election: Mount Coot-tha
Party	Candidate	Votes	%	±%
Labor	Andrew Fraser	10,691	45.0	+0.8
Liberal	James Mackay	7,903	33.3	+3.2
Greens	Juanita Wheeler	5,163	21.7	−1.9
Total formal votes		23,757	98.6	−0.1
Informal votes		345	1.4	+0.1
Turnout		24,102	86.5	+0.0
Two-party-preferred result
Labor	Andrew Fraser	13,313	60.5	−1.0
Liberal	James Mackay	8,709	39.5	+1.0
Labor hold		Swing	−1.0	

2004 Queensland state election: Mount Coot-tha
Party	Candidate	Votes	%	±%
Labor	Andrew Fraser	10,457	44.2	−6.8
Liberal	Ray Sargent	7,112	30.1	+3.5
Greens	Andrew Carroll	5,568	23.6	+11.7
Independent	Dave Noke	505	2.1	+2.1
Total formal votes		23,642	98.7	+0.2
Informal votes		319	1.3	−0.2
Turnout		23,961	86.5	−2.2
Two-party-preferred result
Labor	Andrew Fraser	13,170	61.5	−4.6
Liberal	Ray Sargent	8,229	38.5	+4.6
Labor hold		Swing	−4.6	

2001 Queensland state election: Mount Coot-tha
Party	Candidate	Votes	%	±%
Labor	Wendy Edmond	11,741	51.0	+1.4
Liberal	Jenny Cannon	6,135	26.6	−7.7
Greens	Dick Copeman	2,740	11.9	+2.0
Independent	Anne Boccabella	1,424	6.2	+6.2
Democrats	Adam Zaborszczyk	985	4.3	−1.3
Total formal votes		23,025	98.5	
Informal votes		348	1.5	
Turnout		23,373	88.7	
Two-party-preferred result
Labor	Wendy Edmond	13,888	66.1	+5.1
Liberal	Jenny Cannon	7,116	33.9	−5.1
Labor hold		Swing	+5.1	

=== Elections in the 1990s ===
1998 Queensland state election: Mount Coot-tha
Party	Candidate	Votes	%	±%
Labor	Wendy Edmond	10,198	49.1	+10.3
Liberal	Rolene Orford	7,273	35.0	−2.0
Greens	Dick Copeman	2,107	10.1	−14.1
Democrats	Alison Jensen	1,199	5.8	+5.8
Total formal votes		20,777	98.6	−0.1
Informal votes		294	1.4	+0.1
Turnout		21,071	90.2	+2.1
Two-party-preferred result
Labor	Wendy Edmond	12,245	60.5	+7.0
Liberal	Rolene Orford	7,992	39.5	−7.0
Labor hold		Swing	+7.0	

1995 Queensland state election: Mount Coot-tha
Party	Candidate	Votes	%	±%
Labor	Wendy Edmond	7,571	38.8	−17.2
Liberal	Rolene Orford	7,228	37.0	+11.4
Greens	Drew Hutton	4,724	24.2	+24.2
Total formal votes		19,523	98.7	+0.5
Informal votes		261	1.3	−0.5
Turnout		19,784	88.1	
Two-party-preferred result
Labor	Wendy Edmond	9,883	53.5	−8.9
Liberal	Rolene Orford	8,597	46.5	+8.9
Labor hold		Swing	−8.9	

1992 Queensland state election: Mount Coot-tha
Party	Candidate	Votes	%	±%
Labor	Wendy Edmond	11,646	56.0	−0.7
Liberal	Andrew McBryde	5,321	25.6	−5.1
National	Don Caslick	2,243	10.8	+2.2
Democrats	Kerri Kellett	1,587	7.6	+7.6
Total formal votes		20,797	98.2	
Informal votes		389	1.8	
Turnout		21,186	88.8	
Two-party-preferred result
Labor	Wendy Edmond	12,546	62.4	+2.7
Liberal	Andrew McBryde	7,567	37.6	−2.7
Labor hold		Swing	+2.7	

=== Elections in the 1980s ===
1989 Queensland state election: Mount Coot-tha
Party	Candidate	Votes	%	±%
Labor	Wendy Edmond	9,461	54.8	+15.7
Liberal	Lyle Schuntner	5,860	34.0	+4.0
National	Geoffrey Colless	1,454	8.4	−18.2
Greens	Myron Loving	481	2.8	+2.8
Total formal votes		17,256	98.1	0.0
Informal votes		328	1.9	0.0
Turnout		17,584	90.8	−0.8
Two-party-preferred result
Labor	Wendy Edmond	9,836	57.0	+13.2
Liberal	Lyle Schuntner	7,420	43.0	−13.2
Labor gain from Liberal		Swing	+13.2	

1986 Queensland state election: Mount Coot-tha
Party	Candidate	Votes	%	±%
Labor	John Moran	6,406	39.1	+16.0
Liberal	Lyle Schuntner	4,917	30.0	+3.1
National	Geoff Colless	4,353	26.6	−6.3
Democrats	John Elfick	691	4.2	−12.9
Total formal votes		16,367	98.1	−1.2
Informal votes		309	1.9	+1.2
Turnout		16,676	91.6	−1.2
Two-party-preferred result
Liberal	Lyle Schuntner	9,199	56.2	+1.0
Labor	John Moran	7,168	43.8	−1.0
Liberal hold		Swing	+1.0	

1983 Queensland state election: Mount Coot-tha
Party	Candidate	Votes	%	±%
National	Cedric Dowdle	5,805	32.8	+32.8
Liberal	Bill Lickiss	4,751	26.9	−35.9
Labor	Denis Pacey	4,086	23.1	+6.6
Democrats	David Dalgarno	3,029	17.1	−3.7
Total formal votes		17,671	99.3	+0.5
Informal votes		129	0.7	−0.5
Turnout		17,800	92.8	+3.7
Two-candidate-preferred result
Liberal	Bill Lickiss	10,700	60.5	−12.4
National	Cedric Dowdle	6,971	39.5	+39.5
Liberal hold		Swing	N/A	

1980 Queensland state election: Mount Coot-tha
Party	Candidate	Votes	%	±%
Liberal	Bill Lickiss	9,487	62.8	+0.3
Democrats	David Dalgarno	3,137	20.8	+20.8
Labor	Graham Kevin	2,489	16.5	−10.5
Total formal votes		15,114	98.8	−0.4
Informal votes		189	1.2	+0.4
Turnout		15,303	89.1	−2.8
Two-party-preferred result
Liberal	Bill Lickiss	11,024	72.9	+3.1
Labor	Graham Kevin	4,089	27.1	−3.1
Liberal hold		Swing	+3.1	

- The two-party-preferred vote was not counted between the Liberal and Democrat candidates for Mount Coot-tha.

=== Elections in the 1970s ===
1977 Queensland state election: Mount Coot-tha
Party	Candidate	Votes	%	±%
Liberal	Bill Lickiss	8,604	62.5	−12.6
Labor	Jon Stanford	3,719	27.0	+4.3
Progress	W.J. Younger	1,437	10.4	+10.4
Total formal votes		13,760	99.2	
Informal votes		115	0.8	
Turnout		13,875	91.9	
Two-party-preferred result
Liberal	Bill Lickiss	9,610	69.8	−8.6
Labor	Jon Stanford	4,150	30.2	+8.6
Liberal hold		Swing	−8.6	

1974 Queensland state election: Mount Coot-tha
Party	Candidate	Votes	%	±%
Liberal	Bill Lickiss	11,560	75.1	+18.5
Labor	Ian De Lacy	3,495	22.7	−9.4
Queensland Labor	Ross Domrow	331	2.2	−9.1
Total formal votes		15,386	98.7	0.0
Informal votes		206	1.3	0.0
Turnout		15,592	89.9	−1.3
Two-party-preferred result
Liberal	Bill Lickiss	11,835	76.9	+10.9
Labor	Ian De Lacy	3,551	23.1	−10.9
Liberal hold		Swing	+10.9	

1972 Queensland state election: Mount Coot-tha
Party	Candidate	Votes	%	±%
Liberal	Bill Lickiss	6,880	56.6	−2.0
Labor	Ian De Lacy	3,893	32.1	+2.5
Queensland Labor	Cecilia Edwards	1,371	11.3	−0.4
Total formal votes		12,144	98.7	
Informal votes		163	1.3	
Turnout		12,307	91.2	
Two-party-preferred result
Liberal	Bill Lickiss	8,019	66.0	−3.2
Labor	Ian De Lacy	4,125	34.0	+3.2
Liberal hold		Swing	−3.2	

=== Elections in the 1960s ===
1969 Queensland state election: Mount Coot-tha
Party	Candidate	Votes	%	±%
Liberal	Bill Lickiss	9,854	58.6	−1.4
Labor	Con Sciacca	4,976	29.6	−1.8
Queensland Labor	Andrew Aitken	1,972	11.7	+3.1
Total formal votes		16,802	98.5	−0.2
Informal votes		259	1.5	+0.2
Turnout		17,061	91.8	−1.9
Two-party-preferred result
Liberal	Bill Lickiss	11,514	68.5	+1.5
Labor	Con Sciacca	5,288	31.5	−1.5
Liberal hold		Swing	+1.5	

1966 Queensland state election: Mount Coot-tha
Party	Candidate	Votes	%	±%
Liberal	Bill Lickiss	8,522	60.0	+0.3
Labor	Barry Gorman	4,463	31.4	−1.1
Queensland Labor	Maxwell Muller	1,227	8.6	+0.8
Total formal votes		14,212	98.7	+0.7
Informal votes		188	1.3	−0.7
Turnout		14,400	93.7	−1.6
Two-party-preferred result
Liberal	Bill Lickiss	9,520	67.0	+1.0
Labor	Barry Gorman	4,692	33.0	−1.0
Liberal hold		Swing	+1.0	

1963 Queensland state election: Mount Coot-tha
Party	Candidate	Votes	%	±%
Liberal	Bill Lickiss	7,175	59.7	+2.9
Labor	Norm Maddock	3,908	32.5	+2.6
Queensland Labor	Max Muller	941	7.8	−5.5
Total formal votes		12,024	98.0	−0.3
Informal votes		248	2.0	+0.3
Turnout		12,272	95.3	+2.3
Two-party-preferred result
Liberal	Bill Lickiss	7,941	66.0	
Labor	Norm Maddock	4,083	34.0	
Liberal hold		Swing	N/A	

1960 Queensland state election: Mount Coot-tha
Party	Candidate	Votes	%	±%
Liberal	Kenneth Morris	5,803	56.8	
Labor	James Davis	3,057	29.9	
Queensland Labor	Bryan Hurley	1,362	13.3	
Total formal votes		10,222	98.3	
Informal votes		181	1.7	
Turnout		10,403	93.0	
Liberal hold		Swing		

=== Elections in the 1950s ===
1957 Queensland state election: Mount Coot-tha
Party	Candidate	Votes	%	±%
Liberal	Kenneth Morris	8,723	58.4	−4.0
Labor	Desmond Raven	3,254	21.8	−15.8
Queensland Labor	John Lynch	2,967	19.8	+19.8
Total formal votes		14,944	99.0	+0.2
Informal votes		148	1.0	−0.2
Turnout		15,092	94.9	+0.8
Liberal hold		Swing	+10.4	

1956 Queensland state election: Mount Coot-tha
Party	Candidate	Votes	%	±%
Liberal	Kenneth Morris	8,932	62.4	+4.5
Labor	Vlad Darveniza	5,386	37.6	−4.5
Total formal votes		14,318	98.8	0.0
Informal votes		171	1.2	0.0
Turnout		14,489	94.1	−0.1
Liberal hold		Swing	+4.5	

1953 Queensland state election: Mount Coot-tha
Party	Candidate	Votes	%	±%
Liberal	Kenneth Morris	7,484	57.3	−2.8
Labor	Vlad Darveniza	5,578	42.7	+2.8
Total formal votes		13,062	98.8	−0.2
Informal votes		163	1.2	+0.2
Turnout		13,225	94.2	+0.4
Liberal hold		Swing	−2.8	

1950 Queensland state election: Mount Coot-tha
Party	Candidate	Votes	%	±%
Liberal	Kenneth Morris	7,032	60.1	
Labor	Bryan Hurley	4,668	39.9	
Total formal votes		11,700	99.0	
Informal votes		117	1.0	
Turnout		11,817	93.8	
Liberal hold		Swing		
