= Beattie ministry =

Government of Queensland under Beattie

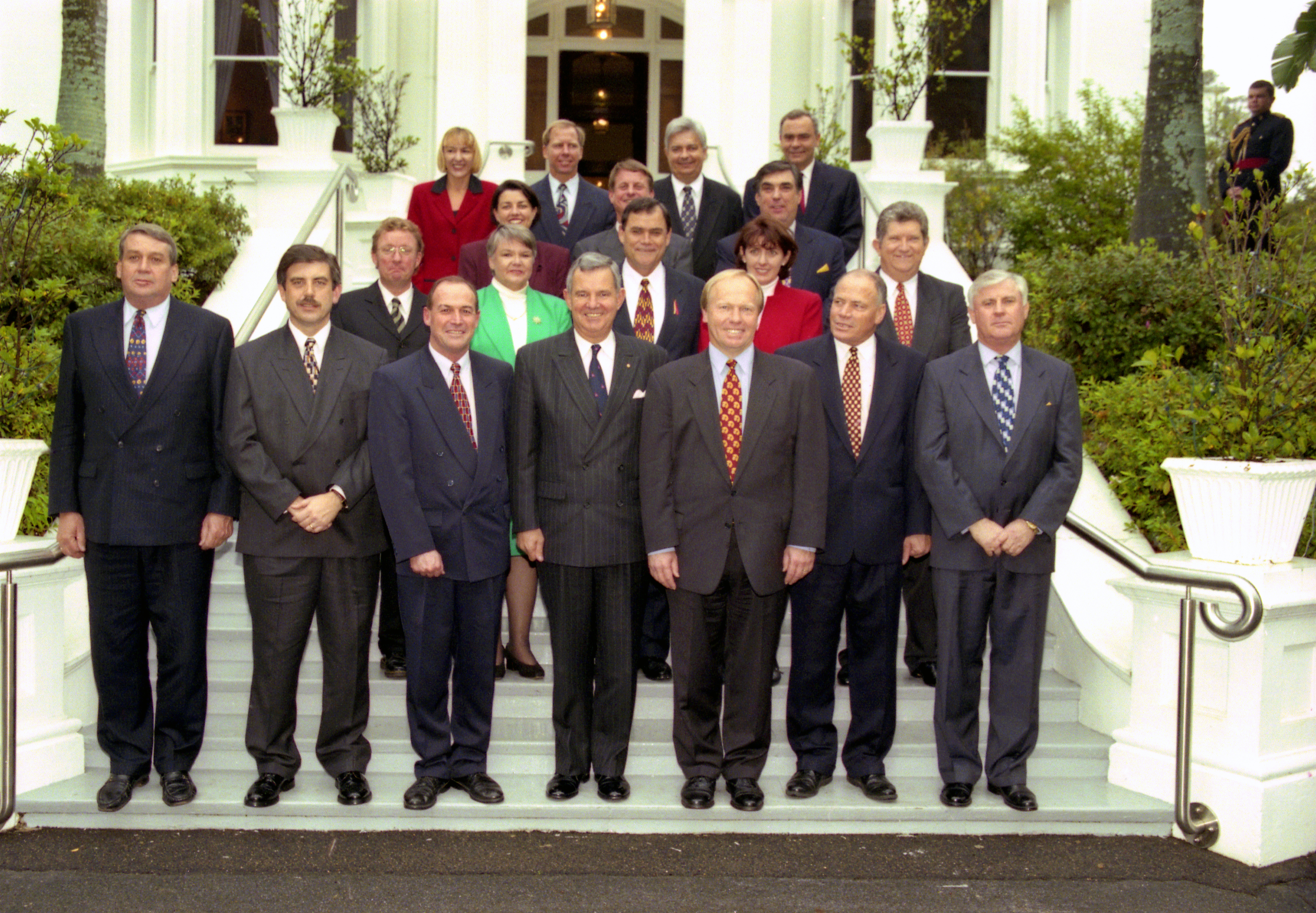
The First Beattie Ministry, 1998

The Beattie Ministry was a Ministry of the Government of Queensland, led by Labor Premier Peter Beattie. It commenced on 26 June 1998, thirteen days after the Borbidge Ministry, led by Premier Rob Borbidge of the National Party, was defeated at the 1998 election. It was followed by the Bligh Ministry upon Beattie's retirement as Premier on 13 September 2007.

== Overview ==
The election produced an unusual result—Labor did not gain any net seats in the Legislative Assembly of Queensland, maintaining 44 of 89, or one short of a governing majority, but the National-Liberal coalition which had governed with the support of Independent Liz Cunningham was reduced from 44 to 32 due mainly to the rise of Pauline Hanson's One Nation Party in their rural heartland. After negotiations between the Labor Party, Cunningham and a new independent, Peter Wellington, the latter announced on 25 June 1998 that he would support a minority Labor government on votes of confidence in return for specific commitments on accountability. The following day, Labor leader Peter Beattie and his deputy, Jim Elder, were sworn in by the Governor of Queensland as a two-man cabinet. Three days later, on 29 June 1998, they resigned so that a full ministry chosen by Caucus could be sworn in.

== First Ministry ==
On 29 June 1998, a full ministry of 18 cabinet ministers and 4 parliamentary secretaries was sworn in. It served until the reconstitution of the Ministry on 22 February 2001 following the 2001 election.

The list below is ordered by decreasing seniority within the Cabinet, as indicated by the Government Gazette and the Hansard index.

Office	Minister
Premier Minister for State Development and Trade (26–30 November 2000)	Peter Beattie, BA, LL.B., MA, MP
Deputy Premier; Minister for State Development and Trade	Jim Elder, MP (until 22 November 2000)
Leader of the House Minister for Communication and Information; Minister for Local Government and Planning (until 30 November 2000); Minister for Rural Communities (until 16 December 1999); Minister for Sport (from 16 December 1999)^{[2]} Deputy Premier (from 30 November 2000); Minister for State Development and Trade (from 30 November 2000)	Terry Mackenroth, MP
Minister for Tourism Minister for Sport and Racing	Bob Gibbs, MP (until 14 December 1999)^{[2]}
Treasurer	David Hamill, BA(Hons), MA(Oxon), FCIT, FAICD, MP^{[1]}
Minister for Employment and Training Minister for Industrial Relations	Paul Braddy, LL.B., MP
Deputy Premier Minister for State Development and Trade (22–26 November 2000)	Paul Braddy, LL.B., MP
Attorney-General Minister for Justice; Minister for the Arts	Matt Foley, BA, BSW, LL.B.(Hons), MP
Minister for Health	Wendy Edmond, DipRadiog, DipNuclMed, MP
Minister for Police and Corrective Services	Tom Barton, MP
Minister for Mines and Energy Minister assisting the Deputy Premier on Regional Development	Tony McGrady, MP
Minister for Transport Minister for Main Roads	Steve Bredhauer, DipTeach, MP
Minister for Education	Dean Wells, BA(Hons), MA, LL.B., MP
Minister for Public Works Minister for Housing	Robert Schwarten, BEd, DipTeach, MP
Minister for Families Minister for Youth and Community Care; Minister for Disability Services	Anna Bligh, BA, MP
Minister for Aboriginal and Torres Strait Policy Minister for Women's Policy; Minister for Fair Trading	Judy Spence, BA, DipTeach, MP
Minister for Environment and Heritage Minister for Natural Resources	Rod Welford, BA(Hons), LL.B., GradDipLegPrac, MSc(Env), MP
Minister for Primary Industries Minister for Rural Communities (from 16 December 1999)	Henry Palaszczuk, DipTeach, MP
Minister for Emergency Services (until 16 December 1999) Minister for Tourism and Racing (from 16 December 1999)	Merri Rose, MP^{2}
Minister for Emergency Services	Stephen Robertson, BA(Hons), MP (from 16 December 1999)^{2}
Minister for Local Government and Planning	Nita Cunningham, MP (from 30 November 2000)
Parliamentary Secretaries	Stephen Robertson (until 16 December 1999)^{2} Gordon Nuttall; Mike Reynolds; Darryl Briskey; Dr Lesley Clark (from 16 December 1999)
Whips
Government Whip	Terry Sullivan
Deputy Government Whip	Pat Purcell
Deputy Government Whip	Phil Reeves (from 22 March 2000)

Notes:

^{1} On 1 August 1999, David Hamill was required to stand aside as Treasurer while investigations by the Auditor-General and the Criminal Justice Commission into the awarding of an Internet gaming licence was in process. Premier Peter Beattie served as Acting Treasurer and brought down a budget on 14 September. On 30 September, both inquiries cleared Hamill of any wrongdoing and he was reinstated.
^{2} On 14 December 1999, Bob Gibbs resigned from Parliament to accept a role as trade commissioner to Los Angeles. Terry Mackenroth assumed his Sport portfolio (losing Rural Communities to Henry Palaszczuk), with Tourism and Racing going to junior minister Merri Rose. Parliamentary secretary to the Deputy Premier, Stephen Robertson, was appointed as a minister and took on Rose's former role of Emergency Services.
^{3} On 22 November 1999, Deputy Premier Jim Elder, who was Acting Premier at the time due to the Premier being overseas, resigned following allegations that he was under suspicion for having illegally signed electoral forms for family members in his own seat. His portfolios were assumed for four days by Paul Braddy, then for another four by Premier Peter Beattie, before a minor reshuffle on 30 November 2000 which saw, among other things, Terry Mackenroth's promotion to Deputy Premier and Nita Cunningham's appointment to the Ministry.

== Second Ministry ==
On 22 February 2001, following the 2001 election, a ministry of 19 cabinet ministers and 5 parliamentary secretaries was sworn in. It served until the reconstitution of the Ministry on 12 February 2004 following the 2004 election.

Office	Minister
Premier; Minister for Trade	Peter Beattie, BA, LL.B., MA, MP
Deputy Premier; Treasurer; Minister for Sport	Terry Mackenroth, MP
Leader of the House Minister for Education	Anna Bligh, BA, MP
Minister for Employment and Training; Minister for Youth Minister for the Arts	Matt Foley, BA, BSW, LL.B.(Hons), MP
Minister for Health Minister assisting the Premier on Women's Policy	Wendy Edmond, DipRadiog, DipNuclMed, MP
Minister for State Development	Tom Barton, MP
Minister for Police and Corrective Services Minister assisting the Premier on the Carpentaria	Tony McGrady, MP
Minister for Transport Minister for Main Roads	Steve Bredhauer, DipTeach, MP
Attorney-General Minister for Justice	Rod Welford, BA(Hons), LL.B., GradDipLegPrac, MSc(Env), MP
Minister for Environment	Dean Wells, BA(Hons), MA, LL.B., MP
Minister for Public Works Minister for Housing	Robert Schwarten, BEd, DipTeach, MP
Minister for Families Minister for Aboriginal and Torres Strait Islander Policy; Minister for Disability Services; Minister for Seniors (from 20 June 2002)	Judy Spence, BA, DipTeach, MP
Minister for Primary Industries Minister for Rural Communities	Henry Palaszczuk, DipTeach, MP
Minister for Tourism and Racing Minister for Fair Trading	Merri Rose, MP (until 15 January 2004)
Minister for Natural Resources; Minister for Mines	Stephen Robertson, BA(Hons), MP
Minister for Local Government and Planning	Nita Cunningham, MP
Minister for Emergency Services; Minister assisting the Premier in North Queensland	Mike Reynolds, AM, BSW, MA, MP
Minister for Industrial Relations	Gordon Nuttall, MP
Minister for Innovation and Information Economy; Minister for Energy (from 20 December 2002)	Paul Lucas, BEcon, LL.B., MBA, MP
Parliamentary Secretaries	Darryl Briskey; Dr Lesley Clark; Neil Roberts; Jo-Ann Miller; Lindy Nelson-Carr
Whips
Government Whip	Terry Sullivan
Deputy Government Whip	Pat Purcell
Deputy Government Whip	Phil Reeves

== Third Ministry ==
On 12 February 2004, following the 2004 election, a ministry of 19 cabinet ministers and 6 parliamentary secretaries was sworn in. It served until the reconstitution of the Ministry on 28 July 2005 following the resignation of Deputy Premier Terry Mackenroth.

On 3 March 2005, Liddy Clark resigned after an investigation to the Crime and Misconduct Commission into airfares given to Aboriginal activists to Palm Island following a riot there. Her position in the ministry was not filled, with her portfolio going to John Mickel.

Office	Minister
Premier; Minister for Trade	Peter Beattie, BA, LL.B., MA, MP
Deputy Premier; Treasurer; Minister for Sport	Terry Mackenroth, MP (until 25 July 2005)
Leader of the House; Minister for Education; Minister for the Arts	Anna Bligh, BA, MP
Minister for Employment and Training; Minister for Industrial Relations	Tom Barton, MP
Minister for State Development and Innovation	Tony McGrady, MP
Minister for Health	Gordon Nuttall, MP
Minister for Public Works; Minister for Housing; Minister for Racing	Robert Schwarten, BEd, DipTeach, MP
Minister for Police and Corrective Services	Judy Spence, BA, DipTeach, MP
Attorney-General; Minister for Justice	Rod Welford, BA(Hons), LL.B., GradDipLegPrac, MSc(Env), MP
Minister for Transport; Minister for Main Roads	Paul Lucas, BEcon, LL.B., MBA, MP
Minister for Primary Industries and Fisheries	Henry Palaszczuk, DipTeach, MP
Minister for Natural Resources; Minister for Mines and Energy (until 25 August 2004); Minister for Mines (from 25 August 2004)	Stephen Robertson, BA(Hons), MP
Minister for Child Safety	Mike Reynolds, AM, BSW, MA, MP
Minister for Communities; Minister for Disability Services; Minister for Seniors (from 22 April 2004)	Warren Pitt, BEdSt, BA, DipTeach, MP
Minister for Tourism; Minister for Fair Trading; Minister for Wine Industry Development	Margaret Keech, B.Econ, GradDipAppLing, MA, MP
Minister for Environment (until 25 August 2004); Minister for Energy (from 25 August 2004); Minister for Aboriginal and Torres Strait Islander Policy (from 3 March 2005)	John Mickel, MLitSt, BA, BEdSt, DipTeach, MP
Minister for Local Government and Planning; Minister for Women (from 11 March 2004); Minister for Environment (from 25 August 2004)	Desley Boyle, BSc(Hons), MPsych, MBA, MP
Minister for Emergency Services	Chris Cummins, MP
Minister for Aboriginal and Torres Strait Islander Policy	Liddy Clark, MP (until 3 March 2005)
Parliamentary Secretaries	Karen Struthers; Neil Roberts; Jo-Ann Miller; Pat Purcell; Lindy Nelson-Carr; Linda Lavarch
Whips
Government Whip	Terry Sullivan
Deputy Government Whip	Phil Reeves
Deputy Government Whip	Rachel Nolan

== Fourth Ministry ==
On 28 July 2005, following the resignation of Deputy Premier Terry Mackenroth from the ministry and from Parliament, a ministry of 19 cabinet ministers and 6 parliamentary secretaries was sworn in. It served until the reconstitution of the Ministry on 23 September 2006 following the 2006 election.

Following a Crime and Misconduct Commission report on 7 December 2005, Gordon Nuttall resigned as a minister. Tim Mulherin was appointed in his place on 12 December.

Office	Minister
Premier; Treasurer (until 2 February 2006)	Peter Beattie, BA, LL.B., MA, MP
Deputy Premier; Treasurer (from 2 February 2006); Minister for State Development, Trade and Innovation	Anna Bligh, BA, MP
Minister for Transport; Minister for Main Roads	Paul Lucas, BEcon, LL.B., MBA, MP
Minister for Employment and Training; Minister for Industrial Relations; Minister for Sport	Tom Barton, MP
Leader of the House; Minister for Public Works and Housing; Minister for Racing	Robert Schwarten, BEd, DipTeach, MP
Minister for Primary Industries and Fisheries	Gordon Nuttall, MP (until 7 December 2005)
Minister for Police and Corrective Services	Judy Spence, BA, DipTeach, MP
Minister for Education; Minister for the Arts	Rod Welford, BA(Hons), LL.B., GradDipLegPrac, MSc(Env), MP
Minister for Health	Stephen Robertson, BA(Hons), MP
Minister for Natural Resources and Mines; Minister for Natural Resources, Mines and Water (2 February-7 August 2006); Minister for Natural Resources and Mines, and Minister Assisting the Premier on Water (from 7 August 2006)	Henry Palaszczuk, DipTeach, MP
Minister for Child Safety	Mike Reynolds, AM, BSW, MA, MP
Minister for Communities; Minister for Disability Services; Minister for Seniors	Warren Pitt, BEdSt, BA, DipTeach, MP
Minister for Tourism; Minister for Fair Trading; Minister for Wine Industry Development	Margaret Keech, B.Econ, GradDipAppLing, MA, MP
Minister for Energy; Minister for Aboriginal and Torres Strait Islander Policy	John Mickel, MLitSt, BA, BEdSt, DipTeach, MP
Minister for Environment; Minister for Local Government and Planning; Minister for Women	Desley Boyle, BSc(Hons), MPsych, MBA, MP
Minister for Small Business; Minister for Information Technology Policy; Minister for Multicultural Affairs	Chris Cummins, MP
Attorney-General; Minister for Justice	Linda Lavarch, LL.B., GradDipLegPrac, MP
Minister for Emergency Services	Pat Purcell, MP
Minister for Primary Industries and Fisheries	Tim Mulherin, MP (from 12 December 2005)
Parliamentary Secretaries	Karen Struthers; Neil Roberts; Jo-Ann Miller; Lindy Nelson-Carr; Kerry Shine; Andrew Fraser
Whips
Government Whip	Terry Sullivan
Deputy Government Whip	Phil Reeves
Deputy Government Whip	Rachel Nolan

== Fifth Ministry ==
On 13 September 2006, following the 2006 election, a ministry of 19 cabinet ministers and 11 parliamentary secretaries was sworn in. It served until the end of the Ministry on 13 September 2007 following Anna Bligh's ascension to the post of Premier, and was followed by the Bligh Ministry.

Linda Lavarch, the Attorney-General, resigned from the Ministry on 18 October 2006 citing depression. Kerry Shine and Margaret Keech assumed her portfolios on 1 November 2006. Craig Wallace was appointed to the available place within the Ministry.

Office	Minister
Premier; Minister for Trade	Peter Beattie, BA, LL.B., MA, MP
Deputy Premier; Treasurer; Minister for Infrastructure	Anna Bligh, BA, MP
Minister for Transport; Minister for Main Roads	Paul Lucas, BEcon, LL.B., MBA, MP
Leader of the House; Minister for Public Works and Housing; Minister for Information and Communication Technology from 12 October 2006)	Robert Schwarten, BEd, DipTeach, MP
Minister for Police and Corrective Services	Judy Spence, BA, DipTeach, MP
Minister for Education and Training; Minister for the Arts	Rod Welford, BA(Hons), LL.B., GradDipLegPrac, MSc(Env), MP
Minister for Health	Stephen Robertson, BA(Hons), MP
Minister for State Development; Minister for Employment; Minister for Industrial Relations	John Mickel, MLitSt, BA, BEdSt, DipTeach, MP
Minister for Communities; Minister for Disability Services; Minister for Seniors; Minister for Youth; Minister for Aboriginal and Torres Strait Islander Partnerships (from 30 January 2007)	Warren Pitt, BEdSt, BA, DipTeach, MP
Minister for Child Safety	Desley Boyle, BSc(Hons), MPsych, MBA, MP
Attorney-General; Minister for Justice; Minister for Women	Linda Lavarch, LL.B., GradDipLegPrac, MP (until 18 October 2006)
Minister for Tourism; Minister for Fair Trading; Minister for Wine Industry Development; Minister for Women (from 1 November 2006)	Margaret Keech, B.Econ, GradDipAppLing, MA, MP
Minister for Primary Industries and Fisheries	Tim Mulherin, MP
Minister for Emergency Services	Pat Purcell, MP
Minister for Local Government and Planning; Minister for Sport	Andrew Fraser, LL.B., BComm, MP
Minister for Mines and Energy	Geoff Wilson, BA(Hons), LL.B., MP
(until 1 November 2006:) Minister for Natural Resources Minister for Water (from 1 November 2006:) Attorney-General Minister for Justice Minister assisting the Premier in Western Queensland	Kerry Shine, LL.B., MP
Minister for Environment and Multiculturalism	Lindy Nelson-Carr, DipTeach, BEd, MEd, MP
Minister for Natural Resources and Water; Minister assisting the Premier in North Queensland	Craig Wallace, BA, MP (from 1 November 2006)
Parliamentary Secretaries	Karen Struthers; Neil Roberts; Craig Wallace (until 1 November 2006); Phil Reeves; Andrew McNamara; Gary Fenlon; Julie Attwood; Ronan Lee; Bonny Barry; Jan Jarratt; Michael Choi; Stirling Hinchliffe (from 1 November 2006); Chris Bombolas (from 10 July 2007)
Whips
Government Whip	Carolyn Male
Deputy Government Whip	Rachel Nolan
Deputy Government Whip	Simon Finn

Preceded by Borbidge Ministry	Beattie Ministry; 1998–2007	Succeeded by Bligh Ministry
