= Electoral results for the district of Lytton =

Queensland, Australia, district election results

This is a list of electoral results for the electoral district of Lytton in Queensland state elections.

== Members for Lytton ==
Member	Party	Term
Tom Burns	Labor	1972–1996
Paul Lucas	Labor	1996–2012
Neil Symes	Liberal National	2012–2015
Joan Pease	Labor	2015–present

== Election results ==
=== Elections in the 2020s ===
2024 Queensland state election: Lytton
Party	Candidate	Votes	%	±%
Labor	Joan Pease	14,003	40.19	−12.02
Liberal National	Chad Gardiner	13,146	37.73	+7.28
Greens	Jade Whitla	3,932	11.28	+0.73
One Nation	David White	1,926	5.53	+1.59
Independent	Craig Moore	1,158	3.32	+3.32
Family First	James (Jim) Vote	681	1.95	+1.95
Total formal votes		34,846	96.77	−0.68
Informal votes		1,164	3.23	+0.68
Turnout		36,010	90.85	+1.09
Two-party-preferred result
Labor	Joan Pease	18,470	53.00	−10.35
Liberal National	Chad Gardiner	16,376	47.00	+10.35
Labor hold		Swing	−10.35	

2020 Queensland state election: Lytton
Party	Candidate	Votes	%	±%
Labor	Joan Pease	17,067	52.21	+3.28
Liberal National	Gordon Walters	9,955	30.45	+6.13
Greens	Ken Austin	3,450	10.55	−0.79
One Nation	Debra Smith	1,289	3.94	−11.46
Informed Medical Options	Georgia Phillips	606	1.85	+1.85
United Australia	Jonathan Spaits	321	0.98	+0.98
Total formal votes		32,688	97.45	+0.69
Informal votes		856	2.55	−0.69
Turnout		33,544	89.76	−0.10
Two-party-preferred result
Labor	Joan Pease	20,708	63.35	+1.33
Liberal National	Gordon Walters	11,980	36.65	−1.33
Labor hold		Swing	+1.33	

=== Elections in the 2010s ===
2017 Queensland state election: Lytton
Party	Candidate	Votes	%	±%
Labor	Joan Pease	15,416	48.9	−0.3
Liberal National	Karren Strahan	7,663	24.3	−11.9
One Nation	Suzanne Black	4,854	15.4	+15.4
Greens	Ken Austin	3,573	11.3	+2.4
Total formal votes		31,506	96.8	−1.4
Informal votes		1,057	3.2	+1.4
Turnout		32,563	89.9	+1.0
Two-party-preferred result
Labor	Joan Pease	19,541	62.0	+2.1
Liberal National	Karren Strahan	11,965	38.0	−2.1
Labor hold		Swing	+2.1	

2015 Queensland state election: Lytton
Party	Candidate	Votes	%	±%
Labor	Joan Pease	14,368	49.00	+9.71
Liberal National	Neil Symes	10,657	36.35	−7.32
Greens	Dave Nelson	2,616	8.92	+0.84
Independent	Tamera Michel	849	2.90	+2.90
Independent	Jamie Evans	831	2.83	+2.83
Total formal votes		29,321	98.11	+0.63
Informal votes		564	1.89	−0.63
Turnout		29,885	91.30	−0.89
Two-party-preferred result
Labor	Joan Pease	16,754	59.80	+11.38
Liberal National	Neil Symes	11,265	40.20	−11.38
Labor gain from Liberal National		Swing	+11.38	

2012 Queensland state election: Lytton
Party	Candidate	Votes	%	±%
Liberal National	Neil Symes	12,181	43.66	+11.43
Labor	Daniel Cheverton	10,961	39.29	−13.20
Greens	Daniel Crute	2,256	8.09	+0.96
Katter's Australian	Jim Vote	1,881	6.74	+6.74
Independent	Russell McVey	618	2.22	+2.22
Total formal votes		27,897	97.49	−0.65
Informal votes		719	2.51	+0.65
Turnout		28,616	92.19	−0.49
Two-party-preferred result
Liberal National	Neil Symes	13,101	51.58	+13.79
Labor	Daniel Cheverton	12,299	48.42	−13.79
Liberal National gain from Labor		Swing	+13.79	

=== Elections in the 2000s ===
2009 Queensland state election: Lytton
Party	Candidate	Votes	%	±%
Labor	Paul Lucas	14,594	52.5	−4.3
Liberal National	Ryan Murphy	8,960	32.2	+3.1
Greens	Daniel Crute	1,982	7.1	−5.0
Independent	Trish Kelly	1,526	5.5	+5.5
DS4SEQ	Neil Plevey	739	2.7	+2.7
Total formal votes		27,801	98.0	
Informal votes		528	2.0	
Turnout		28,329	92.7	
Two-party-preferred result
Labor	Paul Lucas	15,968	62.2	−4.0
Liberal National	Ryan Murphy	9,699	37.8	+4.0
Labor hold		Swing	−4.0	

2006 Queensland state election: Lytton
Party	Candidate	Votes	%	±%
Labor	Paul Lucas	14,398	59.3	−2.5
Liberal	Amanda Wiklund	6,892	28.4	−0.6
Greens	David Wyatt	2,992	12.3	+3.1
Total formal votes		24,282	97.9	+0.0
Informal votes		514	2.1	−0.0
Turnout		24,796	92.0	−1.2
Two-party-preferred result
Labor	Paul Lucas	15,390	66.8	−1.1
Liberal	Amanda Wiklund	7,633	33.2	+1.1
Labor hold		Swing	−1.1	

2004 Queensland state election: Lytton
Party	Candidate	Votes	%	±%
Labor	Paul Lucas	15,128	61.8	−5.1
Liberal	Glenn Weymouth	7,104	29.0	+7.1
Greens	Panche Hadzi-Andonov	2,242	9.2	−2.0
Total formal votes		24,474	97.9	+0.7
Informal votes		527	2.1	−0.7
Turnout		25,001	93.2	−1.5
Two-party-preferred result
Labor	Paul Lucas	15,958	67.9	−6.5
Liberal	Glenn Weymouth	7,553	32.1	+6.5
Labor hold		Swing	−6.5	

2001 Queensland state election: Lytton
Party	Candidate	Votes	%	±%
Labor	Paul Lucas	16,305	66.9	+8.0
Liberal	Vincent Ladner	5,329	21.9	−5.4
Greens	Fay Smith	2,736	11.2	+5.7
Total formal votes		24,370	97.2	
Informal votes		697	2.8	
Turnout		25,067	94.7	
Two-party-preferred result
Labor	Paul Lucas	17,150	74.4	+7.4
Liberal	Vincent Ladner	5,902	25.6	−7.4
Labor hold		Swing	+7.4	

=== Elections in the 1990s ===
1998 Queensland state election: Lytton
Party	Candidate	Votes	%	±%
Labor	Paul Lucas	12,579	59.8	+3.6
Liberal	Tony Murphy	5,859	27.9	−7.1
Democrats	Marianne Dickie	1,385	6.6	+6.6
Greens	Rob Wilson	1,207	5.7	−3.1
Total formal votes		21,030	97.5	−0.9
Informal votes		540	2.5	+0.9
Turnout		21,570	94.3	+1.3
Two-party-preferred result
Labor	Paul Lucas	13,730	67.4	+6.1
Liberal	Tony Murphy	6,626	32.6	−6.1
Labor hold		Swing	+6.1	

1996 Lytton state by-election
Party	Candidate	Votes	%	±%
Labor	Paul Lucas	10,832	54.7	−1.5
Liberal	Jenny Mansell	5,480	27.7	−7.3
Democrats	Marianne Dickie	1,223	6.2	+6.2
Shooters	Wendy Kelly	750	3.8	+3.8
Independent	Nigel Freemarijuana	608	3.1	+3.1
Greens	Norma Nord	570	2.9	−5.9
Independent	B Groom	147	0.7	+0.7
Independent	B Richardson	131	0.7	+0.7
Independent	Steve Purtill	47	0.2	+0.2
Total formal votes		19,788	98.9	+0.4
Informal votes		229	1.1	−0.4
Turnout		20,017	88.1	
Two-party-preferred result
Labor	Paul Lucas	11,952	66.1	+4.8
Liberal	Jenny Mansell	6,129	33.9	−4.8
Labor hold		Swing	+4.8	

1995 Queensland state election: Lytton
Party	Candidate	Votes	%	±%
Labor	Tom Burns	11,395	56.2	−13.6
Liberal	Jenny Mansell	7,098	35.0	+4.8
Greens	Bert Nord	1,786	8.8	+8.8
Total formal votes		20,279	98.4	+0.8
Informal votes		321	1.6	−0.8
Turnout		20,600	93.0	
Two-party-preferred result
Labor	Tom Burns	12,266	61.3	−8.5
Liberal	Jenny Mansell	7,740	38.7	+8.5
Labor hold		Swing	−8.5	

1992 Queensland state election: Lytton
Party	Candidate	Votes	%	±%
Labor	Tom Burns	14,465	69.8	+1.6
Liberal	Tom McKaskill	6,248	30.2	+13.6
Total formal votes		20,713	97.7	
Informal votes		499	2.3	
Turnout		21,212	93.7	
Labor hold		Swing	−0.7	

=== Elections in the 1980s ===
1989 Queensland state election: Lytton
Party	Candidate	Votes	%	±%
Labor	Tom Burns	14,243	71.6	+9.1
Liberal	Peter Dutton	3,313	16.7	+3.1
National	Victor Sirl	2,328	11.7	−12.2
Total formal votes		19,884	97.5	−0.5
Informal votes		511	2.5	+0.5
Turnout		20,395	92.8	+0.4
Two-party-preferred result
Labor	Tom Burns	14,416	72.5	+6.2
Liberal	Peter Dutton	5,468	27.5	−6.2
Labor hold		Swing	+6.2	

1986 Queensland state election: Lytton
Party	Candidate	Votes	%	±%
Labor	Tom Burns	11,472	62.5	−8.9
National	Liz Upton	4,382	23.9	+23.9
Liberal	Daryl Mercer	2,503	13.6	−15.0
Total formal votes		18,357	98.0	
Informal votes		369	2.0	
Turnout		18,726	92.4	
Two-party-preferred result
Labor	Tom Burns	12,171	66.3	+3.2
National	Liz Upton	6,186	33.7	+33.7
Labor hold		Swing	+3.2	

1983 Queensland state election: Lytton
Party	Candidate	Votes	%	±%
Labor	Tom Burns	10,670	71.4	−2.2
Liberal	Moyra Bidstrup	4,276	28.6	+2.2
Total formal votes		14,946	97.6	−0.4
Informal votes		364	2.4	+0.4
Turnout		15,310	92.8	+3.4
Labor hold		Swing	−2.2	

1980 Queensland state election: Lytton
Party	Candidate	Votes	%	±%
Labor	Tom Burns	10,543	73.6	+6.6
Liberal	Moyra Bidstrup	3,784	26.4	−6.6
Total formal votes		14,327	98.0	−0.5
Informal votes		297	2.0	+0.5
Turnout		14,624	89.4	−2.8
Labor hold		Swing	+6.6	

=== Elections in the 1970s ===
1977 Queensland state election: Lytton
Party	Candidate	Votes	%	±%
Labor	Tom Burns	9,809	67.0	+10.3
Liberal	Rodney Bristow	4,835	33.0	−10.3
Total formal votes		14,644	98.5	
Informal votes		219	1.5	
Turnout		14,863	92.2	
Labor hold		Swing	+10.3	

1974 Queensland state election: Lytton
Party	Candidate	Votes	%	±%
Labor	Tom Burns	8,165	56.7	−11.5
Liberal	John Ivers	6,225	43.3	+17.5
Total formal votes		14,390	98.5	+0.1
Informal votes		213	1.5	−0.1
Turnout		14,603	90.2	−4.5
Labor hold		Swing	−12.6	

1972 Queensland state election: Lytton
Party	Candidate	Votes	%	±%
Labor	Tom Burns	8,376	68.2	
Liberal	John Ottway	3,163	25.8	
Queensland Labor	John O'Connell	735	6.0	
Total formal votes		12,274	98.4	
Informal votes		200	1.6	
Turnout		12,474	94.7	
Two-party-preferred result
Labor	Tom Burns	8,500	69.3	+1.7
Liberal	John Ottway	3,774	30.7	−1.7
Labor hold		Swing	+1.7	
