= 1998 Mulgrave state by-election =

- 5 December 1998

Electoral district of Mulgrave in the Queensland Legislative Assembly

	First party	Second party	Third party
Candidate	Warren Pitt	Naomi Wilson	Peter Boniface
Party	Labor	National	One Nation
Primary vote	9,446	8,550	3,470
Percentage	42.35%	38.33%	15.56%
Swing	▲5.33	▲8.38	▼15.48
TPP	50.63%	49.37%
TPP swing	▲4.80	▲49.37
MP before election
Charles Rappolt
One Nation
Elected MP
Warren Pitt
Labor

The 1998 Mulgrave state by-election was held on 5 December 1998 to elect the member for Mulgrave in the Queensland Legislative Assembly, following the resignation of One Nation MP Charles Rappolt.

Labor Party candidate and former member Warren Pitt won the by-election with 50.6% of the two-party-preferred vote against the National Party.

Pitt's victory meant Mulgrave was held by three separate political parties with three different members in 1998. It was also the last time that a sitting Queensland government gained a seat in a by-election until Hinchinbrook in 2025.

== Background ==
Charles Rappolt entered parliament as one of eleven One Nation candidates elected at the 1998 state election. Rappolt won the seat of Mulgrave with 54.2% of the two party preferred vote. However, Rappolt found it difficult to cope with the pressures of public life and resigned his seat just four months into his term.

== Candidates ==
The by-election pitted two former members for Mulgrave against each other. The National Party endorsed Naomi Wilson who had held the seat from 1995 to 1998 before her defeat to Rappolt at the 1998 state election. The Labor Party preselected Warren Pitt, member for Mulgrave from 1989 to 1995 before his defeat to Wilson at the 1995 state election. Pitt had also unsuccessfully stood for the seat at the 1998 state election, and would have won if not for Coalition preferences leaking to Rappolt.

One Nation chose Peter Boniface to defend the seat.

== Results ==
With One Nation failing to repeat their strong state election performance, the contest reverted to a more typical Labor versus National contest. Labor's Warren Pitt prevailed narrowly.

1998 Mulgrave state by-election
Party	Candidate	Votes	%	±%
Labor	Warren Pitt	9,446	42.35	+5.33
National	Naomi Wilson	8,550	38.33	+8.38
One Nation	Peter Boniface	3,470	15.56	−15.48
Greens	Jonathan Metcalfe	573	2.57	+2.57
Independent	Norm Mathison	266	1.19	+1.19
Total formal votes		22,205	98.99	
Informal votes		228	1.01	
Turnout		22,433	85.83	
Two-party-preferred result
Labor	Warren Pitt	10,394	50.63	+4.80
National	Naomi Wilson	10,135	49.37	+49.37
Labor gain from One Nation				

== Aftermath ==
Where previously the Labor government of Peter Beattie had governed in the minority—they held 44 seats in an 89-seat parliament and depended upon the support of independent MP Peter Wellington—their victory in Mulgrave gave the government an outright majority of 45 seats.

== See also ==
- List of Queensland state by-elections
