= Electoral results for the district of Jordan =

This is a list of electoral results for the electoral district of Jordan in Queensland state elections.

== Members for Jordan ==
Member	Party	Term
Charis Mullen	Labor	2017–present

== Election results ==
=== Elections in the 2020s ===
2024 Queensland state election: Jordan
Party	Candidate	Votes	%	±%
Labor	Charis Mullen	19,225	48.57	−6.87
Liberal National	Kevin Burns	12,300	31.08	+8.39
Greens	Dung Tran	4,106	10.37	−0.37
One Nation	Sabeh Abou Chahla	2,866	7.24	−3.88
Libertarian	Michael Pucci	1,085	2.74	+2.74
Total formal votes		39,582	95.55	−0.98
Informal votes		1,842	4.45	+0.98
Turnout		41,424	88.98	+0.58
Two-party-preferred result
Labor	Charis Mullen	23,729	59.95	−7.15
Liberal National	Kevin Burns	15,853	40.05	+7.15
Labor hold		Swing	−7.15	

2020 Queensland state election: Jordan
Party	Candidate	Votes	%	±%
Labor	Charis Mullen	18,471	55.44	+15.82
Liberal National	Andrew Mooney	7,560	22.69	+8.27
One Nation	Neil Symes	3,705	11.12	−7.76
Greens	Navdeep Singh Sidhu	3,579	10.74	+3.31
Total formal votes		33,315	96.53	+2.79
Informal votes		1,197	3.47	−2.79
Turnout		34,512	88.40	−0.64
Two-party-preferred result
Labor	Charis Mullen	22,356	67.10	+7.10
Liberal National	Andrew Mooney	10,959	32.90	−7.10
Labor hold		Swing	+7.10	

=== Elections in the 2010s ===
2017 Queensland state election: Jordan
Party	Candidate	Votes	%	±%
Labor	Charis Mullen	11,026	39.6	−12.8
One Nation	Michael Pucci	5,255	18.9	+15.8
Liberal National	Duncan Murray	4,012	14.4	−17.3
Independent	Phil Cutcliffe	2,682	9.6	+9.6
Independent	Steve Hodgson	2,293	8.2	+8.2
Greens	Steven Purcell	2,068	7.4	−0.6
Consumer Rights	Peter Ervik	489	1.8	+1.8
Total formal votes		27,825	93.7	−4.0
Informal votes		1,858	6.3	+4.0
Turnout		29,683	89.0	+2.4
Two-candidate-preferred result
Labor	Charis Mullen	16,669	59.9	−3.6
One Nation	Michael Pucci	11,156	40.1	+40.1
Labor hold		Swing	−3.6	
