= Naomi Wilson =

Australian politician (born 1940)

Naomi Wilson OAM

Member of the Queensland Legislative Assembly for Mulgrave
- In office 15 July 1995 – 13 June 1998
- Preceded by: Warren Pitt
- Succeeded by: Charles Rappolt

Queensland Minister for Community Services, Youth and Families
- In office February 1998 – June 1998
- Succeeded by: Anna Bligh

Personal details
- Born: 27 January 1940 (age 86) Arusha, Tanganyika, East Africa
- Party: National Party
- Occupation: Teacher, Politician

Naomi Kate Wynn Wilson OAM (born 27 January 1940) is a Tanzanian-born Australian politician and former teacher who was a National Party member of the Legislative Assembly of Queensland from 1995 to 1998, representing the district of Mulgrave.

== Family ==
Wilson, who was born in Arusha in Tanganyika (now Tanzania), is the daughter of the Welsh Anglican Bishop of Central Tanganyika, William (Bill) Wynn Jones, and of Ruth L. Minton Taylor.

Her paternal grandfather Matthew Tertius Jones (1853 - 1912) was a partner of the Welsh international chartered shipbrokerage M. Jones and Bro. (1856 - 1942) of Swansea Docks that had been founded by her 2nd-great grandfather Matthew Jones Senior (1800 - 1867).

Her maternal great-grandmother was the former senator and Premier of Tasmania, Henry Dobson.

== Career ==
Wilson was a Mulgrave Shire councillor from 1991 to 1995. Wilson entered state parliament at the 1995 state election by defeating incumbent Labor Party MP Warren Pitt for the seat of Mulgrave. When the National Party came to power under the leadership Rob Borbidge in February 1996, Wilson was appointed Parliamentary Secretary to the Minister for Families, Youth and Community Care. In February 1998 she won promotion to the ministry, becoming the Minister for Families, Youth and Community Care. Wilson held this position until her defeat the following June at the 1998 state election, where she finished in third place behind Labor's Warren Pitt and victorious One Nation candidate Charles Rappolt.

When Rappolt prematurely retired in late 1998 Wilson stood as the endorsed National Party candidate for the Mulgrave by-election, in which she lost slightly to Labor's Warren Pitt. Wilson stood as the National Party candidate in the neighbouring district Cairns during the 2001 state election in which she was defeated by incumbent Labor MP Desley Boyle.

== Ancestry ==
Ancestors of Naomi Wilson

16. Matthew Jones Senior (1800 - 1867) of Glamorgan
8. Matthew Jones Junior (1828 - 1864) (elder brother of Lieutenant-Colonel William Matthew Jones VD)
17. Sarah Baugh (1802 - 1876)
4. Matthew Tertius Jones (elder brother of Edwin Price Jones (1855 - 1924), Vice-Consul for Chile)
9. Jane Richards (1827 - 1856)
2. The Rt. Rev. William Wynn Jones (brother of The Rev. Matthew Kenneth Jones MBE)
1. Naomi Wilson
3. Ruth L. Minton Taylor
28. John Dobson of Hobart, previously of Gateshead
14. Henry Dobson, Premier of Tasmania
29. Kate Willis (daughter of Richard Willis of the Tasmanian Legislative Council)

Parliament of Queensland
Preceded by Warren Pitt	Member for Mulgrave; 1995–1998	Succeeded by Charles Rappolt
