= John Mickel (politician) =

Australian politician

The Honourable John Mickel
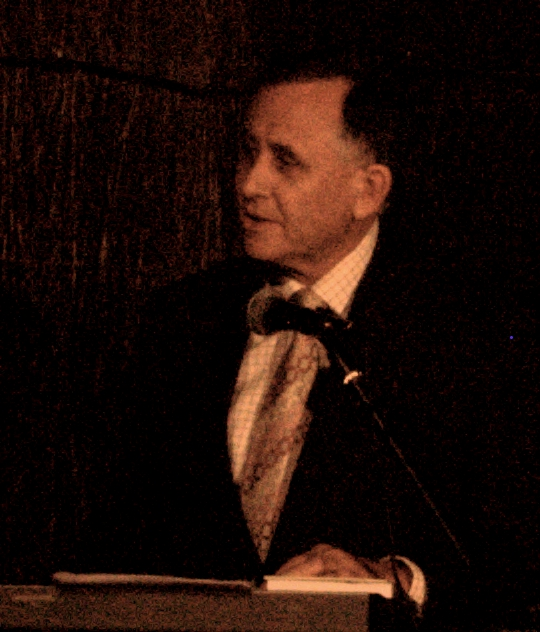
- John Mickel speaks at a book launch in Brisbane, Australia in June 2011

Speaker of the Legislative Assembly of Queensland
- In office 21 April 2009 – 14 May 2012
- Preceded by: Mike Reynolds
- Succeeded by: Fiona Simpson

Minister for Environment of Queensland
- In office 12 February 2004 – 25 August 2004
- Premier: Peter Beattie
- Preceded by: Dean Wells
- Succeeded by: Desley Boyle (as Environment, Local Government, Planning and Women)

Minister for Energy of Queensland
- In office 25 August 2004 – 13 September 2006
- Premier: Peter Beattie
- Succeeded by: Geoff Wilson (as Energy and Mines)

Minister for Aboriginal and Torres Strait Islanders Policy of Queensland
- In office 3 March 2005 – 13 September 2006
- Premier: Peter Beattie
- Preceded by: Elizabeth Clark
- Succeeded by: Department abolished

Minister for State Development, Industrial Relations, and Employment of Queensland
- In office 13 September 2006 – 13 September 2007
- Premier: Peter Beattie
- Preceded by: Anna Bligh (State Development); Tom Barton (Employment and IR)
- Succeeded by: Desley Boyle (Development); Himself (Employment and IR)

Minister for Transport, Trade, Employment and Industrial Relations of Queensland
- In office 13 September 2007 – 26 March 2009
- Premier: Anna Bligh
- Preceded by: Peter Beattie (as Trade); Paul Lucas (Transport); Himself (IR and Employment)
- Succeeded by: Rachel Nolan (as Transport); Stephen Robertson (as Trade); Andrew Fraser (Employment); Cameron Dick (IR)

Member of the Queensland Parliament for Logan
- In office 13 June 1998 – 24 March 2012
- Preceded by: Wayne Goss
- Succeeded by: Michael Pucci

Personal details
- Party: Labor

Reginald John Mickel (born August 1953) is an Australian politician. He was the Speaker of the Legislative Assembly of Queensland and the Labor member for Logan until the 2012 election. He was succeeded by Fiona Simpson as Speaker, as he did not contest the 2012 election.

== Early life ==
Born in Murgon, Queensland, he went to school at St Laurence's College and later attended the University of Queensland where he studied literature and education.

== Political career ==
In 1979, he joined the Labor Party and was an adviser to federal MP David Beddall. He was later a senior adviser to Queensland Premier Wayne Goss and to Health Minister (later Premier) Peter Beattie.

In 1998, he was elected to the Legislative Assembly of Queensland as the Labor member for Logan. He was a minister in various portfolios from 2004 to 2009. He served in Beattie's initial Cabinet as Environment Minister in 2004, but was transferred to Energy in August of that year. In March 2005, he added the Aboriginal and Torres Strait Islanders Policy portfolio. In September 2006, he became Minister for State Development, Industrial Relations and Employment. When Anna Bligh replaced Beattie as Premier, Mickel's portfolio was altered, becoming Transport, Trade, Employment and Industrial Relations. He was dropped from the ministry after Labor's re-election in the 2009 state election, but was elected Speaker when the Legislative Assembly convened in April 2009.

Mickel announced on 10 August 2011 that he would step down at the 2012 election.

== Family life ==
Mickel is married; he has three children.
