= Max Menzel =

Australian politician

Member of the Queensland Legislative Assembly for Mulgrave
- In office 29 November 1980 – 2 December 1989
- Preceded by: Roy Armstrong
- Succeeded by: Warren Pitt

Personal details
- Born: Max Richard Menzel; 30 March 1941 (age 85) Tully, Queensland, Australia
- Party: National Party
- Spouse: Margaret Dall'Alba (m.1981)
- Children: 4

Max Richard Menzel (born 30 March 1941) is a former Australian politician.

He was born in Tully in Queensland to Richard Franz Menzel and Dulcie Margaret (née Kelly) on 30 March 1941. Max's father and uncle had migrated from Germany to Australia. On 28 August 1981 he married Margaret Frances Dall'Alba, with whom he had 4 children, 3 sons and a daughter; Carl Richard Menzel, Max Francis Menzel, Peter Gerard Menzel, and Katelyn Margaret Menzel.

In 1980 he was elected to the Queensland Legislative Assembly as the National Party member for Mulgrave. He was Chairman of Committees from 1983 to 1986. Menzel was defeated in 1989.

Following his defeat, Menzel left the National Party after the state executive of the National Party led by President at the time, Robert Sparkes overrode his endorsement despite his electorate council supporting him overwhelmingly with only 3 opposing him out of 40 delegates, in an event Max considered as retribution for supporting former Queensland Premier Sir Joh Bjelke-Petersen with whom Mr. Sparkes had fallen out with. He ran for Mulgrave as an independent in 1992 and was unsuccessful he went on farming on the family farm at Miriwini and in 1995 decided to sell and move to the Burdekin and expand his operation, his wife Margaret ran for the federal seat of Dawson in 2004 as part of a loose group of independents endorsed by Bob Katter.

In August 2012, he was elected president of Katter's Australian Party following the dismissal of Rowell Walton. Menzel resigned from both the position and the party in April 2013.

Parliament of Queensland
Preceded by Roy Armstrong	Member for Mulgrave; 1980–1989	Succeeded by Warren Pitt
