= Warren Pitt =

Australian politician (1948–2025)

The Honourable Warren Pitt AM

Minister for Main Roads
- In office 13 September 2007 – 25 March 2009
- Premier: Anna Bligh
- Preceded by: Paul Lucas
- Succeeded by: Craig Wallace

Minister for Local Government
- In office 13 September 2007 – 25 March 2009
- Premier: Anna Bligh
- Preceded by: Andrew Fraser
- Succeeded by: Desley Boyle

Minister for Communities and Disability Services
- In office 12 February 2004 – 13 September 2007
- Premier: Peter Beattie
- Preceded by: Position Created
- Succeeded by: Lindy Nelson-Carr

Minister for Business, Industry and Regional Development
- In office 23 February 1995 – 31 July 1995
- Premier: Wayne Goss
- Preceded by: Jim Elder
- Succeeded by: Ken Hayward

Queensland Government Chief Whip
- In office 1 October 1992 – 22 February 1995
- Premier: Wayne Goss
- Preceded by: Bill Prest
- Succeeded by: Don Livingstone

Member of the Queensland Legislative Assembly for Mulgrave
- In office 5 December 1998 – 20 March 2009
- Preceded by: Charles Rappolt
- Succeeded by: Curtis Pitt
- In office 2 December 1989 – 15 July 1995
- Preceded by: Max Menzel
- Succeeded by: Naomi Wilson

Personal details
- Born: Warren Pitt; 14 March 1948 Cairns, Queensland, Australia
- Died: 7 February 2025 (aged 76) Gordonvale, Queensland, Australia
- Party: Labor
- Spouse: Linda Pitt
- Children: 2, including Curtis
- Occupation: Teacher

Warren Pitt (14 March 1948 – 7 February 2025) was an Australian politician. He was a Labor member of the Legislative Assembly of Queensland from 1989 to 1995 and 1998 to 2009.

== Background ==
Born in Cairns, Pitt was a school teacher before entering politics. He underwent national service and was an army reservist from 1969 to 1975 and was active in the local community, being recognised as Mulgrave Shire Citizen of the Year in 1983.

Pitt died on 7 February 2025, at the age of 76.

== Political career ==
Pitt was elected to state parliament as the member for Mulgrave at the 1989 state election defeating sitting National Party MP Max Menzel. Pitt was himself defeated two terms later at the 1995 state election by the Nationals' Naomi Wilson. Pitt sought a rematch at the 1998 state election, but leakage of Coalition preferences allowed Charles Rappolt of One Nation to defeat Pitt.

Rappolt resigned only four months into his term, and Pitt narrowly defeated Wilson in the resulting by-election, providing Labor Premier Peter Beattie with a majority in his own right (previously Beattie's government had to rely on the support of independent MP Peter Wellington).

Fortuitously, Pitt served all his time in parliament as a member of the majority party. Consequently, he served in a number of government roles. In the government of Wayne Goss, Pitt served as Deputy Government Whip from March to October 1992, Government Whip from October 1992 to February 1995, and Minister for Business, Industry and Regional Development from February to July 1995.

In the government of Peter Beattie, Pitt served as Chair of the Scrutiny of Legislation Committee from May 2001 to January 2004 until he became Minister for Communities and Disability Services in February 2004. He retained the portfolio for years to come, and to his responsibilities were added: Seniors in April 2004, Youth in September 2006, and Aboriginal and Torres Strait Islander Partnerships in January 2007. That gave Pitt the unusually long title of "Minister for Communities, Disability Services, Aboriginal and Torres Strait Islander Partnerships, Seniors and Youth", which he retained until Beattie's retirement in September 2007.

In the government of Anna Bligh, Pitt served as Minister for Main Roads and Local Government from September 2007 until his retirement in February 2009.

Upon his retirement, Pitt's son Curtis was preselected as the Labor candidate in the district of Mulgrave. Curtis Pitt successfully retained the seat for the Labor Party at the 2009 state election, holding the seat until his retirement from politics in 2024.

Political offices
Preceded by Judy Spence	Minister for Disability Services and Seniors; 2004–2007	Succeeded by Lindy Nelson-Carr
New title	Minister for Communities; 2004–2007	Succeeded by Lindy Nelson-Carr
Preceded by Jim Elder	Minister for Business, Industry and Regional Development; 1995	Succeeded by Ken Hayward
Parliament of Queensland
Preceded by Max Menzel	Member for Mulgrave; 1989–1998	Succeeded by Naomi Wilson
Preceded by Charles Rappolt	Member for Mulgrave; 2001–2009	Succeeded by Curtis Pitt
