= Electoral district of Mount Coot-tha =

Mount Coot-tha Queensland—Legislative Assembly
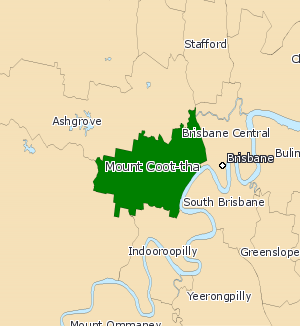
- Mount Coot-tha (2008–2017)
- State: Queensland
- Dates current: 1950–2017
- Namesake: Mount Coot-tha
- Electors: 30,979 (2015)
- Area: 29 km^{2} (11.2 sq mi)
- Coordinates: 27°28′S 152°58′E

Mount Coot-tha was an electoral district in the Legislative Assembly of Queensland in the state of Queensland, Australia from 1950 to 2017.

The electoral district encompassed suburbs in Brisbane's inner-west, including Milton, Auchenflower, Paddington, Red Hill, Bardon and parts of the suburbs of Toowong, Kelvin Grove and Ashgrove. The district took its name from nearby Mount Coot-tha.

Mount Coot-tha was consistently the strongest-performing Queensland state seat for the Greens—22.2 per cent in 2015, 20.7 per cent in 2012 and 23.1 per cent in 2009.

Mount Coot-tha was abolished in a redistribution in 2016 which took effect at the 2017 state election. Most of its territory, including Mount Coot-tha, was merged with the bulk of Indooroopilly to form Maiwar, with other portions being transferred to the districts of Cooper and McConnel.

== Members for Mount Coot-tha ==
Member	Party	Term
Kenneth Morris	Liberal	1950–1963
Bill Lickiss	Liberal	1963–1986
Lyle Schuntner	Liberal	1986–1989
Wendy Edmond	Labor	1989–2004
Andrew Fraser	Labor	2004–2012
Saxon Rice	Liberal National	2012–2015
Steven Miles	Labor	2015–2017
