= Saxon Rice =

Australian politician

Member of the Queensland Parliament for Mount Coot-tha
- In office 24 March 2012 – 31 January 2015
- Preceded by: Andrew Fraser
- Succeeded by: Steven Miles

Personal details
- Born: 15 June 1976 (age 49)
- Party: Liberal National
- Profession: Businesswoman

Saxon Rice (born 15 June 1976) is an Australian Liberal National politician who was the member of the Legislative Assembly of Queensland for Mount Coot-tha from 2012 to 2015, having defeated Deputy Premier and Treasurer Andrew Fraser at the 2012 state election. She was appointed Assistant Minister for Technical and Further Education on 3 April 2012.

Rice has a Master of International Law from the Australian National University and a Bachelor of Economics from Sydney University.

Parliament of Queensland
Preceded by Andrew Fraser	Member for Mount Coot-tha; 2012–2015	Succeeded by Steven Miles
