= Charles Rappolt =

Australian politician (1939–1999)

Member of the Queensland Legislative Assembly for Mulgrave
- In office 13 June 1998 – 4 November 1998
- Preceded by: Naomi Wilson
- Succeeded by: Warren Pitt

Personal details
- Born: Charles Robert Rappolt; 23 August 1939 Cairns, Queensland, Australia
- Died: 2 August 1999 (aged 59) Devonport, Auckland, New Zealand
- Party: Pauline Hanson's One Nation
- Spouse: Sandra Higgins
- Children: 3
- Profession: Financier; Politician

Military service
- Allegiance: Commonwealth of Australia
- Branch/service: Australian Army Reserve
- Years of service: 1957–1961
- Rank: Second Lieutenant
- Battles/wars: Vietnam War

Charles Robert "Charlie" Rappolt (23 August 1939 – 2 August 1999) was an Australian politician. A member of Pauline Hanson's One Nation Party, Rappolt spent five turbulent months in the Parliament of Queensland in 1998.

A native of Cairns, Rappolt held a variety of jobs before he entered politics. He served in the Citizens' Military Force from 1957 until 1961. In 1961 he began working as an agent for his brother, described by One Nation leader Bill Feldman as a musician "of some renown". From 1974 to 1978 he ran his own building company, and was a licensed environmental auditor in Queensland and Victoria. During his time as an environmental auditor, Rappolt became interested in mining, and he soon became a mine manager, prospector and financier. He was also a commercial pilot, flying aeroplanes and helicopters for a time. Another interest of Rappolt's was soccer, and he volunteered as a coach and referee at junior level.

On 13 June 1998, Rappolt was elected to the Legislative Assembly of Queensland, running as the One Nation candidate for the Cairns-area seat of Mulgrave. His parliamentary career lasted a little over four months, and he suffered constant media attacks after the revelation that his partner, Sandra Higgins, had taken out a domestic violence order against him. On 4 November, Rappolt resigned, citing the combined pressures of political life, ill health, and the Queensland press. The resulting by-election was won by Labor candidate Warren Pitt, who had earlier held the then-marginal seat from 1989 until 1995. Pitt's victory gave Labor a majority in its own right; indeed, Mulgrave was one of seven seats that would have gone to Labor in the 1998 election if not for leakage of Coalition preferences.

Less than a week after his resignation, Rappolt attempted suicide and was hospitalised with severe depression. After his recovery he sought A$295,000 in damages from the Queensland government, arguing that his stint in Parliament had left him a psychotic manic depressive. He moved to New Zealand in 1999, in an attempt to flee the pressure of public life in Queensland. He was found dead in his home in Auckland, on 2 August 1999, apparently after having hanged himself. At a condolence motion in the Queensland Assembly, One Nation leader Bill Feldman launched a blistering attack on the Courier Mail, claiming that the newspaper was responsible for Rappolt's suicide attempts.

Rappolt was survived by his partner Sandra Higgins, and three children.

Parliament of Queensland
| Preceded by Naomi Wilson | Member for Mulgrave; 1998 | Succeeded by Warren Pitt |
