= Desley Boyle =

Australian politician

The Honourable Desley Boyle B.Sc. (Hons), M.Psych, M.B.A
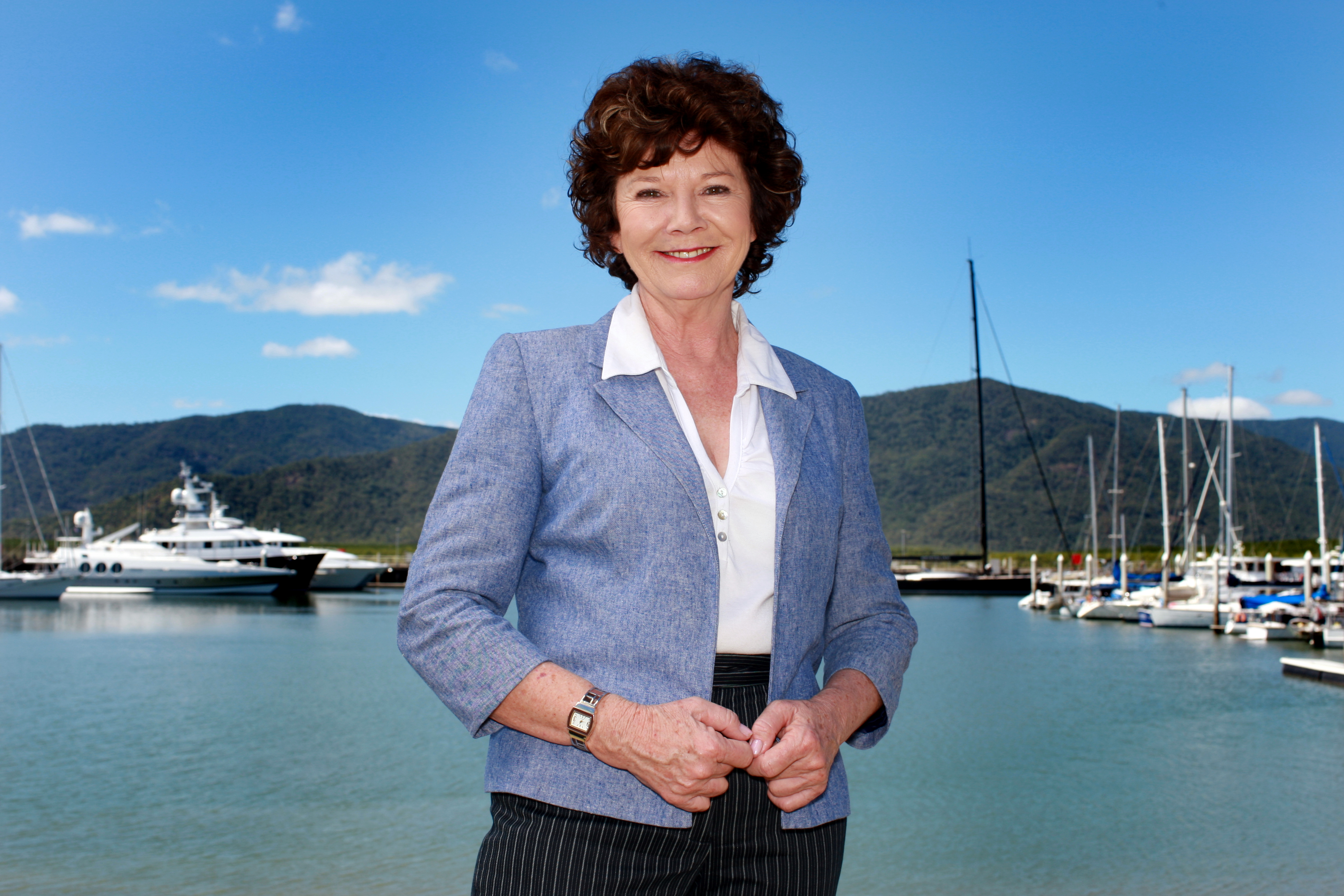

Minister for Local Government of Queensland Local Government and Planning (2004–2006)
- In office 26 March 2009 – 21 February 2011
- Premier: Anna Bligh
- Preceded by: Andrew Fraser
- Succeeded by: Paul Lucas
- In office 12 February 2004 – 13 September 2006
- Premier: Peter Beattie
- Preceded by: Nita Cunningham
- Succeeded by: Andrew Fraser

Minister for Aboriginal and Torres Strait Islander Partnerships of Queensland
- In office 25 March 2009 – 21 February 2011
- Premier: Anna Bligh
- Preceded by: Lindy Nelson-Carr
- Succeeded by: Curtis Pitt

Minister for Tourism, Regional Development and Industry of Queensland
- In office 19 September 2007 – 26 March 2009
- Premier: Anna Bligh
- Preceded by: Margaret Keech Tourism; John Mickel (as State Development and Industrial Relations)
- Succeeded by: Jan Jarratt

Minister for Child Safety of Queensland
- In office 13 September 2006 – 19 September 2007
- Premier: Peter Beattie
- Preceded by: Michael Reynolds
- Succeeded by: Margaret Keech

Minister for the Environment of Queensland
- In office 25 August 2004 – 13 September 2006
- Premier: Peter Beattie
- Preceded by: John Mickel
- Succeeded by: Lindy Nelson-Carr

Minister for Women of Queensland
- In office 11 March 2004 – 13 September 2006
- Premier: Peter Beattie
- Preceded by: New office
- Succeeded by: Linda Lavarch

Member of the Queensland Parliament for Cairns
- In office 13 June 1998 – 24 March 2012
- Preceded by: Keith De Lacy
- Succeeded by: Gavin King

Personal details
- Born: 29 March 1948 (age 77) Newcastle, New South Wales
- Party: Labor
- Children: 3

Desley Carole Boyle (born 29 March 1948) is a former Labor politician. Boyle represented the electoral district of Cairns, Queensland in the Legislative Assembly of Queensland and was elected in the 1998 state election and served until 2012.

== Early life and career ==
Boyle was the director and clinical psychologist for Desley Boyle and Associates, in Cairns. She held a position with the Cairns local government from 1988 to 1994, including two years as deputy mayor.

== Member of parliament ==
She served on the Parliamentary Crime and Misconduct Committee between 2002 and 2004.

=== Beattie Ministry ===
Boyle held various positions in the Beattie Ministry. She was appointed Minister for Local Government and Planning in February 2004, and added the new post of Minister for Women a month later. In August 2004, she also added Minister for Minister for the Environment. In a September 2006 reshuffle, she was appointed Minister for Child Safety.

=== Bligh Ministry ===
When Anna Bligh took over from Beattie in September 2007, Boyle was appointed Minister for Tourism, Regional Development and Industry. Following the 2009 election, she returned to the Local Government portfolio as Minister for Local Government and Aboriginal and Torres Strait Islander Partnerships.

On 17 February 2011, Boyle announced that she would be retiring at the 2012 state election and stood down from Cabinet four days later.

At the election, Labor lost the seat to Gavin King of the Liberal National Party.

== Personal life ==
Desley lives in Cairns, Tropical North Queensland. She has three children and three grandchildren. Her hobbies include theatre, film and contemporary music.

Political offices
Preceded by Terry Mackenroth	Minister for Local Government and Planning; 2004 – 2006	Succeeded by Andrew Fraser
Preceded by Mike Reynolds	Minister for Child Safety; 2006 – 2007	Succeeded by Margaret Keech
New title	Minister for Women; 2004 – 2006	Succeeded by Margaret Keech
Preceded by John Mickel	Minister for the Environment; 2004 – 2006	Succeeded by Lindy Nelson-Carr
Preceded by Margaret Keech	Minister for Tourism; 2007 – 2009	Succeeded by Peter Lawlor
New title	Minister for Regional Development; 2007 – 2009	Succeeded by Tim Mulherin
New title	Minister for Industry; 2007 – 2009	Portfolio abolished
Parliament of Queensland
Preceded by Keith De Lacy	Member for Cairns; 1998 – 2012	Succeeded by Gavin King
