= Lyle Schuntner =

Australian politician (born 1936)

Member of the Queensland Legislative Assembly for Mount Coot-tha
- In office 1 November 1986 – 2 December 1989
- Preceded by: Bill Lickiss
- Succeeded by: Wendy Edmond

Personal details
- Born: Lyle Thomas Schuntner; 2 December 1936 (age 89) Bowen, Queensland, Australia
- Party: Liberal Party
- Spouse: Valerie Margaret Shannon
- Education: University of Queensland
- Occupation: Teacher, President, Queensland Teachers Union

Lyle Thomas Schuntner (born 2 December 1936) is an Australian former teacher, teachers' union president, credit union chairman and politician. He was a Liberal Party member of the Queensland Legislative Assembly from 1986 to 1989, representing the electorate of Mount Coot-tha. He was also the president of the Queensland Teachers Union from 1978 to 1986.

Schuntner was born in Bowen and attended Crows Nest, Kelvin Grove and Mitchelton state primary schools and the Brisbane State High School. He subsequently studied arts and education at the University of Queensland, undertook national service in the Royal Australian Navy in 1956, and served in the naval reserve from 1956 to 1960. He was a teacher from 1956 to 1977, when he was elected president of the Queensland Teachers Union; he served in that capacity until 1986.

Schuntner was elected to the Legislative Assembly at the 1986 state election, winning the seat of Mt. Coot-tha after an electoral redistribution, despite a serious challenge from their former coalition partner, the National Party. He served as the Liberal spokesperson for education and training during his term. He was defeated by Labor candidate Wendy Edmond at the 1989 state election, as Labor won office in Queensland for the first time since 1959.

Schuntner returned to education after his election defeat working as the Manager, Review Administration, Board of Senior Secondary School Studies. He was the Liberal candidate for Burleigh at the 1992 state election, losing to National Party candidate Judy Gamin.

Schuntner was Chairman of the Queensland Teachers' Credit Union continuously from December, 1985 until retiring in 2008.

Parliament of Queensland
Preceded by Bill Lickiss	Member for Mount Coot-tha; 1986–1989	Succeeded by Wendy Edmond
