= Bill Lickiss =

Australian politician

The Hon Bill Lickiss QGM

Deputy Leader of the Queensland Liberal Party
- In office 3 November 1983 – November 1986
- Leader: William Knox
- Preceded by: Angus Innes
- Succeeded by: Angus Innes

Attorney-General of Queensland and Minister for Justice
- In office 13 August 1976 – 23 December 1980
- Premier: Joh Bjelke-Petersen
- Preceded by: William Knox
- Succeeded by: Sam Doumany

Minister for Survey, Valuation, Urban and Regional Affairs
- In office 10 March 1975 – 13 August 1976
- Premier: Joh Bjelke-Petersen
- Preceded by: Position Created
- Succeeded by: John Greenwood

Member of the Queensland Legislative Assembly for Moggill
- In office 1 November 1986 – 2 December 1989
- Preceded by: New seat
- Succeeded by: David Watson

Member of the Queensland Legislative Assembly for Mount Coot-tha
- In office 1 June 1963 – 1 November 1986
- Preceded by: Kenneth Morris
- Succeeded by: Lyle Schuntner

Personal details
- Born: William Daniel Lickiss; 31 July 1924 Sydney, New South Wales, Australia
- Died: 22 February 1993 (aged 68) Brisbane, Queensland, Australia
- Party: Liberal Party
- Spouse: Elma Gwen Campbell (m.1948)
- Education: University of Queensland
- Occupation: Valuer, Sugarcane farmer, Pineapple farmer, Survey draftsman

William Daniel Lickiss QGM (31 July 1924 – 22 February 1993) was an Australian politician.

== Early life ==
He was born in Sydney to William George Lickiss and Lillian Rita, née Green. He attended Clempton Park Public School and Canterbury Boys High School before the family moved to Brisbane. He studied at the University of Queensland and became a draftsman with the Queensland Survey Office and then the Department of Territories in Darwin. During World War II he served in the Royal Australian Air Force as a navigator and intelligence officer. Returning to Queensland, he farmed sugarcane and pineapples and joined the Liberal Party.

== Political career ==
In 1963 he was elected to the Queensland Legislative Assembly as the member for Mount Coot-tha.

On 10 March 1975, he was appointed to the Cabinet as Minister for Survey, Valuation, Urban and Regional Affairs, with a further promotion to Attorney-General and Minister for Justice on 13 August 1976. He lost his Cabinet position in 1980 but became Deputy Leader of the Liberal Party in 1983, serving until 1986. In that year, after a redistribution split the seat of Mount Coot-tha, he became the first member for Moggill. He retired from politics in 1989.

== Personal life ==
On 3 October 1975, he was awarded the Queen's Gallantry Medal for his efforts to rescue a soldier during the flooding in Brisbane the previous year.

As at 1977, he was a Fellow of the Commonwealth Institute of Valuers, Australian Institute of Cartographers and the Royal Australian Planning Institute.

Lickiss died in Brisbane in 1993.

Parliament of Queensland
Preceded by Kenneth Morris	Member for Mount Coot-tha; 1963–1986	Succeeded by Lyle Schuntner
New seat	Member for Moggill; 1986–1989	Succeeded by David Watson
