= Electoral district of Lytton =

State electoral district of Queensland, Australia

Lytton Queensland—Legislative Assembly
- Electoral map of Lytton 2017
- State: Queensland
- MP: Joan Pease
- Party: Labor Party
- Namesake: Lytton
- Electors: 37,369 (2020)
- Area: 65 km^{2} (25.1 sq mi)
- Demographic: Inner-metropolitan
- Coordinates: 27°24′S 153°11′E
Electorates around Lytton:
Clayfield	Moreton Bay	Moreton Bay
Clayfield	Lytton	Moreton Bay
Bulimba	Chatsworth	Capalaba

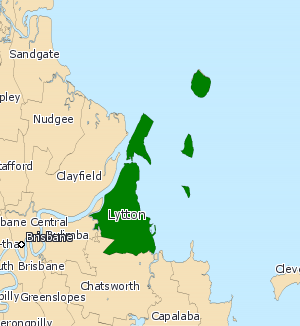
Electoral map of Lytton 2008

Lytton is an electoral district of the Legislative Assembly in the Australian state of Queensland.

The district is based in the eastern suburbs of Brisbane, to the south of the Brisbane River. It is named for the suburb of Lytton and also includes the suburbs of Hemmant, Lota, Manly and Wynnum, as well as the Port of Brisbane. The electorate was first created for the 1972 election.

Lytton is normally a safe Labor Party seat, although it was won in 2012 by the Liberal National Party.

== Members for Lytton ==
Member	Party	Term
Tom Burns	Labor	1972–1996
Paul Lucas	Labor	1996–2012
Neil Symes	Liberal National	2012–2015
Joan Pease	Labor	2015–present

== Election results ==
2024 Queensland state election: Lytton
Party	Candidate	Votes	%	±%
Labor	Joan Pease	14,003	40.19	−12.02
Liberal National	Chad Gardiner	13,146	37.73	+7.28
Greens	Jade Whitla	3,932	11.28	+0.73
One Nation	David White	1,926	5.53	+1.59
Independent	Craig Moore	1,158	3.32	+3.32
Family First	James (Jim) Vote	681	1.95	+1.95
Total formal votes		34,846	96.77	−0.68
Informal votes		1,164	3.23	+0.68
Turnout		36,010	90.85	+1.09
Two-party-preferred result
Labor	Joan Pease	18,470	53.00	−10.35
Liberal National	Chad Gardiner	16,376	47.00	+10.35
Labor hold		Swing	−10.35	

Primary vote results in Lytton (Parties that have never gotten 5% of the vote are omitted)
Labor
Liberal National

Liberal
National

Greens
One Nation
Australian Democrats
Katter's Australian
Queensland Labor
Independent
View source data.
Two-candidate-preferred vote results in Lytton View source data.
