= Joan Pease =

Australian politician

Joan Pease MP

Member of the Queensland Legislative Assembly for Lytton
- Incumbent
- Assumed office 31 January 2015
- Preceded by: Neil Symes

Personal details
- Born: 15 September 1961 (age 64) Brisbane, Queensland
- Party: Labor
- Occupation: Adult education teacher
- Website: www.joanpease.com

Joan Ellen Pease (born 15 September 1961) is an Australian politician. She has been the Labor member for Lytton in the Legislative Assembly of Queensland since 2015. Her previous work included providing training programs for the long term unemployed and running a small business.

Parliament of Queensland
Preceded by Neil Symes	Member for Lytton; 2015–present	Incumbent
