= Wendy Edmond =

Australian politician

The Hon Wendy Edmond

Member of the Queensland Legislative Assembly for Mount Coot-tha
- In office 2 December 1989 – 7 February 2004
- Preceded by: Lyle Schuntner
- Succeeded by: Andrew Fraser

Personal details
- Born: Wendy Marjorie Wood; 27 April 1946 (age 80) Bundaberg, Queensland, Australia
- Party: Labor
- Spouse: David Edmond (m.1972)
- Education: University of Queensland
- Occupation: nuclear medicine Technologist

Wendy Marjorie Edmond, née Wood (born 27 April 1946) is a former Australian politician. Born in Bundaberg, she was a nuclear medicine technologist before entering politics. She was also a member of Amnesty International and the Wildlife Preservation Society, and had served as president of the Rainsworth Branch of the Labor Party. She married university lecturer David Edmond on 30 December 1972. In 1989, she was elected to the Legislative Assembly of Queensland for Mount Coot-tha. When Labor won government in 1998, she was appointed Minister for Health, and in 2001 was given additional responsibility for Women's Policy. Edmond retired from politics at the 2004 state election.

Parliament of Queensland
Preceded by Lyle Schuntner	Member for Mount Coot-tha; 1989–2004	Succeeded by Andrew Fraser
