= Neil Symes =

Australian politician (born 1988)

Member of the Queensland Parliament for Lytton
- In office 24 March 2012 – 31 January 2015
- Preceded by: Paul Lucas
- Succeeded by: Joan Pease

Personal details
- Born: 11 December 1988 (age 37)
- Party: Independent (2015–2016, 2022–present); One Nation (2016–2022); Liberal National (until 2015)

Neil Aaron Symes (born 11 December 1988) was an Australian politician who was the member of the Legislative Assembly of Queensland for Lytton from 2012 to 2015. He was the youngest member of the Queensland Parliament during his term.

== Early life ==
Symes was educated at the Anglican Church Grammar School. He graduated with a bachelor's degree in criminology and human services, majoring in child protection and family studies, from Griffith University in 2009.

For nine months in 2009 he worked as a community engagement officer at Acacia Ridge, including involvement in organising a multicultural festival. He then became an employee of Woolworths Garden City, as a 23-year-old working in the delicatessen section.

== Political career ==
At 23 years of age, and living with his parents outside the electorate bounds, Symes was the youngest candidate for the Liberal National Party at the 2012 Queensland state election. He was elected with 51.1% of the two-party-preferred vote, converting a safe Labor seat with a 12.2-point margin, into a marginal seat with a 1.64-point buffer. The seat had been in Labor hands without interruption for 40 years.

In March 2013, Symes created a furore by taking to Facebook to vent his frustrations over a rally that took place in November 2012, which saw the Member for Lytton allegedly being threatened by protesters. In an article posted in The Courier-Mail, Symes warned he would "get his mates on to you" if any such threats took place again.

Symes was defeated by Joan Pease in the 2015 Queensland state election on a swing of over 11 percent, enough to revert Lytton to its traditional status as a safe Labor seat.

Following the 2015 election, Symes resigned from the LNP, became a real estate agent, and on 3 October 2016 announced via his Instagram account that he had joined Pauline Hanson's One Nation party. He unsuccessfully contested the seat of Mansfield for One Nation at the 2017 state election. He again unsuccessfully contested the seat of Jordan for One Nation at the 2020 state election. As of mid-2022, he officially quit being a member of One Nation and stated he had no official ties to any political party in Australia.

== Post-political career ==
Since 2021, Symes has been coaching club level soccer with Football Queensland.

Parliament of Queensland
Preceded by Paul Lucas	Member for Lytton; 2012–2015	Succeeded by Joan Pease
