= Paul Lucas (politician) =

Australian politician (born 1962)

The Honourable Paul Lucas
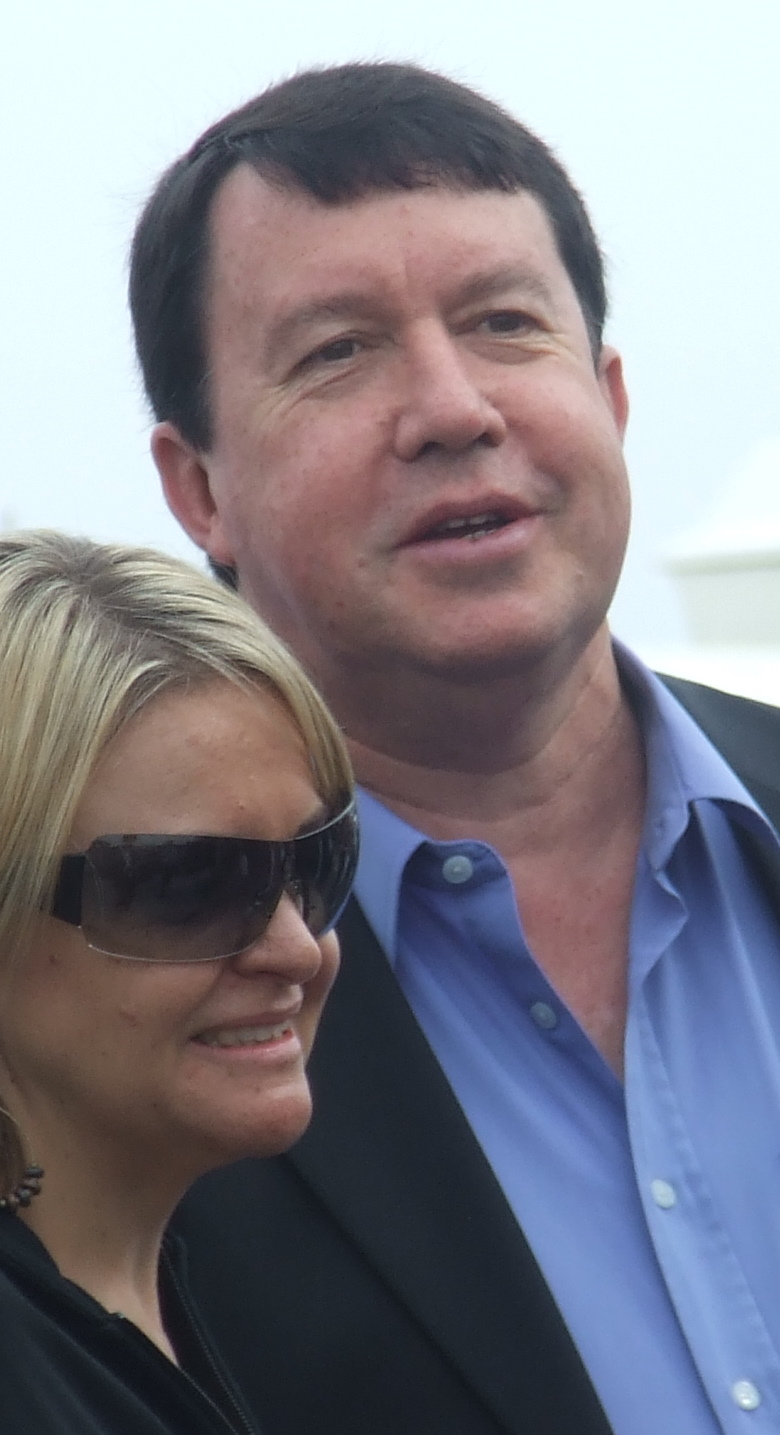

31st Deputy Premier of Queensland
- In office 13 September 2007 – 16 September 2011
- Premier: Anna Bligh
- Preceded by: Anna Bligh
- Succeeded by: Andrew Fraser

Attorney General of Queensland
- In office 21 February 2011 – 26 March 2012
- Premier: Anna Bligh
- Preceded by: Cameron Dick
- Succeeded by: Jarrod Bleijie

Minister for Local Government of Queensland
- In office 21 February 2011 – 26 March 2012
- Premier: Anna Bligh
- Preceded by: Andrew Fraser
- Succeeded by: David Crisafulli

Minister for Health of Queensland
- In office 26 March 2009 – 21 February 2011
- Premier: Anna Bligh
- Preceded by: Stephen Robertson
- Succeeded by: Geoff Wilson

Deputy Leader of the Labor Party in Queensland
- In office 13 September 2007 – 16 September 2011
- Leader: Anna Bligh
- Preceded by: Anna Bligh
- Succeeded by: Andrew Fraser

Minister for Transport and Main Roads of Queensland
- In office 12 February 2004 – 13 September 2007
- Premier: Peter Beattie
- Preceded by: Steve Bredhauer
- Succeeded by: John Mickel (Transport); Warren Pitt (Main Roads)

Member of the Queensland Legislative Assembly for Lytton
- In office 5 October 1996 – 24 March 2012
- Preceded by: Tom Burns
- Succeeded by: Neil Symes

Personal details
- Born: 9 July 1962 (age 64) Brisbane, Queensland, Australia
- Party: Labor
- Education: University of Queensland, University of Southern Queensland

Paul Thomas Lucas (born 9 July 1962) is an Australian former politician who served as the Attorney-General of Queensland and Minister for Local Government and Special Minister of State in the Bligh Government and the Member for Lytton from 1996 until his retirement at the 2012 state election. Lucas was a solicitor prior to entering Parliament, and has a bachelor's degrees in Economics and in Law and a Master of Business Administration.

== Political career ==
Lucas was elected to the Queensland Parliament in October 1996 at a by-election for the seat of Lytton, vacated by former Deputy Premier Tom Burns.

Lucas was previously the Deputy Premier and Minister for Infrastructure and Planning between September 2007 and March 2009. Lucas served as Minister for Transport and Main Roads between 2004 and 2007. Prior to that he was Minister for Innovation and Information Economy, with ministerial responsibility for Energy between 2001 and 2004.

Lucas was once under investigation for electoral malpractice in the Shepherdson Inquiry, but he was cleared of any wrongdoing.

While Lucas was Minister for Transport, he was issued a speeding ticket, which his driver paid for instead due to a mix-up. The incident attracted much negative attention from the media and the public.

There were calls for his resignation over the bungled rollout of a payroll system for Queensland Health workers in 2010. An online petition was started by the Queensland Public Sector Union as part of a campaign to force Lucas to resign after the Auditor-General released a report which heavily criticised the implementation of the new payroll system.

On 15 September 2011, Lucas announced he would step down as Deputy Premier the following day and would retire from the parliament at the next election.

== Community affiliations ==
Lucas belongs to many community organisations, including the Wynnum Manly Leagues Club, and is a patron of organisations such as Bay FM, Wynnum Softball Association, Eastern districts Orchid Society Inc and the Aid and Recreational Association for the Disabled and Wynnum Table Tennis. He was also a founding member of the Bayside Community Legal Service. He has played an important role in environmental issues, in particular fighting for a buffer zone between residential areas of Wynnum North and the Port of Brisbane. He has also worked to ensure that the Wynnum Manly community has benefited from the economic development of the Port and the Australia TradeCoast area.

== Personal life ==
On 20 January 2010, upon release from the Mater Private Hospital in Brisbane, Lucas admitted to having suffered an epileptic seizure but that he had returned to work and was "fighting fit", providing an example to the community that people with chronic medical conditions can participate fully in public life.

Political offices
Preceded by Anna Bligh	Deputy Premier of Queensland; 2007 – 2011	Succeeded by Andrew Fraser
Preceded by Cameron Dick	Attorney-General; 2011 – 2012	Succeeded by Jarrod Bleijie
Preceded by Desley Boyle	Minister for Local Government; 2011 – 2012	Succeeded by David Crisafulli
Preceded by Anna Bligh as Minister for Infrastructure	Minister for Infrastructure and Planning; 2007 – 2009	Succeeded by Stirling Hinchliffe
Preceded by Andrew Fraser as Minister for Planning	Minister for Infrastructure and Planning; 2007 – 2009	Succeeded by Stirling Hinchliffe
Preceded by Stephen Robertson	Minister for Health; 2009 – 2011	Succeeded by Geoff Wilson
Preceded by Steve Bredhauer	Minister for Transport and Main Roads; 2004 – 2007	Succeeded by John Mickel as Minister for Transport
Preceded by Steve Bredhauer	Minister for Transport and Main Roads; 2004 – 2007	Succeeded by Warren Pitt as Minister for Main Roads
Parliament of Queensland
Preceded by Tom Burns	Member for Lytton; 1996–2012	Succeeded by Neil Symes
