= Andrew Fraser (Queensland politician) =

Australian politician

The Honourable Andrew Fraser
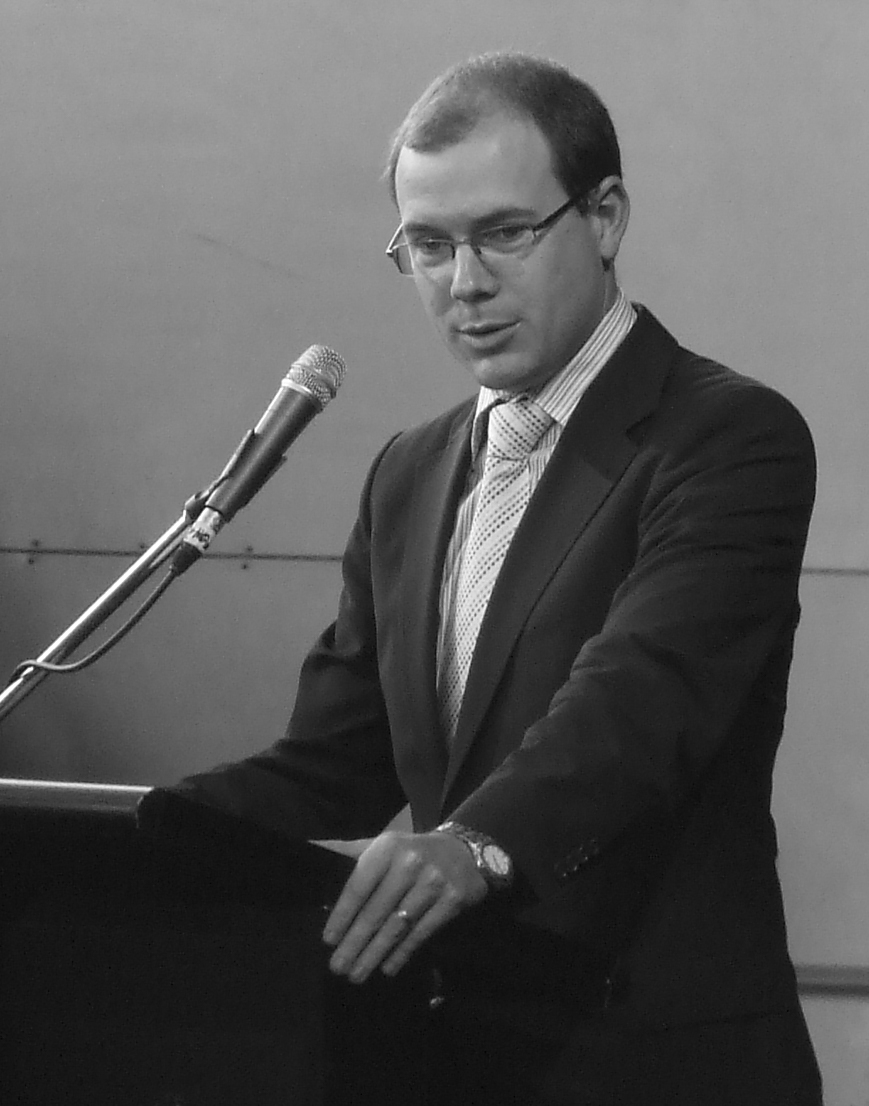

32nd Deputy Premier of Queensland
- In office 16 September 2011 – 26 March 2012
- Premier: Anna Bligh
- Preceded by: Paul Lucas
- Succeeded by: Jeff Seeney

47th Treasurer of Queensland
- In office 13 September 2007 – 26 March 2012
- Premier: Anna Bligh
- Preceded by: Anna Bligh
- Succeeded by: Tim Nicholls

Minister for State Development and Trade of Queensland
- In office 21 February 2011 – 26 March 2012
- Premier: Anna Bligh
- Preceded by: Stephen Robertson
- Succeeded by: Jeff Seeney (State Development); Tim Nicholls (Trade)

Minister for Local Government, Planning and Sport of Queensland
- In office 13 September 2006 – 13 September 2007
- Premier: Peter Beattie
- Succeeded by: Paul Lucas (Local Government)

Deputy Leader of the Labor Party in Queensland
- In office 16 September 2011 – 28 March 2012
- Leader: Anna Bligh
- Preceded by: Paul Lucas
- Succeeded by: Tim Mulherin

Member of the Queensland Parliament for Mount Coot-tha
- In office 7 February 2004 – 24 March 2012
- Preceded by: Wendy Edmond
- Succeeded by: Saxon Rice

Personal details
- Born: 15 September 1976 (age 50) Proserpine, Queensland, Australia
- Party: Labor
- Spouse: Therese
- Children: Angus and Eleanor
- Education: Griffith University

Andrew Peter Fraser (born 15 September 1976) is Chancellor of Griffith University, and was formerly an Australian Labor politician. He was first elected into the Legislative Assembly of Queensland on 7 February 2004. He was the Deputy Premier of Queensland, Treasurer and Minister for State Development and Trade of the Queensland Government. On 24 March 2012, Andrew Fraser lost his seat to the LNP candidate Saxon Rice.

== Early life ==
Growing up in Proserpine, Queensland, Fraser moved to Brisbane after winning a scholarship to Griffith University. He undertook a Bachelor of Laws and Bachelor of Commerce at Griffith, obtaining first class honours and was winner of the University Medal. As a student, Fraser lived predominantly in the Brisbane suburb of Paddington; he then moved to Bardon where he now lives with his wife Therese, and son and daughter, Angus and Eleanor.

== Political career ==
On 7 February 2004, Fraser was elected as the State Member for Mount Coot-tha and was subsequently re-elected in 2006. After the 2006 election, Fraser was appointed to the position of Local Government Minister, where he oversaw controversial council amalgamations in Queensland.

On 13 September 2007, Peter Beattie resigned as Premier of Queensland; that day, then Treasurer, Anna Bligh, was appointed as the new Premier, and Fraser was appointed Treasurer. At a subsequent media conference, Fraser stumbled by saying that he hoped to be a "future-focused Premier", but quickly corrected himself. Furthermore, on 26 March 2009, he was given an additional portfolio and appointed the Minister for Employment and Economic Development on top of already being State Treasurer.

On 21 February 2011, Premier Anna Bligh announced a machinery of government change and appointed Fraser as Treasurer and Minister for State Development and Trade.

Appointed at the age of 30, Fraser was the second-youngest Treasurer in the state's history. In 2011, Fraser became Deputy Premier of Queensland after the resignation of Paul Lucas from the position.

In the state election of 24 March 2012, Fraser lost his seat to the LNP candidate Saxon Rice.

Political offices
Preceded by Paul Lucas	Deputy Premier of Queensland; 2011 – 2012	Succeeded by Jeff Seeney
Preceded by Anna Bligh	Treasurer of Queensland; 2007 – 2012	Succeeded by Tim Nicholls
Preceded by Desley Boyle	Minister for Local Government and Planning; 2006 – 2007	Succeeded by Warren Pitt as Minister for Local Government
Preceded by Desley Boyle	Minister for Local Government and Planning; 2006 – 2007	Succeeded by Paul Lucas as Minister for Planning
Preceded by Terry Mackenroth	Minister for Sport; 2006 – 2007	Portfolio abolished
Parliament of Queensland
Preceded by Wendy Edmond	Member for Mount Coot-tha; 2004 – 2012	Succeeded by Saxon Rice
