= Anna Bligh =

Australian politician (born 1960)

The Honourable Anna Bligh AC
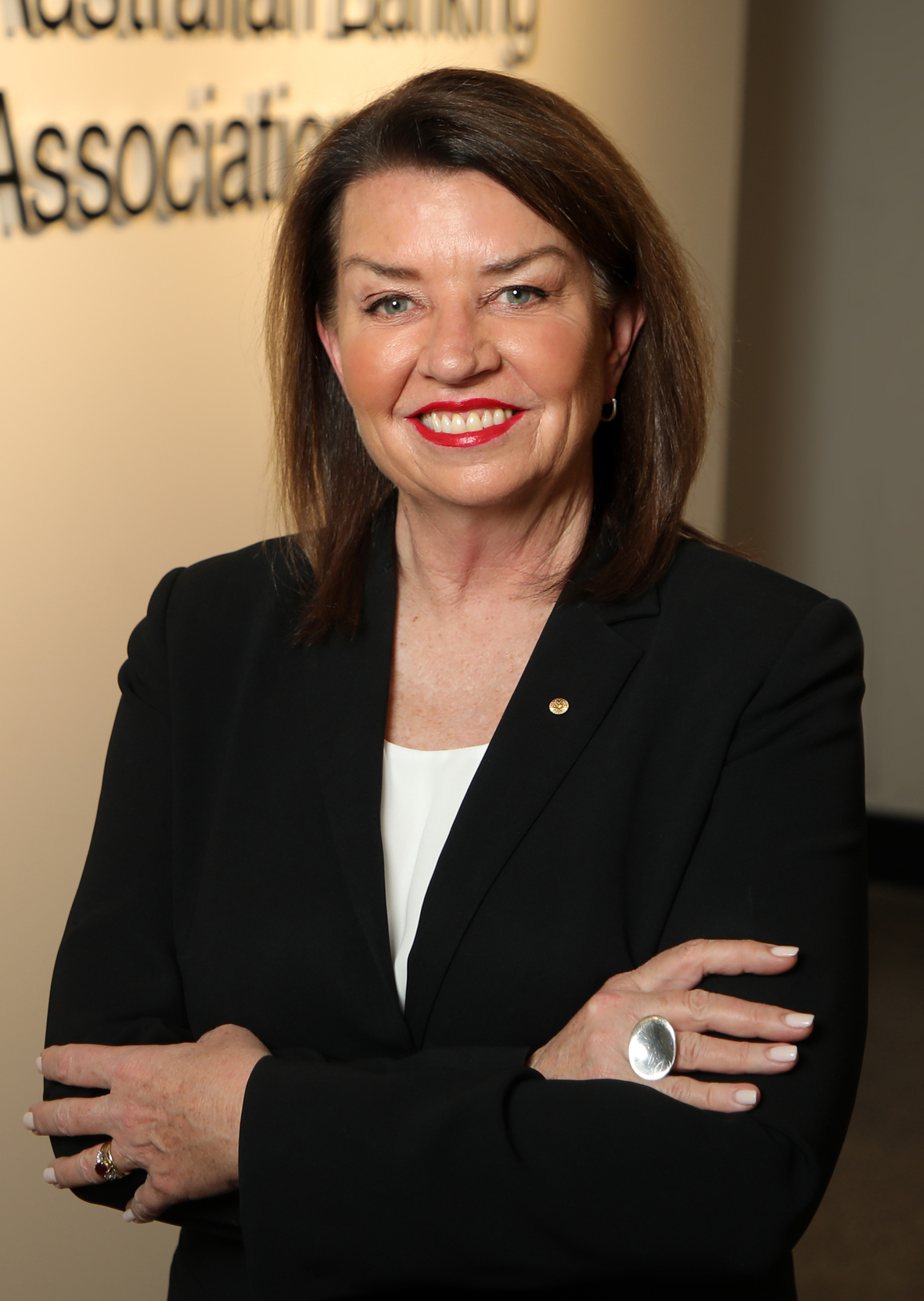
- Bligh in 2020

37th Premier of Queensland
- In office 13 September 2007 – 26 March 2012
- Monarch: Elizabeth II
- Governor: Quentin Bryce; Penelope Wensley
- Deputy: Paul Lucas (2007–2011); Andrew Fraser (2011–2012)
- Preceded by: Peter Beattie
- Succeeded by: Campbell Newman

Minister for Reconstruction of Queensland
- In office 21 February 2011 – 26 March 2012
- Premier: Herself
- Preceded by: New position
- Succeeded by: Jeff Seeney

Leader of the Labor Party in Queensland
- In office 13 September 2007 – 26 March 2012
- Deputy: Paul Lucas (2007–2011); Andrew Fraser (2011–2012)
- Preceded by: Peter Beattie
- Succeeded by: Annastacia Palaszczuk

46th Treasurer of Queensland
- In office 2 February 2006 – 13 September 2007
- Premier: Peter Beattie
- Preceded by: Peter Beattie
- Succeeded by: Andrew Fraser

30th Deputy Premier of Queensland Deputy Leader of the Labor Party in Queensland
- In office 28 July 2005 – 13 September 2007
- Premier: Peter Beattie
- Preceded by: Terry Mackenroth
- Succeeded by: Paul Lucas

Minister for the Arts of Queensland
- In office 12 February 2004 – 21 February 2011
- Premier: Peter Beattie (2004–2007); Herself (2007–2011)
- Preceded by: Matt Foley
- Succeeded by: Rachel Nolan

Minister for Education of Queensland
- In office 22 February 2001 – 28 July 2005
- Premier: Peter Beattie
- Preceded by: Dean Wells
- Succeeded by: Rod Welford

Minister for Families, Community Services, Disability Services and Youth of Queensland
- In office 29 June 1998 – 22 February 2001
- Premier: Peter Beattie
- Preceded by: Naomi Wilson

Member of the Queensland Parliament for South Brisbane
- In office 15 July 1995 – 30 March 2012
- Preceded by: Anne Warner
- Succeeded by: Jackie Trad

National President of the Labor Party
- In office August 2010 – 1 July 2011
- Preceded by: Michael Williamson
- Succeeded by: Jenny McAllister

Personal details
- Born: Anna Maria Bligh; 14 July 1960 (age 66) Warwick, Queensland, Australia
- Party: Labor Party
- Spouse(s): Greg Withers (1986–2015); Anthony Bertini (m. 2017)
- Children: 2
- Education: University of Queensland

Anna Maria Bligh (born 14 July 1960) is an Australian lobbyist and former politician who served as the 37th Premier of Queensland, in office from 2007 to 2012 as leader of the Queensland Labor Party. She was the first woman to hold either position. In 2017, she was appointed CEO of the Australian Banking Association.

Bligh was born in Warwick, Queensland, and studied at the University of Queensland. Before entering politics she worked for various community organisations. Bligh entered the Queensland Legislative Assembly at the 1995 state election, winning the seat of South Brisbane. She was promoted to the ministry in 1998, under Peter Beattie, and became deputy premier in 2005 and state treasurer in 2006. Bligh succeeded Beattie as premier in 2007 – Queensland's first female premier and Australia's third. She led Labor to victory at the 2009 state election, but at the 2012 election suffered a landslide defeat and announced her retirement from politics. From 2010 to 2011, Bligh was National President of the Australian Labor Party.

== Early life ==
Bligh was born in Warwick, Queensland. She is a descendant of William Bligh, who is famous for the Mutiny on the Bounty and being the 4th Governor of New South Wales. Bligh grew up on the Gold Coast. Her parents separated when she was 13. She attended Catholic schools until Year 9 and considered becoming a nun. One of her aunts became a nun and another had entered a convent. However, the church's attitude towards divorced people (her mother was no longer permitted to take Communion) reportedly estranged her and her mother from the church.

Studying at the University of Queensland from 1978, in 1981 Bligh gained a Bachelor of Arts. Bligh traces her politicisation to her first year at University, observing a right-to-march rally in King George Square where people were being hit over the head by the police. Bligh's first involvement in activism was student protests against the Vice-Chancellor Brian Wilson's controversial administrative restructuring within the university. She then went on to be involved in the Women's Rights Collective which campaigned for legalised abortion against the anti-abortion policies of the Bjelke-Petersen government. Bligh's next role was as Women's vice-president of the Student Union. She then ran an election ticket called EAT (Education Action Team) in an unsuccessful bid to oust the faction in charge, headed by the future Goss government identity David Barbagallo. Law student Paul Lucas, Bligh's future deputy premier, was a part of Barbagallo's team. Her 1982 team included the former Minister for Education, Training and the Arts Rod Welford. Anne Warner, who was a future Minister in the Goss Government, was an office holder at the time in the Union. Warner soon become one of Bligh's key political mentors.

She subsequently worked in a number of community organisations, including child care services, neighbourhood centres, women's refuges and trade unions as well as in the Queensland Public Service.

Bligh was the secretary of the Labor Party's Fairfield branch in 1987.

== Parliament ==
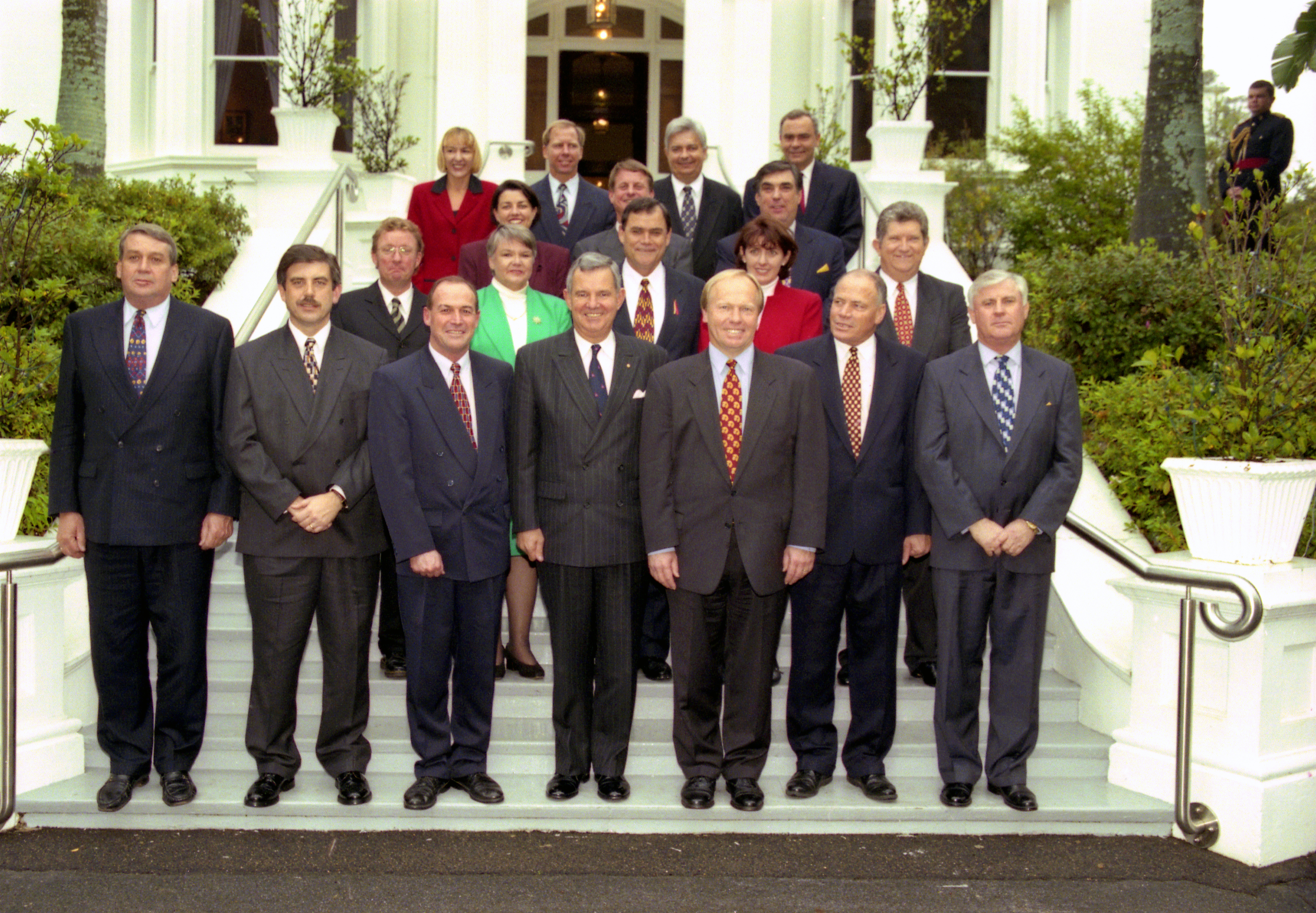
Bligh with members of the first Beattie Ministry in 1998

Bligh was first elected to parliament at the 1995 election to the safe Labor seat of South Brisbane, succeeding Anne Warner. A member of the Socialist Left faction of the Labor Party, she was promoted to the ministry following the election of the Beattie government in 1998 as Minister for Families, Youth and Community Care and Disability Services. In 2001, Bligh became Queensland's first female Education Minister. She assumed additional responsibility for the Arts portfolio in 2004.

=== Deputy Premier ===
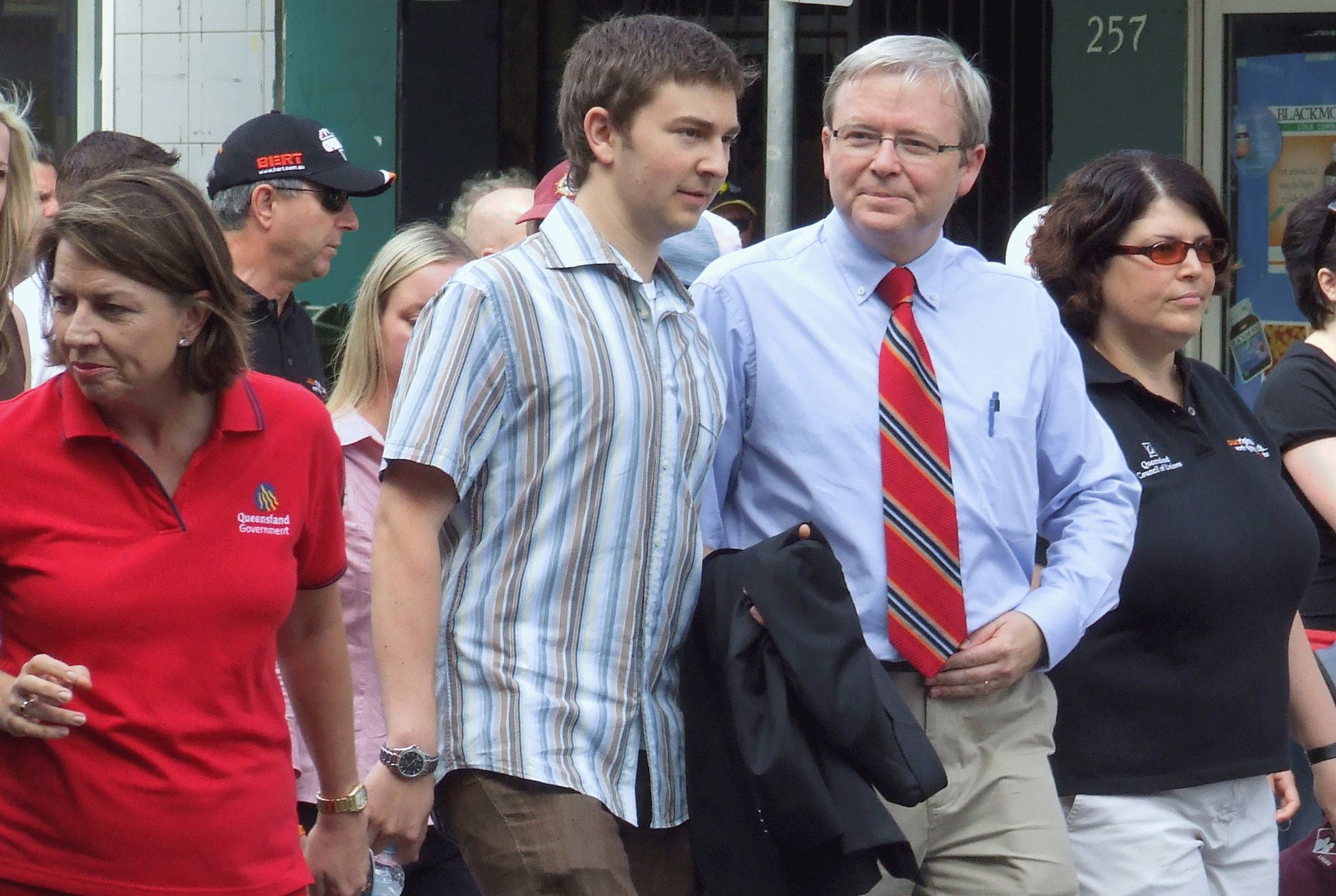
Anna Bligh, Nicholas Rudd, then federal Labor leader Kevin Rudd, and Grace Grace (state Labor MP for Brisbane Central) at Labour Day 2007

In July 2005, the retirement of the Deputy Premier and Treasurer Terry Mackenroth forced a cabinet reshuffle, which saw Bligh promoted to the office of Deputy Premier and Minister for Finance, State Development, Trade and Innovation. Bligh's appointment as Deputy Premier occurred ten years after her election to parliament.

== Premier ==
Bligh had long been touted as a likely successor to the long-running Premier Peter Beattie, and he publicly endorsed her as his replacement when he announced his retirement from politics on 10 September 2007.

She was subsequently nominated unopposed by the Labor caucus in a deal that saw Paul Lucas from the Right faction succeed her as Deputy Premier. She became the leader of the Labor Party on 12 September. After Beattie formally resigned on 13 September 2007, Bligh was sworn in by the then Governor Quentin Bryce. Bligh led Labor to victory in the 2009 state election. Bligh lost eight seats from the large majority she'd inherited from Beattie, and also suffered an eight-percent swing on the two-party vote. Nonetheless, due largely to taking 34 out of 40 seats in Brisbane, Labor still won 51 seats out of 89, enough for a comfortable majority. The election marked the Queensland ALP's eighth consecutive election win; the party had been in government for all but two years since 1989.

In winning the election, Bligh became Australia's first popularly elected female premier. The two previous female premiers, Carmen Lawrence (Western Australia 1990–93) and Joan Kirner (Victoria 1990–92), became premiers following the resignation of male premiers (as Bligh did), but both were defeated at the following respective state elections. However, Bligh is not Australia's first popularly elected female head of government. Rosemary Follett and Kate Carnell were both popularly elected as Chief Minister of the Australian Capital Territory, and Clare Martin was elected as Chief Minister of the Northern Territory.

In 2009, Bligh was elected to the three person presidential team of the Australian Labor Party, to serve until July 2012. She served as National President of the Australian Labor Party for the 2010–11 financial year.

=== Queensland floods ===
Bligh's leadership came to national attention in 2011 as she led the response and recovery effort to devastating natural disasters – a series of catastrophic floods across 78% of Queensland, including Brisbane – followed by a category 5 cyclone.

In an emotion-charged speech during a media conference at the height of the crisis, Bligh rallied the state, declaring, "We are Queenslanders. We're the people that they breed tough, north of the border."

Bligh led a major reconstruction program, including a legislated Reconstruction Authority administering a $6 billion rebuilding budget.

=== Economic reform ===
As Treasurer and Premier, Bligh held responsibility for a state budget of almost $50 billion. Her reforms include:

- Australia's largest infrastructure building program, averaging $15bn (AUD)/year, including new export chain capacity, major new roads and public transport infrastructure and a $9bn 'Water grid' connecting water storages and constructing new water sources, including a recycled water scheme and a desalination plant to drought proof Queensland's major urban populations.
- Major reform of utilities, including the amalgamation of water authorities into a framework structured into supply, distribution and retail corporations of government and the restructure of electricity supply to provide for private commercial retailers, including the sale of Queensland's electricity retailer.
- New investments into research, science and innovation – shifting a predominantly resource economy to a knowledge-based, creative economy - this 10-year program of investment saw the establishment of 36 new science research institutes and the ratio of scientists and researchers to population grow faster than any other state.
- Privatisation of the bulk freight and coal division of the government-owned railway business in 2010.
- Significant new investment in the Arts, including the construction of a new Gallery of Modern Art (GOMA) and other cultural infrastructure, which saw an increase in cultural tourism. These new investments included additional funding support for the performing arts and major exhibitions.
- Bligh led the successful bid for the Gold Coast to host the 2018 Commonwealth Games.

=== Privatisation ===
Bligh announced the privatisation of five government owned corporations:

- Queensland Motorways Limited (Operating the Gateway Bridge and Logan Motorway tolling systems)
- The Port of Brisbane Authority
- Forestry Plantations Queensland
- Abbot Point Coal Terminal
- Coal-carrying rail lines, currently owned by Queensland Rail (QR Passenger services will remain nationalised).

More than 3,000 workers were to be offered voluntary redundancies, just three months after the privatisation of QR National.

Queensland Motorways Limited and Forestry Plantations Queensland were not being sold, but rather being leased for an estimated 50-year lease. Since this announcement, the Queensland Government announced plans to sell Queensland Rail to the public.

Revenues from privatisation were estimated at $15 billion, to go towards balancing Queensland's state budget.

The sale of these assets aimed at removing significant overheads from the Queensland government's debt portfolio, allowing further growth of the government's capital assets, as well as aiding the government to return to its AAA credit rating. Bligh faced resistance from both within her party and the trade union movement, but defended her privatisation plan as 'not negotiable'.

=== 2012 election ===
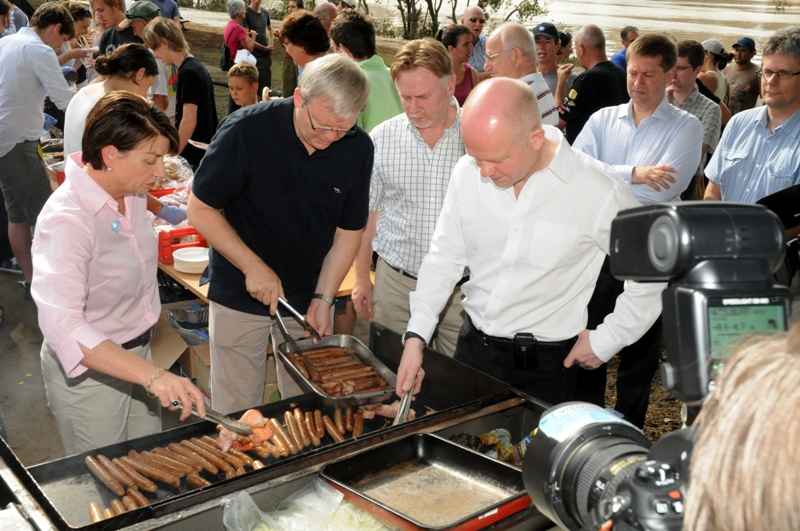
Bligh with Kevin Rudd and British Foreign Secretary William Hague at a 2011 barbecue to raise funds for Queensland flood victims.

Bligh's management of and performance during the 2010–11 Queensland floods was widely approved. Labor had been well behind the LNP, led by John-Paul Langbroek, for most of the time since the fall of 2010. However, the following Newspoll saw a record turnaround in Bligh and Labor's fortunes. Labor rose from a two-party deficit of 41–59 to a lead of 52–48, with Bligh's personal satisfaction-dissatisfaction standing going from a negative 24–67 to a positive 49–43. Bligh's recovery in the polls was a factor behind Langbroek being forced to stand down in favour of Brisbane Lord Mayor Campbell Newman. Newman had become a national figure during the floods, and polling showed he was the only non-Labor politician who even came close to matching Bligh's popularity during that time.

However, Newman was not a member of parliament, and a by-election could not be arranged to allow him to get a seat in the chamber. For this reason, Jeff Seeney was elected as interim parliamentary leader of the LNP while Newman led the LNP's election team and simultaneously contested the Labor-held seat of Ashgrove. Bligh harshly criticised Newman's move, saying it was irresponsible for Newman to "cut and run" from his post as Lord Mayor while Queensland was still rebuilding. She also hinted that she might call an election a year before it was due. She had previously promised not to call an election for 2011 to focus on recovery, but was concerned that the unorthodox leadership arrangement on the opposition side could make the co-operation necessary for the recovery effort impossible.

On 25 January, Bligh announced an election for 24 March. It was the first time in Queensland history that the voters knew the election date in advance of the parliament being dissolved. Bligh made this decision after learning that the Commission of Inquiry into the 2010–11 Queensland floods would not release its final report until 16 March, rather than the middle of February as originally planned. She wanted Queenslanders to see the report before they went to the polls.

Bligh asked Governor Penny Wensley to dissolve parliament on 19 February, formally beginning the 35-day campaign. She began the race as an underdog; the LNP had regained a substantial lead in polling since Newman took the leadership.

Bligh was dogged throughout the campaign by the perception that she'd misled voters about the asset sales. With Labor sinking in the polls, Bligh conceded in a 13 March interview with the Brisbane Times that in all likelihood, Labor would not be re-elected. The final Newspoll of the campaign appeared to confirm this, showing Labor's support had sunk to only 39.2 percent.

At 24 March election, Labor suffered one of the largest electoral wipeouts in Australian history, and the worst defeat that a sitting government in Queensland has ever suffered, double the previous record-holder of the 1989 election. Labor was reduced from 51 seats to seven, suffering a swing of more than 15 points. This was largely because of a near-total meltdown in Brisbane, which had been Labor's power base for over two decades. The party lost all but three of its seats in the capital, in some cases suffering swings of over 10 percent. Bligh herself suffered a 9-point swing in South Brisbane, and she only overcame her LNP challenger on Green preferences. Ten members of her cabinet were defeated. It was only the sixth time since 1915 that Queenslanders have thrown a government from office in an election.

The next day, with Labor's defeat beyond doubt, Bligh announced she was retiring from politics. She had intended to stay in parliament, but said that the severity of Labor's defeat made her realise the party could not "develop an effective opposition" with her even as a backbencher. She resigned as both premier and state Labor leader that day, and handed her resignation to Wensley the same afternoon, to take effect from 30 March 2012. Bligh had intended that the timing of her resignation would allow a by-election to be held on 28 April 2012, the same day as local government elections. She was ultimately succeeded as state Labor leader by her Transport Minister, Annastacia Palaszczuk.

Later reports suggested that Bligh would not be able to formally resign from Parliament until the writ of election for South Brisbane was returned, meaning that a by-election would be too late to coincide with the Brisbane City Council election. But on 2 April, she was declared the winner, and a writ was subsequently issued for the by-election.

== After politics ==
In 2014, Bligh was appointed CEO of YWCA New South Wales, a not-for-profit organisation striving to end domestic violence and build a safer world for women and children.

In 2017, she was made CEO of the Australian Banking Association. In August 2025, she retired from the role and was succeeded by former Liberal senator and finance minister Simon Birmingham.

In 2026, the National Australia Bank (NAB) announced that Bligh would be appointed to its board on 1 September pending regulatory approval.

== Personal life ==
On 8 June 2013, Bligh announced that she had been diagnosed with non-Hodgkin lymphoma.

Bligh's memoir, Through The Wall, was published in April 2015.

In 2017, Bligh was appointed a Companion of the Order of Australia for eminent service to the Parliament of Queensland, particularly as Premier, to infrastructure development and education reform, as an advocate for the role of women in public life, and to the not-for-profit sector.

== See also ==
- Bligh ministry
- List of female heads of government in Australia

Political offices
Preceded by Peter Beattie	Premier of Queensland; 2007–2012	Succeeded by Campbell Newman
Preceded by Terry Mackenroth	Deputy Premier of Queensland; 2005–2007	Succeeded by Paul Lucas
Preceded by Peter Beattie	Treasurer of Queensland; 2006–2007	Succeeded by Andrew Fraser
Preceded by Naomi Wilson	Minister for Families, Youth and Community Care; 1998–2001	Succeeded by Judy Spence
Preceded by Naomi Wilson	Minister for Disability Services; 1998–2001	Succeeded by Judy Spence
Preceded by Dean Wells	Minister for Education; 2001–2004	Succeeded by Rod Welford
Preceded by Herself as Minister of Education	Minister for Education and the Arts; 2004–2005	Succeeded by Rod Welford
Preceded by Matt Foley as Minister for the Arts	Minister for Education and the Arts; 2004–2005	Succeeded by Rod Welford
New office	Minister for Finance; 2005–2006	Position abolished
Preceded by Peter Beattie as Minister for Trade	Minister for State Development, Trade and Innovation; 2005–2006	Succeeded by Peter Beattie as Minister for Trade
Preceded by Tony McGrady as Minister for State Development and Innovation	Minister for State Development, Trade and Innovation; 2005–2006	Succeeded by John Mickel as Minister for State Development
Preceded by Tony McGrady as Minister for State Development and Innovation	Minister for State Development, Trade and Innovation; 2005–2006	Succeeded by Paul Lucas as Minister for Innovation
New office	Minister for Infrastructure; 2006–2007	Succeeded by Paul Lucas
Party political offices
Preceded by Peter Beattie	Leader of the Labor Party in Queensland; 2007–2012	Succeeded by Annastacia Palaszczuk
Preceded by Michael Williamson	National President of the Labor Party; 2010–2011	Succeeded by Jenny McAllister
Parliament of Queensland
Preceded by Anne Warner	Member for South Brisbane; 1995–2012	Succeeded by Jackie Trad
