= Results of the 2017 Queensland state election =

Queensland state election, 25 November 2017 Legislative Assembly << 2015–2020 >>
Enrolled voters	3,229,536				
Votes cast	2,826,613		Turnout	87.52	−2.37
Informal votes	122,672		Informal	4.34	+2.23
Summary of votes by party
Party	Primary votes	%	Swing	Seats	Change
Labor	957,890	35.43	–2.05	48	+4
Liberal National	911,019	33.69	–7.63	39	−3
One Nation	371,193	13.73	+12.81	1	+1
Greens	270,263	10.00	+1.57	1	+1
Katter's Australian	62,613	2.32	+0.39	3	+1
Consumer Rights	7,167	0.27	+0.27	0	±0
Independent	123,796	4.58	+0.95	1	±0
Total	2,703,941			93	

This is a list of electoral district results for the Queensland 2017 election.

Due to the redistribution of electoral boundaries for this election, swings are based on notional margins and percentages calculated by Antony Green of the Australian Broadcasting Corporation.

== Results by electoral district ==
=== Algester ===
2017 Queensland state election: Algester
Party	Candidate	Votes	%	±%
Labor	Leeanne Enoch	14,424	51.9	+0.3
Liberal National	Clinton Pattison	6,025	21.7	−15.1
One Nation	Darryl Lanyon	5,055	18.2	+18.2
Greens	Patsy O'Brien	2,277	8.2	+1.2
Total formal votes		27,781	94.8	−2.8
Informal votes		1,537	5.2	+2.8
Turnout		29,318	87.1	−1.2
Two-party-preferred result
Labor	Leeanne Enoch	17,898	64.4	+4.8
Liberal National	Clinton Pattison	9,883	35.6	−4.8
Labor hold		Swing	+4.8	

=== Aspley ===
2017 Queensland state election: Aspley
Party	Candidate	Votes	%	±%
Liberal National	Tracy Davis	12,757	39.7	−10.3
Labor	Bart Mellish	12,046	37.5	−1.8
One Nation	Shaun Byrne	3,081	9.6	+9.6
Greens	James Hansen	3,037	9.5	−0.1
Independent	Zachary King	494	1.5	+1.5
Consumer Rights	Neil Skilbeck	458	1.4	+1.4
Independent	Steve Ross	235	0.7	+0.7
Total formal votes		32,108	96.2	−2.1
Informal votes		1,278	3.8	+2.1
Turnout		33,386	90.5	−0.7
Two-party-preferred result
Labor	Bart Mellish	16,430	51.2	+4.3
Liberal National	Tracy Davis	15,678	48.8	−4.3
Labor gain from Liberal National		Swing	+4.3	

=== Bancroft ===
2017 Queensland state election: Bancroft
Party	Candidate	Votes	%	±%
Labor	Chris Whiting	12,252	43.0	−7.2
Liberal National	Kara Thomas	7,631	26.8	−10.7
One Nation	Chris Boulis	5,438	19.1	+19.1
Greens	Simone Dejun	1,772	6.2	−0.1
Independent	Barry Grant	1,425	5.0	+5.0
Total formal votes		28,518	95.7	−2.1
Informal votes		1,270	4.3	+2.1
Turnout		29,788	87.5	+6.4
Two-party-preferred result
Labor	Chris Whiting	16,029	56.2	−2.1
Liberal National	Kara Thomas	12,489	43.8	+2.1
Labor hold		Swing	−2.1	

=== Barron River ===
2017 Queensland state election: Barron River
Party	Candidate	Votes	%	±%
Labor	Craig Crawford	9,497	33.5	−6.0
Liberal National	Michael Trout	8,686	30.6	−10.4
One Nation	Andrew Schebella	4,760	16.8	+16.8
Greens	Cameron Boyd	3,551	12.5	+2.2
Independent	Cheryl Tonkin	1,039	3.7	+3.7
Independent	Andrew Hodgetts	826	2.9	+2.9
Total formal votes		28,359	95.4	−2.5
Informal votes		1,380	4.6	+2.5
Turnout		29,739	84.0	−3.0
Two-party-preferred result
Labor	Craig Crawford	14,707	51.9	−1.7
Liberal National	Michael Trout	13,652	48.1	+1.7
Labor hold		Swing	−1.7	

=== Bonney ===
2017 Queensland state election: Bonney
Party	Candidate	Votes	%	±%
Liberal National	Sam O'Connor	11,405	43.9	−0.1
Labor	Rowan Holzberger	9,279	35.7	+0.7
Greens	Amin Javanmard	2,540	9.8	+1.0
Independent	Robert Buegge	1,680	6.5	+6.5
Independent	Ron Nightingale	1,095	4.2	+4.2
Total formal votes		25,999	94.1	−3.1
Informal votes		1,633	5.9	+3.1
Turnout		27,632	83.2	−1.8
Two-party-preferred result
Liberal National	Sam O'Connor	13,023	52.2	−0.0
Labor	Rowan Holzberger	11,937	47.8	+0.0
Liberal National hold		Swing	−0.0	

=== Broadwater ===
2017 Queensland state election: Broadwater
Party	Candidate	Votes	%	±%
Liberal National	David Crisafulli	13,499	48.5	−8.5
Labor	Peter Flori	6,477	23.3	−1.5
One Nation	Brenden Ball	5,959	21.4	+18.6
Greens	Daniel Kwon	1,908	6.9	+1.1
Total formal votes		27,843	96.2	−1.6
Informal votes		1,100	3.8	+1.6
Turnout		28,943	86.4	+7.1
Two-party-preferred result
Liberal National	David Crisafulli	18,928	68.0	+1.7
Labor	Peter Flori	8,915	32.0	−1.7
Liberal National hold		Swing	+1.7	

=== Buderim ===
2017 Queensland state election: Buderim
Party	Candidate	Votes	%	±%
Liberal National	Brent Mickelberg	10,911	36.9	−15.3
One Nation	Steve Dickson	8,452	28.6	+28.6
Labor	Ken MacKenzie	6,638	22.4	−1.2
Greens	Tracy Burton	3,587	12.1	+1.2
Total formal votes		29,588	96.4	−1.5
Informal votes		1,091	3.6	+1.5
Turnout		30,679	88.1	+4.0
Two-party-preferred result
Liberal National	Brent Mickelberg	18,169	61.4	−0.4
Labor	Ken MacKenzie	11,419	38.6	+0.4
Liberal National hold		Swing	−0.4	

=== Bulimba ===
2017 Queensland state election: Bulimba
Party	Candidate	Votes	%	±%
Labor	Di Farmer	15,678	48.9	+1.1
Liberal National	Fiona Ward	11,080	34.5	−7.3
Greens	Felicity Jodell	4,211	13.1	+2.7
Independent	Bernadette Le Goullon	642	2.0	+2.0
Ind. People Decide	Angus Jell	471	1.5	+1.5
Total formal votes		32,082	96.6	−2.0
Informal votes		1,140	3.4	+2.0
Turnout		33,222	87.8	+1.8
Two-party-preferred result
Labor	Di Farmer	19,499	60.8	+4.7
Liberal National	Fiona Ward	12,583	39.2	−4.7
Labor hold		Swing	+4.7	

=== Bundaberg ===
2017 Queensland state election: Bundaberg
Party	Candidate	Votes	%	±%
Liberal National	David Batt	10,578	35.5	−6.9
Labor	Leanne Donaldson	10,232	34.4	−4.2
One Nation	Jane Truscott	6,681	22.4	+22.4
Greens	Marianne Buchanan	1,050	3.5	−0.6
Independent	Alan Corbett	681	2.3	+2.3
Independent	Richard Glass	313	1.1	+1.1
Independent	Richard Smith	248	0.8	+0.8
Total formal votes		29,783	95.3	−2.5
Informal votes		1,476	4.7	+2.5
Turnout		31,259	89.9	−0.7
Two-party-preferred result
Liberal National	David Batt	16,142	54.2	+4.7
Labor	Leanne Donaldson	13,641	45.8	−4.7
Liberal National gain from Labor		Swing	+4.7	

=== Bundamba ===
2017 Queensland state election: Bundamba
Party	Candidate	Votes	%	±%
Labor	Jo-Ann Miller	13,883	53.3	−11.8
Liberal National	Patrick Herbert	3,949	15.2	−5.1
Greens	Michelle Duncan	2,842	10.9	+3.0
Independent	Patricia Petersen	2,599	10.0	+10.0
Independent	Shan-Ju Lin	1,413	5.4	+5.4
Independent	Trevor Judd	1,338	5.1	+5.1
Total formal votes		26,024	91.8	−5.9
Informal votes		2,337	8.2	+5.9
Turnout		28,361	84.3	+3.3
Two-party-preferred result
Labor	Jo-Ann Miller	18,621	71.6	−4.3
Liberal National	Patrick Herbert	7,403	28.5	+4.3
Labor hold		Swing	−4.3	

=== Burdekin ===
2017 Queensland state election: Burdekin
Party	Candidate	Votes	%	±%
Labor	Michael Brunker	10,524	36.0	+4.6
Liberal National	Dale Last	9,274	31.7	−3.0
One Nation	Sam Cox	8,587	29.3	+26.0
Greens	Mathew Bing	880	3.0	+0.6
Total formal votes		29,265	96.7	−1.6
Informal votes		997	3.3	+1.6
Turnout		30,262	88.2	+1.1
Two-party-preferred result
Liberal National	Dale Last	14,866	50.8	+2.2
Labor	Michael Brunker	14,399	49.2	−2.2
Liberal National gain from Labor		Swing	+2.2	

=== Burleigh ===
2017 Queensland state election: Burleigh
Party	Candidate	Votes	%	±%
Liberal National	Michael Hart	13,717	49.7	+3.9
Labor	Gail Hislop	9,435	34.2	+3.2
Greens	Peter Burgoyne	4,434	16.1	+5.2
Total formal votes		27,586	94.4	−2.9
Informal votes		1,625	5.6	+2.9
Turnout		29,211	83.9	−1.8
Two-party-preferred result
Liberal National	Michael Hart	15,132	54.9	−0.6
Labor	Gail Hislop	12,454	45.2	+0.6
Liberal National hold		Swing	−0.6	

=== Burnett ===
2017 Queensland state election: Burnett
Party	Candidate	Votes	%	±%
Liberal National	Stephen Bennett	12,570	42.4	−4.1
One Nation	Ashley Lynch	7,907	26.7	+26.7
Labor	Lee Harvey	7,491	25.3	−4.4
Greens	Tim Roberts	1,646	5.6	+0.7
Total formal votes		29,614	96.1	−1.5
Informal votes		1,205	3.9	+1.5
Turnout		30,819	90.6	+1.4
Two-party-preferred result
Liberal National	Stephen Bennett	17,962	60.7	+4.1
Labor	Lee Harvey	11,652	39.4	−4.1
Liberal National hold		Swing	+4.1	

=== Cairns ===
2017 Queensland state election: Cairns
Party	Candidate	Votes	%	±%
Labor	Michael Healy	8,649	30.4	−14.0
Liberal National	Sam Marino	7,871	27.7	−9.7
Independent	Rob Pyne	5,440	19.2	+19.2
One Nation	Ian Hodge	4,157	14.6	+14.6
Greens	Aaron McDonald	2,290	8.1	+0.3
Total formal votes		28,407	95.9	−1.7
Informal votes		1,206	4.1	+1.7
Turnout		29,613	81.0	−0.4
Two-party-preferred result
Labor	Michael Healy	15,167	53.4	−4.1
Liberal National	Sam Marino	13,240	46.6	+4.1
Labor hold		Swing	−4.1	

=== Callide ===
2017 Queensland state election: Callide
Party	Candidate	Votes	%	±%
Liberal National	Colin Boyce	9,663	33.4	−11.5
One Nation	Sharon Lohse	7,408	25.6	+25.6
Labor	Darren Blackwood	6,404	22.2	−1.4
Katter's Australian	Robbie Radel	3,761	13.0	+13.0
Greens	Jaiben Baker	987	3.4	+0.5
Independent	Sandra Anderson	682	2.4	+2.4
Total formal votes		28,905	96.4	−1.8
Informal votes		1,089	3.6	+1.8
Turnout		29,994	89.4	−1.8
Notional two-party-preferred count
Liberal National	Colin Boyce		61.6	+1.8
Labor	Darren Blackwood		38.4	−1.8
Two-candidate-preferred result
Liberal National	Colin Boyce	16,220	56.1	−3.7
One Nation	Sharon Lohse	12,685	43.9	+43.9
Liberal National hold		Swing	−3.7	

=== Caloundra ===
2017 Queensland state election: Caloundra
Party	Candidate	Votes	%	±%
Liberal National	Mark McArdle	11,068	38.0	−6.7
Labor	Jason Hunt	8,348	28.7	+0.1
One Nation	Rod Jones	6,576	22.6	+22.6
Greens	Marcus Finch	3,098	10.6	+0.9
Total formal votes		29,090	95.9	−1.8
Informal votes		1,234	4.1	+1.8
Turnout		30,324	88.5	+3.4
Two-party-preferred result
Liberal National	Mark McArdle	15,536	53.4	−1.3
Labor	Jason Hunt	13,554	46.6	+1.3
Liberal National hold		Swing	−1.3	

=== Capalaba ===
2017 Queensland state election: Capalaba
Party	Candidate	Votes	%	±%
Labor	Don Brown	13,065	43.0	−4.4
Liberal National	Cameron Leafe	7,696	25.3	−14.8
One Nation	Paul Taylor	5,922	19.5	+19.5
Greens	Joshua Sanderson	2,563	8.4	−4.0
Independent	Jason Lavender	1,166	3.8	+3.8
Total formal votes		30,412	95.7	−1.7
Informal votes		1,360	4.3	+1.7
Turnout		31,772	88.5	−1.5
Two-party-preferred result
Labor	Don Brown	17,948	57.9	+1.4
Liberal National	Cameron Leafe	13,073	42.1	−1.4
Labor hold		Swing	+1.4	

=== Chatsworth ===
2017 Queensland state election: Chatsworth
Party	Candidate	Votes	%	±%
Liberal National	Steve Minnikin	14,993	49.8	+0.2
Labor	Paul Keene	11,442	38.0	−0.8
Greens	Dave Nelson	3,655	12.1	+3.6
Total formal votes		30,090	95.9	−2.4
Informal votes		1,280	4.1	+2.4
Turnout		31,370	90.1	+1.4
Two-party-preferred result
Liberal National	Steve Minnikin	15,918	52.9	−0.4
Labor	Paul Keene	14,172	47.1	+0.4
Liberal National hold		Swing	−0.4	

=== Clayfield ===
2017 Queensland state election: Clayfield
Party	Candidate	Votes	%	±%
Liberal National	Tim Nicholls	15,359	47.8	−4.8
Labor	Philip Anthony	10,559	32.9	+0.6
Greens	Claire Ogden	6,190	19.3	+7.3
Total formal votes		32,108	96.2	−2.2
Informal votes		1,256	3.8	+2.2
Turnout		33,364	86.8	+1.6
Two-party-preferred result
Liberal National	Tim Nicholls	16,829	52.4	−4.2
Labor	Philip Anthony	15,279	47.6	+4.2
Liberal National hold		Swing	−4.2	

=== Condamine ===
2017 Queensland state election: Condamine
Party	Candidate	Votes	%	±%
Liberal National	Pat Weir	13,554	41.8	−10.4
One Nation	Frank Ashman	7,709	23.8	+23.8
Labor	Brendon Huybregts	5,848	18.0	−2.7
Katter's Australian	John Hill	3,694	11.4	−4.0
Greens	Chris Turnbull	1,616	5.0	+1.1
Total formal votes		32,421	96.7	−1.4
Informal votes		1,117	3.3	+1.4
Turnout		33,538	91.8	+3.7
Notional two-party-preferred count
Liberal National	Pat Weir		64.1	−2.9
Labor	Brendon Huybregts		35.9	+2.9
Two-candidate-preferred result
Liberal National	Pat Weir	17,749	60.7	−6.4
One Nation	Frank Ashman	11,489	39.3	+39.3
Liberal National hold		Swing	−6.4	

=== Cook ===
2017 Queensland state election: Cook
Party	Candidate	Votes	%	±%
Labor	Cynthia Lui	10,105	40.1	−0.3
One Nation	Jen Sackley	4,639	18.4	+18.4
Liberal National	Penny Johnson	4,475	17.8	−15.9
Katter's Australian	Gordon Rasmussen	4,278	17.0	+4.5
Greens	Brynn Mathews	1,703	6.8	+1.4
Total formal votes		25,200	95.7	−2.3
Informal votes		1,124	4.3	+2.3
Turnout		26,324	81.3	+0.1
Notional two-party-preferred count
Labor	Cynthia Lui		58.2	+1.4
Liberal National	Penny Johnson		41.8	−1.4
Two-candidate-preferred result
Labor	Cynthia Lui	14,071	55.8	−1.0
One Nation	Jen Sackley	11,129	44.2	+44.2
Labor hold		Swing	−1.0	

=== Coomera ===
2017 Queensland state election: Coomera
Party	Candidate	Votes	%	±%
Liberal National	Michael Crandon	11,535	39.4	−7.8
Labor	Christopher Johnson	9,158	31.2	−1.1
One Nation	Ronald Pigdon	5,998	20.5	+20.5
Greens	Tayla Kerwin	2,620	8.9	+3.3
Total formal votes		29,311	94.2	−3.2
Informal votes		1,806	5.8	+3.2
Turnout		31,117	84.1	+6.4
Two-party-preferred result
Liberal National	Michael Crandon	15,673	53.5	−2.3
Labor	Christopher Johnson	13,638	46.5	+2.3
Liberal National hold		Swing	−2.3	

=== Cooper ===
2017 Queensland state election: Cooper
Party	Candidate	Votes	%	±%
Labor	Kate Jones	13,205	40.8	+1.7
Liberal National	Robert Shearman	11,510	35.6	−8.1
Greens	Reece Walters	6,666	20.6	+5.2
Independent	Robert Wiltshire	960	3.0	+3.0
Total formal votes		32,341	97.6	−1.3
Informal votes		809	2.4	+1.3
Turnout		33,150	90.0	−0.2
Two-party-preferred result
Labor	Kate Jones	19,614	60.6	+7.3
Liberal National	Robert Shearman	12,727	39.4	−7.3
Labor hold		Swing	+7.3	

=== Currumbin ===
2017 Queensland state election: Currumbin
Party	Candidate	Votes	%	±%
Liberal National	Jann Stuckey	13,215	47.7	+1.8
Labor	Georgi Leader	9,874	35.6	+5.9
Greens	David Wyatt	3,249	11.7	+0.4
Independent	Andrew Semple	1,375	5.0	+5.0
Total formal votes		27,713	95.3	−2.3
Informal votes		1,352	4.7	+2.3
Turnout		29,065	84.5	+1.6
Two-party-preferred result
Liberal National	Jann Stuckey	14,775	53.3	−2.4
Labor	Georgi Leader	12,938	46.7	+2.4
Liberal National hold		Swing	−2.4	

=== Everton ===
2017 Queensland state election: Everton
Party	Candidate	Votes	%	±%
Liberal National	Tim Mander	16,756	51.8	+2.2
Labor	David Greene	11,616	35.9	−4.2
Greens	Bridget Clinch	3,997	12.3	+2.4
Total formal votes		32,369	96.2	−2.1
Informal votes		1,273	3.8	+2.1
Turnout		33,642	91.3	+0.8
Two-party-preferred result
Liberal National	Tim Mander	17,784	54.9	+2.9
Labor	David Greene	14,585	45.1	−2.9
Liberal National hold		Swing	+2.9	

=== Ferny Grove ===
2017 Queensland state election: Ferny Grove
Party	Candidate	Votes	%	±%
Labor	Mark Furner	12,590	40.5	−3.0
Liberal National	Nick Elston	12,446	40.1	−0.9
Greens	Elizabeth World	4,820	15.5	+4.3
Ind. Animal Justice	Lisa Foo	1,208	3.9	+3.9
Total formal votes		31,064	96.9	−1.7
Informal votes		978	3.1	+1.7
Turnout		32,042	90.4	−1.0
Two-party-preferred result
Labor	Mark Furner	16,971	54.6	−0.7
Liberal National	Nick Elston	14,093	45.4	+0.7
Labor hold		Swing	−0.7	

=== Gaven ===
2017 Queensland state election: Gaven
Party	Candidate	Votes	%	±%
Liberal National	Sid Cramp	12,210	46.1	+6.4
Labor	Meaghan Scanlon	11,406	43.1	+14.5
Greens	Sally Spain	2,866	10.8	+4.7
Total formal votes		26,482	93.5	−3.4
Informal votes		1,848	6.5	+3.4
Turnout		28,330	86.4	−2.2
Two-party-preferred result
Labor	Meaghan Scanlon	13,430	50.7	+3.5
Liberal National	Sid Cramp	13,052	49.3	−3.5
Labor gain from Liberal National		Swing	+3.5	

=== Gladstone ===
2017 Queensland state election: Gladstone
Party	Candidate	Votes	%	±%
Labor	Glenn Butcher	17,307	64.3	+11.1
One Nation	Amy Lohse	5,497	20.4	+20.4
Liberal National	Chay Conaglen	3,113	11.6	−3.8
Greens	Peta Baker	998	3.7	−0.3
Total formal votes		26,915	96.7	−1.6
Informal votes		929	3.3	+1.6
Turnout		27,844	86.4	−3.8
Notional two-party-preferred count
Labor	Glenn Butcher		73.3	
Liberal National	Chay Conaglen		26.7	
Two-candidate-preferred result
Labor	Glenn Butcher	19,028	70.7	+7.7
One Nation	Amy Lohse	7,887	29.3	+29.3
Labor hold		Swing	+7.7	

=== Glass House ===
2017 Queensland state election: Glass House
Party	Candidate	Votes	%	±%
Liberal National	Andrew Powell	10,221	35.5	−8.1
Labor	Brent Hampstead	7,557	26.3	−5.2
One Nation	Tracey Bell-Henselin	6,525	22.7	+22.7
Greens	Sue Weber	3,705	12.9	−1.3
Ind. Workers	Sue Mureau	765	2.7	+2.7
Total formal votes		28,773	96.4	−1.5
Informal votes		1,068	3.6	+1.5
Turnout		29,841	89.4	+0.1
Two-party-preferred result
Liberal National	Andrew Powell	15,373	53.4	+2.5
Labor	Brent Hampstead	13,400	46.6	−2.5
Liberal National hold		Swing	+2.5	

=== Greenslopes ===
2017 Queensland state election: Greenslopes
Party	Candidate	Votes	%	±%
Labor	Joe Kelly	12,930	42.3	+0.0
Liberal National	Ian Kaye	11,110	36.4	−5.0
Greens	Victor Huml	6,498	21.3	+7.6
Total formal votes		30,538	96.5	−1.9
Informal votes		1,114	3.5	+1.9
Turnout		31,652	88.5	+1.7
Two-party-preferred result
Labor	Joe Kelly	18,364	60.1	+5.1
Liberal National	Ian Kaye	12,174	39.9	−5.1
Labor hold		Swing	+5.1	

=== Gregory ===
2017 Queensland state election: Gregory
Party	Candidate	Votes	%	±%
Liberal National	Lachlan Millar	9,556	45.3	−0.8
One Nation	Mark Higgins	5,113	24.2	+24.1
Labor	Dave Kerrigan	4,422	20.9	−5.3
Independent	Bruce Currie	1,376	6.5	+1.1
Greens	Norman Weston	645	3.1	+1.1
Total formal votes		21,112	96.8	−1.5
Informal votes		703	3.2	+1.5
Turnout		21,815	87.7	−7.0
Notional two-party-preferred count
Liberal National	Lachlan Millar		64.2	+3.1
Labor	Dave Kerrigan		35.8	−3.1
Two-candidate-preferred result
Liberal National	Lachlan Millar	13,499	63.9	+3.0
One Nation	Mark Higgins	7,613	36.1	+36.1
Liberal National hold		Swing	+3.0	

=== Gympie ===
2017 Queensland state election: Gympie
Party	Candidate	Votes	%	±%
Liberal National	Tony Perrett	11,829	37.2	−4.5
One Nation	Chelle Dobson	9,444	29.7	+29.0
Labor	Tracey McWilliam	7,109	22.4	−0.4
Greens	Roxanne Kennedy-Perriman	1,809	5.7	−0.1
Independent	Donna Reardon	1,574	5.0	+5.0
Total formal votes		31,765	95.8	−2.1
Informal votes		1,392	4.2	+2.1
Turnout		33,157	89.7	+2.5
Notional two-party-preferred count
Liberal National	Tony Perrett		58.7	+1.6
Labor	Tracy McWilliam		41.3	−1.6
Two-candidate-preferred result
Liberal National	Tony Perrett	18,640	58.7	+0.5
One Nation	Chelle Dobson	13,125	41.3	+41.3
Liberal National hold		Swing	+0.5	

=== Hervey Bay ===
2017 Queensland state election: Hervey Bay
Party	Candidate	Votes	%	±%
Liberal National	Ted Sorensen	12,049	37.7	−10.1
Labor	Adrian Tantari	9,282	29.1	−2.6
One Nation	Damian Huxham	8,059	25.2	+25.2
Greens	Jenni Cameron	1,619	5.1	+1.4
Independent	Jannean Dean	937	2.9	−0.9
Total formal votes		31,946	96.0	−1.7
Informal votes		1,345	4.0	+1.7
Turnout		33,291	88.5	+2.8
Two-party-preferred result
Liberal National	Ted Sorensen	18,880	59.1	+2.6
Labor	Adrian Tantari	13,066	40.9	−2.6
Liberal National hold		Swing	+2.6	

=== Hill ===
2017 Queensland state election: Hill
Party	Candidate	Votes	%	±%
Katter's Australian	Shane Knuth	15,065	48.2	+20.8
Liberal National	Mario Quagliata	7,136	22.8	−14.6
Labor	Diana O'Brien	5,923	18.9	−6.1
Greens	Johanna Kloot	2,052	6.6	+1.6
Independent	Stewart Worth	857	2.7	+2.7
Independent	Chester Tuxford	243	0.8	+0.8
Total formal votes		31,276	96.4	−1.8
Informal votes		1,153	3.6	+1.8
Turnout		32,429	87.9	−2.3
Two-candidate-preferred result
Katter's Australian	Shane Knuth	21,815	69.7	+14.9
Liberal National	Mario Quagliata	9,461	30.3	−14.9
Katter's Australian hold		Swing	+14.9	

=== Hinchinbrook ===
2017 Queensland state election: Hinchinbrook
Party	Candidate	Votes	%	±%
Liberal National	Andrew Cripps	8,523	30.1	−7.6
One Nation	Margaret Bell	6,232	22.0	+16.2
Katter's Australian	Nick Dametto	5,929	20.9	+8.1
Labor	Paul Jacob	5,384	19.0	−8.4
Ind. North Queensland	Peter Raffles	1,316	4.7	+4.7
Greens	Lyle Burness	917	3.2	+0.1
Total formal votes		28,301	95.9	−2.2
Informal votes		1,208	4.1	+2.2
Turnout		29,509	88.1	+3.5
Two-candidate-preferred result
Katter's Australian	Nick Dametto	16,288	57.6	+57.6
Liberal National	Andrew Cripps	12,013	42.5	−11.0
Katter's Australian gain from Liberal National		Swing	+11.0	

=== Inala ===
2017 Queensland state election: Inala
Party	Candidate	Votes	%	±%
Labor	Annastacia Palaszczuk	18,558	68.0	+3.7
Liberal National	Leanne McFarlane	5,651	20.7	−7.0
Greens	Nav Singh Sidhu	3,097	11.3	+3.9
Total formal votes		27,306	92.8	−5.1
Informal votes		2,105	7.2	+5.1
Turnout		29,411	86.6	+0.8
Two-party-preferred result
Labor	Annastacia Palaszczuk	20,778	76.1	+5.5
Liberal National	Leanne McFarlane	6,528	23.9	−5.5
Labor hold		Swing	+5.5	

=== Ipswich ===
2017 Queensland state election: Ipswich
Party	Candidate	Votes	%	±%
Labor	Jennifer Howard	12,815	48.0	−4.5
One Nation	Malcolm Roberts	7,106	26.6	+25.8
Liberal National	Andrew Caswell	3,712	13.9	−14.4
Greens	Brett Morrissey	2,319	8.7	+0.9
Independent	Troy Aggett	757	2.8	+2.8
Total formal votes		26,709	94.8	−3.2
Informal votes		1,473	5.2	+3.2
Turnout		28,182	88.7	+0.9
Notional two-party-preferred count
Labor	Jennifer Howard		64.3	−1.6
Liberal National	Andrew Caswell		35.7	+1.6
Two-candidate-preferred result
Labor	Jennifer Howard	16,262	60.9	−5.1
One Nation	Malcolm Roberts	10,447	39.1	+39.1
Labor hold		Swing	−5.1	

=== Ipswich West ===
2017 Queensland state election: Ipswich West
Party	Candidate	Votes	%	±%
Labor	Jim Madden	13,560	47.3	−0.1
One Nation	Brad Trussell	8,078	28.2	+19.8
Liberal National	Anna O'Neill	4,746	16.5	−18.1
Greens	Keith Muller	2,303	8.0	+2.0
Total formal votes		28,687	95.3	−2.7
Informal votes		1,427	4.7	+2.7
Turnout		30,114	88.8	+2.9
Notional two-party-preferred count
Labor	Jim Madden		61.6	+0.4
Liberal National	Anna O'Neill		38.4	−0.4
Two-candidate-preferred result
Labor	Jim Madden	16,844	58.7	−0.4
One Nation	Brad Trussell	11,843	41.3	+41.3
Labor hold		Swing	−0.4	

=== Jordan ===
2017 Queensland state election: Jordan
Party	Candidate	Votes	%	±%
Labor	Charis Mullen	11,026	39.6	−12.8
One Nation	Michael Pucci	5,255	18.9	+15.8
Liberal National	Duncan Murray	4,012	14.4	−17.3
Independent	Phil Cutcliffe	2,682	9.6	+9.6
Independent	Steve Hodgson	2,293	8.2	+8.2
Greens	Steven Purcell	2,068	7.4	−0.6
Consumer Rights	Peter Ervik	489	1.8	+1.8
Total formal votes		27,825	93.7	−4.0
Informal votes		1,858	6.3	+4.0
Turnout		29,683	89.0	+2.4
Notional two-party-preferred count
Labor	Charis Mullen		60.0	−3.5
Liberal National	Duncan Murray		40.0	+3.5
Two-candidate-preferred result
Labor	Charis Mullen	16,669	59.9	−3.6
One Nation	Michael Pucci	11,156	40.1	+40.1
Labor hold		Swing	−3.6	

=== Kawana ===
2017 Queensland state election: Kawana
Party	Candidate	Votes	%	±%
Liberal National	Jarrod Bleijie	16,268	55.9	+5.3
Labor	Mark Moss	7,415	25.5	−1.1
Greens	Annette Spendlove	3,058	10.5	+1.6
Ind. Whig	Mike Jessop	1,472	5.1	+2.3
Independent	Jeremy Davey	887	3.0	+3.0
Total formal votes		29,100	95.1	−2.5
Informal votes		1,499	4.9	+2.5
Turnout		30,599	87.8	+1.6
Two-party-preferred result
Liberal National	Jarrod Bleijie	18,354	63.1	+2.9
Labor	Mark Moss	10,746	36.9	−2.9
Liberal National hold		Swing	+2.9	

=== Keppel ===
2017 Queensland state election: Keppel
Party	Candidate	Votes	%	±%
Labor	Brittany Lauga	13,304	43.1	−0.8
One Nation	Matt Loth	7,865	25.5	+25.5
Liberal National	Peter Blundell	7,691	24.9	−15.0
Greens	Clancy Mullbrick	2,039	6.6	+1.8
Total formal votes		30,899	96.6	−1.7
Informal votes		1,098	3.4	+1.7
Turnout		31,997	90.6	+2.5
Notional two-party-preferred count
Labor	Brittany Lauga		55.7	+1.6
Liberal National	Peter Blundell		44.3	−1.6
Two-candidate-preferred result
Labor	Brittany Lauga	16,419	53.1	−1.0
One Nation	Matt Loth	14,480	46.9	+46.9
Labor hold		Swing	−1.0	

=== Kurwongbah ===
2017 Queensland state election: Kurwongbah
Party	Candidate	Votes	%	±%
Labor	Shane King	12,255	41.4	−6.0
Liberal National	Allan Cook	7,247	24.5	−14.4
One Nation	Karen Haddock	6,452	21.8	+21.8
Greens	Rachel Doherty	2,519	8.5	+0.6
Independent	Thor Prohaska	1,134	3.8	+3.8
Total formal votes		29,607	95.6	−2.1
Informal votes		1,374	4.4	+2.1
Turnout		30,981	89.1	−0.1
Two-party-preferred result
Labor	Shane King	16,874	57.0	−0.1
Liberal National	Allan Cook	12,733	43.0	+0.1
Labor hold		Swing	−0.1	

=== Lockyer ===
2017 Queensland state election: Lockyer
Party	Candidate	Votes	%	±%
Liberal National	Jim McDonald	10,377	35.8	+0.8
One Nation	Jim Savage	9,960	34.4	+8.5
Labor	Nicole Lincoln	6,635	22.9	−2.6
Greens	Ian Simons	1,317	4.5	+0.9
Independent	Tony Parr	683	2.4	+2.4
Total formal votes		28,972	96.1	−2.3
Informal votes		1,176	3.9	+2.3
Turnout		30,148	89.8	+1.6
Two-candidate-preferred result
Liberal National	Jim McDonald	15,666	54.1	+2.5
One Nation	Jim Savage	13,306	45.9	−2.5
Liberal National hold		Swing	+2.5	

=== Logan ===
2017 Queensland state election: Logan
Party	Candidate	Votes	%	±%
Labor	Linus Power	11,488	42.3	−2.8
One Nation	Scott Bannan	8,387	30.9	+29.1
Liberal National	Gloria Vicario	4,968	18.3	−19.3
Greens	Liam Jenkinson	1,327	4.9	−2.0
Ind. Animal Justice	Danielle Cox	616	2.3	+2.3
Independent	Daniel Murphy	360	1.3	+1.3
Total formal votes		27,146	94.3	−2.7
Informal votes		1,638	5.7	+2.7
Turnout		28,784	87.2	−2.7
Notional two-party-preferred count
Labor	Linus Power	15,426	56.8	+0.9
Liberal National	Gloria Vicario	11,720	43.2	−0.9
Two-candidate-preferred result
Labor	Linus Power	15,426	56.8	+0.9
One Nation	Scott Bannan	11,720	43.2	+43.2
Labor hold		Swing	+0.9	

=== Lytton ===
2017 Queensland state election: Lytton
Party	Candidate	Votes	%	±%
Labor	Joan Pease	15,416	48.9	−0.3
Liberal National	Karren Strahan	7,663	24.3	−11.9
One Nation	Suzanne Black	4,854	15.4	+15.4
Greens	Ken Austin	3,573	11.3	+2.4
Total formal votes		31,506	96.8	−1.4
Informal votes		1,057	3.2	+1.4
Turnout		32,563	89.9	+1.0
Two-party-preferred result
Labor	Joan Pease	19,541	62.0	+2.1
Liberal National	Karren Strahan	11,965	38.0	−2.1
Labor hold		Swing	+2.1	

=== Macalister ===
2017 Queensland state election: Macalister
Party	Candidate	Votes	%	±%
Labor	Melissa McMahon	10,210	36.7	−8.1
Liberal National	Judi van Manen	7,421	26.6	−10.9
Independent	Hetty Johnston	6,448	23.2	+23.2
Greens	Gabi Nehring	1,851	6.6	−1.0
Consumer Rights	Ben Musgrave	917	3.3	+3.3
Ind. Workers	Greg Bradley	522	1.9	+1.9
Ind. Animal Justice	Janelle Clancy	480	1.7	+1.7
Total formal votes		27,849	93.4	−3.8
Informal votes		1,973	6.6	+3.8
Turnout		29,822	85.5	+0.7
Two-party-preferred result
Labor	Melissa McMahon	15,999	57.4	+1.0
Liberal National	Judi van Manen	11,850	42.6	−1.0
Labor hold		Swing	+1.0	

=== Mackay ===
2017 Queensland state election: Mackay
Party	Candidate	Votes	%	±%
Labor	Julieanne Gilbert	13,281	42.9	−0.2
Liberal National	Nicole Batzloff	7,657	24.7	−4.0
One Nation	Jeff Keioskie	7,009	22.6	+22.6
Greens	Elliot Jennings	1,542	5.0	+0.2
Independent	Martin McCann	1,459	4.7	+4.7
Total formal votes		30,948	95.5	−2.1
Informal votes		1,445	4.5	+2.1
Turnout		32,393	86.9	−2.6
Two-party-preferred result
Labor	Julieanne Gilbert	18,054	58.3	−1.9
Liberal National	Nicole Batzloff	12,894	41.7	+1.9
Labor hold		Swing	−1.9	

=== Maiwar ===
2017 Queensland state election: Maiwar
Party	Candidate	Votes	%	±%
Liberal National	Scott Emerson	13,352	41.9	−5.8
Greens	Michael Berkman	8,850	27.8	+7.4
Labor	Ali King	8,772	27.5	−1.5
Ind. People Decide	Anita Diamond	888	2.8	+2.8
Total formal votes		31,862	97.6	−1.1
Informal votes		785	2.4	+1.1
Turnout		32,647	86.8	+1.1
Two-candidate-preferred result
Greens	Michael Berkman	16,449	51.6	+51.6
Liberal National	Scott Emerson	15,413	48.4	−4.6
Greens gain from Liberal National		Swing	+4.6	

=== Mansfield ===
2017 Queensland state election: Mansfield
Party	Candidate	Votes	%	±%
Liberal National	Ian Walker	11,610	40.2	−5.3
Labor	Corrine McMillan	11,375	39.4	−2.3
Greens	Barbara Bell	3,263	11.3	+1.8
One Nation	Neil Symes	2,631	9.1	+9.1
Total formal votes		28,879	95.9	−2.4
Informal votes		1,243	4.1	+2.4
Turnout		30,122	89.0	−2.2
Two-party-preferred result
Labor	Corrine McMillan	14,908	51.6	+0.8
Liberal National	Ian Walker	13,971	48.4	−0.8
Labor hold		Swing	+0.8	

=== Maroochydore ===
2017 Queensland state election: Maroochydore
Party	Candidate	Votes	%	±%
Liberal National	Fiona Simpson	12,661	44.7	−4.8
Labor	Julie McGlone	7,157	25.2	+1.2
One Nation	Cam Young	4,592	16.2	+16.2
Greens	Daniel Bryar	3,936	13.9	+1.4
Total formal votes		28,346	96.3	−1.6
Informal votes		1,101	3.7	+1.6
Turnout		29,447	85.7	+2.0
Two-party-preferred result
Liberal National	Fiona Simpson	16,587	58.5	−1.8
Labor	Julie McGlone	11,759	41.5	+1.8
Liberal National hold		Swing	−1.8	

=== Maryborough ===
2017 Queensland state election: Maryborough
Party	Candidate	Votes	%	±%
Labor	Bruce Saunders	14,208	45.2	+19.4
One Nation	James Hansen	9,546	30.4	+23.7
Liberal National	Richard Kingston	5,671	18.0	−13.7
Greens	Craig Armstrong	1,102	3.5	+1.1
Independent	Roger Currie	919	2.9	+2.9
Total formal votes		31,446	96.2	−1.8
Informal votes		1,237	3.8	+1.8
Turnout		32,683	90.5	+2.5
Notional two-party-preferred count
Labor	Bruce Saunders		58.4	+7.3
Liberal National	Richard Kingston		41.6	−7.3
Two-candidate-preferred result
Labor	Bruce Saunders	16,497	52.5	+1.4
One Nation	James Hansen	14,949	47.5	+47.5
Labor hold		Swing	+1.4	

=== McConnel ===
2017 Queensland state election: McConnel
Party	Candidate	Votes	%	±%
Liberal National	Jamie Forster	10,017	36.5	−5.5
Labor	Grace Grace	9,238	33.7	−2.5
Greens	Kirsten Lovejoy	7,436	27.1	+7.8
Independent	John Dobinson	283	1.0	+1.0
Independent	Edward Gilmour	242	0.9	+0.9
Ind. Socialist Alliance	Kamala Emanuel	217	0.8	+0.8
Total formal votes		27,433	96.1	−2.3
Informal votes		1,128	3.9	+2.3
Turnout		28,561	81.6	+3.8
Two-party-preferred result
Labor	Grace Grace	15,874	57.9	+4.8
Liberal National	Jamie Forster	11,559	42.1	−4.8
Labor hold		Swing	+4.8	

=== Mermaid Beach ===
2017 Queensland state election: Mermaid Beach
Party	Candidate	Votes	%	±%
Liberal National	Ray Stevens	12,232	45.5	−4.4
Labor	Joshua Blundell-Thornton	6,646	24.7	−2.7
Independent	Mona Hecke	3,162	11.8	+11.8
Greens	Helen Wainwright	2,599	9.7	+0.0
Independent	Saraya Beric	1,286	4.8	+4.8
Ind. Animal Justice	Ric Allport	541	2.0	+2.0
Independent	Gary Pead	391	1.5	+1.5
Total formal votes		26,857	93.4	−3.8
Informal votes		1,910	6.6	+3.8
Turnout		28,767	83.4	+2.1
Two-party-preferred result
Liberal National	Ray Stevens	15,110	56.3	−4.0
Labor	Joshua Blundell-Thornton	11,747	43.7	+4.0
Liberal National hold		Swing	−4.0	

=== Miller ===
2017 Queensland state election: Miller
Party	Candidate	Votes	%	±%
Labor	Mark Bailey	11,403	38.0	+0.9
Liberal National	Belinda Kippen	10,969	36.6	−2.7
Greens	Deniz Clarke	6,567	21.9	+4.9
Independent	Ted Starr	1,033	3.4	+3.4
Total formal votes		29,972	97.3	−1.2
Informal votes		816	2.7	+1.2
Turnout		30,788	89.1	−2.3
Two-party-preferred result
Labor	Mark Bailey	17,439	58.2	+2.6
Liberal National	Belinda Kippen	12,533	41.8	−2.6
Labor hold		Swing	+2.6	

=== Mirani ===
2017 Queensland state election: Mirani
Party	Candidate	Votes	%	±%
Labor	Jim Pearce	10,592	36.7	−4.3
One Nation	Stephen Andrew	9,234	32.0	+32.0
Liberal National	Kerry Latter	7,753	26.9	−11.4
Greens	Christine Carlisle	1,247	4.3	+0.2
Total formal votes		28,826	96.5	−1.4
Informal votes		1,033	3.5	+1.4
Turnout		29,859	91.1	−0.7
Two-candidate-preferred result
One Nation	Stephen Andrew	15,801	54.8	+54.8
Labor	Jim Pearce	13,025	45.2	−8.6
One Nation gain from Labor		Swing	+8.6	

=== Moggill ===
2017 Queensland state election: Moggill
Party	Candidate	Votes	%	±%
Liberal National	Christian Rowan	15,085	48.7	−1.4
Labor	Evan Jones	8,212	26.5	+1.2
Greens	Lawson McCane	6,479	20.9	+4.9
Consumer Rights	Amy Rayward	1,215	3.9	+3.9
Total formal votes		30,991	97.3	−1.2
Informal votes		873	2.7	+1.2
Turnout		31,864	91.3	+0.6
Two-party-preferred result
Liberal National	Christian Rowan	17,055	55.0	−3.1
Labor	Evan Jones	13,936	45.0	+3.1
Liberal National hold		Swing	−3.1	

=== Morayfield ===
2017 Queensland state election: Morayfield
Party	Candidate	Votes	%	±%
Labor	Mark Ryan	13,101	45.8	−4.9
One Nation	Rodney Hansen	7,223	25.2	+25.2
Liberal National	Jason Snow	5,744	20.1	−10.8
Greens	Gavin Behrens	1,727	6.0	+0.4
Independent	Jamie Janulewicz	837	2.9	+2.9
Total formal votes		28,632	95.5	−1.9
Informal votes		1,335	4.5	+1.9
Turnout		29,967	86.6	+4.1
Notional two-party-preferred count
Labor	Mark Ryan		59.3	−4.2
Liberal National	Jason Snow		40.7	+4.2
Two-candidate-preferred result
Labor	Mark Ryan	16,814	58.7	−4.8
One Nation	Rodney Hansen	11,818	41.3	+41.3
Labor hold		Swing	−4.8	

=== Mount Ommaney ===
2017 Queensland state election: Mount Ommaney
Party	Candidate	Votes	%	±%
Labor	Jess Pugh	13,215	42.7	+2.6
Liberal National	Tarnya Smith	11,270	36.4	−8.7
Greens	Jenny Mulkearns	4,211	13.6	+2.5
One Nation	Ian Eugarde	2,250	7.3	+7.3
Total formal votes		30,946	96.6	−1.5
Informal votes		1,088	3.4	+1.5
Turnout		32,034	90.7	−0.9
Two-party-preferred result
Labor	Jess Pugh	17,255	55.8	+4.8
Liberal National	Tarnya Smith	13,691	44.2	−4.8
Labor hold		Swing	+4.8	

=== Mudgeeraba ===
2017 Queensland state election: Mudgeeraba
Party	Candidate	Votes	%	±%
Liberal National	Ros Bates	13,695	46.1	−3.9
Labor	Paul Taylor	6,977	23.5	−4.5
One Nation	Andrew Liddell	5,288	17.8	+17.8
Greens	Rod Duncan	2,763	9.3	+1.4
Independent	Bill Sherwood	625	2.1	+0.3
Independent	Jill Pead	385	1.3	+1.3
Total formal votes		29,733	94.9	−2.4
Informal votes		1,605	5.1	+2.4
Turnout		31,338	86.4	+2.3
Two-party-preferred result
Liberal National	Ros Bates	17,795	59.8	−0.6
Labor	Paul Taylor	11,938	40.2	+0.6
Liberal National hold		Swing	−0.6	

=== Mulgrave ===
2017 Queensland state election: Mulgrave
Party	Candidate	Votes	%	±%
Labor	Curtis Pitt	13,256	48.1	−2.8
Liberal National	Karina Samperi	6,287	22.8	−8.6
One Nation	Sue Bertuch	6,158	22.3	+22.3
Greens	Carmel Murray	1,857	6.7	+2.7
Total formal votes		27,558	95.1	−2.6
Informal votes		1,416	4.9	+2.6
Turnout		28,974	84.7	−0.6
Two-party-preferred result
Labor	Curtis Pitt	16,789	60.9	−2.0
Liberal National	Karina Samperi	10,769	39.1	+2.0
Labor hold		Swing	−2.0	

=== Mundingburra ===
2017 Queensland state election: Mundingburra
Party	Candidate	Votes	%	±%
Labor	Coralee O'Rourke	8,768	31.4	−6.0
Liberal National	Matthew Derlagen	7,290	26.1	−14.5
One Nation	Mal Charlwood	4,652	16.7	+15.5
Katter's Australian	Mike Abraham	3,874	13.9	+10.8
Greens	Jenny Brown	2,130	7.6	+0.7
Independent	Dennis Easzon	468	1.7	+1.7
Independent	Alan Birrell	365	1.3	+1.3
Independent	Geoff Virgo	360	1.3	+1.3
Total formal votes		27,907	95.1	−2.6
Informal votes		1,423	4.9	+2.6
Turnout		29,330	86.8	−3.9
Two-party-preferred result
Labor	Coralee O'Rourke	14,268	51.1	−0.7
Liberal National	Matthew Derlagen	13,639	48.9	+0.7
Labor hold		Swing	−0.7	

=== Murrumba ===
2017 Queensland state election: Murrumba
Party	Candidate	Votes	%	±%
Labor	Steven Miles	14,111	45.7	−3.3
Liberal National	Reg Gulley	7,953	25.7	−14.8
One Nation	Scott Dare	6,002	19.4	+19.4
Greens	Jason Kennedy	2,841	9.2	+0.5
Total formal votes		30,907	95.6	−2.0
Informal votes		1,437	4.4	+2.0
Turnout		32,344	87.3	+2.4
Two-party-preferred result
Labor	Steven Miles	18,396	59.5	+3.2
Liberal National	Reg Gulley	12,511	40.5	−3.2
Labor hold		Swing	+3.2	

=== Nanango ===
2017 Queensland state election: Nanango
Party	Candidate	Votes	%	±%
Liberal National	Deb Frecklington	15,053	48.0	+1.6
One Nation	Douglas Grant	8,606	27.4	+27.4
Labor	Ben Rankin	6,044	19.3	−0.8
Greens	John Harbison	1,658	5.3	+1.6
Total formal votes		31,361	96.6	−1.6
Informal votes		1,091	3.4	+1.6
Turnout		32,452	89.6	−1.3
Notional two-party-preferred count
Liberal National	Deb Frecklington		65.9	+2.6
Labor	Ben Rankin		34.1	−2.6
Two-candidate-preferred result
Liberal National	Deb Frecklington	19,871	63.4	+0.1
One Nation	Douglas Grant	11,490	36.6	+36.6
Liberal National hold		Swing	+0.1	

=== Nicklin ===
2017 Queensland state election: Nicklin
Party	Candidate	Votes	%	±%
Liberal National	Marty Hunt	8,732	31.7	−1.4
Labor	Justin Raethel	6,931	25.2	+8.3
One Nation	Steven Ford	5,790	21.0	+21.0
Greens	Mick Tyrrell	3,413	12.4	+2.8
Consumer Rights	Jeffrey Hodges	1,003	3.6	+3.6
Independent	Tony R. Moore	972	3.5	+3.5
Ind. Animal Justice	Rachel Radic	705	2.6	+2.6
Total formal votes		27,546	95.6	−2.3
Informal votes		1,278	4.4	+2.3
Turnout		28,824	87.8	+0.3
Two-party-preferred result
Liberal National	Marty Hunt	15,227	55.3	+1.6
Labor	Justin Raethel	12,319	44.7	−1.6
Liberal National gain from Independent		Swing	+1.6	

=== Ninderry ===
2017 Queensland state election: Ninderry
Party	Candidate	Votes	%	±%
Liberal National	Dan Purdie	10,703	36.1	−7.3
Labor	Bill Gissane	6,744	22.8	+1.0
One Nation	Barry Ward	5,529	18.7	+18.7
Greens	Sue Etheridge	4,237	14.3	+0.6
Independent	Richard Bruinsma	1,479	5.0	+5.0
Ind. Animal Justice	Jamila Riley	944	3.2	+3.2
Total formal votes		29,636	95.0	−2.8
Informal votes		1,546	5.0	+2.8
Turnout		31,182	87.3	+3.3
Two-party-preferred result
Liberal National	Dan Purdie	17,301	58.4	+1.5
Labor	Bill Gissane	12,335	41.6	−1.5
Liberal National hold		Swing	+1.5	

=== Noosa ===
2017 Queensland state election: Noosa
Party	Candidate	Votes	%	±%
Independent	Sandy Bolton	9,479	31.4	+31.4
Liberal National	Glen Elmes	8,892	29.4	−16.5
Labor	Mark Denham	3,869	12.8	−8.5
One Nation	Eve-Marie Whiteside	3,551	11.8	+11.8
Greens	Phillip Jenkins	3,492	11.6	−10.2
Independent	Aaron White	610	2.0	+2.0
Ind. Reason	Robin Bristow	301	1.0	+1.0
Total formal votes		30,194	96.3	−1.5
Informal votes		1,171	3.7	+1.5
Turnout		31,365	87.7	+0.8
Two-candidate-preferred result
Independent	Sandy Bolton	18,578	61.5	+61.5
Liberal National	Glen Elmes	11,616	38.5	−18.1
Independent gain from Liberal National		Swing	+18.1	

=== Nudgee ===
2017 Queensland state election: Nudgee
Party	Candidate	Votes	%	±%
Labor	Leanne Linard	16,074	51.9	+4.0
Liberal National	Debbie Glaze	8,896	28.7	−7.1
Greens	Ell-Leigh Ackerman	4,130	13.3	+3.4
Independent	Anthony Simpson	1,899	6.1	+6.1
Total formal votes		30,999	96.0	−2.3
Informal votes		1,277	4.0	+2.3
Turnout		32,276	88.2	+1.3
Two-party-preferred result
Labor	Leanne Linard	19,940	64.3	+5.1
Liberal National	Debbie Glaze	11,059	35.7	−5.1
Labor hold		Swing	+5.1	

=== Oodgeroo ===
2017 Queensland state election: Oodgeroo
Party	Candidate	Votes	%	±%
Liberal National	Mark Robinson	14,549	52.4	+0.1
Labor	Tony Austin	9,389	33.8	−1.8
Greens	Brad Scott	3,812	13.7	+1.7
Total formal votes		27,750	95.6	−2.6
Informal votes		1,282	4.4	+2.6
Turnout		29,032	90.4	+0.5
Two-party-preferred result
Liberal National	Mark Robinson	15,883	57.2	+1.5
Labor	Tony Austin	11,867	42.8	−1.5
Liberal National hold		Swing	+1.5	

=== Pine Rivers ===
2017 Queensland state election: Pine Rivers
Party	Candidate	Votes	%	±%
Labor	Nikki Boyd	12,002	36.9	−6.6
Liberal National	Chris Thompson	8,727	26.9	−15.1
One Nation	Peter Warren	3,956	12.2	+12.2
Greens	Jack Margaritis	2,849	8.8	−1.1
Independent	Seath Holswich	2,545	7.8	+7.8
Independent	Michael Kosenko	2,055	6.3	+6.3
Consumer Rights	Greg French	355	1.1	+1.1
Total formal votes		32,489	96.1	−1.8
Informal votes		1,314	3.9	+1.8
Turnout		33,803	91.3	+1.6
Two-party-preferred result
Labor	Nikki Boyd	18,255	56.2	+2.1
Liberal National	Chris Thompson	14,234	43.8	−2.1
Labor hold		Swing	+2.1	

=== Pumicestone ===
2017 Queensland state election: Pumicestone
Party	Candidate	Votes	%	±%
Labor	Michael Hoogwaerts	10,506	35.6	−3.6
Liberal National	Simone Wilson	8,825	29.9	−14.6
One Nation	Greg Fahey	6,894	23.3	+23.3
Greens	Tony Longland	1,464	5.0	−0.6
Independent	Rick Williams	1,347	4.6	+4.6
Independent	Jason Burgess	499	1.7	+1.7
Total formal votes		29,535	95.8	−2.0
Informal votes		1,287	4.2	+2.0
Turnout		30,822	88.1	+2.6
Two-party-preferred result
Liberal National	Simone Wilson	15,015	50.8	+0.7
Labor	Michael Hoogwaerts	14,520	49.2	−0.7
Liberal National hold		Swing	+0.7	

=== Redcliffe ===
2017 Queensland state election: Redcliffe
Party	Candidate	Votes	%	±%
Labor	Yvette D'Ath	13,851	45.2	−2.0
Liberal National	Kerri-Anne Dooley	11,414	37.2	−0.5
Greens	James Bovill	2,446	8.0	+2.4
Independent	Ian Philp	1,087	3.5	+3.5
Independent	Graham Young	1,078	3.5	+3.5
Independent	Shayne Jarvis	770	2.5	+0.2
Total formal votes		30,646	95.3	−2.7
Informal votes		1,498	4.7	+2.7
Turnout		32,144	87.6	−0.6
Two-party-preferred result
Labor	Yvette D'Ath	16,811	54.9	−2.7
Liberal National	Kerri-Anne Dooley	13,835	45.1	+2.7
Labor hold		Swing	−2.7	

=== Redlands ===
2017 Queensland state election: Redlands
Party	Candidate	Votes	%	±%
Labor	Kim Richards	9,591	32.3	−3.3
Liberal National	Matt McEachan	9,435	31.8	−11.5
One Nation	Jason Quick	5,262	17.7	+17.7
Independent	Peter Dowling	2,889	9.7	+9.7
Greens	David Keogh	2,527	8.5	+0.8
Total formal votes		29,704	96.0	−1.7
Informal votes		1,243	4.0	+1.7
Turnout		30,947	89.4	+3.0
Two-party-preferred result
Labor	Kim Richards	15,760	53.1	+4.3
Liberal National	Matt McEachan	13,944	46.9	−4.3
Labor gain from Liberal National		Swing	+4.3	

=== Rockhampton ===
2017 Queensland state election: Rockhampton
Party	Candidate	Votes	%	±%
Labor	Barry O'Rourke	9,675	31.7	−21.2
Independent	Margaret Strelow	7,174	23.5	+23.5
One Nation	Wade Rothery	6,521	21.4	+21.4
Liberal National	Douglas Rodgers	5,442	17.9	−12.4
Greens	Kate Giamarelos	1,674	5.5	−0.7
Total formal votes		30,486	95.7	−1.6
Informal votes		1,362	4.3	+1.6
Turnout		31,848	89.0	−1.3
Notional two-party-preferred count
Labor	Barry O'Rourke		58.0	−6.0
Liberal National	Douglas Rodgers		42.0	+6.0
Two-candidate-preferred result
Labor	Barry O'Rourke	16,825	55.2	−8.8
One Nation	Wade Rothery	13,661	44.8	+44.8
Labor hold		Swing	−8.8	

=== Sandgate ===
2017 Queensland state election: Sandgate
Party	Candidate	Votes	%	±%
Labor	Stirling Hinchliffe	15,460	49.1	−0.6
Liberal National	Jessie Van Der Hoek	7,308	23.2	−13.5
One Nation	Matthew Stephen	4,703	15.0	+15.0
Greens	Miree Le Roy	3,985	12.7	+2.4
Total formal votes		31,456	96.5	−1.6
Informal votes		1,150	3.5	+1.6
Turnout		32,606	90.3	+1.3
Two-party-preferred result
Labor	Stirling Hinchliffe	19,969	63.5	+3.4
Liberal National	Jessie Van Der Hoek	11,487	36.5	−3.4
Labor hold		Swing	+3.4	

=== Scenic Rim ===
2017 Queensland state election: Scenic Rim
Party	Candidate	Votes	%	±%
Liberal National	Jon Krause	12,878	41.0	−7.5
One Nation	Rod Smith	8,662	27.6	+19.0
Labor	Carolyn Buchan	6,748	21.5	−5.7
Greens	Shannon Girard	3,109	9.9	+1.7
Total formal votes		31,397	96.1	−1.8
Informal votes		1,267	3.9	+1.8
Turnout		32,664	90.1	+7.0
Notional two-party-preferred count
Liberal National	Jon Krause		59.2	±0.0
Labor	Carolyn Buchan		40.8	±0.0
Two-candidate-preferred result
Liberal National	Jon Krause	19,819	63.1	+3.8
One Nation	Rod Smith	11,578	36.9	+36.9
Liberal National hold		Swing	+3.8	

=== South Brisbane ===
2017 Queensland state election: South Brisbane
Party	Candidate	Votes	%	±%
Labor	Jackie Trad	10,007	36.0	−6.0
Greens	Amy MacMahon	9,549	34.4	+11.7
Liberal National	Simon Quinn	6,764	24.3	−8.0
Sustainable Australia	Cameron Murray	516	1.9	+1.9
People Decide	Karel Boele	484	1.7	−1.2
Ind. Animal Justice	Karagh-Mae Kelly	249	0.9	+0.9
Independent	Frank Jordan	230	0.8	+0.8
Total formal votes		27,799	96.4	−2.0
Informal votes		1,052	3.6	+2.0
Turnout		28,851	83.7	+3.1
Two-candidate-preferred result
Labor	Jackie Trad	14,887	53.6	−10.2
Greens	Amy MacMahon	12,912	46.5	+46.5
Labor hold		Swing	−10.2	

=== Southern Downs ===
2017 Queensland state election: Southern Downs
Party	Candidate	Votes	%	±%
Liberal National	James Lister	12,797	41.2	−21.6
One Nation	Joshua Coyne	6,331	20.4	+20.4
Labor	Joel Richters	5,245	16.9	−6.6
Independent	Rob Mackenzie	5,042	16.2	+16.2
Greens	Antonia van Geuns	1,340	4.3	−2.9
Independent	Jay Nauss	300	1.0	+1.0
Total formal votes		31,055	96.3	−1.7
Informal votes		1,181	3.7	+1.7
Turnout		32,236	90.5	+0.1
Notional two-party-preferred count
Liberal National	James Lister		68.1	−1.1
Labor	Joel Ritchers		31.9	+1.1
Two-candidate-preferred result
Liberal National	James Lister	19,584	63.1	−6.1
One Nation	Joshua Coyne	11,471	36.9	+36.9
Liberal National hold		Swing	−6.1	

=== Southport ===
2017 Queensland state election: Southport
Party	Candidate	Votes	%	±%
Liberal National	Rob Molhoek	12,499	47.1	−2.5
Labor	Judy Searle	7,877	29.7	−1.9
Greens	Michelle Le Plastrier	2,806	10.6	+2.4
Independent	Rick Flori	2,597	9.8	+9.8
Consumer Rights	Johan Joubert	769	2.9	+2.9
Total formal votes		26,548	94.8	−2.6
Informal votes		1,458	5.2	+2.6
Turnout		28,006	82.4	+1.1
Two-party-preferred result
Liberal National	Rob Molhoek	15,197	57.2	−0.6
Labor	Judy Searle	11,351	42.8	+0.6
Liberal National hold		Swing	−0.6	

=== Springwood ===
2017 Queensland state election: Springwood
Party	Candidate	Votes	%	±%
Labor	Mick de Brenni	13,289	44.2	+3.8
Liberal National	Julie Talty	12,117	40.3	−2.1
Greens	Neil Cotter	2,721	9.0	+0.4
Consumer Rights	John Taylor	1,961	6.5	+6.5
Total formal votes		30,088	95.3	−2.8
Informal votes		1,490	4.7	+2.8
Turnout		31,578	89.4	+0.7
Two-party-preferred result
Labor	Mick de Brenni	16,125	53.6	+2.2
Liberal National	Julie Talty	13,963	46.4	−2.2
Labor hold		Swing	+2.2	

=== Stafford ===
2017 Queensland state election: Stafford
Party	Candidate	Votes	%	±%
Labor	Anthony Lynham	15,357	48.1	+0.4
Liberal National	Ed Sangjitphun	10,739	33.6	−3.9
Greens	John Meyer	5,835	18.3	+4.7
Total formal votes		31,931	96.1	−2.2
Informal votes		1,296	3.9	+2.2
Turnout		33,227	88.3	−1.6
Two-party-preferred result
Labor	Anthony Lynham	19,830	62.1	+2.8
Liberal National	Ed Sangjitphun	12,101	37.9	−2.8
Labor hold		Swing	+2.8	

=== Stretton ===
2017 Queensland state election: Stretton
Party	Candidate	Votes	%	±%
Labor	Duncan Pegg	14,061	50.6	+8.1
Liberal National	Freya Ostapovitch	7,884	28.4	−9.9
One Nation	Shane Holley	3,298	11.9	+11.9
Greens	Anisa Nandaula	2,059	7.4	+1.0
Independent	Shyamal Reddy	484	1.7	+1.7
Total formal votes		27,786	95.0	−2.9
Informal votes		1,454	5.0	+2.9
Turnout		29,240	87.2	−0.7
Two-party-preferred result
Labor	Duncan Pegg	16,640	59.9	+4.6
Liberal National	Freya Ostapovitch	11,146	40.1	−4.6
Labor hold		Swing	+4.6	

=== Surfers Paradise ===
2017 Queensland state election: Surfers Paradise
Party	Candidate	Votes	%	±%
Liberal National	John-Paul Langbroek	16,127	63.2	+1.2
Labor	Tony Walker	5,715	22.4	+1.3
Greens	Scott Turner	2,323	9.1	+1.5
Independent	Chris Manley	785	3.1	+3.1
Independent	Tylere Baker-Pearce	556	2.2	+2.2
Total formal votes		25,506	94.5	−3.3
Informal votes		1,497	5.5	+3.3
Turnout		27,003	81.0	−0.5
Two-party-preferred result
Liberal National	John-Paul Langbroek	17,799	69.8	−0.6
Labor	Tony Walker	7,707	30.2	+0.6
Liberal National hold		Swing	−0.6	

=== Theodore ===
2017 Queensland state election: Theodore
Party	Candidate	Votes	%	±%
Liberal National	Mark Boothman	10,678	39.7	−5.4
Labor	Luz Stanton	8,462	31.5	+0.3
One Nation	Darrell Lane	5,114	19.0	+19.0
Greens	Tina Meni	2,634	9.8	+3.8
Total formal votes		26,888	94.6	−2.4
Informal votes		1,525	5.4	+2.4
Turnout		28,413	85.5	+5.1
Two-party-preferred result
Liberal National	Mark Boothman	14,445	53.7	−1.6
Labor	Luz Stanton	12,443	46.3	+1.6
Liberal National hold		Swing	−1.6	

=== Thuringowa ===
2017 Queensland state election: Thuringowa
Party	Candidate	Votes	%	±%
Labor	Aaron Harper	9,394	32.2	−8.9
Liberal National	Nick Martinez	6,191	21.2	−13.0
One Nation	Mark Thornton	5,878	20.2	+14.3
Katter's Australian	Terry Fox	4,546	15.6	+15.6
Greens	Mike Rubenach	1,633	5.6	+1.3
Independent	Stephen Lane	1,527	5.2	+5.2
Total formal votes		29,169	94.9	−2.5
Informal votes		1,572	5.1	+2.5
Turnout		30,741	86.8	−1.0
Notional two-party-preferred count
Labor	Aaron Harper		51.1	−5.5
Liberal National	Nick Martinez		48.9	+5.5
Two-candidate-preferred result
Labor	Aaron Harper	15,795	54.1	−2.4
One Nation	Mark Thornton	13,374	45.9	+45.9
Labor hold		Swing	−2.4	

=== Toohey ===
2017 Queensland state election: Toohey
Party	Candidate	Votes	%	±%
Labor	Peter Russo	12,284	44.6	−1.3
Liberal National	Anthony Shorten	8,336	30.3	−7.1
Greens	Gordon King	4,026	14.6	+2.9
One Nation	Guansheng (Victor) Zhang	2,891	10.5	+10.5
Total formal votes		27,537	95.2	−2.7
Informal votes		1,398	4.8	+2.7
Turnout		28,935	86.1	−1.6
Two-party-preferred result
Labor	Peter Russo	16,526	60.0	+1.7
Liberal National	Anthony Shorten	11,011	40.0	−1.7
Labor hold		Swing	+1.7	

=== Toowoomba North ===
2017 Queensland state election: Toowoomba North
Party	Candidate	Votes	%	±%
Liberal National	Trevor Watts	13,128	42.2	−2.2
Labor	Kerry Shine	10,274	33.0	−5.8
One Nation	Paul Wilson	4,561	14.7	+14.7
Greens	Emmeline Chidley	2,033	6.5	+2.0
Independent	Josie Townsend	1,118	3.6	+3.6
Total formal votes		31,114	96.4	−1.7
Informal votes		1,166	3.6	+1.7
Turnout		32,280	88.2	−1.9
Two-party-preferred result
Liberal National	Trevor Watts	17,337	55.7	+4.1
Labor	Kerry Shine	13,777	44.3	−4.1
Liberal National hold		Swing	+4.1	

=== Toowoomba South ===
2017 Queensland state election: Toowoomba South
Party	Candidate	Votes	%	±%
Liberal National	David Janetzki	14,893	46.5	−8.1
Labor	Susan Krause	8,626	26.9	−7.9
One Nation	Jeremy Scamp	5,273	16.5	+16.5
Greens	Alyce Nelligan	2,308	7.2	−2.5
Independent	Rob Berry	923	2.9	+2.9
Total formal votes		32,023	96.3	−1.3
Informal votes		1,243	3.7	+1.3
Turnout		33,266	88.9	−1.8
Two-party-preferred result
Liberal National	David Janetzki	19,208	60.0	+1.6
Labor	Susan Krause	12,815	40.0	−1.6
Liberal National hold		Swing	+1.6	

=== Townsville ===
2017 Queensland state election: Townsville
Party	Candidate	Votes	%	±%
Labor	Scott Stewart	9,457	33.6	−6.5
Liberal National	Casie Scott	8,709	30.9	−5.1
One Nation	Allan Evans	5,611	19.9	+16.1
Greens	Rebecca Ryan	3,057	10.9	+2.5
Independent	Lindy Collins	1,330	4.7	+4.7
Total formal votes		28,164	96.1	−1.8
Informal votes		1,153	3.9	+1.8
Turnout		29,317	83.9	−1.8
Two-party-preferred result
Labor	Scott Stewart	14,189	50.4	−5.3
Liberal National	Casie Scott	13,975	49.6	+5.3
Labor hold		Swing	−5.3	

=== Traeger ===
2017 Queensland state election: Traeger
Party	Candidate	Votes	%	±%
Katter's Australian	Robbie Katter	13,638	66.2	+17.9
Labor	Danielle Slade	3,416	16.6	−1.7
Liberal National	Ron Bird	2,071	10.1	−18.5
Independent	Sarah Isaacs	683	3.3	+3.3
Greens	Peter Relph	443	2.2	+0.2
Independent	Craig Scriven	342	1.7	+1.7
Total formal votes		20,593	96.0	−2.3
Informal votes		847	4.0	+2.3
Turnout		21,440	82.0	−1.2
Two-candidate-preferred result
Katter's Australian	Robbie Katter	16,163	78.5	+12.4
Labor	Danielle Slade	4,430	21.5	+21.5
Katter's Australian hold		Swing	+12.4	

=== Warrego ===
2017 Queensland state election: Warrego
Party	Candidate	Votes	%	±%
Liberal National	Ann Leahy	11,949	47.6	−5.0
Labor	Mark O'Brien	5,441	21.7	−4.7
Katter's Australian	Rob Loughnan	5,329	21.2	+16.5
Independent	Mark Stone	863	3.4	+3.4
Greens	Ian Mazlin	775	3.1	+0.3
Independent	Sandra Bamberry	732	2.9	+2.9
Total formal votes		25,089	95.8	−2.1
Informal votes		1,100	4.2	+2.1
Turnout		26,189	88.4	−2.8
Notional two-party-preferred count
Liberal National	Ann Leahy		64.3	−0.3
Labor	Mark O'Brien		35.7	+0.3
Two-candidate-preferred result
Liberal National	Ann Leahy	14,917	59.5	−5.0
Katter's Australian	Rob Loughnan	10,172	40.5	+40.5
Liberal National hold		Swing	−5.0	

=== Waterford ===
2017 Queensland state election: Waterford
Party	Candidate	Votes	%	±%
Labor	Shannon Fentiman	12,501	47.7	−4.5
One Nation	Kim Miller	5,423	20.7	+20.7
Liberal National	Felicity Westguard	5,248	20.0	−11.6
Greens	Kirsty Petersen	1,918	7.3	−0.8
Independent	Lee McKenzie McKinnon	1,113	4.2	+4.2
Total formal votes		26,203	94.0	−3.0
Informal votes		1,681	6.0	+3.0
Turnout		27,884	84.4	+3.4
Notional two-party-preferred count
Labor	Shannon Fentiman		61.1	−1.9
Liberal National	Felicity Westguard		38.9	+1.9
Two-candidate-preferred result
Labor	Shannon Fentiman	15,918	60.7	−2.4
One Nation	Kim Miller	10,285	39.3	+39.3
Labor hold		Swing	−2.4	

=== Whitsunday ===
2017 Queensland state election: Whitsunday
Party	Candidate	Votes	%	±%
Liberal National	Jason Costigan	8,774	32.2	−9.5
Labor	Bronwyn Taha	8,503	31.2	−4.7
One Nation	Noel Skippen	5,471	20.1	+20.1
Katter's Australian	Jenny Whitney	2,499	9.2	+9.2
Greens	Imogen Lindenberg	1,562	5.7	−0.9
Independent Liberal Democrat	Dan Van Blarcom	477	1.7	+1.7
Total formal votes		27,286	96.0	−1.9
Informal votes		1,147	4.0	+1.9
Turnout		28,433	86.3	−0.1
Two-party-preferred result
Liberal National	Jason Costigan	13,829	50.7	+0.1
Labor	Bronwyn Taha	13,457	49.3	−0.1
Liberal National hold		Swing	+0.1	

=== Woodridge ===
2017 Queensland state election: Woodridge
Party	Candidate	Votes	%	±%
Labor	Cameron Dick	17,837	65.1	+1.6
Liberal National	Michael Rooms	4,122	15.0	−5.0
Independent	Trevor Palmer	3,385	12.3	+3.6
Greens	Jacob Rice	2,072	7.6	+0.7
Total formal votes		27,416	92.1	−4.5
Informal votes		2,340	7.9	+4.5
Turnout		29,756	82.0	−2.1
Two-party-preferred result
Labor	Cameron Dick	20,937	76.4	+0.6
Liberal National	Michael Rooms	6,479	23.6	−0.6
Labor hold		Swing	+0.6	
