= Candidates of the 2017 Queensland state election =

This article provides information on candidates who stood for the 2017 Queensland state election. The election was held on 25 November 2017.

At the close of nominations on 8 November 2017, there were 453 candidates standing for the election. The ALP, LNP & The Greens parties nominated candidates for every seat, therefore nominating 93 candidates each. One Nation nominated 61 candidates, KAP nominated 10 and CR nominated 8, whilst Independent or non-registered party candidates stood at 95.

== Redistribution ==
A redistribution of electoral boundaries occurred earlier in 2017.

The electorates of Albert, Ashgrove, Beaudesert, Brisbane Central, Cleveland, Dalrymple, Indooroopilly, Kallangur, Mount Coot-tha, Mount Isa, Sunnybank, and Yeerongpilly were abolished.

The electorates of Bancroft, Bonney, Cooper, Hill, Jordan, Kurwongbah, Macalister, Maiwar, McConnel, Miller, Ninderry, Oodgeroo, Scenic Rim, Theodore, Toohey, and Traeger were created.

The Legislative Assembly was expanded from 89 to 93 members. Indooroopilly was abolished west of Brisbane, while notionally Labor-held Bancroft was created in the corridor north of Brisbane, notionally Liberal National-held Bonney created on the Gold Coast, notionally Labor-held Jordan created in the corridor west of Brisbane, notionally Labor-held Macalister created in the corridor south of Brisbane, and notionally Liberal National-held Ninderry created on the Sunshine Coast. Albert was renamed Theodore, Ashgrove was renamed Cooper, Beaudesert was renamed Scenic Rim, Brisbane Central was renamed McConnel, Cleveland was renamed Oodgeroo, Dalrymple was renamed Hill, Kallangur was renamed Kurwongbah, Mount Coot-tha was renamed Maiwar, Mount Isa was renamed Traeger, Sunnybank was renamed Toohey, and Yeerongpilly was renamed Miller. Burdekin, Mansfield, and Mount Ommaney became notionally Labor-held, while Pumicestone became notionally Liberal National-held.

The changes resulted in 48 notionally Labor-held seats, 2 notionally Katter's Australian-held seats, 42 notionally Liberal National-held seats, and 1 notionally Independent-held seat.

- The member for Albert, Mark Boothman (Liberal National) contested Theodore.
- The member for Ashgrove, Kate Jones (Labor), contested Cooper.
- The member for Beaudesert, Jon Krause (Liberal National), contested Scenic Rim.
- The member for Brisbane Central, Grace Grace (Labor), contested McConnel.
- The member for Cleveland, Mark Robinson (Liberal National), contested Oodgeroo.
- The member for Dalrymple, Shane Knuth (Katter's Australian Party), contested Hill.
- The member for Indooroopilly, Scott Emerson (Liberal National), contested Maiwar.
- The member for Kallangur, Shane King (Labor), contested Kurwongbah.
- The member for Mount Coot-tha, Steven Miles (Labor), contested Murrumba.
- The member for Mount Isa, Robbie Katter (Katter's Australian Party), contested Traeger.
- The member for Murrumba, Chris Whiting (Labor), contested Bancroft.
- The member for Sunnybank, Peter Russo (Labor), contested Toohey.
- The member for Yeerongpilly, Mark Bailey (Labor), contested Miller.

== By-Elections ==
- On 31 March 2015, Billy Gordon (Cook) was expelled from the Labor Party and sat as an independent.
- On 8 March 2016, Rob Pyne (Cairns) resigned from the Labor Party and sat as an independent.
- On 29 April 2016, John McVeigh (Toowoomba South) resigned. At the by-election on 16 July 2016, David Janetzki retained the seat for the Liberal National Party.
- On 14 January 2017, Steve Dickson (Buderim) resigned from the Liberal National Party and joined the One Nation Party.
- On 29 October 2017, Rick Williams (Pumicestone) resigned from the Labor Party and sat as an independent.

== Retiring Members ==
=== Labor ===
- Bill Byrne (Rockhampton) – Announced 7 October 2017

=== Liberal National ===
- Verity Barton (Broadwater) – Lost preselection 28 May 2017
- Ian Rickuss (Lockyer) – Announced 12 November 2016
- Jeff Seeney (Callide) – Announced 2 March 2017
- Lawrence Springborg (Southern Downs) – Announced 3 December 2016

=== Independent ===
- Billy Gordon (Cook) – Elected as Labor; announced 31 October 2017
- Peter Wellington (Nicklin) – Announced 16 February 2017

== Legislative Assembly ==
Sitting members are shown in bold text. Successful candidates are highlighted in the relevant colour. Where there is possible confusion, an asterisk (*) is also used.

Electorate	Held by	Labor candidate	LNP candidate	Greens candidate	One Nation candidate	Other candidates
Algester	Labor	**Leeanne Enoch**	Clinton Pattison	Patsy O'Brien	Darryl Lanyon	
Aspley	LNP	Bart Mellish	**Tracy Davis**	James Hansen	Shaun Byrne	Zachary King (Ind); Steve Ross (Ind); Neil Skilbeck (CLCRNT)
Bancroft	Labor	**Chris Whiting**	Kara Thomas	Simone Dejun	Chris Boulis	Barry Grant (Ind)
Barron River	Labor	**Craig Crawford**	Michael Trout	Cameron Boyd	Andrew Schebella	Andrew Hodgetts (Ind); Cheryl Tonkin (Ind)
Bonney	LNP	Rowan Holzberger	Sam O'Connor	Amin Javanmard		Robert Buegge (Ind); Ron Nightingale (Ind)
Broadwater	LNP	Peter Flori	David Crisafulli	Daniel Kwon	Brenden Ball	
Buderim	LNP	Ken MacKenzie	Brent Mickelberg	Tracy Burton	**Steve Dickson**	
Bulimba	Labor	**Di Farmer**	Fiona Ward	Felicity Jodell		Angus Jell (Ind); Bernadette Le Goullon (Ind)
Bundaberg	Labor	**Leanne Donaldson**	David Batt	Marianne Buchanan	Jane Truscott	Alan Corbett (Ind); Richard Glass (Ind); Richard Smith (Ind)
Bundamba	Labor	**Jo-Ann Miller**	Patrick Herbert	Michelle Duncan		Trev Judd (Ind); Shan-Ju Lin (Ind); Patricia Petersen (Ind)
Burdekin	Labor	Michael Brunker	**Dale Last**	Mathew Bing	Sam Cox	
Burleigh	LNP	Gail Hislop	**Michael Hart**	Peter Burgoyne		
Burnett	LNP	Lee Harvey	**Stephen Bennett**	Tim Roberts	Ashley Lynch	
Cairns	Labor	Michael Healy	Sam Marino	Aaron McDonald	Ian Hodge	**Rob Pyne** (Ind)
Callide	LNP	Darren Blackwood	Colin Boyce	Jaiben Baker	Sharon Lohse	Sandra Anderson (Ind); Robbie Radel (KAP)
Caloundra	LNP	Jason Hunt	**Mark McArdle**	Marcus Finch	Rod Jones	
Capalaba	Labor	**Don Brown**	Cameron Leafe	Joshua Sanderson	Paul Taylor	Jason Lavender (Ind)
Chatsworth	LNP	Paul Keene	**Steve Minnikin**	Dave Nelson		
Clayfield	LNP	Philip Anthony	**Tim Nicholls**	Claire Ogden		
Condamine	LNP	Brendon Huybregts	**Pat Weir**	Chris Turnbull	Frank Ashman	John Hill (KAP)
Cook	Labor	Cynthia Lui	Penny Johnson	Brynn Mathews	Jeanette Sackley	Gordon Rasmussen (KAP)
Coomera	LNP	Christopher Johnson	**Michael Crandon**	Tayla Kerwin	Ronald Pigdon	
Cooper	Labor	**Kate Jones**	Robert Shearman	Reece Walters		Robert Wiltshire (Ind)
Currumbin	LNP	Georgi Leader	**Jann Stuckey**	David Wyatt		Andrew Semple (Ind)
Everton	LNP	David Greene	**Tim Mander**	Bridget Clinch		
Ferny Grove	Labor	**Mark Furner**	Nick Elston	Elizabeth World		Lisa Foo (Ind)
Gaven	LNP	Meaghan Scanlon	**Sid Cramp**	Sally Spain		
Gladstone	Labor	**Glenn Butcher**	Chay Conaglen	Peta Baker	Amy Lohse	
Glass House	LNP	Brent Hampstead	**Andrew Powell**	Sue Weber	Tracey Bell-Henselin	Sue Mureau (Ind)
Greenslopes	Labor	**Joe Kelly**	Ian Kaye	Victor Huml		
Gregory	LNP	Dave Kerrigan	**Lachlan Millar**	Norman Weston	Mark Higgins	Bruce Currie (Ind)
Gympie	LNP	Tracey McWilliam	**Tony Perrett**	Roxanne Kennedy-Perriman	Chelle Dobson	Donna Reardon (Ind)
Hervey Bay	LNP	Adrian Tantari	**Ted Sorensen**	Jenni Cameron	Damian Huxham	Jannean Dean (Ind)
Hill	KAP	Diana O'Brien	Mario Quagliata	Johanna Kloot		**Shane Knuth*** (KAP); Chester Tuxford (Ind); Stewart Worth (Ind)
Hinchinbrook	LNP	Paul Jacob	**Andrew Cripps**	Lyle Burness	Margaret Bell	Nick Dametto* (KAP); Peter Raffles (Ind)
Inala	Labor	**Annastacia Palaszczuk**	Leanne McFarlane	Nav Singh Sidhu		
Ipswich	Labor	**Jennifer Howard**	Andrew Caswell	Brett Morrissey	Malcolm Roberts	Troy Aggett (Ind)
Ipswich West	Labor	**Jim Madden**	Anna O'Neill	Keith Muller	Brad Trussell	
Jordan	Labor	Charis Mullen	Duncan Murray	Steven Purcell	Michael Pucci	Phil Cutcliffe (Ind); Peter Ervik (CLCRNT); Steve Hodgson (Ind)
Kawana	LNP	Mark Moss	**Jarrod Bleijie**	Annette Spendlove		Jeremy Davey (Ind); Michael Jessop (Ind)
Keppel	Labor	**Brittany Lauga**	Peter Blundell	Clancy Mullbrick	Matt Loth	
Kurwongbah	Labor	**Shane King**	Allan Cook	Rachel Doherty	Karen Haddock	Thor Prohaska (Ind)
Lockyer	LNP	Nicole Lincoln	Jim McDonald	Ian Simons	James Savage	Tony Parr (Ind)
Logan	Labor	**Linus Power**	Gloria Vicario	Liam Jenkinson	Scott Bannan	Danielle Cox (Ind); Daniel Murphy (Ind)
Lytton	Labor	**Joan Pease**	Karren Strahan	Ken Austin	Suzanne Black	
Macalister	Labor	Melissa McMahon	Judi van Manen	Gabi Nehring		Greg Bradley (Ind); Janelle Clancy (Ind); Hetty Johnston (Ind); Ben Musgrave (CLCRNT)
Mackay	Labor	**Julieanne Gilbert**	Nicole Batzloff	Elliot Jennings	Jeff Keioskie	Martin McCann (Ind)
Maiwar	LNP	Ali King	**Scott Emerson**	Michael Berkman		Anita Diamond (Ind)
Mansfield	Labor	Corrine McMillan	**Ian Walker**	Barbara Bell	Neil Symes	
Maroochydore	LNP	Julie McGlone	**Fiona Simpson**	Daniel Bryar	Cam Young	
Maryborough	Labor	**Bruce Saunders**	Richard Kingston	Craig Armstrong	James Hansen	Roger Currie (Ind)
McConnel	Labor	**Grace Grace**	Jamie Forster	Kirsten Lovejoy		John Dobinson (Ind); Kamala Emanuel (Ind); Edward Gilmour (Ind)
Mermaid Beach	LNP	Joshua Blundell-Thornton	**Ray Stevens**	Helen Wainwright		Ric Allport (Ind); Saraya Beric (Ind); Mona Hecke (Ind); Gary Pead (Ind)
Miller	Labor	**Mark Bailey**	Belinda Kippen	Deniz Clarke		Ted Starr (Ind)
Mirani	Labor	**Jim Pearce**	Kerry Latter	Christine Carlisle	Stephen Andrew	
Moggill	LNP	Evan Jones	**Christian Rowan**	Lawson McCane		Amy Rayward (CLCRNT)
Morayfield	Labor	**Mark Ryan**	Jason Snow	Gavin Behrens	Rodney Hansen	Jamie Janulewicz (Ind)
Mount Ommaney	Labor	Jess Pugh	**Tarnya Smith**	Jenny Mulkearns	Ian Eugarde	
Mudgeeraba	LNP	Paul Taylor	**Ros Bates**	Rod Duncan	Andrew Liddell	Jill Pead (Ind); Bill Sherwood (Ind)
Mulgrave	Labor	**Curtis Pitt**	Karina Samperi	Carmel Murray	Sue Bertuch	
Mundingburra	Labor	**Coralee O'Rourke**	Matthew Derlagen	Jenny Brown	Mal Charlwood	Mike Abraham (KAP); Alan Birrell (Ind); Dennis Easzon (Ind); Geoff Virgo (Ind)
Murrumba	Labor	**Steven Miles**	Reg Gulley	Jason Kennedy	Scott Dare	
Nanango	LNP	Ben Rankin	**Deb Frecklington**	John Harbison	Douglas Grant	
Nicklin	Independent	Justin Raethel	Marty Hunt	Mick Tyrrell	Steven Ford	Jeffrey Hodges (CLCRNT); Tony Moore (Ind); Rachel Radic (Ind)
Ninderry	LNP	Bill Gissane	Dan Purdie	Sue Etheridge	Barry Ward	Richard Bruinsma (Ind); Jamila Riley (Ind)
Noosa	LNP	Mark Denham	**Glen Elmes**	Phillip Jenkins	Eve-Marie Whiteside	Sandy Bolton* (Ind); Robin Bristow (Ind); Aaron White (Ind)
Nudgee	Labor	**Leanne Linard**	Debbie Glaze	Ell-Leigh Ackerman		Anthony Simpson (Ind)
Oodgeroo	LNP	Tony Austin	**Mark Robinson**	Brad Scott		
Pine Rivers	Labor	**Nikki Boyd**	Chris Thompson	Jack Margaritis	Peter Warren	Greg French (CLCRNT); Seath Holswich (Ind); Michael Kosenko (Ind)
Pumicestone	LNP	Michael Hoogwaerts	Simone Wilson	Tony Longland	Greg Fahey	Jason Burgess (Ind); **Rick Williams** (Ind)
Redcliffe	Labor	**Yvette D'Ath**	Kerri-Anne Dooley	James Bovill		Shayne Jarvis (Ind); Ian Philp (Ind); Graham Young (Ind)
Redlands	LNP	Kim Richards	**Matt McEachan**	David Keogh	Jason Quick	Peter Dowling (Ind)
Rockhampton	Labor	Barry O'Rourke	Douglas Rodgers	Kate Giamarelos	Wade Rothery	Margaret Strelow (Ind)
Sandgate	Labor	**Stirling Hinchliffe**	Jessie Van Der Hoek	Miree Le Roy	Matthew Stephen	
Scenic Rim	LNP	Carolyn Buchan	**Jon Krause**	Shannon Girard	Rod Smith	
South Brisbane	Labor	**Jackie Trad**	Simon Quinn	Amy MacMahon		Karel Boele (Ind); Frank Jordan (Ind); Karagh-Mae Kelly (Ind); Cameron Murray (Ind)
Southern Downs	LNP	Joel Richters	James Lister	Antonia van Geuns	Joshua Coyne	Rob Mackenzie (Ind); Jay Nauss (Ind)
Southport	LNP	Judy Searle	**Rob Molhoek**	Michelle Le Plastrier		Rick Flori (Ind); Johan Joubert (CLCRNT)
Springwood	Labor	**Mick de Brenni**	Julie Talty	Neil Cotter		John Taylor (CLCRNT)
Stafford	Labor	**Anthony Lynham**	Ed Sangjitphun	John Meyer		
Stretton	Labor	**Duncan Pegg**	Freya Ostapovitch	Anisa Nandaula	Shane Holley	Shyamal Reddy (Ind)
Surfers Paradise	LNP	Tony Walker	**John-Paul Langbroek**	Scott Turner		Tylere Baker-Pearce (Ind); Chris Manley (Ind)
Theodore	LNP	Luz Stanton	**Mark Boothman**	Tina Meni	Darrell Lane	
Thuringowa	Labor	**Aaron Harper**	Nick Martinez	Mike Rubenach	Mark Thornton	Terry Fox (KAP); Stephen Lane (Ind)
Toohey	Labor	**Peter Russo**	Anthony Shorten	Gordon King	Guansheng Zhang	
Toowoomba North	LNP	Kerry Shine	**Trevor Watts**	Emmeline Chidley	Paul Wilson	Josie Townsend (Ind)
Toowoomba South	LNP	Susan Krause	**David Janetzki**	Alyce Nelligan	Jeremy Scamp	Rob Berry (Ind)
Townsville	Labor	**Scott Stewart**	Casie Scott	Rebecca Ryan	Allan Evans	Lindy Collins (Ind)
Traeger	KAP	Danielle Slade	Ronald Bird	Peter Relph		Sarah Isaacs (Ind); **Robbie Katter*** (KAP); Craig Scriven (Ind)
Warrego	LNP	Mark O'Brien	**Ann Leahy**	Ian Mazlin		Sandra Bamberry (Ind); Rob Loughnan (KAP); Mark Stone (Ind)
Waterford	Labor	**Shannon Fentiman**	Felicity Westguard	Kirsty Petersen	Kim Miller	Lee McKenzie McKinnon (Ind)
Whitsunday	LNP	Bronwyn Taha	**Jason Costigan**	Imogen Lindenberg	Noel Skippen	Dan Van Blarcom (Ind); Jenny Whitney (KAP)
Woodridge	Labor	**Cameron Dick**	Michael Rooms	Jacob Rice		Trevor Palmer (Ind)

== Unregistered parties and groups ==
- The Animal Justice Party endorsed Lisa Foo in Ferny Grove, Danielle Cox in Logan, Janelle Clancy in Macalister, Ric Allport in Mermaid Beach, Rachel Radic in Nicklin, Jamila Riley in Ninderry and Karagh-Mae Kelly in South Brisbane.
- The Australian Workers Party endorsed Sue Mureau in Glass House, and Greg Bradley in Macalister.
- The Whig Party endorsed Mike Jessop in Kawana.
- The North Queensland Party endorsed Peter Raffles in Hinchinbrook.
- People Decide endorsed Angus Jell in Bulimba, Anita Diamond in Maiwar and Karel Boele in South Brisbane.
- The Reason Party endorsed Robin Bristow in Noosa.
- The Socialist Alliance endorsed Kamala Emanuel in McConnel.
