= Women in the Queensland Legislative Assembly =

There have been 97 women in the Legislative Assembly of Queensland since its establishment in 1860. Women have had the right to vote in the Assembly since 1905 and the right to stand as candidates since 1915.

The first successful female candidate for the Legislative Assembly was Irene Longman, who was elected as the member for Bulimba in 1929 representing the Country and Progressive National Party. She was defeated in 1932, and women were not represented again until 1966, when Labor's Vi Jordan won the seat of Ipswich West. Although Jordan was defeated in 1974, that year also saw two more women, Vicky Kippin of the National Party and Rosemary Kyburz of the Liberal Party, enter parliament.

1989 was considered a breakthrough year for women in the Queensland Parliament, as previously only 11 women had sat in the parliament. The first female minister was Yvonne Chapman in 1986. In 1991, Joan Sheldon became the first woman to lead a Party, and in 1996, she became the first woman Treasurer. In 2012, Fiona Simpson became the first woman Speaker. The first non-major party woman, independent Liz Cunningham, was elected as the member for Gladstone in 1995. Since then, four other women, Dorothy Pratt, Rosa Lee Long, Elisa Roberts, and Sandy Bolton have won seats for non-major parties or as independents. Pratt, Lee Long and Roberts were originally elected for One Nation, although Pratt and Roberts subsequently retained their seats as independents. Only two Indigenous Australian women, Leeanne Enoch (2015) and Cynthia Lui (2017), have been elected to the Queensland parliament.

Anna Bligh was the first woman to become Premier, succeeding Peter Beattie in 2007. In 2009 she became the first woman in Australia to win an election as Premier. In 2015, the two highest ministers in the Queensland government were both women with Annastacia Palaszczuk as Premier and Jackie Trad as Deputy Premier, the second in Australian political history. Palaszczuk was also the first woman to lead an opposition into government. The Palaszczuk Ministry was the first female dominated government in Australian history with 8 out of the 14 ministers being women.

Although women have been Members of the Queensland Legislative Assembly since 1966, they are still under-represented as a proportion compared to men. In 2001, Queensland held the record for the proportion of women in the parliament with 33 out of 89 members (37%) being women. Since then the proportion of women have fallen. There were 25 women out of 89 members (28%) in the 2015 Queensland Parliament.

== List of women in the Queensland Legislative Assembly ==
Names in bold indicate women who have been appointed as Ministers and Parliamentary Secretaries during their time in Parliament. Names in italics indicate women who were first elected at a by-election.

#	Name	Party	Electoral Division	Period of service
1	Irene Longman	Progressive Nationalist	Bulimba	11 May 1929 – 11 June 1932 (defeated)
2	Vi Jordan	Labor	Ipswich West	28 May 1966 – 7 December 1974 (defeated)
3	Vicky Kippin	National	Mourilyan	7 December 1974 – 29 November 1980 (defeated)
3	Rosemary Kyburz	Liberal	Salisbury	7 December 1974 – 22 October 1983 (defeated)
5	**Beryce Nelson**	Liberal/National	Aspley	29 November 1980 – 22 October 1983 (resigned); 1 November 1986 – 2 December 1989 (defeated)
6	**Yvonne Chapman**	National	Pine Rivers	22 October 1983 – 2 December 1989 (defeated)
6	**Anne Warner**	Labor	Kurilpa; South Brisbane	22 October 1983 – 15 July 1995 (retired)
8	**Leisha Harvey**	National	Greenslopes	22 October 1983 – 2 December 1989 (defeated)
9	**Di McCauley**	National	Callide	1 November 1986 – 13 June 1998 (retired)
10	Judy Gamin	National	South Coast; Burleigh	28 August 1988 – 2 December 1989 (defeated); 19 September 1992 – 17 February 2001 (defeated)
11	Lorraine Bird	Labor	Whitsunday	2 December 1989 – 13 June 1998 (defeated)
11	Lesley Clark	Labor	Barron River	2 December 1989 – 15 July 1995 (defeated); 13 June 1998 – 9 September 2006 (retired)
11	**Wendy Edmond**	Labor	Mount Coot-tha	2 December 1989 – 7 February 2004 (retired)
11	Laurel Power	Labor	Mansfield	2 December 1989 – 15 July 1995 (defeated)
11	**Molly Robson**	Labor	Springwood	2 December 1989 – 15 July 1995 (defeated)
11	**Judy Spence**	Labor	Mount Gravatt; Sunnybank	2 December 1989 – 24 March 2012 (retired)
11	**Margaret Woodgate**	Labor	Pine Rivers; Kurwongbah	2 December 1989 – 17 March 1997 (resigned)
18	**Joan Sheldon**	Liberal	Landsborough; Caloundra	28 July 1990 – 7 February 2004 (retired)
19	**Merri Rose**	Labor	Currumbin	19 September 1992 – 7 February 2004 (defeated)
19	Fiona Simpson	National/Liberal National	Maroochydore	19 September 1992 –
21	**Anna Bligh**	Labor	South Brisbane	15 July 1995 – 30 March 2012 (resigned)
21	Liz Cunningham	Independent	Gladstone	15 July 1995 – 31 January 2015 (retired)
21	Lyn Warwick	Liberal	Barron River	15 July 1995 – 13 June 1998 (defeated)
21	**Naomi Wilson**	National	Mulgrave	15 July 1995 – 13 June 1998 (defeated)
25	**Linda Lavarch**	Labor	Kurwongbah	24 May 1997 – 20 March 2009 (retired)
26	**Julie Attwood**	Labor	Mount Ommaney	13 June 1998 – 24 March 2012 (retired)
26	**Desley Boyle**	Labor	Cairns	13 June 1998 – 24 March 2012 (retired)
26	**Nita Cunningham**	Labor	Bundaberg	13 June 1998 – 14 August 2006 (retired)
26	**Lindy Nelson-Carr**	Labor	Mundingburra	13 June 1998 – 24 March 2012 (retired)
26	Dorothy Pratt	One Nation/Independent	Barambah; Nanango	13 June 1998 – 24 March 2012 (retired)
26	**Karen Struthers**	Labor	Archerfield; Algester	13 June 1998 – 24 March 2012 (defeated)
32	**Jo-Ann Miller**	Labor	Bundamba	5 February 2000 – 20 February 2020 (resigned)
33	Bonny Barry	Labor	Aspley	17 February 2001 – 20 March 2009 (defeated)
33	Liddy Clark	Labor	Clayfield	17 February 2001 – 9 September 2006 (defeated)
33	**Peta-Kaye Croft**	Labor	Broadwater	17 February 2001 – 24 March 2012 (defeated)
33	**Jan Jarratt**	Labor	Whitsunday	17 February 2001 – 24 March 2012 (defeated)
33	**Margaret Keech**	Labor	Albert	17 February 2001 – 24 March 2012 (defeated)
33	Rosa Lee Long	One Nation	Tablelands	17 February 2001 – 20 March 2009 (defeated)
33	**Carolyn Male**	Labor	Glass House; Pine Rivers	17 February 2001 – 24 March 2012 (retired)
33	Cate Molloy	Labor/Independent	Noosa	17 February 2001 – 9 September 2006 (defeated)
33	**Rachel Nolan**	Labor	Ipswich	17 February 2001 – 24 March 2012 (defeated)
33	Anita Phillips	Labor	Thuringowa	17 February 2001 – 7 February 2004 (retired)
33	Dianne Reilly	Labor	Mudgeeraba	17 February 2001 – 20 March 2009 (defeated)
33	Elisa Roberts	One Nation/Independent	Gympie	17 February 2001 – 9 September 2006 (defeated)
33	Christine Scott	Labor	Charters Towers	17 February 2001 – 7 February 2004 (defeated)
33	Desley Scott	Labor	Woodridge	17 February 2001 – 31 January 2015 (retired)
33	Christine Smith	Labor	Burleigh	17 February 2001 – 24 March 2012 (defeated)
33	Barbara Stone	Labor	Springwood	17 February 2001 – 24 March 2012 (defeated)
33	Carryn Sullivan	Labor	Pumicestone	17 February 2001 – 24 March 2012 (defeated)
50	Rosemary Menkens	National/Liberal National	Burdekin	7 February 2004 – 31 January 2015 (retired)
50	**Jann Stuckey**	Liberal/Liberal National	Currumbin	7 February 2004 – 1 February 2020 (resigned)
52	Vicky Darling	Labor	Sandgate	9 September 2006 – 24 March 2012 (defeated)
52	**Kate Jones**	Labor	Ashgrove; Cooper	9 September 2006 – 24 March 2012 (defeated); 31 January 2015 – 31 October 2020 (retired)
52	Betty Kiernan	Labor	Mount Isa	9 September 2006 – 24 March 2012 (defeated)
52	**Annastacia Palaszczuk**	Labor	Inala	9 September 2006 – 31 December 2023 (retired)
52	Lillian van Litsenburg	Labor	Redcliffe	9 September 2006 – 24 March 2012 (defeated)
57	Grace Grace	Labor	Brisbane Central; McConnel	13 October 2007 – 24 March 2012 (defeated); 31 January 2015 –
58	**Ros Bates**	Liberal National	Mudgeeraba	21 March 2009 –
58	**Tracy Davis**	Liberal National	Aspley	21 March 2009 – 25 November 2017 (defeated)
58	Di Farmer	Labor	Bulimba	21 March 2009 – 24 March 2012 (defeated); 31 January 2015 –
58	Mandy Johnstone	Labor	Townsville	21 March 2009 – 24 March 2012 (defeated)
58	Mary-Anne O'Neill	Labor	Kallangur	21 March 2009 – 24 March 2012 (defeated)
63	Verity Barton	Liberal National	Broadwater	24 March 2012 – 25 November 2017 (retired)
63	**Lisa France**	Liberal National	Pumicestone	24 March 2012 – 31 January 2015 (defeated)
63	**Deb Frecklington**	Liberal National	Nanango	24 March 2012 –
63	Anne Maddern	Liberal National	Maryborough	24 March 2012 – 31 January 2015 (defeated)
63	Kerry Millard	Liberal National	Sandgate	24 March 2012 – 31 January 2015 (defeated)
63	Freya Ostapovitch	Liberal National	Stretton	24 March 2012 – 31 January 2015 (defeated)
63	**Saxon Rice**	Liberal National	Mount Coot-tha	24 March 2012 – 31 January 2015 (defeated)
63	**Tarnya Smith**	Liberal National	Mount Ommaney	24 March 2012 – 25 November 2017 (defeated)
71	**Jackie Trad**	Labor	South Brisbane	28 April 2012 – 31 October 2020 (defeated)
72	**Yvette D'Ath**	Labor	Redcliffe	22 February 2014 – 26 October 2024 (retired)
73	Nikki Boyd	Labor	Pine Rivers	31 January 2015 –
73	**Leanne Donaldson**	Labor	Bundaberg	31 January 2015 – 25 November 2017 (defeated)
73	**Leeanne Enoch**	Labor	Algester	31 January 2015 –
73	**Shannon Fentiman**	Labor	Waterford	31 January 2015 –
73	Julieanne Gilbert	Labor	Mackay	31 January 2015 – 26 October 2024 (retired)
73	**Jennifer Howard**	Labor	Ipswich	31 January 2015 –
73	Brittany Lauga	Labor	Keppel	31 January 2015 – 26 October 2024 (defeated)
73	Ann Leahy	Liberal National	Warrego	31 January 2015 –
73	Leanne Linard	Labor	Nudgee	31 January 2015 –
73	**Coralee O'Rourke**	Labor	Mundingburra	31 January 2015 – 31 October 2020 (retired)
73	Joan Pease	Labor	Lytton	31 January 2015 –
84	Sandy Bolton	Independent	Noosa	25 November 2017 –
84	Cynthia Lui	Labor	Cook	25 November 2017 – 26 October 2024 (defeated)
84	Melissa McMahon	Labor	Macalister	25 November 2017 –
84	Corrine McMillan	Labor	Mansfield	25 November 2017 –
84	Charis Mullen	Labor	Jordan	25 November 2017 –
84	Jess Pugh	Labor	Mount Ommaney	25 November 2017 –
84	Kim Richards	Labor	Redlands	25 November 2017 – 26 October 2024 (defeated)
84	**Meaghan Scanlon**	Labor	Gaven	25 November 2017 –
84	Simone Wilson	Liberal National	Pumicestone	25 November 2017 – 31 October 2020 (retired)
93	Laura Gerber	Liberal National	Currumbin	28 March 2020 –
94	Jonty Bush	Labor	Cooper	31 October 2020 –
94	Amanda Camm	Liberal National	Whitsunday	31 October 2020 –
94	Ali King	Labor	Pumicestone	31 October 2020 – 26 October 2024 (defeated)
94	Amy MacMahon	Greens	South Brisbane	31 October 2020 – 26 October 2024 (defeated)
98	Margie Nightingale	Labor	Inala	16 March 2024 -
99	Bisma Asif	Labor	Sandgate	26 October 2024 -
99	Wendy Bourne	Labor	Ipswich West	26 October 2024 -
99	Ariana Doolan	Liberal National	Pumicestone	26 October 2024 -
99	Kerri-Anne Dooley	Liberal National	Redcliffe	26 October 2024 -
99	Bree James	Liberal National	Barron River	26 October 2024 -
99	Donna Kirkland	Liberal National	Rockhampton	26 October 2024 -
99	Natalie Marr	Liberal National	Thuringowa	26 October 2024 -
99	Kendall Morton	Liberal National	Caloundra	26 October 2024 -
99	Barbara O'Shea	Labor	South Brisbane	26 October 2024 -
99	Janelle Poole	Liberal National	Mundingburra	26 October 2024 -
99	Amanda Stoker	Liberal National	Oodgeroo	26 October 2024 -
99	Rebecca Young	Liberal National	Redlands	26 October 2024 -

== Proportion of women in the Assembly ==
Numbers and proportions are as they were directly after the relevant election and do not take into account by-elections, defections or other changes in membership. The Liberal column also includes that party's predecessors, the Country and Progressive National, United Australia and People's parties, as well as the successor of both the Liberal and National parties, the Liberal National Party.

Term	Labor			Liberal			National			Others			Total		
Term	Women	Total	%	Women	Total	%	Women	Total	%	Women	Total	%	Women	Total	%
1929–1932	0	27	0.0%	1	43	2.3%	0	0	0.0%	0	2	0.0%	1	72	1.4%
1932–1935	0	33	0.0%	0	28	0.0%	0	0	0.0%	0	1	0.0%	0	62	0.0%
1935–1938	0	46	0.0%	0	16	0.0%	0	0	0.0%	0	0	0.0%	0	62	0.0%
1938–1941	0	44	0.0%	0	4	0.0%	0	13	0.0%	0	1	0.0%	0	62	0.0%
1941–1944	0	41	0.0%	0	4	0.0%	0	14	0.0%	0	3	0.0%	0	62	0.0%
1944–1947	0	37	0.0%	0	7	0.0%	0	12	0.0%	0	6	0.0%	0	62	0.0%
1947–1950	0	35	0.0%	0	9	0.0%	0	14	0.0%	0	4	0.0%	0	62	0.0%
1950–1953	0	42	0.0%	0	11	0.0%	0	20	0.0%	0	2	0.0%	0	75	0.0%
1953–1956	0	50	0.0%	0	8	0.0%	0	15	0.0%	0	2	0.0%	0	75	0.0%
1956–1957	0	49	0.0%	0	8	0.0%	0	16	0.0%	0	2	0.0%	0	75	0.0%
1957–1960	0	20	0.0%	0	18	0.0%	0	24	0.0%	0	13	0.0%	0	75	0.0%
1960–1963	0	25	0.0%	0	20	0.0%	0	26	0.0%	0	7	0.0%	0	78	0.0%
1963–1966	0	26	0.0%	0	20	0.0%	0	26	0.0%	0	6	0.0%	0	78	0.0%
1966–1969	1	26	3.8%	0	20	0.0%	0	27	0.0%	0	5	0.0%	1	78	1.3%
1969–1972	1	31	3.2%	0	19	0.0%	0	26	0.0%	0	2	0.0%	1	78	1.3%
1972–1974	1	33	3.0%	0	21	0.0%	0	26	0.0%	0	2	0.0%	1	82	1.2%
1974–1977	0	11	0.0%	1	30	3.3%	1	39	2.6%	0	2	0.0%	2	82	2.4%
1977–1980	0	23	0.0%	1	24	4.2%	1	35	2.9%	0	0	0.0%	2	82	2.4%
1980–1983	0	25	0.0%	2	22	9.1%	0	35	0.0%	0	0	0.0%	2	82	2.4%
1983–1986	1	32	3.1%	0	8	0.0%	2	41	4.9%	0	1	0.0%	3	82	3.7%
1986–1989	1	30	3.3%	0	10	0.0%	4	49	6.1%	0	0	0.0%	5	89	5.6%
1989–1992	8	54	14.8%	0	8	0.0%	1	27	3.7%	0	0	0.0%	9	89	10.1%
1992–1995	9	54	16.7%	1	9	11.1%	3	26	11.5%	0	0	0.0%	13	89	14.6%
1995–1998	6	45	13.3%	2	14	14.2%	4	29	13.7%	1	1	100.0%	13	89	14.6%
1998–2001	11	44	25.0%	1	9	11.1%	2	23	8.7%	2	13	15.3%	16	89	18.0%
2001–2004	27	66	40.9%	1	3	33.3%	1	12	8.3%	4	8	50.0%	33	89	37.1%
2004–2006	23	63	36.5%	1	5	20.0%	2	15	13.3%	4	6	66.7%	30	89	33.7%
2006–2009	24	59	40.7%	1	8	12.5%	2	17	11.8%	3	5	60.0%	30	89	33.7%
2009–2012	25	51	49.0%	5	34	14.7%	0	0	0.0%	2	4	50.0%	32	89	36.0%
2012–2015	4	7	57.1%	13	78	16.7%	0	0	0.0%	1	4	25.0%	18	89	20.2%
2015–2017	17	44	38.6%	8	42	19.0%	0	0	0.0%	0	3	0.0%	25	89	28.1%
2017–2020	23	48	47.9%	6	39	15.4%	0	0	0.0%	1	6	16.7%	30	93	32.3%
2020–2024	21	52	40.4%	6	34	17.6%	0	0	0.0%	2	7	28.6%	29	93	31.2%
2024–	18	36	50.0%	15	52	28.8%	0	0	0.0%	1	5	20.0%	34	93	36.6%

== See also ==
- Women and government in Australia
