= Post-election pendulum for the 2017 Queensland state election =

The following is a Mackerras pendulum for the 2017 Queensland state election.

"Safe" seats require a swing of over 10 per cent to change, "fairly safe" seats require a swing of between 6 and 10 per cent, while "marginal" seats require a swing of less than 6 per cent.

Labor seats (48)
Marginal
Townsville	Scott Stewart	ALP	0.4
Gaven	Meaghan Scanlon	ALP	0.7
Mundingburra	Coralee O'Rourke	ALP	1.1
Aspley	Bart Mellish	ALP	1.2
Mansfield	Corrine McMillan	ALP	1.6
Barron River	Craig Crawford	ALP	1.9
Maryborough	Bruce Saunders	ALP	2.5 v ONP
Keppel	Brittany Lauga	ALP	3.1 v ONP
Redlands	Kim Richards	ALP	3.1
Cairns	Michael Healy	ALP	3.4
South Brisbane	Jackie Trad	ALP	3.6 v GRN
Springwood	Mick de Brenni	ALP	3.6
Thuringowa	Aaron Harper	ALP	4.1 v ONP
Ferny Grove	Mark Furner	ALP	4.6
Redcliffe	Yvette D'Ath	ALP	4.9
Rockhampton	Barry O'Rourke	ALP	5.2 v ONP
Cook	Cynthia Lui	ALP	5.8 v ONP
Mount Ommaney	Jess Pugh	ALP	5.8
Fairly safe
Bancroft	Chris Whiting	ALP	6.2
Pine Rivers	Nikki Boyd	ALP	6.2
Logan	Linus Power	ALP	6.8 v ONP
Kurwongbah	Shane King	ALP	7.0
Macalister	Melissa McMahon	ALP	7.4
Capalaba	Don Brown	ALP	7.9
McConnel	Grace Grace	ALP	7.9
Miller	Mark Bailey	ALP	8.2
Mackay	Julieanne Gilbert	ALP	8.3
Ipswich West	Jim Madden	ALP	8.7 v ONP
Morayfield	Mark Ryan	ALP	8.7 v ONP
Murrumba	Steven Miles	ALP	9.5
Jordan	Charis Mullen	ALP	9.9 v ONP
Stretton	Duncan Pegg	ALP	9.9
Safe
Toohey	Peter Russo	ALP	10.0
Greenslopes	Joe Kelly	ALP	10.1
Cooper	Kate Jones	ALP	10.6
Waterford	Shannon Fentiman	ALP	10.7 v ONP
Bulimba	Di Farmer	ALP	10.8
Ipswich	Jennifer Howard	ALP	10.9 v ONP
Mulgrave	Curtis Pitt	ALP	10.9
Lytton	Joan Pease	ALP	12.0
Stafford	Anthony Lynham	ALP	12.1
Sandgate	Stirling Hinchliffe	ALP	13.5
Nudgee	Leanne Linard	ALP	14.3
Algester	Leeanne Enoch	ALP	14.4
Gladstone	Glenn Butcher	ALP	20.7 v ONP
Bundamba	Jo-Ann Miller	ALP	21.6
Inala	Annastacia Palaszczuk	ALP	26.1
Woodridge	Cameron Dick	ALP	26.4

Liberal National seats (39)
Marginal
Whitsunday	Jason Costigan	LNP	0.7
Burdekin	Dale Last	LNP	0.8
Pumicestone	Simone Wilson	LNP	0.8
Bonney	Sam O'Connor	LNP	1.7
Clayfield	Tim Nicholls	LNP	2.4
Chatsworth	Steve Minnikin	LNP	2.9
Currumbin	Jann Stuckey	LNP	3.3
Caloundra	Mark McArdle	LNP	3.4
Glass House	Andrew Powell	LNP	3.4
Coomera	Michael Crandon	LNP	3.5
Theodore	Mark Boothman	LNP	3.7
Lockyer	Jim McDonald	LNP	4.1 v ONP
Bundaberg	David Batt	LNP	4.2
Burleigh	Michael Hart	LNP	4.9
Everton	Tim Mander	LNP	4.9
Moggill	Christian Rowan	LNP	5.0
Nicklin	Marty Hunt	LNP	5.3
Toowoomba North	Trevor Watts	LNP	5.7
Fairly safe
Callide	Colin Boyce	LNP	6.1 v ONP
Mermaid Beach	Ray Stevens	LNP	6.3
Oodgeroo	Mark Robinson	LNP	7.2
Southport	Rob Molhoek	LNP	7.2
Ninderry	Dan Purdie	LNP	8.4
Maroochydore	Fiona Simpson	LNP	8.5
Gympie	Tony Perrett	LNP	8.7 v ONP
Hervey Bay	Ted Sorensen	LNP	9.1
Warrego	Ann Leahy	LNP	9.5 v KAP
Mudgeeraba	Ros Bates	LNP	9.8
Safe
Toowoomba South	David Janetzki	LNP	10.0
Burnett	Stephen Bennett	LNP	10.7
Condamine	Pat Weir	LNP	10.7 v ONP
Buderim	Brent Mickelberg	LNP	11.4
Kawana	Jarrod Bleijie	LNP	13.1
Scenic Rim	Jon Krause	LNP	13.1 v ONP
Southern Downs	James Lister	LNP	13.1 v ONP
Nanango	Deb Frecklington	LNP	13.4 v ONP
Gregory	Lachlan Millar	LNP	13.9 v ONP
Broadwater	David Crisafulli	LNP	18.0
Surfers Paradise	John-Paul Langbroek	LNP	19.8
Crossbench seats (6)
Maiwar	Michael Berkman	GRN	1.6 v LNP
Mirani	Stephen Andrew	ONP	4.8 v ALP
Hinchinbrook	Nick Dametto	KAP	7.6 v LNP
Noosa	Sandy Bolton	IND	11.5 v LNP
Hill	Shane Knuth	KAP	19.7 v LNP
Traeger	Robbie Katter	KAP	28.5 v ALP
