= Pre-election pendulum for the 2017 Queensland state election =

The following is a Mackerras pendulum prior to the 2017 Queensland state election.

"Very safe" seats require a swing of more than 20 points to change, "safe" seats 10–20 points to change, "fairly safe" seats 6–10 points, and "marginal" seats less than 6 points.

Labor seats
Marginal
| Bundaberg | Leanne Donaldson | ALP | 0.5 |
| Mansfield | Ian Walker (LNP) | ALP | 0.8 |
| Mount Ommaney | Tarnya Smith (LNP) | ALP | 1.0 |
| Maryborough | Bruce Saunders | ALP | 1.1 |
| Burdekin | Dale Last (LNP) | ALP | 1.4 |
| Springwood | Mick de Brenni | ALP | 1.4 |
| Mundingburra | Coralee O'Rourke | ALP | 1.8 |
| McConnel | Grace Grace | ALP | 3.1 |
| Cooper | Kate Jones | ALP | 3.3 |
| Barron River | Craig Crawford | ALP | 3.6 |
| Mirani | Jim Pearce | ALP | 3.8 |
| Keppel | Brittany Lauga | ALP | 4.1 |
| Pine Rivers | Nikki Boyd | ALP | 4.1 |
| Greenslopes | Joe Kelly | ALP | 5.0 |
| Ferny Grove | Mark Furner | ALP | 5.3 |
| Stretton | Duncan Pegg | ALP | 5.3 |
| Miller | Mark Bailey | ALP | 5.6 |
| Townsville | Scott Stewart | ALP | 5.7 |
| Logan | Linus Power | ALP | 5.9 |
Fairly safe
| Bulimba | Di Farmer | ALP | 6.1 |
| Murrumba | Chris Whiting | ALP | 6.3 |
| Macalister | New seat | ALP | 6.4 |
| Capalaba | Don Brown | ALP | 6.5 |
| Thuringowa | Aaron Harper | ALP | 6.6 |
| Cook | Billy Gordon | ALP | 6.8 |
| Kurwongbah | Shane King | ALP | 7.1 |
| Redcliffe | Yvette D'Ath | ALP | 7.6 |
| Bancroft | Chris Whiting | ALP | 8.3 |
| Toohey | Peter Russo | ALP | 8.3 |
| Ipswich West | Jim Madden | ALP | 9.1 |
| Nudgee | Leanne Linard | ALP | 9.2 |
| Stafford | Anthony Lynham | ALP | 9.3 |
| Algester | Leeanne Enoch | ALP | 9.6 |
| Lytton | Joan Pease | ALP | 9.9 |
Safe
| Sandgate | Stirling Hinchliffe | ALP | 10.1 |
| Mackay | Julieanne Gilbert | ALP | 10.2 |
| Mulgrave | Curtis Pitt | ALP | 12.9 |
| Waterford | Shannon Fentiman | ALP | 13.1 |
| Jordan | New seat | ALP | 13.5 |
| Morayfield | Mark Ryan | ALP | 13.5 |
| South Brisbane | Jackie Trad | ALP | 13.8 |
| Rockhampton | Bill Byrne | ALP | 14.0 |
| Ipswich | Jennifer Howard | ALP | 16.0 |
Very safe
| Inala | Annastacia Palaszczuk | ALP | 20.6 |
| Gladstone | Glenn Butcher | ALP v IND | 25.3 |
| Woodridge | Cameron Dick | ALP | 25.8 |
| Bundamba | Jo-Ann Miller | ALP | 25.9 |

Liberal National seats
Marginal
| Whitsunday | Jason Costigan | LNP | 0.6 |
| Glass House | Andrew Powell | LNP | 0.9 |
| Redlands | Matt McEachan | LNP | 1.2 |
| Toowoomba North | Trevor Watts | LNP | 1.6 |
| Lockyer | Ian Rickuss | LNP v PHON | 1.6 |
| Bonney | New seat | LNP | 2.2 |
| Everton | Tim Mander | LNP | 2.5 |
| Gaven | Sid Cramp | LNP | 2.8 |
| Maiwar | Scott Emerson | LNP | 3.0 |
| Aspley | Tracy Davis | LNP | 3.2 |
| Hinchinbrook | Andrew Cripps | LNP | 3.4 |
| Chatsworth | Steve Minnikin | LNP | 3.3 |
| Caloundra | Mark McArdle | LNP | 4.7 |
| Theodore | Mark Boothman | LNP | 5.3 |
| Burleigh | Michael Hart | LNP | 5.5 |
| Currumbin | Jann Stuckey | LNP | 5.7 |
| Oodgeroo | Mark Robinson | LNP | 5.7 |
| Coomera | Michael Crandon | LNP | 5.8 |
Fairly safe
| Hervey Bay | Ted Sorensen | LNP | 6.5 |
| Burnett | Stephen Bennett | LNP | 6.6 |
| Clayfield | Tim Nicholls | LNP | 6.6 |
| Noosa | Glen Elmes | LNP | 6.8 |
| Ninderry | New seat | LNP | 6.9 |
| Gympie | Tony Perrett | LNP | 7.6 |
| Southport | Rob Molhoek | LNP | 7.8 |
| Moggill | Christian Rowan | LNP | 8.1 |
| Toowoomba South | David Janetzki | LNP | 8.3 |
| Scenic Rim | Jon Krause | LNP | 9.2 |
| Callide | Jeff Seeney | LNP | 9.8 |
Safe
| Kawana | Jarrod Bleijie | LNP | 10.2 |
| Maroochydore | Fiona Simpson | LNP | 10.3 |
| Mermaid Beach | Ray Stevens | LNP | 10.3 |
| Mudgeeraba | Ros Bates | LNP | 10.3 |
| Gregory | Lachlan Millar | LNP | 10.4 |
| Nanango | Deb Frecklington | LNP | 13.3 |
| Warrego | Ann Leahy | LNP | 14.5 |
| Broadwater | Verity Barton | LNP | 16.3 |
| Condamine | Pat Weir | LNP | 17.1 |
| Southern Downs | Lawrence Springborg | LNP | 19.2 |
Very safe
| Surfers Paradise | John-Paul Langbroek | LNP | 20.4 |
Crossbench seats
| Pumicestone | Rick Williams | IND (ALP v LNP) | 0.1 |
| Hill | Shane Knuth | KAP | 4.9 |
| Cairns | Rob Pyne | IND (ALP v LNP) | 7.5 |
| Buderim | Steve Dickson | PHON (LNP v ALP) | 11.8 |
| Traeger | Rob Katter | KAP v LNP | 16.1 |

== See also ==
- Post-election pendulum for the Queensland state election, 2015
