= Electoral results for the district of Pumicestone =

Queensland, Australia, district election results

This is a list of electoral results for the electoral district of Pumicestone in Queensland state elections.

== Members for Pumicestone ==
Member	Party	Term
Carryn Sullivan	Labor	2001–2012
Lisa France	Liberal National	2012–2015
Rick Williams	Labor	2015–2017
Rick Williams	Independent	2017
Simone Wilson	Liberal National	2017–2020
Ali King	Labor	2020–2024
Ariana Doolan	Liberal National	2024–present

== Election results ==
=== Elections in the 2020s ===
2024 Queensland state election: Pumicestone
Party	Candidate	Votes	%	±%
Liberal National	Ariana Doolan	15,230	41.18	+4.78
Labor	Ali King	14,985	40.51	−5.59
One Nation	Samuel Beaton	2,868	7.75	−0.15
Legalise Cannabis	Rosie Doolan	1,647	4.45	+0.25
Greens	Richard Ogden	1,560	4.22	−0.08
Family First	Laine Harth	698	1.89	+1.89
Total formal votes		36,988	96.14	
Informal votes		1,486	3.9	
Turnout		38,474	89.55	
Two-party-preferred result
Liberal National	Ariana Doolan	18,640	50.39	+5.69
Labor	Ali King	18,348	49.61	−5.69
Liberal National gain from Labor		Swing	+5.69	

2020 Queensland state election: Pumicestone
Party	Candidate	Votes	%	±%
Labor	Ali King	15,423	46.13	+10.56
Liberal National	Fiona Gaske	12,150	36.34	+6.46
One Nation	Ross Konowalenko	2,617	7.83	−15.51
Greens	Richard Ogden	1,460	4.37	−0.59
Legalise Cannabis	Ryan Dryden	1,414	4.23	+4.23
United Australia	Steven Newbery	372	1.11	+1.11
Total formal votes		33,436	96.94	+1.11
Informal votes		1,057	3.06	−1.11
Turnout		34,493	90.09	+2.04
Two-party-preferred result
Labor	Ali King	18,480	55.27	+6.11
Liberal National	Fiona Gaske	14,956	44.73	−6.11
Labor gain from Liberal National		Swing	+6.11	

=== Elections in the 2010s ===
2017 Queensland state election: Pumicestone
Party	Candidate	Votes	%	±%
Labor	Michael Hoogwaerts	10,506	35.6	−3.6
Liberal National	Simone Wilson	8,825	29.9	−14.6
One Nation	Greg Fahey	6,894	23.3	+23.3
Greens	Tony Longland	1,464	5.0	−0.6
Independent	Rick Williams	1,347	4.6	+4.6
Independent	Jason Burgess	499	1.7	+1.7
Total formal votes		29,535	95.8	−2.0
Informal votes		1,287	4.2	+2.0
Turnout		30,822	88.1	+2.6
Two-party-preferred result
Liberal National	Simone Wilson	15,015	50.8	+0.7
Labor	Michael Hoogwaerts	14,520	49.2	−0.7
Liberal National hold		Swing	+0.7	

2015 Queensland state election: Pumicestone
Party	Candidate	Votes	%	±%
Liberal National	Lisa France	13,975	42.13	−11.02
Labor	Rick Williams	13,589	40.97	+10.53
Palmer United	Blair Verrier	2,451	7.39	+7.39
Greens	Daniel O'Connell	1,824	5.50	−0.55
Independent	Bevan Collingwood	901	2.72	+2.72
Independent	Denis Johnson	431	1.30	+1.30
Total formal votes		33,171	97.79	+0.10
Informal votes		749	2.21	−0.10
Turnout		33,920	90.24	−1.35
Two-party-preferred result
Labor	Rick Williams	16,166	52.08	+14.15
Liberal National	Lisa France	14,874	47.92	−14.15
Labor gain from Liberal National		Swing	+14.15	

2012 Queensland state election: Pumicestone
Party	Candidate	Votes	%	±%
Liberal National	Lisa France	16,340	53.15	+13.05
Labor	Carryn Sullivan	9,355	30.43	−17.49
Katter's Australian	Brandt King	3,186	10.36	+10.36
Greens	Jenny Fitzgibbon	1,860	6.05	−2.21
Total formal votes		30,741	97.70	−0.12
Informal votes		725	2.30	+0.12
Turnout		31,466	91.59	−0.08
Two-party-preferred result
Liberal National	Lisa France	17,521	62.07	+17.06
Labor	Carryn Sullivan	10,705	37.93	−17.06
Liberal National gain from Labor		Swing	+17.06	

=== Elections in the 2000s ===
2009 Queensland state election: Pumicestone
Party	Candidate	Votes	%	±%
Labor	Carryn Sullivan	13,811	47.9	−1.9
Liberal National	Shane Moon	11,558	40.1	+0.4
Greens	Ian Bell	2,381	8.3	−0.7
Independent	Colin Bishop	592	2.1	+2.1
Independent	Bert Bowden	247	0.9	+0.9
Independent	Paul McGrane	233	0.8	+0.8
Total formal votes		28,822	97.6	
Informal votes		643	2.4	
Turnout		29,465	91.7	
Two-party-preferred result
Labor	Carryn Sullivan	14,939	55.0	−0.5
Liberal National	Shane Moon	12,229	45.0	+0.5
Labor hold		Swing	−0.5	

2006 Queensland state election: Pumicestone
Party	Candidate	Votes	%	±%
Labor	Carryn Sullivan	13,760	50.3	+2.4
Liberal	Shane Moon	10,975	40.1	+3.3
Greens	Lyn Dickinson	2,603	9.5	+3.8
Total formal votes		27,338	97.6	−0.3
Informal votes		663	2.4	+0.3
Turnout		28,001	92.0	−0.4
Two-party-preferred result
Labor	Carryn Sullivan	14,456	55.4	+0.0
Liberal	Shane Moon	11,630	44.6	-0.0
Labor hold		Swing	+0.0	

2004 Queensland state election: Pumicestone
Party	Candidate	Votes	%	±%
Labor	Carryn Sullivan	12,778	47.9	+1.6
Liberal	Pat Daly	9,803	36.8	+19.0
One Nation	Thomas Hobbins	2,564	9.6	−6.5
Greens	Lyn Dickinson	1,513	5.7	+3.2
Total formal votes		26,658	97.9	−0.3
Informal votes		558	2.1	+0.3
Turnout		27,216	92.4	−1.4
Two-party-preferred result
Labor	Carryn Sullivan	13,612	55.4	−10.7
Liberal	Pat Daly	10,945	44.6	+10.7
Labor hold		Swing	−10.7	

2001 Queensland state election: Pumicestone
Party	Candidate	Votes	%	±%
Labor	Carryn Sullivan	11,360	46.3	+5.9
Liberal	Gary Parsons	4,380	17.8	+12.7
One Nation	Wayne Whitney	3,953	16.1	−12.9
City Country Alliance	Bill Feldman	3,805	15.5	+15.5
Greens	Les Shotton	610	2.5	+1.8
Independent	Dennis Rounsefell	453	1.8	+1.8
Total formal votes		24,561	98.2	
Informal votes		439	1.8	
Turnout		25,000	93.8	
Two-party-preferred result
Labor	Carryn Sullivan	12,686	66.1	+16.9
Liberal	Gary Parsons	6,505	33.9	+33.9
Labor gain from One Nation		Swing	+16.9	
