= David Batt =

David Batt may refer to:

- David Batt (politician), Australian politician
- David Sylvian (born David Alan Batt, 1958), English musician
