= Simone Wilson =

Simone Wilson may refer to:

- Simone Wilson (politician), Australian politician
- Monie Love (born Simone Johnson, 1970), English rapper
