= Lisa France =

Australian politician (born 1974)

Member of the Queensland Parliament for Pumicestone
- In office 24 March 2012 – 31 January 2015
- Preceded by: Carryn Sullivan
- Succeeded by: Rick Williams

Assistant Minister for Natural Resources and Mines
- In office 3 April 2012 – 31 January 2015

Personal details
- Born: 8 January 1974 (age 52) Nambour, Queensland, Australia
- Party: Liberal National
- Profession: Environmental Scientist, Real Estate Principal Licensee.

Lisa Nicole France (born 8 January 1974) is an Australian Liberal National politician who was a member of the Legislative Assembly of Queensland for Pumicestone from 2012 to 2015. She was appointed Assistant Minister for Natural Resources and Mines on 3 April 2012.

Parliament of Queensland
Preceded by Carryn Sullivan	Member for Pumicestone; 2012–2015	Succeeded by Rick Williams
