= Australian Workers Party =

- Abbreviation: AWP
- President: Peter Bell
- Secretary: Mark Ptolemy
- Founded: February 2017; 8 years ago
- Ideology: Modern Monetary Theory; Social democracy
- Political position: Centre-left to left-wing
- Colours: Orange and blue
- Slogan: Real people, real voices, real choices

Website
- www.australianworkersparty.org

The Australian Workers Party (AWP) is an Australian political party which registered with the Australian Electoral Commission in February 2017. The party was de-registered on 15 June 2021.

AWP was formed in response to the continual expansion of economic neoliberalism pursued and implemented by successive Australian governments. The party holds that Australia's main political parties both follow neoliberal economic philosophies which have led to unacceptable levels of unemployment, underemployment, workforce casualisation, the deterioration of workers rights, worker exploitation, the emergence of the working poor and inefficient policies affecting Australia's workforce.

Whilst progressive in all of its policy areas and clearly standing for the ideals of "social and economic justice", the party retains its focus on the wellbeing of workers and their families, macroeconomics and rejects neoliberal assertions which have become accepted as mainstream. The party subscribes to the economic branch of Modern Monetary Theory and advocates an economy which prioritises full employment. Notably, the party advocates the implementation of a job guarantee among its policy platform.

== Election results ==
House of Representatives
Election year	No. of overall votes	% of overall vote	No. of overall seats won	+/–
2019	1,676	0.01	0 / 150	▲0
Senate
Election year	No. of overall votes	% of overall vote	No. of seats won	+/–
2019	28,381	0.19	0 / 40	0
