= Michael Brunker (politician) =

Australian politician

Councillor Mike Brunker

Whitsunday Regional Councillor for Division 6
- Incumbent
- Assumed office 19 March 2016
- Preceded by: Andrew Willcox

Mayor of Whitsunday Region
- In office 15 March 2008 – 28 April 2012
- Preceded by: New council
- Succeeded by: Jenny Whitney

Mayor of Bowen Shire
- In office 15 March 1997 – 15 March 2008
- Succeeded by: Council dissolved

Personal details
- Born: Collinsville, Queensland
- Party: Australian Labor Party
- Spouse: Kylie Brunker
- Occupation: Small business owner Coal miner

Michael Raymond "Mike" Brunker served as Whitsunday Regional Councillor for Division 6, a position he held from 2016 to 2024. He previously served as the first mayor of Whitsunday Region from 2008 to 2012, and mayor of the Shire of Bowen for 11 years from 1997 until its amalgamation with Whitsunday Shire in 2008. He was first elected to local government as a Bowen Shire councillor in 1994.

Brunker is a member of the Australian Labor Party and was the endorsed Labor candidate for the 2010 Australian federal election for the Division of Dawson, for the Electoral district of Burdekin at the 2017 Queensland state election and again for the 2020 Queensland state election.
