= Carryn Sullivan =

Australian politician

Member of the Queensland Parliament for Pumicestone
- In office 17 February 2001 – 26 March 2012
- Preceded by: District created
- Succeeded by: Lisa France

Personal details
- Born: Carryn Elizabeth Lill; 6 September 1955 (age 70) Millmerran, Queensland, Australia
- Party: Labor
- Spouse: Jon Sullivan
- Profession: Teacher

Carryn Elizabeth Sullivan (born 6 September 1955) is an Australian politician. Born at Millmerran, she achieved a Bachelor of Education and a diploma in primary school teaching. She was a Caboolture Shire Councillor from 1991 until she retired in 1994, and she was secretary of the Bribie Island branch of the Labor Party. She held the seat of Pumicestone for Labor in Legislative Assembly of Queensland from its creation at the 2001 election until her defeat at the 2012 election.

Her husband, Jon Sullivan, was an MLA for Caboolture from 1992 to 1998, and MP for the federal division of Longman from 2007 to 2010.

Parliament of Queensland
District created	Member for Pumicestone; 2001–2012	Succeeded by Lisa France
