= Jim McDonald (Australian politician) =

Australian politician; Member of the Queensland Legislative Assembly

Jim McDonald MP

Member of the Queensland Legislative Assembly for Lockyer
- Incumbent
- Assumed office 25 November 2017
- Preceded by: Ian Rickuss

Personal details
- Born: 29 May 1967 (age 59) Toowoomba, Queensland
- Party: Liberal National Party

James John McDonald (born 29 May 1967) is an Australian politician. He has been the Liberal National Party member for Lockyer in the Queensland Legislative Assembly since 2017.

Parliament of Queensland
Preceded by Ian Rickuss	Member for Lockyer; 2017–present	Incumbent
