= Charis Mullen =

Australian politician

The Honourable Charis Mullen MP

Member of the Queensland Legislative Assembly for Jordan
- Incumbent
- Assumed office 25 November 2017
- Preceded by: New seat

Shadow Minister for Public Works
- Incumbent
- Assumed office 8 November 2024

Personal details
- Born: 20 February 1974 (age 52)
- Party: Labor
- Education: University of Queensland
- Occupation: Politician, trade unionist
- Website: charismullen.com.au

Charis Mullen (born 20 February 1974) is an Australian politician. She has been the Labor member for Jordan in the Queensland Legislative Assembly since 2017, when the division was created.

Under the Steven Miles government, from 18 December 2023 to 27 October 2024, she served in the cabinet as the Minister for Child Safety, Seniors and Disability Services and Multicultural Affairs. Mullen reported that the multicultural affairs portfolio is something she has always wanted.

As of 8 November 2024, she is the shadow minister of Public Works & Multicultural Affairs.

== Early life ==
Mullen's family relocated to Australia when she was seven years old. Mullen arrived in Australia unable to speak English, requiring rapid immersion into a new linguistic and cultural environment.

Mullen graduated from Brisbane State High School in 1991.

She also graduated from the University of Queensland with a Bachelor of Arts (Communication & Cultural Studies, Media Studies) in 1994. As well as holding a Certificate IV in Frontline Management and Diploma of Superannuation.

Before being elected to Parliament, she was the AWU campaign coordinator for Queensland from 2013 to 2017 until she got elected. In that position, she coordinated union-led campaigns advocating for workers' rights and industrial policy, building networks that supported her transition to electoral politics. Her association with the Australian Worker's Union positions her on the right faction of the Labor party.

Mullen worked across a number of industries including development, transport, infrastructure, mining, gaming, tourism and telecommunications. She is a former senior policy advisor to the Minister for Environment, Local Government and Planning.

== Political career ==
Mullen's political activism began with her candidature for the newly created seat of Jordan in the Queensland Legislative Assembly during the 2017 state election. Mullen campaigned on four key policies – investing in front-line services, delivering on infrastructure, assisting with cost of living and creating more local jobs.

Parliament of Queensland
New seat	Member for Jordan; 2017–present	Incumbent
