= Electoral district of Jordan =

State electoral district of Queensland, Australia

Jordan Queensland—Legislative Assembly
- Map of Jordan, 2017
- State: Queensland
- Dates current: 2017–present
- MP: Charis Mullen
- Party: Labor Party
- Namesake: Vi Jordan
- Electors: 39,041 (2020)
- Area: 314 km^{2} (121.2 sq mi)
- Demographic: Outer-metropolitan
- Coordinates: 27.7470°S 152.9221°E
Electorates around Jordan:
Bundamba	Inala	Algester
Ipswich	Jordan	Logan
Scenic Rim	Scenic Rim	Logan

Jordan is an electoral district of the Legislative Assembly in the Australian state of Queensland. It was created in the 2017 redistribution. It was named after politician Vi Jordan, second female Member of the Queensland Legislative Assembly.

Based on the area between Ipswich and Logan, Jordan consists of the suburbs of Gailes, Carole Park, Camira, Brookwater, Augustine Heights, Springfield, Greenbank, New Beith, Lyons and Undullah.

From results of the 2015 election, Jordan was estimated to be a safe seat for the Labor Party with a margin of 13.5%.

== Members for Jordan ==
Member	Party	Term
Charis Mullen	Labor	2017–present

== Election results ==
2024 Queensland state election: Jordan
Party	Candidate	Votes	%	±%
Labor	Charis Mullen	19,225	48.57	−6.87
Liberal National	Kevin Burns	12,300	31.08	+8.39
Greens	Dung Tran	4,106	10.37	−0.37
One Nation	Sabeh Abou Chahla	2,866	7.24	−3.88
Libertarian	Michael Pucci	1,085	2.74	+2.74
Total formal votes		39,582	95.55	−0.98
Informal votes		1,842	4.45	+0.98
Turnout		41,424	88.98	+0.58
Two-party-preferred result
Labor	Charis Mullen	23,729	59.95	−7.15
Liberal National	Kevin Burns	15,853	40.05	+7.15
Labor hold		Swing	−7.15	

== See also ==
- Electoral districts of Queensland
- Members of the Queensland Legislative Assembly by year
- Category:Members of the Queensland Legislative Assembly by name
