= Rick Williams (Australian politician) =

Australian politician

Member of the Queensland Legislative Assembly for Pumicestone
- In office 31 January 2015 – 25 November 2017
- Preceded by: Lisa France
- Succeeded by: Simone Wilson

Personal details
- Born: Richard Alan Williams
- Party: Independent (2017–present)
- Other political affiliations: Labor (2015–2017)
- Occupation: Financial planner

Richard Alan Williams is an Australian politician. He was a member of the Queensland Legislative Assembly from 2015 until 2017, representing the electorate of Pumicestone. He served for most of his term as a Labor member, but resigned from the party to sit as an independent in October 2017 after being disendorsed as a Labor candidate for the 2017 election. He recontested his seat as an independent, but was unsuccessful.

Williams publicly displayed an anti-abortion stance with regard to reproductive rights, in contrast with the majority of his state ALP colleagues.

On 27 October 2017, Premier Annastacia Palaszczuk instructed the secretary of the state Labor party to disendorse Williams as the party's candidate for the next Queensland state election, following Williams' involvement in a series of controversies regarding his behaviour towards his neighbours and business associates.

Parliament of Queensland
Preceded by Lisa France	Member for Pumicestone; 2015–2017	Succeeded by Simone Wilson
