= Leanne Donaldson =

Australian politician

Minister for Agriculture and Fisheries of Queensland
- In office 8 December 2015 – 3 November 2016
- Premier: Annastacia Palaszczuk
- Preceded by: Bill Byrne
- Succeeded by: Bill Byrne

Member of the Queensland Legislative Assembly for Bundaberg
- In office 31 January 2015 – 25 November 2017
- Preceded by: Jack Dempsey
- Succeeded by: David Batt

Personal details
- Party: Labor

Leanne Elizabeth Donaldson is an Australian politician. She was the Labor member for Bundaberg in the Queensland Legislative Assembly from 2015 to 2017.

On 8 December 2015, Donaldson was sworn in as the Minister for Agriculture and Fisheries in the second Palaszczuk Cabinet, becoming the first woman to serve in this role. She resigned from Cabinet in November 2016 after controversies involving unpaid bills and unregistered driving.

She lost her seat to LNP candidate David Batt at the 2017 election.

Parliament of Queensland
Preceded by Jack Dempsey	Member for Bundaberg; 2015–2017	Succeeded by David Batt
