= Ann Leahy =

Australian politician

The Honourable Ann Leahy MP

Minister for Local Government and Water and Minister for Fire, Disaster Recovery and Volunteers
- Incumbent
- Assumed office 1 November 2024
- Leader: David Crisafulli
- Preceded by: Nikki Boyd (as Minister for Fire, Disaster Recovery) Glenn Butcher (as Minister for Water) Ali King (as Minister for Local Government)

Member of the Queensland Legislative Assembly for Warrego
- Incumbent
- Assumed office 31 January 2015
- Preceded by: Howard Hobbs

Personal details
- Born: 1971 (age 54–55) Stanthorpe, Queensland
- Party: Liberal National Party
- Education: University of Southern Queensland
- Occupation: Stationhand, electorate officer

Ann Leahy (born 8 August 1971) is an Australian politician. She has been the Liberal National Party member for Warrego in the Queensland Legislative Assembly since 2015.

Leahy now serves as Minister for Local Government, Water, Fire, Disaster Recovery and Volunteers, having been elevated to the ministry by Premier David Crisafulli

Prior to her pre-selection for Warrego by the Liberal National Party, Leahy had been the electorate office for her predecessor, Howard Hobbs. In 1998, Hobbs had resigned from the Borbidge government after his wife alleged that he was having an affair with a staffer, who was later revealed to have been Leahy.

Parliament of Queensland
Preceded by Howard Hobbs	Member for Warrego; 2015–present	Incumbent
