= David Batt (politician) =

Australian politician (born 1971)

David Batt MP

Member of the Australian Parliament for Hinkler
- Incumbent
- Assumed office 3 May 2025
- Preceded by: Keith Pitt

Member of the Queensland Legislative Assembly for Bundaberg
- In office 25 November 2017 – 6 October 2020
- Preceded by: Leanne Donaldson
- Succeeded by: Tom Smith

Bundaberg Regional Councillor for Division 8
- In office 15 March 2008 – 25 November 2017
- Preceded by: New division
- Succeeded by: Steve Cooper

Personal details
- Born: 24 June 1971 (age 55) Bundaberg, Queensland, Australia
- Party: Liberal National Party
- Occupation: Police officer
- Website: www.davidbatt.com.au

David John Batt (born 24 June 1971) is an Australian politician. He was the Liberal National Party member for Bundaberg in the Queensland Legislative Assembly from 2017 to 2020.

He was the LNP candidate for Hinkler in the 2025 federal election at which he retained the seat for the LNP.

Prior to his election to Queensland Parliament, Batt served as a member of Bundaberg Regional Council from 2008 to 2017. From 1989 to 2012, he served as a police officer in the Queensland Police Service, reaching the rank of detective sergeant.

Parliament of Queensland
Preceded by Leanne Donaldson	Member for Bundaberg; 2017–2020	Succeeded by Tom Smith
Parliament of Australia
Preceded by Keith Pitt	Member for Hinkler; 2025–present	Incumbent
