= Ali King =

Australian politician

Member of the Queensland Legislative Assembly for Pumicestone
- In office 31 October 2020 – 26 October 2024
- Preceded by: Simone Wilson
- Succeeded by: Ariana Doolan

Personal details
- Born: 6 February 1977 (age 49)
- Party: Labor

Ali-Breeze King (born 6 February 1977) is an Australian politician. She served as the Labor Party member for Pumicestone in the Queensland Legislative Assembly for one term from 2020 until her defeat at the 2024 state election.

She previously stood as the Labor candidate for the seat of Maiwar in the 2017 Queensland state election, but was unsuccessful.

Prior to her election King was mentored by Victorian MP Sonya Kilkenny through EMILY's List.

Parliament of Queensland
Preceded by Simone Wilson	Member for Pumicestone; 2020–2024	Succeeded by Ariana Doolan
