= Coralee O'Rourke =

Australian politician; Member of the Queensland Legislative Assembly

The Honourable Coralee O'Rourke
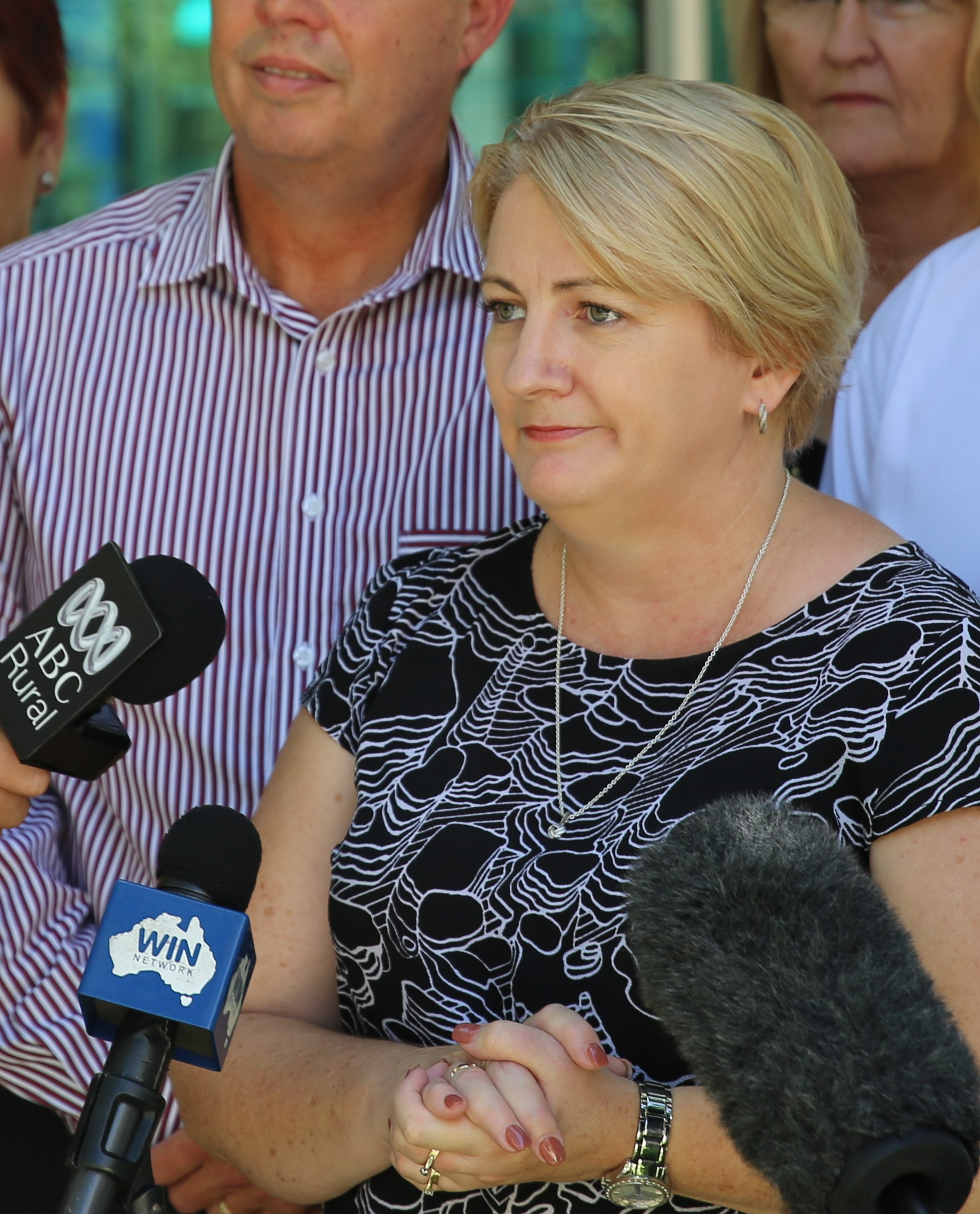

Minister for Disability Services of Queensland
- In office 16 February 2015 – 31 October 2020
- Premier: Annastacia Palaszczuk
- Preceded by: Tracy Davis
- Succeeded by: Craig Crawford

Minister for Seniors of Queensland
- In office 16 February 2015 – 31 October 2020
- Premier: Annastacia Palaszczuk
- Preceded by: Tracy Davis (Communities)
- Succeeded by: Craig Crawford

Minister Assisting the Premier on North Queensland
- In office 16 February 2015 – 31 October 2020
- Premier: Annastacia Palaszczuk

Member of the Queensland Legislative Assembly for Mundingburra
- In office 31 January 2015 – 5 October 2020
- Preceded by: David Crisafulli
- Succeeded by: Les Walker

Personal details
- Party: Labor
- Children: 2
- Education: Queensland University of Technology
- Profession: Early childhood educator

Coralee Jane O'Rourke is a former Australian politician. She was the Labor member for Mundingburra in the Queensland Legislative Assembly from 2015 until retirement in 2020.

== Early life and education ==
O'Rourke attended Queensland University of Technology and completed a bachelor's degree in education (Early Childhood) and was the Director of a community-based early learning centre in Aitkenvale (Townsville) prior to her election to Parliament on 31 January 2015.

== Political career ==
O'Rourke was sworn in as Minister for Disability Services, Minister for Seniors and Minister Assisting the Premier on North Queensland in the Palaszczuk Ministry on 16 February 2015.

She currently lives in Townsville with her husband and their two teenaged children.

On 5 September 2020, O'Rourke announced that she would not be running in the 2020 Queensland election.

== Personal life ==
On 24 October 2018, O'Rourke publicly announced that she had been diagnosed with breast cancer a week earlier.

Parliament of Queensland
Preceded by David Crisafulli	Member for Mundingburra; 2015–2020	Succeeded by Les Walker
