= Simone Wilson (politician) =

Australian politician

Shadow Assistant Minister for Education
- In office 15 December 2017 – 31 October 2020
- Leader: Deb Frecklington
- Preceded by: New Position

Member of the Queensland Legislative Assembly for Pumicestone
- In office 25 November 2017 – 6 October 2020
- Preceded by: Rick Williams
- Succeeded by: Ali King

Personal details
- Born: 20 February 1976 (age 50) Melbourne, Victoria
- Party: Liberal National Party

Simone Marie Wilson (born 20 February 1976) is an Australian politician. She was the Liberal National Party member for Pumicestone in the Queensland Legislative Assembly from 2017 to 2020.

Following her entrance to state parliament, Wilson supported Deb Frecklington in her successful bid to become leader of the LNP and therefore the Opposition. Wilson then joined the LNP front bench as Shadow Assistant Minister for Education, assisting Jarrod Bleijie.

In September 2019 Wilson announced that she would not stand as a candidate at the October 2020 state election.

Parliament of Queensland
Preceded by Rick Williams	Member for Pumicestone; 2017–2020	Succeeded by Ali King
