= Electoral district of Pumicestone =

State electoral district of Queensland, Australia

Pumicestone Queensland—Legislative Assembly
- Electoral map of Pumicestone 2017
- State: Queensland
- Dates current: 2001–present
- MP: Ariana Doolan
- Party: Liberal National
- Namesake: Pumicestone Passage
- Electors: 38,286 (2020)
- Area: 337 km^{2} (130.1 sq mi)
- Demographic: Outer-metropolitan
- Coordinates: 27°3′S 153°3′E
Electorates around Pumicestone:
Glass House	Caloundra	Coral Sea
Glass House	Pumicestone	Coral Sea
Morayfield	Bancroft	Moreton Bay

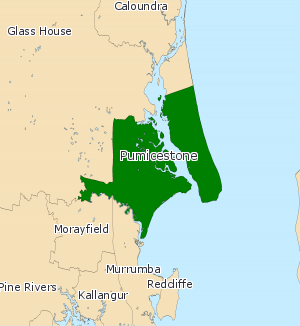
Electoral map of Pumicestone 2008

Pumicestone is an electoral district of the Legislative Assembly in the Australian state of Queensland.

The district was first created for the 2001 state election. Located in the corridor between Brisbane and the Sunshine Coast, it includes the urbanised areas of Bribie Island, as well as parts of Caboolture. It is named after the Pumicestone Channel, the strait which divides Bribie Island from the mainland.

== Members for Pumicestone ==
Member	Party	Term
Carryn Sullivan	Labor	2001–2012
Lisa France	Liberal National	2012–2015
Rick Williams	Labor	2015–2017
Rick Williams	Independent	2017
Simone Wilson	Liberal National	2017–2020
Ali King	Labor	2020–2024
Ariana Doolan	Liberal National	2024–present

== Election results ==
2024 Queensland state election: Pumicestone
Party	Candidate	Votes	%	±%
Liberal National	Ariana Doolan	15,230	41.18	+4.78
Labor	Ali King	14,985	40.51	−5.59
One Nation	Samuel Beaton	2,868	7.75	−0.15
Legalise Cannabis	Rosie Doolan	1,647	4.45	+0.25
Greens	Richard Ogden	1,560	4.22	−0.08
Family First	Laine Harth	698	1.89	+1.89
Total formal votes		36,988	96.14	
Informal votes		1,486	3.9	
Turnout		38,474	89.55	
Two-party-preferred result
Liberal National	Ariana Doolan	18,640	50.39	+5.69
Labor	Ali King	18,348	49.61	−5.69
Liberal National gain from Labor		Swing	+5.69	

Primary vote results in Pumicestone (Parties that have never gotten 5% of the vote are omitted)
Labor
Liberal/Liberal National
Greens
One Nation
City Country Alliance
Katter's Australian
Palmer United/United Australia Party
View source data.
Two-party-preferred vote vote results in Pumicestone View source data.
