= Members of the Queensland Legislative Assembly, 2020–2024 =

- ←2017–2020 2024–2028→

Members of the Queensland Legislative Assembly, 2020–2024

This is a list of members of the 57th Legislative Assembly of Queensland from 2020 to 2024, as elected at the 2020 election held on 31 October 2020.

| Image | Member | Party | District | Region | Term | Notes |
|---|---|---|---|---|---|---|
| | Stephen Andrew | One Nation | Mirani | Central Queensland–Mackay, Isaac and Whitsunday | 2017–2024 | Also known as "Moli Duru Ambae". |
| | Mark Bailey | Labor | Miller | South East Queensland | 2015–present | Minister for Transport and Main Roads (2017–2023) |
| | Ros Bates | Liberal National | Mudgeeraba | South East Queensland | 2009–present | — |
| | Stephen Bennett | Liberal National | Burnett | Wide Bay–Burnett–Central Queensland | 2012–present | — |
| | Michael Berkman | Greens | Maiwar | South East Queensland | 2017–present | — |
| | Jarrod Bleijie | Liberal National | Kawana | South East Queensland | 2009–present | Deputy Leader of the Opposition (since 2022) |
| | Sandy Bolton | Independent | Noosa | South East Queensland | 2017–present | — |
| | Mark Boothman | Liberal National | Theodore | South East Queensland | 2012–present | — |
| | Colin Boyce (Note: Colin Boyce resigned on 29 March 2022 to contest the 2022 federal election. Liberal National candidate Bryson Head was elected to replace him at the resulting by-election on 18 June 2022.) | Liberal National | Callide | Darling Downs–Wide Bay–Burnett–Central Queensland | 2017–2022 | — |
| | Nikki Boyd | Labor | Pine Rivers | South East Queensland | 2015–present | Assistant Minister for Local Government (2020–2022) |
| | Don Brown | Labor | Capalaba | South East Queensland | 2015–2024 | Chief Government Whip (since 2017) |
| | Jonty Bush | Labor | Cooper | South East Queensland | 2020–present | — |
| | Glenn Butcher | Labor | Gladstone | Central Queensland | 2015–present | Minister for Regional Development and Manufacturing and Minister for Water (since 2020) |
| | Amanda Camm | Liberal National | Whitsunday | Mackay, Isaac and Whitsunday | 2020–present | — |
| | Michael Crandon | Liberal National | Coomera | South East Queensland | 2009–present | — |
| | Craig Crawford | Labor | Barron River | Far North Queensland | 2015–2024 | Minister for Seniors and Disability Services (2020–2023); Minister for Aboriginal and Torres Strait Islander Partnerships (2020–2023) |
| | David Crisafulli | Liberal National | Broadwater | South East Queensland | 2012–2015, 2017–present | Leader of the Opposition (since 2020) |
| | Yvette D'Ath | Labor | Redcliffe | South East Queensland | 2014–2024 | Attorney-General of Queensland and Minister for Justice (since 2023); Minister for the Prevention of Family and Domestic Violence (since 2023); Minister for Health and Ambulance Services (2020–2023); Leader of the House (2017–2024) |
| | Nick Dametto | Katter's Australian | Hinchinbrook | North Queensland | 2017–present | — |
| | Mick de Brenni | Labor | Springwood | South East Queensland | 2015–present | Minister for Clean Economy and Jobs (since 2023); Minister for Energy, Renewables and Hydrogen (2020–2023); Minister for Public Works and Procurement (2015–2023) |
| | Cameron Dick | Labor | Woodridge | South East Queensland | 2009–2012, 2015–present | Deputy Premier of Queensland (since 2023); Treasurer and Minister for Trade and Investment (since 2021); Treasurer and Minister for Investment (2020–2021) |
| | Leeanne Enoch | Labor | Algester | South East Queensland | 2015–present | Minister for the Arts (since 2020); Minister for Communities and Housing (2020–2023) |
| | Di Farmer | Labor | Bulimba | South East Queensland | 2009–2012, 2015–present | Minister for Training and Skills Development (since 2020); Minister for Employment and Small Business (since 2020) |
| | Shannon Fentiman | Labor | Waterford | South East Queensland | 2015–present | Minister for Women (since 2020); Attorney-General of Queensland (2020–2023); Minister for Justice (2020–2023); Minister for the Prevention of Domestic and Family Violence (2020–2023); Minister for Health and Ambulance Services (2023) |
| | Deb Frecklington | Liberal National | Nanango | Wide Bay–Burnett | 2012–present | — |
| | Mark Furner | Labor | Ferny Grove | South East Queensland | 2015–present | Minister for Agricultural Industry Development and Fisheries (since 2020) |
| | Laura Gerber | Liberal National | Currumbin | South East Queensland | 2020–present | — |
| | Julieanne Gilbert | Labor | Mackay | Mackay, Isaac and Whitsunday | 2015–2024 | Assistant Minister for Health and Regional Health Infrastructure (2020–2023) |
| | Grace Grace | Labor | McConnel | South East Queensland | 2007–2012, 2015–present | Minister for Industrial Relations (since 2015) Minister for Racing (since 2020) Minister for Education (2017–2023) |
| | Aaron Harper | Labor | Thuringowa | North Queensland | 2015–2024 | — |
| | Michael Hart | Liberal National | Burleigh | South East Queensland | 2012–2024 | — |
| | Bryson Head | Liberal National | Callide | Darling Downs–Wide Bay–Burnett–Central Queensland | 2022–present | — |
| | Michael Healy | Labor | Cairns | Far North Queensland | 2017–present | — |
| | Stirling Hinchliffe | Labor | Sandgate | South East Queensland | 2006–2012, 2015–2024 | Minister Assisting the Premier on Olympics and Paralympics Sport and Engagement (since 2021); Minister for Tourism, Innovation and Sport (since 2021); Minister for Sport (2020–2021); Minister for Tourism Industry Development and Innovation (2020–2021) |
| | Jennifer Howard | Labor | Ipswich | South East Queensland | 2015–present | — |
| | Jason Hunt | Labor | Caloundra | South East Queensland | 2020–2024 | — |
| | David Janetzki | Liberal National | Toowoomba South | Darling Downs | 2016–present | Deputy Leader of the Opposition (2020–2022) |
| | Robbie Katter | Katter's Australian | Traeger | Far North Queensland–North Queensland | 2012–present | — |
| | Joe Kelly | Labor | Greenslopes | South East Queensland | 2015–present | Deputy Speaker of the Legislative Assembly of Queensland (since 2020) |
| | Ali King | Labor | Pumicestone | South East Queensland | 2020–2024 | — |
| | Shane King | Labor | Kurwongbah | South East Queensland | 2015–present | — |
| | Shane Knuth | Katter's Australian | Hill | Far North Queensland | 2004–present | — |
| | Jon Krause | Liberal National | Scenic Rim | South East Queensland | 2012–present | — |
| | John-Paul Langbroek | Liberal National | Surfers Paradise | South East Queensland | 2004–present | — |
| | Dale Last | Liberal National | Burdekin | Mackay, Isaac and Whitsunday | 2015–present | — |
| | Brittany Lauga | Labor | Keppel | Central Queensland | 2015–2024 | — |
| | Ann Leahy | Liberal National | Warrego | Darling Downs | 2015–present | — |
| | Leanne Linard | Labor | Nudgee | South East Queensland | 2015–present | Minister for the Environment and the Great Barrier Reef (2023–present); Minister for Science and Innovation (2023–present); Minister for Children and Youth Justice (2020–2023); Minister for Multicultural Affairs (2020–2023); Minister for Science (2023) |
| | James Lister | Liberal National | Southern Downs | Darling Downs | 2017–present | — |
| | Cynthia Lui | Labor | Cook | Far North Queensland | 2017–2024 | — |
| | Amy MacMahon | Greens | South Brisbane | South East Queensland | 2020–2024 | — |
| | Jim Madden (Note: Jim Madden, member for Ipswich West resigned in January 2024 to contest the Ipswich council election. Liberal National candidate Darren Zanow was elected to replace him at the subsequent by-election.) | Labor | Ipswich West | South East Queensland | 2015–2024 | — |
| | Tim Mander | Liberal National | Everton | South East Queensland | 2012–present | — |
| | James Martin (Note: Duncan Pegg, member for Stretton, announced his resignation to undergo cancer treatment on 22 April 2021, but had not formally resigned at the time of his death on 10 June 2021. Labor candidate James Martin was elected to replace him at the subsequent by-election on 24 July 2021.) | Labor | Stretton | South East Queensland | 2021–present | — |
| | Lance McCallum | Labor | Bundamba | South East Queensland | 2020–present | — |
| | Jim McDonald | Liberal National | Lockyer | South East Queensland | 2017–present | — |
| | Melissa McMahon | Labor | Macalister | South East Queensland | 2017–present | — |
| | Corrine McMillan | Labor | Mansfield | South East Queensland | 2017–present | — |
| | Bart Mellish | Labor | Aspley | South East Queensland | 2017–present | Minister for Transport and Main Roads (since 2023) Minister for Digital Services (since 2023) |
| | Brent Mickelberg | Liberal National | Buderim | South East Queensland | 2017–present | — |
| | Steven Miles | Labor | Murrumba | South East Queensland | 2015–present | Premier of Queensland (since 2023); Deputy Premier of Queensland (2020–2023); Minister Assisting the Premier on Olympic and Paralympic Games Infrastructure (2022–2023); Minister for State Development, Infrastructure, Local Government and Planning (2020–2023); Minister Assisting the Premier on Olympics Infrastructure (2021–2022) |
| | Lachlan Millar | Liberal National | Gregory | Central Queensland | 2015–present | — |
| | Steve Minnikin | Liberal National | Chatsworth | South East Queensland | 2012–present | — |
| | Rob Molhoek | Liberal National | Southport | South East Queensland | 2012–present | — |
| | Charis Mullen | Labor | Jordan | South East Queensland | 2017–present | — |
| | Tim Nicholls | Liberal National | Clayfield | South East Queensland | 2006–present | — |
| | Margie Nightingale (Note: Annastacia Palaszczuk, Premier and member for Inala resigned from the Assembly in December 2023. Labor candidate Margie Nightingale was elected to replace her at the subsequent by-election.) | Labor | Inala | South East Queensland | 2024–present | — |
| | Sam O'Connor | Liberal National | Bonney | South East Queensland | 2017–present | — |
| | Barry O'Rourke | Labor | Rockhampton | Central Queensland | 2017–2024 | — |
| | Annastacia Palaszczuk | Labor | Inala | South East Queensland | 2006–2023 | Premier of Queensland (2015–2023); Minister for the Olympic and Paralympic Games (2022–2023); Minister for the Olympics (2021–2022); Minister for Trade (2017–2021) |
| | Joan Pease | Labor | Lytton | South East Queensland | 2015–present | Senior Government Whip (since 2017) |
| | Duncan Pegg | Labor | Stretton | South East Queensland | 2015–2021 | — |
| | Tony Perrett | Liberal National | Gympie | Wide Bay–Burnett | 2015–present | — |
| | Curtis Pitt | Labor | Mulgrave | Far North Queensland | 2009–2024 | Speaker of the Legislative Assembly of Queensland (since 2018) |
| | Andrew Powell | Liberal National | Glass House | South East Queensland | 2009–present | Manager of Opposition Business in the House (since 2022) |
| | Linus Power | Labor | Logan | South East Queensland | 2015–present | — |
| | Jess Pugh | Labor | Mount Ommaney | South East Queensland | 2017–present | Deputy Government Whip (since 2020) |
| | Dan Purdie | Liberal National | Ninderry | South East Queensland | 2017–present | — |
| | Kim Richards | Labor | Redlands | South East Queensland | 2017–2024 | — |
| | Mark Robinson | Liberal National | Oodgeroo | South East Queensland | 2009–2024 | — |
| | Christian Rowan | Liberal National | Moggill | South East Queensland | 2015–present | — |
| | Peter Russo | Labor | Toohey | South East Queensland | 2015–present | — |
| | Mark Ryan | Labor | Morayfield | South East Queensland | 2009–2012, 2015–present | Minister for Fire and Emergency Services (2020–2023); Minister for Police and Corrective Services (2016–2023) |
| | Bruce Saunders | Labor | Maryborough | Wide Bay–Burnett | 2015–present | — |
| | Meaghan Scanlon | Labor | Gaven | South East Queensland | 2017–present | Minister for Housing, Local Government and Planning (since 2023); Minister for Public Works (since 2023); Minister for Housing (2023); Minister for Science and Youth Affairs (2020–2023); Minister for the Environment and the Great Barrier Reef (2020–2023) |
| | Fiona Simpson | Liberal National | Maroochydore | South East Queensland | 1992–present | — |
| | Robert Skelton | Labor | Nicklin | South East Queensland | 2020–2024 | — |
| | Tom Smith | Labor | Bundaberg | Wide Bay–Burnett | 2020–present | — |
| | Ray Stevens | Liberal National | Mermaid Beach | South East Queensland | 2006–present | — |
| | Scott Stewart | Labor | Townsville | North Queensland | 2015–2024 | Minister for Resources and Critical Development (since 2023) Minister for Resources (2020–2023) |
| | Jimmy Sullivan | Labor | Stafford | South East Queensland | 2020–present | — |
| | Adrian Tantari | Labor | Hervey Bay | Wide Bay–Burnett | 2020–2024 | — |
| | Les Walker | Labor | Mundingburra | North Queensland | 2020–2024 | — |
| | Trevor Watts | Liberal National | Toowoomba North | Darling Downs | 2012–present | — |
| | Pat Weir | Liberal National | Condamine | Darling Downs | 2015–present | — |
| | Chris Whiting | Labor | Bancroft | South East Queensland | 2015–present | — |
| | Darren Zanow | Liberal National | Ipswich West | South East Queensland | 2024–2024 | — |
