= Post-election pendulum for the 2020 Queensland state election =

The following is a Mackerras pendulum for the 2020 Queensland state election.

"Safe" seats require a swing of over 10 per cent to change, "fairly safe" seats require a swing of between 6 and 10 per cent, while "marginal" seats require a swing of less than 6 per cent.

Labor seats (52)
Marginal
Bundaberg	Tom Smith	ALP	0.01
Nicklin	Robert Skelton	ALP	0.1
Hervey Bay	Adrian Tantari	ALP	2.0
Caloundra	Jason Hunt	ALP	2.5
Barron River	Craig Crawford	ALP	3.1
Townsville	Scott Stewart	ALP	3.1
Thuringowa	Aaron Harper	ALP	3.2
Redlands	Kim Richards	ALP	3.9
Mundingburra	Les Walker	ALP	3.9
Aspley	Bart Mellish	ALP	5.2
Pumicestone	Ali King	ALP	5.3
Cairns	Michael Healy	ALP	5.6
Keppel	Brittany Lauga	ALP	5.6
Fairly safe
Redcliffe	Yvette D'Ath	ALP	6.1
Cook	Cynthia Lui	ALP	6.3
Pine Rivers	Nikki Boyd	ALP	6.7
Mackay	Julieanne Gilbert	ALP	6.7
Mansfield	Corrine McMillan	ALP	6.8
Gaven	Meaghan Scanlon	ALP	7.8
Springwood	Mick de Brenni	ALP	8.3
Rockhampton	Barry O'Rourke	ALP	8.6
Macalister	Melissa McMahon	ALP	9.5
Capalaba	Don Brown	ALP	9.8
Safe
Cooper	Jonty Bush	ALP	10.5
Ferny Grove	Mark Furner	ALP	11.0
McConnel	Grace Grace	ALP	11.1
Murrumba	Steven Miles	ALP	11.3
Bulimba	Di Farmer	ALP	11.4
Stafford	Jimmy Sullivan	ALP	11.9
Maryborough	Bruce Saunders	ALP	11.9
Mulgrave	Curtis Pitt	ALP	12.2
Mount Ommaney	Jess Pugh	ALP	12.6
Bancroft	Chris Whiting	ALP	12.8
Kurwongbah	Shane King	ALP	13.1
Greenslopes	Joe Kelly	ALP	13.2
Lytton	Joan Pease	ALP	13.4
Logan	Linus Power	ALP	13.4
Miller	Mark Bailey	ALP	13.8
Ipswich West	Jim Madden	ALP	14.3
Toohey	Peter Russo	ALP	14.5
Stretton	Duncan Pegg	ALP	14.8
Nudgee	Leanne Linard	ALP	15.1
Waterford	Shannon Fentiman	ALP	16.0
Ipswich	Jennifer Howard	ALP	16.5
Morayfield	Mark Ryan	ALP	16.7
Jordan	Charis Mullen	ALP	17.1
Sandgate	Stirling Hinchliffe	ALP	17.3
Algester	Leeanne Enoch	ALP	17.8
Bundamba	Lance McCallum	ALP	20.7 v ONP
Gladstone	Glenn Butcher	ALP	23.5
Woodridge	Cameron Dick	ALP	26.2
Inala	Annastacia Palaszczuk	ALP	28.2

Liberal National seats (34)
Marginal
Currumbin	Laura Gerber	LNP	0.5
Coomera	Michael Crandon	LNP	1.1
Burleigh	Michael Hart	LNP	1.2
Chatsworth	Steve Minnikin	LNP	1.3
Clayfield	Tim Nicholls	LNP	1.6
Glass House	Andrew Powell	LNP	1.6
Everton	Tim Mander	LNP	2.2
Whitsunday	Amanda Camm	LNP	3.3
Theodore	Mark Boothman	LNP	3.3
Moggill	Christian Rowan	LNP	3.6
Ninderry	Dan Purdie	LNP	4.1
Mermaid Beach	Ray Stevens	LNP	4.4
Oodgeroo	Mark Robinson	LNP	4.5
Buderim	Brent Mickelberg	LNP	5.3
Southport	Rob Molhoek	LNP	5.4
Fairly safe
Burdekin	Dale Last	LNP	7.0
Toowoomba North	Trevor Watts	LNP	7.3
Gympie	Tony Perrett	LNP	8.5
Maroochydore	Fiona Simpson	LNP	9.1
Kawana	Jarrod Bleijie	LNP	9.3
Safe
Bonney	Sam O'Connor	LNP	10.1
Mudgeeraba	Ros Bates	LNP	10.1
Toowoomba South	David Janetzki	LNP	10.2
Burnett	Stephen Bennett	LNP	10.8
Scenic Rim	Jon Krause	LNP	11.5
Lockyer	Jim McDonald	LNP	11.5
Nanango	Deb Frecklington	LNP	12.2
Southern Downs	James Lister	LNP	14.1
Callide	Colin Boyce	LNP	15.8
Surfers Paradise	John-Paul Langbroek	LNP	16.2
Broadwater	David Crisafulli	LNP	16.6
Gregory	Lachlan Millar	LNP	17.2
Condamine	Pat Weir	LNP	19.2
Warrego	Ann Leahy	LNP	23.1
Crossbench seats (7)
South Brisbane	Amy MacMahon	GRN	5.3 v ALP
Maiwar	Michael Berkman	GRN	6.3 v LNP
Mirani	Stephen Andrew	ONP	9.0 v ALP
Hinchinbrook	Nick Dametto	KAP	14.8 v LNP
Noosa	Sandy Bolton	IND	15.8 v LNP
Hill	Shane Knuth	KAP	22.5 v ALP
Traeger	Robbie Katter	KAP	24.7 v ALP
