= Members of the Queensland Legislative Assembly, 2017–2020 =

- ←2012–2015 2020–2024→

Members of the Queensland Legislative Assembly, 2017–2020

This is a list of members of the 56th Legislative Assembly of Queensland from 2017 to 2020, as elected at the 2017 election held on 25 November 2017.

Name	Party	District	Term
Stephen Andrew	One Nation	Mirani	2017–present
Hon Mark Bailey	Labor	Miller	2015–present
Ros Bates	LNP	Mudgeeraba	2009–present
David Batt	LNP	Bundaberg	2017–2020
Stephen Bennett	LNP	Burnett	2012–present
Michael Berkman	Greens	Maiwar	2017–present
Jarrod Bleijie	LNP	Kawana	2009–present
Sandy Bolton	Independent	Noosa	2017–present
Mark Boothman	LNP	Theodore	2012–present
Colin Boyce	LNP	Callide	2017–2022
Nikki Boyd	Labor	Pine Rivers	2015–present
Don Brown	Labor	Capalaba	2015–present
Glenn Butcher	Labor	Gladstone	2015–present
Jason Costigan	LNP/Independent/North Queensland First^{[1]}	Whitsunday	2012–2020
Michael Crandon	LNP	Coomera	2009–present
Craig Crawford	Labor	Barron River	2015–present
David Crisafulli	LNP	Broadwater	2012–2015, 2017–present
Hon Yvette D'Ath	Labor	Redcliffe	2014–present
Nick Dametto	KAP	Hinchinbrook	2017–present
Hon Mick de Brenni	Labor	Springwood	2015–present
Hon Cameron Dick	Labor	Woodridge	2009–2012, 2015–present
Hon Leeanne Enoch	Labor	Algester	2015–present
Hon Di Farmer	Labor	Bulimba	2009–2012, 2015–present
Hon Shannon Fentiman	Labor	Waterford	2015–present
Deb Frecklington	LNP	Nanango	2012–present
Hon Mark Furner	Labor	Ferny Grove	2015–present
Laura Gerber^{[2]}	LNP	Currumbin	2020–present
Julieanne Gilbert	Labor	Mackay	2015–present
Hon Grace Grace	Labor	McConnel	2007–2012, 2015–present
Aaron Harper	Labor	Thuringowa	2015–present
Michael Hart	LNP	Burleigh	2012–present
Michael Healy	Labor	Cairns	2017–present
Hon Stirling Hinchliffe	Labor	Sandgate	2006–2012, 2015–present
Jennifer Howard	Labor	Ipswich	2015–present
Marty Hunt	LNP	Nicklin	2017–2020
David Janetzki	LNP	Toowoomba South	2016–present
Hon Kate Jones	Labor	Cooper	2006–2012, 2015–2020
Robbie Katter	KAP	Traeger	2012–present
Joe Kelly	Labor	Greenslopes	2015–present
Shane King	Labor	Kurwongbah	2015–present
Shane Knuth	KAP	Hill	2004–present
Jon Krause	LNP	Scenic Rim	2012–present
John-Paul Langbroek	LNP	Surfers Paradise	2004–present
Dale Last	LNP	Burdekin	2015–present
Brittany Lauga	Labor	Keppel	2015–present
Ann Leahy	LNP	Warrego	2015–present
Leanne Linard	Labor	Nudgee	2015–present
James Lister	LNP	Southern Downs	2017–present
Cynthia Lui	Labor	Cook	2017–present
Hon Dr Anthony Lynham	Labor	Stafford	2014–2020
Jim Madden	Labor	Ipswich West	2015–present
Tim Mander	LNP	Everton	2012–present
Mark McArdle	LNP	Caloundra	2004–2020
Lance McCallum^{[3]}	Labor	Bundamba	2020–present
Jim McDonald	LNP	Lockyer	2017–present
Melissa McMahon	Labor	Macalister	2017–present
Corrine McMillan	Labor	Mansfield	2017–present
Bart Mellish	Labor	Aspley	2017–present
Brent Mickelberg	LNP	Buderim	2017–present
Hon Steven Miles	Labor	Murrumba	2015–present
Lachlan Millar	LNP	Gregory	2015–present
Jo-Ann Miller^{[3]}	Labor	Bundamba	2000–2020
Steve Minnikin	LNP	Chatsworth	2012–present
Rob Molhoek	LNP	Southport	2012–present
Charis Mullen	Labor	Jordan	2017–present
Tim Nicholls	LNP	Clayfield	2006–present
Sam O'Connor	LNP	Bonney	2017–present
Barry O'Rourke	Labor	Rockhampton	2017–present
Hon Coralee O'Rourke	Labor	Mundingburra	2015–2020
Hon Annastacia Palaszczuk	Labor	Inala	2006–present
Joan Pease	Labor	Lytton	2015–present
Duncan Pegg	Labor	Stretton	2015–2021
Tony Perrett	LNP	Gympie	2015–present
Hon Curtis Pitt	Labor	Mulgrave	2009–present
Andrew Powell	LNP	Glass House	2009–present
Linus Power	Labor	Logan	2015–present
Jess Pugh	Labor	Mount Ommaney	2017–present
Dan Purdie	LNP	Ninderry	2017–present
Kim Richards	Labor	Redlands	2017–present
Mark Robinson	LNP	Oodgeroo	2009–present
Dr Christian Rowan	LNP	Moggill	2015–present
Peter Russo	Labor	Toohey	2015–present
Hon Mark Ryan	Labor	Morayfield	2009–2012, 2015–present
Bruce Saunders	Labor	Maryborough	2015–present
Meaghan Scanlon	Labor	Gaven	2017–present
Fiona Simpson	LNP	Maroochydore	1992–present
Ted Sorensen	LNP	Hervey Bay	2009–2020
Ray Stevens	LNP	Mermaid Beach	2006–present
Scott Stewart	Labor	Townsville	2015–present
Jann Stuckey^{[2]}	LNP	Currumbin	2004–2020
Hon Jackie Trad	Labor	South Brisbane	2012–2020
Trevor Watts	LNP	Toowoomba North	2012–present
Pat Weir	LNP	Condamine	2015–present
Chris Whiting	Labor	Bancroft	2015–present
Simone Wilson	LNP	Pumicestone	2017–2020

^{1} The LNP member for Whitsunday, Jason Costigan, was expelled from the party on 1 February 2019. He sat as an independent until forming North Queensland First on 31 October 2019.
^{2} The LNP member for Currumbin, Jann Stuckey, resigned on 1 February 2020. LNP candidate Laura Gerber was elected as her replacement at a by-election on 28 March 2020.
^{3} The Labor member for Bundamba, Jo-Ann Miller, resigned on 20 February 2020. Labor candidate Lance McCallum was elected as her replacement at a by-election on 28 March 2020.
