= 57th Parliament of Queensland =

Meeting of the Legislative Assembly of Queensland

←	56th	58th	→

Overview
- Legislative body: Queensland Legislature
- Meeting place: Parliament House, Brisbane
- Term: 24 November 2020 – 1 October 2024
- Election: 2020
- Government: Labor
- Opposition: Liberal National
- Website: www.parliament.qld.gov.au

Legislative Assembly
- Members: 93
- Speaker: Curtis Pitt (Note: Beginning 16 May 2023, Curtis Pitt took leave. Deputy Speaker, Joe Kelly, was acting speaker for the duration of Pitt's leave. On 23 May 2023, Acting Speaker Kelly appointed Cynthia Lui (member for Cook) to be his acting deputy throughout his tenure as speaker. Pitt returned as Speaker on 12 September 2023.); Joe Kelly (Acting: 16 May – 12 September 2023)
- Deputy Speaker: Joe Kelly (from 26 November 2020); Cynthia Lui (Acting: 23 May – 12 September 2023)
- House Leader: Yvette D'Ath (until 2024); Mick de Brenni (2024)
- Party control: Labor (51) (Note: In January 2024, MP for Ipswich West, Jim Madden (Labor), resigned his seat to stand for the Ipswich City Council. In March 2024 the seat was won by the Liberal National candidate, Darren Zanow, at the Ipswich West by-election. The Labor Party's seat total dropped from 52 to 51.)

The 57th Parliament of Queensland was the most recent meeting of the unicameral chamber of the Queensland Parliament known as the Legislative Assembly. The 2020 state election gave the Labor Party a majority in parliament, winning 52 of 93 seats (55.91%). The First day of the opening of the 57th Parliament of Queensland was 24 November 2020.

== Major events and legislation ==
=== 2021 ===
- In May 2021, following a three-year Queensland Law Reform Commission (QLRC) report on the legal framework of assisted suicide, Premier Annastacia Palaszczuk's government introduced the Voluntary Assisted Dying Act 2021 (introduced by Minister for Health and Ambulance Services, Yvette D'Ath), which would legalise voluntary assisted dying (VAD). The bill sat in parliamentary committee's for 121 days before being read a third time. The bill was discussed extensively (over three days) and received criticism and reservations from many MPs, including Labor member for Logan, Linus Power. The bill passed 61–30, receiving royal assent on 26 September 2021. Upon the bill's succession through parliament, marches and rallies began, calling for the proposed legislation to be terminated. The bill did not come into effect until 1 January 2023.

=== 2023 ===
- On 30 March 2023, a bill, colloquially known as Jack's Law (Police Powers and Responsibilities (Jack's Law) Amendment Bill 2022) after Jack Beasley, whom was stabbed to death in 2019, passed through Parliament. The new legislation gives powers to the Queensland Police Service (QPS) to randomly stop and search people for knives and other weapons on public transport and in Safe Night Precincts across Queensland. Using hand-held metal detectors, the legislation allows Queensland Police Service (QPS) to stop and search anyone within the aforementioned areas. The law came into place following a lengthy trial on the Gold Coast. The new legislation was criticised by the Queensland Council for Civil Liberties (QCCL) (44 days after its initial introduction into parliament), whom stated: "This legislation authorizes mass, suspicion less, warrantless magnetometer searches." Adding: "The traditional requirement that before a search can proceed there must be a reasonable suspicion that a crime has been committed or a weapon found is a bulwark protection of our liberty. Such a requirement is essential to being able to prevent arbitrary searches or searches based on bias. The granting of such powers will inevitably result in unwarranted invasions of privacy."
- On 2 December 2022, the Attorney-General and Minister for Women, Shannon Fentiman, introduced the Births, Deaths and Marriages Registration Bill 2022 (BDMR Bill), later titled the Births, Deaths and Marriages Registration Act 2023 (BDMR Act), into Parliament. The bill, if passed, would give residents of Queensland (cited as trans and gender diverse people) the ability to formally register the change of their sex without the requirement of undergoing sexual reassignment surgery, alongside other reforms. The legislation in place at the time of the introduction of the BDMR Bill allowed for the change of sex on birth certificates if a statutory declaration provided from two medical practitioners verified one had undergone "sexual reassignment" surgery. Fentiman told The Courier-Mail that the current laws in place “unnecessarily medicalises the recognition of a person's lived identity.” Following the bills introduction into parliament, it was referred to the "Legal Affairs and Safety Committee" for consideration, and heard from various organisations, including the Queensland Human Rights Commission (QHRC), Queensland Law Society (QLS), Queensland Family and Child Commission, Women's Forum Australia and the Australian Christian Lobby (ACL). The bill passed through the committee process in April (128 days after its introduction). On 14 June 2023 the BDMR Bill passed 50–34, with the approval of both Greens MPs. Following the passing of the bill, New South Wales became the only remaining Australian state or territory that had not implemented any legislative gender self-identification reforms, like the requirement for gender-affirming surgery.

== Leadership ==
=== Speaker ===
Legislative Assembly Speaker

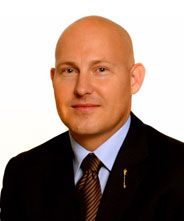
Curtis Pitt (Labor)

The incumbent Speaker and member for Mulgrave, Curtis Pitt, was re-elected as Speaker following the opening of Parliament on 24 November 2020. He defeated the Liberal National's candidate Ray Stevens in a two-way contest.

Speaker election
Candidate	Seat & Region		Votes	%
Curtis Pitt	Mulgrave	Far North Queensland	59	63.44
Ray Stevens	Mermaid Beach	South East Queensland	34	36.56
Total			93	100

=== Deputy Speaker ===
The member for Greenslopes, Joe Kelly, was appointed as Deputy Speaker on the third "House Sitting Date" following the opening of the new session of Parliament. From 16 May to 12 September 2023 Speaker Curtis Pitt took paid leave. Joe Kelly, then-Deputy Speaker, took on the speakership position during that period with Labor MP for Cook Cynthia Lui becoming acting Deputy Speaker.

=== Leader of the House ===
Member for Redcliffe and Attorney-General Yvette D'Ath assumed the position of Leader of the House in 2017, having maintained the position consistently ever since.

== Regional parliament ==
Starting in 2002, the Queensland Legislative Assembly has held occasional "regional sittings," also known as "regional parliaments," in regional areas across the state. Between 8–12 May 2023 (sixth regional sitting), the regional parliament was held in the Far North Queensland city of Cairns for the second time, hosted at the Cairns Convention Centre. The previous regional sitting of Queensland Parliament was 3–5 September 2019 in the North Queensland city of Townsville.

== Party summary ==
Membership (as of 24 November 2020) 2 Greens 52 Labor Liberal National 34 Katter's Australian 3 1 Independent 1 One Nation

Affiliation	Party (shading shows control)							Total	Vacant
Affiliation	QG	IND	KAP	QLP	LNP	NQF	ON	Total	Vacant
End of previous Parliament	1	1	3	48	38	1	1	93	0
Begin (24 November 2020)	2	1	3	52	34	—N/a	1	93	0
Ipswich West by-election (16 March 2024)	2	1	3	51	35	—N/a	1	93	0
One Nation candidate disendorsement (2 August 2024)	2	2	3	51	35	—N/a	—N/a	93	0
Latest voting share %	2.15	2.15	3.23	54.84	37.63	—N/a	—N/a	100	

== Members ==
=== South East Queensland ===
▌ Leeanne Enoch (QLP—Algester)
▌ Bart Mellish (QLP—Aspley)
▌ Chris Whiting (QLP—Bancroft)
▌ Sam O'Connor (LNP—Bonney)
▌ David Crisafulli (LNP—Broadwater)
▌ Brent Mickelberg (LNP—Buderim)
▌ Di Farmer (QLP—Bulimba)
▌ Lance McCallum (QLP—Bundamba)
▌ Michael Hart (LNP—Burleigh)
▌ Jason Hunt (QLP—Caloundra)
▌ Don Brown (QLP—Capalaba)
▌ Steve Minnikin (LNP—Chatsworth)
▌ Tim Nicholls (LNP—Clayfield)
▌ Michael Crandon (LNP—Coomera)
▌ Jonty Bush (QLP—Cooper)
▌ Laura Gerber (LNP—Currumbin)
▌ Tim Mander (LNP—Everton)
▌ Mark Furner (QLP—Ferny Grove)
▌ Meaghan Scanlon (QLP—Gaven)
▌ Andrew Powell (LNP—Glass House)
▌ Joe Kelly (QLP—Greenslopes)
▌ Annastacia Palaszczuk (QLP—Inala)
▌ Jennifer Howard (QLP—Ipswich)
▌ Darren Zanow (LNP—Ipswich West)
▌ Charis Mullen (QLP—Jordan)
▌ Jarrod Bleijie (LNP—Kawana)
▌ Shane King (QLP—Kurwongbah)
▌ Jim McDonald (LNP—Lockyer)
▌ Linus Power (QLP—Logan)
▌ Joan Pease (QLP—Lytton)
▌ Melissa McMahon (QLP—Macalister)
▌ Michael Berkman (QG—Maiwar)
▌ Corrine McMillan (QLP—Mansfield)
▌ Fiona Simpson (LNP—Maroochydore)
▌ Grace Grace (QLP—McConnel)
▌ Ray Stevens (LNP—Mermaid Beach)
▌ Mark Bailey (QLP—Miller)
▌ Christian Rowan (LNP—Moggill)
▌ Mark Ryan (QLP—Morayfield)
▌ Jess Pugh (QLP—Mount Ommaney)
▌ Ros Bates (LNP—Mudgeeraba)
▌ Steven Miles (QLP—Murrumba)
▌ Robert Skelton (QLP—Nicklin)
▌ Dan Purdie (LNP—Ninderry)
▌ Sandy Bolton (IND—Noosa)
▌ Leanne Linard (QLP—Nudgee)
▌ Mark Robinson (LNP—Oodgeroo)
▌ Nikki Boyd (QLP—Pine Rivers)
▌ Ali King (QLP—Pumicestone)
▌ Yvette D'Ath (QLP—Redcliffe)
▌ Kim Richards (QLP—Redlands)
▌ Stirling Hinchliffe (QLP—Sandgate)
▌ Jon Krause (LNP—Scenic Rim)
▌ Amy MacMahon (QG—South Brisbane)
▌ Rob Molhoek (LNP—Southport)
▌ Mick de Brenni (QLP—Springwood)
▌ Jimmy Sullivan (QLP—Stafford)
▌ James Martin (QLP—Stretton)
▌ John-Paul Langbroek (LNP—Surfers Paradise)
▌ Mark Boothman (LNP—Theodore)
▌ Peter Russo (QLP—Toohey)
▌ Shannon Fentiman (QLP—Waterford)
▌ Cameron Dick (QLP—Woodridge)

=== Central Queensland ===
▌ Glenn Butcher (QLP—Gladstone)
▌ Lachlan Millar (LNP—Gregory)
▌ Brittany Lauga (QLP—Keppel)
▌ Barry O'Rourke (QLP—Rockhampton)

=== Central Queensland–Mackay, Isaac and Whitsunday ===
▌ Stephen Andrew (PHON—Mirani)

=== Darling Downs ===
▌ Pat Weir (LNP—Condamine)
▌ James Lister (LNP—Southern Downs)
▌ Trevor Watts (LNP—Toowoomba North)
▌ David Janetzki (LNP—Toowoomba South)
▌ Ann Leahy (LNP—Warrego)

=== Darling Downs–Wide Bay–Burnett–Central Queensland ===
▌ Bryson Head (LNP—Callide)

=== Far North Queensland ===
▌ Craig Crawford (QLP—Barron River)
▌ Michael Healy (QLP—Cairns)
▌ Cynthia Lui (QLP—Cook)
▌ Shane Knuth (KAP—Hill)
▌ Curtis Pitt (QLP—Mulgrave)

=== Far North Queensland–North Queensland ===
▌ Robbie Katter (KAP—Traeger)

=== Mackay, Isaac and Whitsunday ===
▌ Dale Last (LNP—Burdekin)
▌ Julieanne Gilbert (QLP—Mackay)
▌ Amanda Camm (LNP—Whitsunday)

=== North Queensland ===
▌ Nick Dametto (KAP—Hinchinbrook)
▌ Les Walker (QLP—Mundingburra)
▌ Aaron Harper (QLP—Thuringowa)
▌ Scott Stewart (QLP—Townsville)

=== Wide Bay–Burnett ===
▌ Tom Smith (QLP—Bundaberg)
▌ Tony Perrett (LNP—Gympie)
▌ Adrian Tantari (QLP—Hervey Bay)
▌ Bruce Saunders (QLP—Maryborough)
▌ Deb Frecklington (LNP—Nanango)

=== Wide Bay–Burnett–Central Queensland ===
▌ Stephen Bennett (LNP—Burnett)

Map of results by electorate.
