= Miles ministry =

Ministry of the Government of Queensland (2023–2024)

- 42nd Cabinet of Queensland

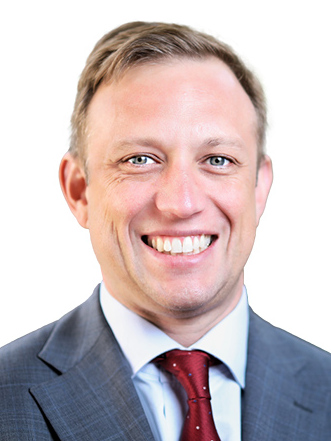
- Steven Miles (Premier)
- Date formed: 15 December 2023
- Date dissolved: 28 October 2024

People and organisations
- Monarch: Charles III
- Governor: Jeannette Young
- Premier: Steven Miles
- Deputy Premier: Cameron Dick
- No. of ministers: 19
- Member party: Labor
- Status in legislature: Majority government 51 / 93
- Opposition party: Liberal National
- Opposition leader: David Crisafulli

History
- Legislature term: 2020–2024
- Predecessor: Palaszczuk III
- Successor: Crisafulli

The Miles ministry was a ministry of the Government of Queensland led by Steven Miles. Miles was elected the leader of the Queensland Labor Party and subsequently premier following the resignation of Annastacia Palaszczuk on 15 December 2023.

== Cabinet outlook ==
=== Initial composition ===
Portrait	Minister	Portfolio	Took office	Left office	Duration of tenure	Party	Electorate
Cabinet Ministers
	Steven Miles	Premier	15 December 2023	28 October 2024	2 years, 336 days	Labor	Murrumba
	Cameron Dick	Deputy Premier; Treasurer; Minister for Trade and Investment	15 December 2023	28 October 2024	2 years, 336 days	Labor	Woodridge
	Grace Grace	Minister for State Development and Infrastructure; Minister for Industrial Relations; Minister for Racing	18 December 2023	28 October 2024	2 years, 333 days	Labor	McConnel
	Shannon Fentiman	Minister for Health, Mental Health and Ambulance Services; Minister for Women	18 December 2023	28 October 2024	2 years, 333 days	Labor	Waterford
	Yvette D'Ath	Attorney-General and Minister for Justice; Minister for the Prevention of Domestic and Family Violence	18 December 2023	28 October 2024	2 years, 333 days	Labor	Redcliffe
	Mick de Brenni	Minister for Energy and Clean Economy Jobs	18 December 2023	28 October 2024	2 years, 333 days	Labor	Springwood
	Meaghan Scanlon	Minister for Housing, Local Government and Planning; Minister for Public Works	18 December 2023	28 October 2024	2 years, 333 days	Labor	Gaven
	Mark Ryan	Minister for Police and Community Safety	18 December 2023	28 October 2024	2 years, 333 days	Labor	Morayfield
	Leeanne Enoch	Minister for Treaty; Minister for Aboriginal and Torres Strait Islander Partnerships; Minister for Communities; Minister for the Arts	18 December 2023	28 October 2024	2 years, 333 days	Labor	Algester
	Di Farmer	Minister for Education; Minister for Youth Justice	18 December 2023	28 October 2024	2 years, 333 days	Labor	Bulimba
	Mark Furner	Minister for Agricultural Industry Development and Fisheries; Minister for Rural Communities	18 December 2023	28 October 2024	2 years, 333 days	Labor	Ferny Grove
	Glenn Butcher	Minister for Regional Development and Manufacturing; Minister for Water	18 December 2023	28 October 2024	2 years, 333 days	Labor	Gladstone
	Scott Stewart	Minister for Resources and Critical Minerals	18 December 2023	28 October 2024	2 years, 333 days	Labor	Townsville
	Leanne Linard	Minister for the Environment and the Great Barrier Reef; Minister for Science and Innovation	18 December 2023	28 October 2024	2 years, 333 days	Labor	Nudgee
	Nikki Boyd	Minister for Fire and Disaster Recovery; Minister for Corrective Services	18 December 2023	28 October 2024	2 years, 333 days	Labor	Pine Rivers
	Bart Mellish	Minister for Transport and Main Roads; Minister for Digital Services	18 December 2023	28 October 2024	2 years, 333 days	Labor	Aspley
	Lance McCallum	Minister for Employment and Small Business; Minister for Training and Skills Development	18 December 2023	28 October 2024	2 years, 333 days	Labor	Bundamba
	Charis Mullen	Minister for Child Safety; Minister for Seniors and Disability Services; Minister for Multicultural Affairs	18 December 2023	28 October 2024	2 years, 333 days	Labor	Jordan
	Michael Healy	Minister for Tourism and Sport	21 December 2023	28 October 2024	2 years, 330 days	Labor	Cairns
Assistant Ministers
	Bruce Saunders	Assistant Minister for Train Manufacturing, Regional Development and Jobs	18 December 2023	28 October 2024	2 years, 333 days	Labor	Maryborough
	Julieanne Gilbert	Assistant Minister for State Development, Infrastructure, Industrial Relations and Racing	18 December 2023	28 October 2024	2 years, 333 days	Labor	Mackay
	Brittany Lauga	Assistant Minister for Health and Regional Health Infrastructure	18 December 2023	28 October 2024	2 years, 333 days	Labor	Keppel
	Ali King	Assistant Minister for Housing, Local Government, Planning and Public Works	18 December 2023	28 October 2024	2 years, 333 days	Labor	Pumicestone
	Jennifer Howard	Assistant Minister for Treasury, Trade and Investment	18 December 2023	28 October 2024	2 years, 333 days	Labor	Ipswich
	Shane King	Assistant Minister for Clean Economy Jobs	18 December 2023	28 October 2024	2 years, 333 days	Labor	Kurwongbah
	Corrine McMillan	Assistant Minister for Education and Youth Justice	18 December 2023	28 October 2024	2 years, 333 days	Labor	Mansfield
	Jimmy Sullivan	Assistant Minister for Justice and Veterans' Affairs	18 December 2023	28 October 2024	2 years, 333 days	Labor	Stafford

== Notes ==
Parliament of Queensland
Preceded by Third Palaszczuk ministry	Miles Ministry; 2023/24	Succeeded by Crisafulli ministry
