= Candidates of the 2024 Queensland state election =

Contesting candidate names

The candidates of the 2024 Queensland state election vary and cover all ninety-three electorates in all of the state's regions. A total of 525 candidates from nine political parties (or independent) contested the election. It is the second-most contested election by nominated candidates in Queensland history, behind the previous election (2020).

== Retiring MPs ==
=== Labor ===
- Yvette D'Ath (Redcliffe) – announced retirement on 22 February 2024, citing the need to find more balance in her life.
- Julieanne Gilbert (Mackay) – announced retirement on 25 July 2024.
- Stirling Hinchliffe (Sandgate) – announced retirement on 11 October 2023.
- Barry O'Rourke (Rockhampton) – announced retirement on 13 November 2023, citing health issues.
- Curtis Pitt (Mulgrave) – announced retirement on 22 August 2024.

=== Liberal National ===
- Michael Hart (Burleigh) – announced retirement on 6 September 2023.
- Lachlan Millar (Gregory) – announced retirement on 18 October 2023.
- Mark Robinson (Oodgeroo) – announced retirement on 16 June 2023.
- Darren Zanow (Ipswich West) – announced retirement on 12 July 2024, due to his diagnosis of Microvascular ischemic disease.

== Candidates ==
Crisafulli began announcing LNP candidates 18 months prior to the election, making the LNP the first party to formally endorse candidates for the election. The LNP announced several other candidates afterwards. The second party to formally endorse a candidate was Katter's Australian Party (KAP), announcing Bruce Logan as their candidate for the Far North Queensland seat of Cook on 6 October 2023. Logan would later withdraw from the race, citing family issues and property damage arising from Cyclone Jasper. Names of incumbent MPs who are contesting are highlighted in bold.

Electorate	Held by	Labor candidate	LNP candidate	Greens candidate	One Nation candidate	KAP candidate	Family First candidate	Other candidates
Algester	Labor	**Leeanne Enoch**	Jitendra Prasad	Andrea Wildin	George Maris	-	Jane Turner	Rhys Bosley (Ind. KAP)
Aspley	Labor	**Bart Mellish**	Amanda Cooper	Fiona Hawkins	Allan Hall	–	Wayne Capell	–
Bancroft	Labor	**Chris Whiting**	Rob Barridge	Gabrielle Unverzagt	Matthew Langfield	–	–	Barry Grant (Ind)
Barron River	Labor	**Craig Crawford**	Bree James	Denise Crew	Peter Eicens	Ben Campbell	–	–
Bonney	LNP	Kyle Kelly-Collins	**Sam O'Connor**	Amin Javanmard	Scott Philip	–	Maria Theresia Rossouw	–
Broadwater	LNP	Tamika Hicks	**David Crisafulli**	Simon Margan	Steven Whitehead	–	Peter Edwards	–
Buderim	LNP	Adrian Burke	**Brent Mickelberg**	Deborah Moseley	Ryan Beall	–	–	Shaun Sandow (LCQ)
Bulimba	Labor	**Di Farmer**	Laura Wong	Linda Barry	Jonathon Andrade	–	–	Matthew Bellina (Ind)
Bundaberg	Labor	**Tom Smith**	Bree Watson	Nat Baker	Alberto Carvalho	–	–	Alan Corbett (Ind); Ian Zunker (LCQ); Geoff Warham (Ind)
Bundamba	Labor	**Lance McCallum**	Carl Mutzelburg	Tracey Nayler	Kelvin Brown	–	Jeremy Williams	Clive Brazier (LCQ); Edward Carroll (Ind Prog); Angela Lowery (AJP)
Burdekin	LNP	Anne Baker	**Dale Last**	Ben Watkin	Andrew Elborne	Daniel Carroll	Amanda Nickson	–
Burleigh	LNP	Claire Carlin	Hermann Vorster	Hunter Grove-McGrath	Eliot Tasses	–	Neena Tester	Jason Gann (LCQ); Cathy Osborne (LBT); Amelia Dunn (AJP)
Burnett	LNP	Kerri Morgan	**Stephen Bennett**	Esther Vale	Arno Blank	–	–	Malcolm Parry (LCQ); Paul Hudson (Ind)
Cairns	Labor	**Michael Healy**	Yolonde Entsch	Josh Holt	Geena Court	–	–	Shane Cuthbert (Ind)
Callide	LNP	Samantha Dendle	**Bryson Head**	Matthew Passant	Christopher O'Callaghan	–	John Whittle	Duncan Scott (Ind)
Caloundra	Labor	**Jason Hunt**	Kendall Morton	Peta Higgs	Ben Storch	–	–	Allison McMaster (LCQ); Pamela Mariko (AJP); Mike Jessop (Ind)
Capalaba	Labor	**Don Brown**	Russell Field	Donna Weston	David Schmid	–	–	–
Chatsworth	LNP	Lisa O’Donnell	**Steve Minnikin**	James Smart	Jasmine Harte (disendorsed)	–	Eliza Campbell	–
Clayfield	LNP	Belle Brookfield	**Tim Nicholls**	Jaimyn Mayer	Michelle Wilde	–	–	Nick Buick (LBT)
Condamine	LNP	Ben Whibley-Faulkner	**Pat Weir**	Ellisa Parker	Clay Harland	–	Alan Hughes	–
Cook	Labor	**Cynthia Lui**	David Kempton	Troy Miller	Peter Campion	Duane Amos	–	–
Coomera	LNP	Chris Johnson	**Michael Crandon**	Stuart Fletcher	Nick Muir	–	Nathan O'Brien	Suzette Luyken (LCQ)
Cooper	Labor	**Jonty Bush**	Raewyn Bailey	Katinka Winston-Allom	Susan Ventnor	–	Donna Gallehawk	–
Currumbin	LNP	Nathan Fleury	**Laura Gerber**	Braden Smith	Angela Gunson	–	David Totenhofer	Kath Down (Ind); Jennifer Horsburgh (AJP)
Everton	LNP	Michelle Byard	**Tim Mander**	Brent McDowall	Alan Buchbach	–	–	–
Ferny Grove	Labor	**Mark Furner**	Nelson Savanh	Elizabeth McAulay	Leonie Swanner	–	–	–
Gaven	Labor	**Meaghan Scanlon**	Bianca Stone	Sally Spain	Sandy Roach	–	Ian Reid	Jenelle Porter (LCQ)
Gladstone	Labor	**Glenn Butcher**	Steve Askew	Beau Pett	Andrew Jackson	–	Christopher Herring	Murray Peterson (Ind); Brianna Corcoran (LCQ)
Glass House	LNP	Humphrey Caspersz	**Andrew Powell**	Andrew McLean	Adam Farr	–	Bronwen Bolitho	Tim Hallcroft (LCQ)
Greenslopes	Labor	**Joe Kelly**	Andrew Newbold	Rebecca White	Hugh Dickson	–	Karine Davis	–
Gregory	LNP	Rebecca Humphreys	Sean Dillon	Ell-Leigh Ackerman	Michael Ellison	–	John Campbell	–
Gympie	LNP	Lachlan Anderson	**Tony Perrett**	Emma Buhse	Katy McCallum	–	–	–
Hervey Bay	Labor	**Adrian Tantari**	David Lee	Pat Walsh	Quinn Hendry	–	–	Jeff Knipe (LCQ)
Hill	KAP	Michael Hodgkins	Cameron McCollum	Jennifer Cox	Brenda Turner	**Shane Knuth**	–	Matt Lachlan (Ind)
Hinchinbrook	KAP	Ina Pryor	Annette Swaine	Jon Kowski	Ric Daubert	**Nick Dametto**	–	Kevin Wheatley (LCQ)
Inala	Labor	**Margie Nightingale**	Trang Yen	Linh Nguyen	Carl Cassin	–	–	Van Andy Nguyen (AJP); Kieu Oanh Do (Ind)
Ipswich	Labor	**Jennifer Howard**	Damian Culpeper	Amanda Holly	Mathew Riesenweber	–	Karen Fuller	Deborah Forrester (LCQ)
Ipswich West	LNP	Wendy Bourne	Georgia Toft	Mark Delaney	Brad Trussell	–	Beverley Byrnes	Anthony Bull (LBT); Harmony Lindsay (LCQ)
Jordan	Labor	**Charis Mullen**	Kevin Burns	Dung Tran	Sabeh Abou Chahla	–	–	Michael Pucci (LBT)
Kawana	LNP	Jim Dawson	**Jarrod Bleijie**	Ian Simons	Peter Hinton	–	–	–
Keppel	Labor	**Brittany Lauga**	Nigel Hutton	Clancy Mullbrick	James Ashby	–	Roger McWhinney	Petrina Murphy (Ind)
Kurwongbah	Labor	**Shane King**	Tanya McKewen	Jordan Martin	Christopher Leech	–	Ross Pitt	Greg Dillon (AJP)
Lockyer	LNP	Euan Tiernan	**Jim McDonald**	Paul Toner	Corey West	–	Julie Rose	–
Logan	Labor	**Linus Power**	Mathew Owens	Joshua Riethmuller	Aaron Abraham	–	Simon Taylor	Jacqueline Verne (LCQ)
Lytton	Labor	**Joan Pease**	Chad Gardiner	Jade Whitla	David White	–	Jim Vote	Craig Moore (Ind)
Macalister	Labor	**Melissa McMahon**	Rob Van Manen	Liam Johns	Cheree Cooper	–	Paul Davis	Meredith Brisk (LCQ)
Mackay	Labor	Belinda Hassan	Nigel Dalton	Paula Creen	Kylee Stanton	–	Norman Martin	Ben Gauci (LCQ)
Maiwar	Greens	Susan Irvine	Natasha Winters	**Michael Berkman**	Grant Spork	–	–	–
Mansfield	Labor	**Corrine McMillan**	Pinky Singh	Wen Li	Katrina Coleman	–	Ross Dovey	–
Maroochydore	LNP	Naomi McQueen	**Fiona Simpson**	Heinrich Koekemoer	Kyle Haley	–	–	Mark Wadeson (Ind)
Maryborough	Labor	**Bruce Saunders**	John Barounis	Lauren Granger-Brown	Taryn Gillard	–	Kerry Petrus	Jamie Miller (Ind); Daniel Beattie (Ind)
McConnel	Labor	**Grace Grace**	Christien Duffey	Holstein Wong	Gavin Jones	–	Kirsty Sands	
Mermaid Beach	LNP	Joseph Shiels	**Ray Stevens**	Lucy Carra Schulz	Roger Marquass	–	Clare Todd	
Miller	Labor	**Mark Bailey**	Clio Padayachee	Liam Flenady	Ashley Pettit	–	–	Carola Veloso-Busich (AJP)
Mirani	KAP	Susan Teder	Glen Kelly	Maria Carty	Brettlyn Neal	**Stephen Andrew**	Patricia Martin	–
Moggill	LNP	Eric Richman	**Christian Rowan**	Andrew Kidd	Cheryl Wood	–	–	–
Morayfield	Labor	**Mark Ryan**	Sarah Ross	Mark Jessup	Rodney Hansen	–	Suniti Hewett	Frank Jordan (LCQ)
Mount Ommaney	Labor	**Jessica Pugh**	Lisa Baillie	Chris Richardson	Thorold Cusack	–	–	Michelle Jensz (AJP)
Mudgeeraba	LNP	Sophie Lynch	**Ros Bates**	Scott Turner	Carl Mocnik	–	Samuel Buckley	–
Mulgrave	Labor	Richie Bates	Terry James	Peter Everett	Michael McInnes	Steven Lesina	Les Searle	Yodie Batzke (Ind); Nicholas Daniels (LCQ); Dave Raymond (Ind); Ian Jimmy Floyd (Ind)
Mundingburra	Labor	**Les Walker**	Janelle Poole	Rebecca Haley	Mick Olsen	Michael Pugh	–	–
Murrumba	Labor	**Steven Miles**	Gary Fulton	Deklan Green	Duncan Geldenhuys	–	David Todd	Sarah Kropman (Ind); David Zaloudek (LCQ); Scott Donovan (Ind DLP); Caleb Wells (Ind)
Nanango	LNP	Val Heward	**Deb Frecklington**	Angus Ryan	Adam Maslen	–	Benjamin Mitchell	Anthony Hopkins (LCQ); Jason Miles (Ind); Nathan Hope (Ind)
Nicklin	Labor	**Robert Skelton**	Marty Hunt	Sue Etheridge	Rebecca McCosker	–	Phillip Eschler	Melody Lindsay (LCQ); Steve Dickson (Ind)
Ninderry	LNP	Jo Justo	**Dan Purdie**	Tom Carden	Michael Stewart	–	–	Tim Nixon (LCQ)
Noosa	Independent	Mark Denham	Clare Stewart	Rhonda Prescott	Darrel Hinson	–	Felicity Roser	**Sandy Bolton** (Ind)
Nudgee	Labor	**Leanne Linard**	Robert Wilson	Jim Davies	Joshua Baer	–	Sharan Hall	Bruce Tanti (Ind)
Oodgeroo	LNP	Irene Henley	Amanda Stoker	Callen Sorensen Karklis	Justin Sheil	–	–	–
Pine Rivers	Labor	**Nikki Boyd**	Dean Clements	Sonja Gerdsen	Matthew Robinson	–	–	Maureen Brohman (AJP)
Pumicestone	Labor	**Ali King**	Ariana Doolan	Richard Ogden	Samuel Beaton	–	Laine Harth	Rosemary Doolan (LCQ)
Redcliffe	Labor	Kassandra Hall	Kerri-Anne Dooley	Will Simon	Simon Salloum	–	–	Gerard Saunders (Ind)
Redlands	Labor	**Kim Richards**	Rebecca Young	Kristie Lockhart	Gary Williamson	–	Marita Neville	Suzanne Spierenburg (LCQ); Liela D'Rose (AJP)
Rockhampton	Labor	Craig Marshall	Donna Kirkland	Mick Jones	David Bond	–	Fredy Johnston	Margaret Strelow (Ind); Jacinta Waller (LCQ)
Sandgate	Labor	Bisma Asif	Chris Mangan	Rachel Kennedy	Glen Barry	–	Russell Gee	Chris Simpson (Ind Dem); Victor Barwick (Ind)
Scenic Rim	LNP	Shireen Casey	**Jon Krause**	Nicole Thompson	Wayne Ziebarth	–	Louise Austin	–
South Brisbane	Greens	Barbara O'Shea	Marita Parkinson	**Amy MacMahon**	Richard Henderson	–	–	–
Southern Downs	LNP	Greg Johnson	**James Lister**	David Newport	Liz Suduk	–	Melinda Keller	–
Southport	LNP	Letitia Del Fabbro	**Rob Molhoek**	Mitch McCausland	David Vaughan	–	Ruth Fea	–
Springwood	Labor	**Mick de Brenni**	Susanna Damianopoulos	Ben Harry	Glen Cookson	–	Gabrielle Davis	Karley Saidy-Hennessey (Ind)
Stafford	Labor	**Jimmy Sullivan**	Fiona Hammond	Jessica Lane	Stuart Andrews	–	Alan Denaro	–
Stretton	Labor	**James Martin**	Freya Ostapovitch	Ahmed Abdulhamed	Stephen Strong	–	Merle Totenhofer	–
Surfers Paradise	LNP	James Knight	**John-Paul Langbroek**	Steven Everson	Mark Jaric	–	Andrea Campbell	Haydn Jolly (AJP)
Theodore	LNP	Rita Anwari	**Mark Boothman**	Andrew Stimson	Cassandra Duffill	–	Eleanor McAlpine	Chloe Snyman (AJP)
Thuringowa	Labor	**Aaron Harper**	Natalie Marr	Roxanne Kennedy-Perriman	Steven Clare	Reuben Richardson	–	Natasha Lane (Ind)
Toohey	Labor	**Peter Russo**	Taylor Hull	Melissa McArdle	Hayden O'Brien	–	–	–
Toowoomba North	LNP	James Green	**Trevor Watts**	Thom Roker	Sebastian Lund	–	Kerri Hislop	–
Toowoomba South	LNP	Susan Krause	**David Janetzki**	Wren Beith	Eaton Haines	–	Alex Todd	Ingrid Weber (LCQ)
Townsville	Labor	**Scott Stewart**	Adam Baillie	Benjamin Tiley	Alan Butt	Margie Ryder	William Tento	Wesley Newman (Ind)
Traeger	KAP	Georgia Heath	Yvonne Tunney	Louise Raynaud	Peter Rawle	**Robbie Katter**	–	–
Warrego	LNP	Jack Hargreaves	**Ann Leahy**	Ian Mazlin	Hayley Titmarsh	–	Chris Schenk	Daniel Gill (Ind); Angela Adams (LCQ)
Waterford	Labor	**Shannon Fentiman**	Jacob Heremaia	Kirsty Petersen	Callum Whatmore	–	Karen Cloherty	Julius Taylor (LCQ)
Whitsunday	LNP	Bauke Hovinga	**Amanda Camm**	Elena Quirk	Julie Hall	–	Peter Atchison	–
Woodridge	Labor	**Cameron Dick**	Paul Darwen	Ansary Muhammed	Zoran Kazovic	–	Karilyn Larsen	–

== Disendorsements, withdrawals, suspensions and resignations ==
Date	Party	Candidate	Seat	Details
8 February 2024	Katter's Australian	Bruce Logan	Cook	Withdrew candidacy citing family issues and property damage arising from Cyclone Jasper.
30 April 2024	Katter's Australian	Clynton Hawks	Thuringowa	Disendorsed in "honourable agreement" as the party sought to endorse a better candidate for Thuringowa.
11 July 2024	One Nation	Matthew Millar	Thuringowa	Candidacy suspended in order to give Millar "the opportunity to gather material to respond to claims concerning a previous relationship", pending a party investigation. Later disendorsed.
2 August 2024	One Nation	Stephen Andrew	Mirani	Incumbent MP disendorsed after he considered joining Katter's Australian Party.
2024 (Unknown date)	Greens	Eleanor Sharman	Lockyer	Withdrew candidacy for unknown reasons.
2024 (Unknown date)	Legalise Cannabis	Adam Benjamin	Caloundra	Withdrew candidacy for unknown reasons.
2024 (Unknown date)	Independent	Brett Finnis	Sandgate	Withdrew candidacy for unknown reasons.
15 September 2024	One Nation	Robyn Fitzgerald	Mundingburra	Withdrew candidacy due to family illness.
2024 (Unknown date)	Greens	Maja Chodorowski	Barron River	Withdrew candidacy due to family illness.
9 October 2024	One Nation	Jasmine Harte	Chatsworth	Disendorsed due to alleged inappropriate photos from her time as an exotic dancer and "other issues from her past".
