= 2024 Queensland Labor Party leadership election =

- 5 November 2024
- Leadership election
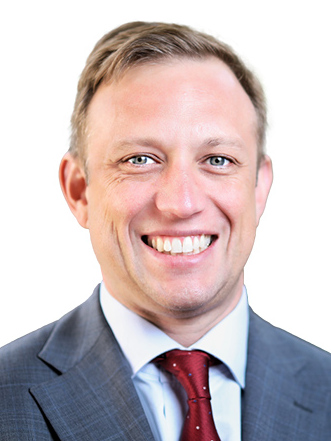
Candidate	Steven Miles
Electorate	Murrumba
Faction	Left
Caucus	Unopposed
Leader before election
Steven Miles
Elected Leader
Steven Miles
- Deputy leadership election
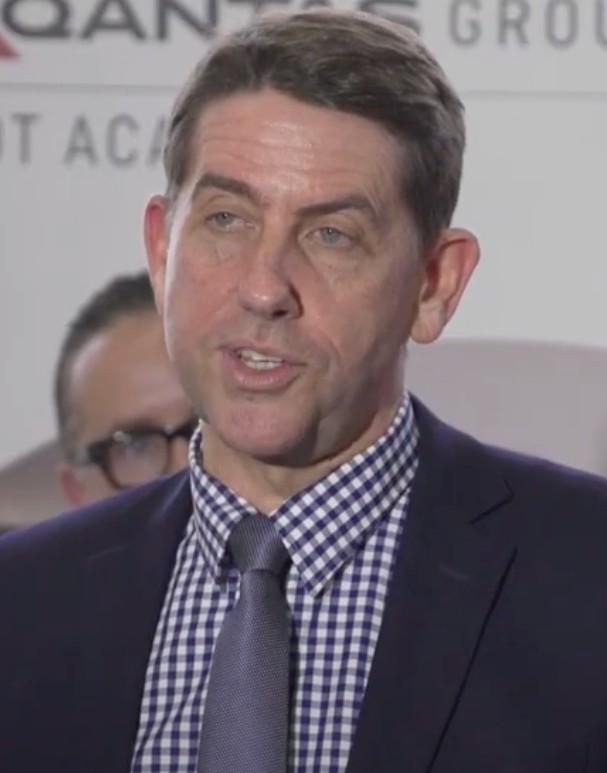
Candidate	Cameron Dick
Electorate	Woodridge
Faction	Right
Caucus	Unopposed
Deputy Leader before election
Cameron Dick
Elected Deputy Leader
Cameron Dick

The 2024 Queensland Labor Party leadership election was held on 5 November 2024 to elect the leader of the Queensland Labor Party and ex officio, Leader of the Opposition, following Labor's loss at the 2024 state election.

Former premier Steven Miles was re-elected unopposed to the leadership, with Cameron Dick also re-elected as deputy leader. Dick, along with senior Labor MP Shannon Fentiman, had announced following the state election that they would not contest the leadership if Miles did.

== Background ==
=== Procedure ===
Labor's rules authorise the formal method in which the leader is appointed. Section K of the party's rules state that: "A ballot for Leader of the State Parliamentary Labor Party (SPLP) will be called if any of the following conditions are met:

- • a. a state general election loss
- • b. a casual vacancy where the leader resigns or becomes permanently unavailable
- • c. not less than 50% of members of caucus petition the State Secretary for a ballot."

After this, the party's Administrative Committee will call for nominations for SPLP leader and approve a timetable for elections on the advice of the General Returning Officer.

If more than one candidate is nominated, an election will be held through three separate equal-weight ballots of the SPLP (state MPs, also known as the Caucus), rank-and-file party members and affiliated unions.

The rules were reformed in November 2013 to give rank-and-file members and unions a direct vote in the leadership election, following similar reforms introduced by then-prime minister Kevin Rudd for the federal Labor Party in July 2013.

== Candidates ==
=== Leader ===
==== Declared ====
Candidate	Electorate	Faction	Union affiliation	Portfolio(s)
Steven Miles	Murrumba	Labor Left	United Workers Union	Premier (2023–2024); Deputy Premier (2020–2023); Minister for State Development, Infrastructure, Local Government and Planning (2021–2024)

==== Speculated ====
Candidate	Electorate	Faction	Union affiliation	Portfolio(s)
Shannon Fentiman	Waterford	Labor Left	Australian Manufacturing Workers Union	Minister for Health and Ambulance Services (2023–2024); Minister for Mental Health (2023–2024); Minister for Women (2020–2024)
Cameron Dick	Woodridge	Labor Right	Australian Workers' Union	Deputy Premier (2023-2024); Treasurer (2020–2024); Minister for Trade and Investment (2021–2024)
