= 2023 Queensland Labor Party leadership election =

- 15 December 2023
- Leadership election
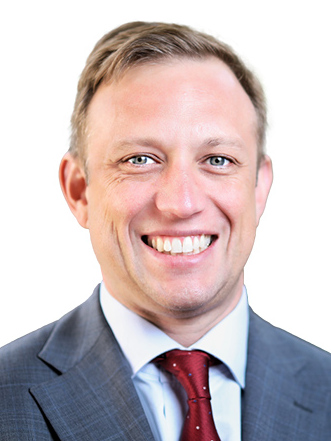
Candidate	Steven Miles
Electorate	Murrumba
Faction	Left
Caucus	Unopposed
Leader before election
Annastacia Palaszczuk
Elected Leader
Steven Miles
- Deputy leadership election
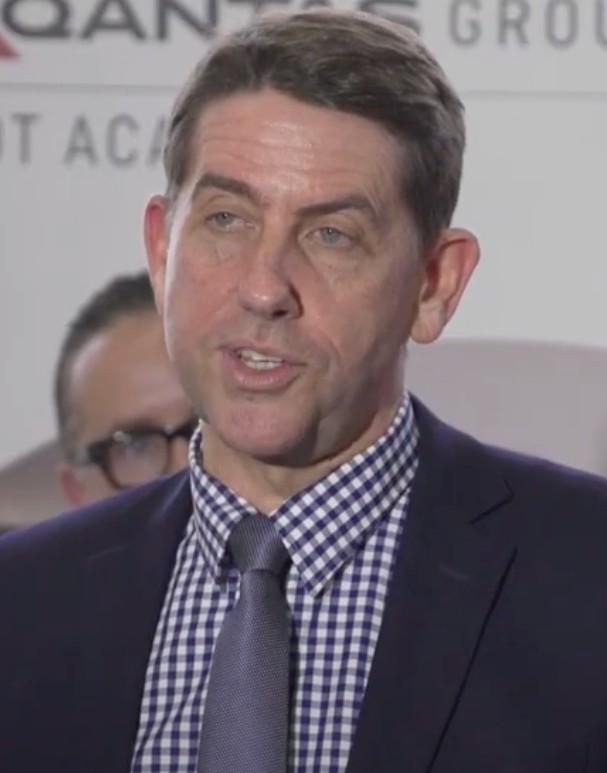
Candidate	Cameron Dick
Electorate	Woodridge
Faction	Right
Caucus	Unopposed
Deputy Leader before election
Steven Miles
Elected Deputy Leader
Cameron Dick

The 2023 Queensland Labor Party leadership election was held on 15 December 2023 to elect a new leader of the Queensland Labor Party and ex officio, Premier of Queensland, following the resignation of Annastacia Palaszczuk as both premier and MP for Inala. Steven Miles was appointed leader unopposed, while Cameron Dick was appointed deputy leader unopposed.

== Background ==
Annastacia Palaszczuk was first elected as leader of the Queensland Labor Party following the party's landslide defeat at the 2012 state election where the party was reduced to seven seats. She had served as a minister in the Bligh cabinet in the Disability Services, Multicutural Affairs and Transport portfolios. Palaszczuk led Labor back to an unexpected victory at the 2015 state election defeating the then one-term Liberal National government. During her time as Premier, Palaszczuk oversaw a range of policy initiatives and reforms. Notable among these are electoral reforms and increase in public service employees. She subsequently led the party to two additional terms following the 2017 and 2020 state election's and continued on with policies such as banning single-use plastics, the successful bid for the 2032 Summer Olympics and commencement of the Cross River Rail project. Palaszczuk also oversaw the handling of natural disasters, such as the 2022 eastern Australia floods and the COVID-19 pandemic in Queensland.

Beginning in late August 2023, there was speculation as to how long Annastacia Palaszczuk would remain as Labor Leader and Premier. One reason for the speculation was the opinion polling for the next state election (2024), which displayed Opposition Leader David Crisafulli, of the Liberal National Party (LNP), as the preferred Premier of the state in consistent polls. Deputy Leader (and Deputy Premier) Steven Miles said at the time that there was "no prospect" of the Premier standing aside voluntarily and her ministers wanted her to stay. Shannon Fentiman, Labor MP for Waterford and Minister for Health and Ambulance Services, also denied the rumours, including the speculation that she was approached to replace Annastacia Palaszczuk as leader of the party in the lead up to Palaszczuk's formal resignation in December 2023.

=== Procedure ===
Labor's rules authorise the formal method in which the leader is appointed. Section K of the party's rules state that: "A ballot for Leader of the State Parliamentary Labor Party (SPLP) will be called if any of the following conditions are met:

- • a. a state general election loss
- • b. a casual vacancy where the leader resigns or becomes permanently unavailable
- • c. not less than 50% of members of caucus petition the State Secretary for a ballot."

After this, the party's Administrative Committee will call for nominations for SPLP leader and approve a timetable for elections on the advice of the General Returning Officer.

If more than one candidate is nominated, an election will be held through three separate equal-weight ballots of the SPLP (state MPs, also known as the Caucus), rank-and-file party members and affiliated unions.

The rules were reformed in November 2013 to give rank-and-file members and unions a direct vote in the leadership election, following similar reforms introduced by then-prime minister Kevin Rudd for the federal Labor Party in July 2013.

== Candidates ==
Only hours after Leader Annastacia Palaszczuk announced her resignation, Deputy Leader Steven Miles, of the party's Left faction, announced his bid to run for the leadership of the party and received the endorsement of Annastacia Palaszczuk, saying: "I believe he will make an excellent premier." Shannon Fentiman, also of the Left faction has been put forward as a potential candidate, and Treasurer Cameron Dick, whom is aligned with the party's Right faction, is named as a possible candidate. On Monday, 11 December 2023, Fentiman was formally nominated as a candidate for the leadership. The following day however (12 December 2023), Fentiman officially withdrew from the leadership contest, with factional and union alignment believed to be in Miles' favour. Cameron Dick was revealed to be the expected Deputy Leader if Miles was to become Leader, and gave Miles his endorsement.

=== Leader ===
==== Declared ====
Candidate	Electorate	Faction	Union affiliation	Portfolio(s)
Steven Miles	Murrumba	Labor Left	United Workers Union	Deputy Premier (2020–present); Minister for State Development, Infrastructure, Local Government and Planning (2021–present)

==== Withdrawn ====
Candidate	Electorate	Faction	Union affiliation	Portfolio(s)
Shannon Fentiman	Waterford	Labor Left	Australian Manufacturing Workers Union	Minister for Health and Ambulance Services (2023–present); Minister for Mental Health (2023–present); Minister for Women (2020–present)

=== Deputy leader ===
==== Declared ====
Candidate	Electorate	Faction	Union affiliation	Portfolio(s)
Cameron Dick	Woodridge	Labor Right	Australian Workers' Union	Treasurer (2020–present); Minister for Trade and Investment (2021–present)

== See also ==
- 2024 Inala state by-election
- 2023 Western Australian Labor Party leadership election (June 2023)
- 2023 Victorian Labor Party leadership election (September 2023)
- 2023 Territory Labor Party leadership election (December 2023)
