= Third Palaszczuk ministry =

Ministry of the Government of Queensland (2020–2023)

Third Palaszczuk Ministry
- 41st Cabinet of Queensland

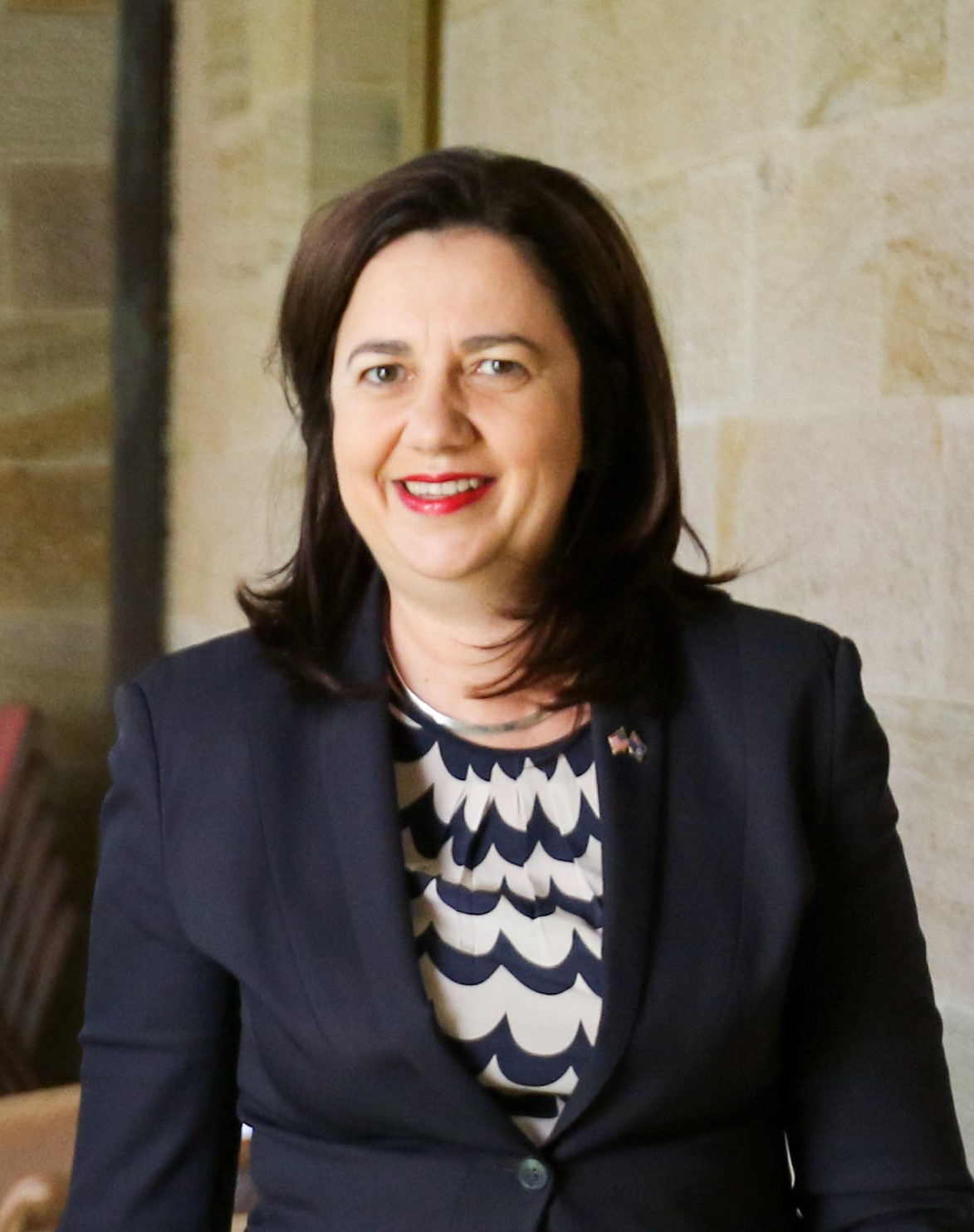
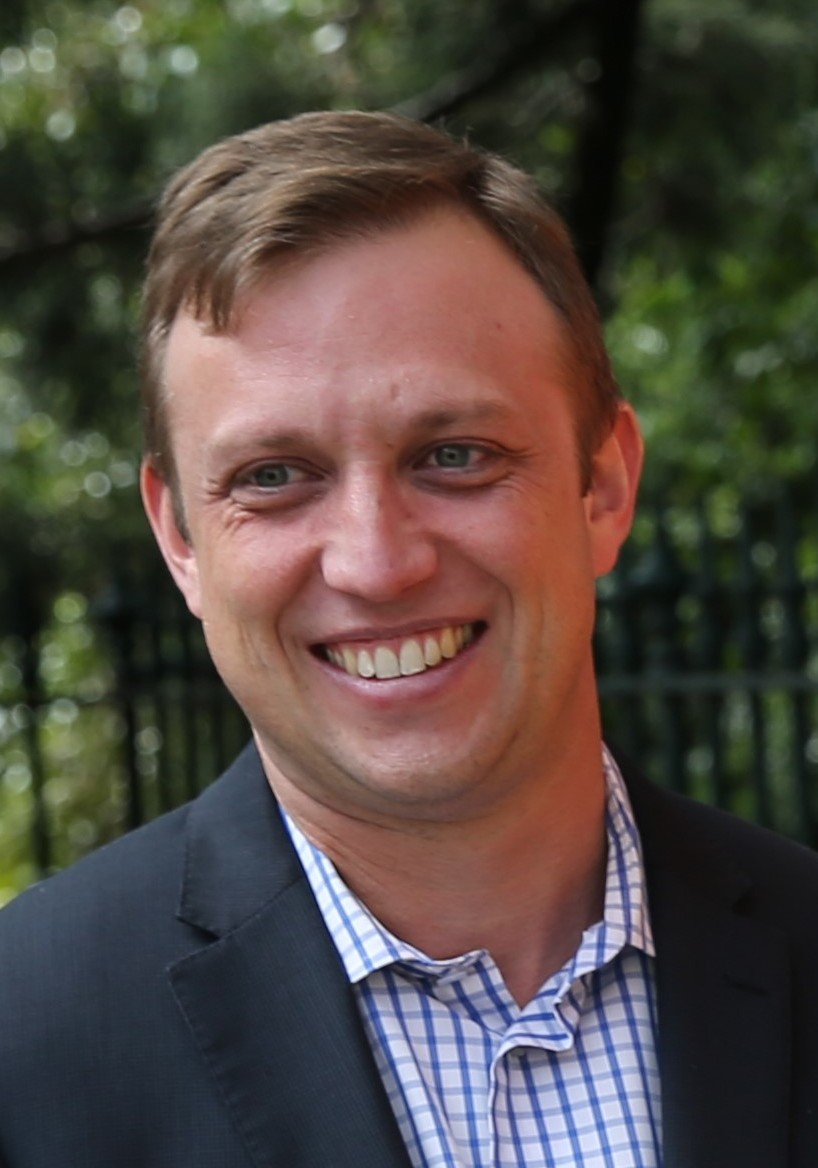
- Annastacia Palaszczuk (Premier) Steven Miles (Deputy Premier)
- Date formed: 12 November 2020
- Date dissolved: 15 December 2023

People and organisations
- Monarch: Elizabeth II (until 8 September 2022); Charles III (from 8 September 2022)
- Governor: Paul de Jersey (until 1 November 2021); Jeannette Young (from 1 November 2021)
- Premier: Annastacia Palaszczuk
- Deputy premier: Steven Miles
- No. of ministers: 18
- Member party: Labor
- Status in legislature: Majority government 52 / 93
- Opposition party: Liberal National
- Opposition leader: David Crisafulli

History
- Election: 2020 Queensland state election
- Legislature term: 2020–2024
- Predecessor: Palaszczuk II
- Successor: Miles

The Third Palaszczuk Ministry was a ministry of the Government of Queensland led by Annastacia Palaszczuk. Palaszczuk led the Labor Party to a majority victory in the 2020 state election and a third term in government since 2015. Cabinet's first meeting was held on 16 November 2020 (16 days post-election) in the Sunshine Coast suburb of Caloundra.

== Cabinet outlook ==
=== Cabinet reshuffle, 2023 ===
In mid-May 2023, it was reported that the Palaszczuk cabinet was going to have a 'refresh', avoiding the term reshuffle. The media alleged Shannon Fentiman and Yvette D'Ath were to be swapping one portfolio, with Meaghan Scanlon touted for promotion, among others. The official cabinet changes were announced the following day, on 18 May 2023. Numerous cabinet minister changed roles, including aforementioned Shannon Fentiman and Yvette D'Ath, Mark Bailey, Meaghan Scanlon, Leeanne Enoch, Di Farmer, Leanne Linard, and Craig Crawford.

Portrait	Minister	Portfolio	Took office	Left office	Duration of tenure	Party	Electorate
Department of the Premier and Cabinet
	Annastacia Palaszczuk	Premier; Minister for the Olympic and Paralympic Games (from 7 October 2021)	14 February 2015	15 December 2023 (Premier)	8 years, 304 days	Labor	Inala
	Steven Miles	Deputy Premier; Minister for State Development, Infrastructure, Local Government and Planning (from 7 October 2021); Minister Assisting the Premier on Olympic and Paralympic Games Infrastructure (from 7 October 2021)	12 November 2020	15 December 2023	3 years, 33 days	Labor	Murrumba
Outer Cabinet
	Cameron Dick	Treasurer of Queensland; Minister for Trade and Investment (from 7 October 2021)	12 November 2020	28 October 2024	3 years, 33 days	Labor	Woodridge
	Grace Grace	Minister for Education; Minister for Industrial Relations; Minister for Racing	12 November 2020	Incumbent	6 years, 4 days	Labor	McConnel
	Shannon Fentiman	Minister for Health and Ambulance Services; Minister for Mental Health; Minister for Women (from 12 November 2020)	18 May 2023	Incumbent	3 years, 182 days	Labor	Waterford
	Mark Bailey	Minister for Transport and Main Roads; Minister for Digital Services (from 18 May 2023)	12 November 2020	Incumbent	6 years, 4 days	Labor	Miller
	Mick de Brenni	Minister for Energy, Renewables and Hydrogen; Minister for Public Works and Procurement	12 November 2020	Incumbent	6 years, 4 days	Labor	Springwood
	Yvette D'Ath	Attorney General and Minister for Justice; Minister for the Prevention of Domestic and Family Violence	18 May 2023	Incumbent	3 years, 182 days	Labor	Redcliffe
	Mark Ryan	Minister for Police and Corrective Services; Minister for Fire and Emergency Services	12 November 2020	Incumbent	6 years, 4 days	Labor	Morayfield
	Stirling Hinchliffe	Minister for Tourism, Innovation and Sport; Minister Assisting the Premier on Olympics and Paralympics Sport and Engagement	12 November 2020	Incumbent	6 years, 4 days	Labor	Sandgate
	Mark Furner	Minister for Agricultural Industry Development and Fisheries; Minister for Rural Communities	12 November 2020	Incumbent	6 years, 4 days	Labor	Ferny Grove
	Leeanne Enoch	Minister for Treaty; Minister for Aboriginal and Torres Strait Islander Partnerships; Minister for Communities (from 12 November 2020) (Note: The portfolio of Housing was dropped from Enoch (originally called "Minister for Communities and Housing") and given to Meaghan Scanlon on 18 May 2023.); Minister for the Arts (from 12 November 2020)	18 May 2023	Incumbent	3 years, 182 days	Labor	Algester
	Glenn Butcher	Minister for Regional Development and Manufacturing; Minister for Water	12 November 2020	Incumbent	6 years, 4 days	Labor	Gladstone
	Di Farmer	Minister for Employment and Small Business; Minister for Training and Skills Development; Minister for Youth Justice (from 18 May 2023)	12 November 2020	Incumbent	6 years, 4 days	Labor	Bulimba
	Craig Crawford	Minister for Child Safety (from 18 May 2023); Minister for Seniors and Disability Services	12 November 2020	Incumbent	6 years, 4 days	Labor	Barron River
	Scott Stewart	Minister for Resources	12 November 2020	Incumbent	6 years, 4 days	Labor	Townsville
	Meaghan Scanlon	Minister for Housing	18 May 2023	Incumbent	3 years, 182 days	Labor	Gaven
	Leanne Linard	Minister for the Environment and the Great Barrier Reef; Minister for Science; Minister for Multicultural Affairs (from 12 November 2020)	18 May 2023	Incumbent	3 years, 182 days	Labor	Nudgee
Assistant Ministers
	Bart Mellish	Assistant Minister to the Premier for Veterans' Affairs and the Public Sector	18 May 2023	Incumbent	3 years, 182 days	Labor	Aspley
	Nikki Boyd	Assistant Minister for Local Government	12 November 2020	Incumbent	6 years, 4 days	Labor	Pine Rivers
	Charis Mullen	Assistant Minister for Treasury	12 November 2020	Incumbent	6 years, 4 days	Labor	Jordan
	Brittany Lauga	Assistant Minister for Health and Regional Health Infrastructure	18 May 2023	Incumbent	3 years, 182 days	Labor	Keppel
	Julieanne Gilbert	Assistant Minister for Education	18 May 2023	Incumbent	3 years, 182 days	Labor	Mackay
	Bruce Saunders	Assistant Minister for Train Manufacturing and Regional Roads	12 November 2020	Incumbent	6 years, 4 days	Labor	Maryborough
	Lance McCallum	Assistant Minister for Energy	18 May 2023	Incumbent	3 years, 182 days	Labor	Bundamba
	Michael Healy	Assistant Minister for Tourism Industry Development	12 November 2020	Incumbent	6 years, 4 days	Labor	Cairns

=== Initial cabinet, 2020 ===
On 12 November 2020, Premier Palaszczuk announced a new line up for the ministry.

Portfolio	Minister	Image
Premier; Minister for Trade	Annastacia Palaszczuk	
Deputy Premier; Minister for State Development, Infrastructure, Local Government and Planning	Steven Miles	
Treasurer of Queensland; Minister for Investment	Cameron Dick	
Minister for Education; Minister for Industrial Relations; Minister for Racing	Grace Grace	
Minister for Health and Ambulance Services	Yvette D'Ath	
Minister for Transport and Main Roads	Mark Bailey	
Minister for Energy, Renewables and Hydrogen; Minister for Public Works and Procurement	Mick de Brenni	
Attorney-General and Minister for Justice; Minister for Women; Minister for the Prevention of Domestic and Family Violence	Shannon Fentiman	
Minister for Police and Corrective Services; Minister for Fire and Emergency Services	Mark Ryan	
Minister for Tourism Industry Development and Innovation; Minister for Sport	Stirling Hinchliffe	
Minister for Agricultural Industry Development and Fisheries; Minister for Rural Communities	Mark Furner	
Minister for Communities and Housing; Minister for Digital Economy; Minister for Arts	Leeanne Enoch	
Minister for Regional Development and Manufacturing; Minister for Water	Glenn Butcher	
Minister for Employment and Small Business; Minister for Training and Skills Development	Di Farmer	
Minister for Seniors and Disability Services; Minister for Aboriginal and Torres Strait Islander Partnerships	Craig Crawford	
Minister for Resources	Scott Stewart	
Minister for the Environment and the Great Barrier Reef; Minister for Science and Youth Affairs	Meaghan Scanlon	
Minister for Children and Youth Justice; Minister for Multicultural Affairs	Leanne Linard	
Assistant Ministers
Assistant Minister to the Premier for Veterans' Affairs, Trade and COVID Economic Recovery; Assistant Minister for Veteran Affairs	Bart Mellish	
Assistant Minister for Local Government	Nikki Boyd	
Assistant Minister for Treasury	Charis Mullen	
Assistant Minister for Education	Brittany Lauga	
Assistant Minister for Health Infrastructure	Julieanne Gilbert	
Assistant Minister for Train Manufacturing and Regional Roads	Bruce Saunders	
Assistant Minister for Hydrogen Development and the 50% Renewable Energy Target by 2030	Lance McCallum	
Assistant Minister for Tourism Industry Development	Michael Healy	
Parliamentary Roles
Government Chief Whip	Don Brown	
Senior Government Whip	Joan Pease	
Deputy Government Whip	Jess Pugh	

== Notes ==
Parliament of Queensland
Preceded by Second Palaszczuk ministry	Third Palaszczuk ministry 2020-2023	Succeeded by Miles ministry
