= Yvette D'Ath =

Australian politician

The Honourable Yvette D'Ath
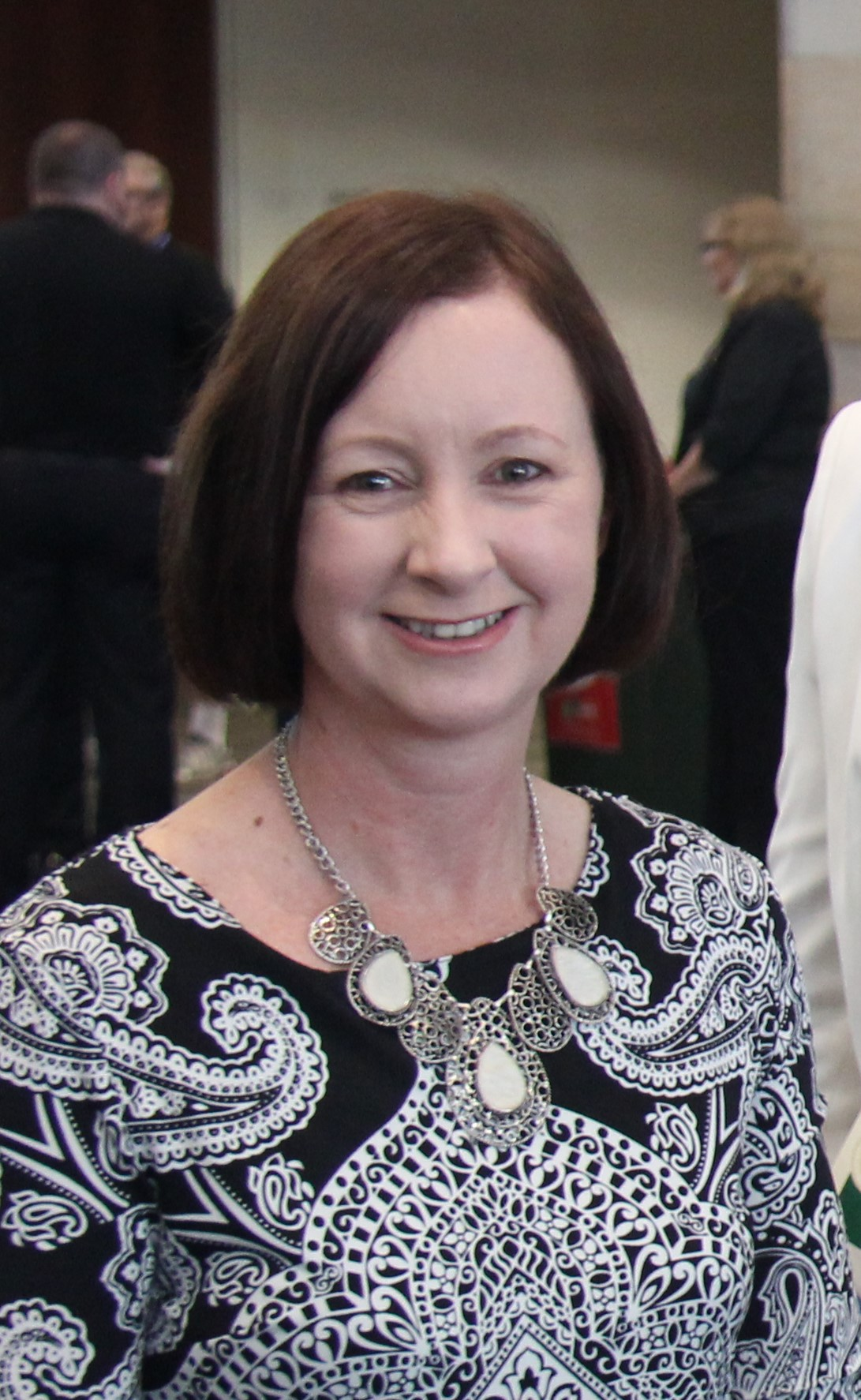
- D'Ath in 2014

Attorney-General of Queensland Minister for Justice
- In office 18 May 2023 – 28 October 2024
- Premier: Annastacia Palaszczuk; Steven Miles
- Preceded by: Shannon Fentiman
- Succeeded by: Deb Frecklington
- In office 16 February 2015 – 11 November 2020
- Premier: Annastacia Palaszczuk
- Preceded by: Jarrod Bleijie
- Succeeded by: Shannon Fentiman

Minister for the Prevention of Domestic and Family Violence
- In office 18 May 2023 – 28 October 2024
- Premier: Annastacia Palaszczuk; Steven Miles
- Preceded by: Shannon Fentiman
- Succeeded by: Amanda Camm
Other ministerial positions
Minister for Health and Ambulance Services
In office 12 November 2020 – 17 May 2023
Premier	Annastacia Palaszczuk
Preceded by	Steven Miles
Succeeded by	Shannon Fentiman
Leader of the House in Queensland
In office 11 December 2017 – 12 February 2024
Premier	Annastacia Palaszczuk; Steven Miles
Preceded by	Stirling Hinchliffe
Succeeded by	Mick de Brenni
Minister for Training and Skills
In office 16 February 2015 – 11 December 2017
Premier	Annastacia Palaszczuk
Preceded by	John-Paul Langbroek
Succeeded by	Shannon Fentiman
Opposition portfolios
Shadow Attorney-General Shadow Minister for Justice and Housing
In office 5 August 2014 – 15 February 2015
Leader	Annastacia Palaszczuk
Preceded by	Annastacia Palaszczuk (Justice); Jo-Ann Miller (Housing)
Succeeded by	Ian Walker (Justice); Rob Molhoek (Housing)
Shadow Minister for Training and Disability Services
In office 4 March 2014 – 15 February 2015
Leader	Annastacia Palaszczuk
Preceded by	Annastacia Palaszczuk (Training); Desley Scott (Disability Services)
Succeeded by	Tim Mander (Training); Tracy Davis (Disability Services)
Shadow Minister for Education, Science, IT and Innovation
In office 4 March 2014 – 4 August 2014
Leader	Annastacia Palaszczuk
Preceded by	Annastacia Palaszczuk
Succeeded by	Anthony Lynham

Parliamentary Secretary for Climate Change, Innovation and Industry
- In office 25 March 2013 – 18 September 2013
- Prime Minister: Kevin Rudd
- Preceded by: Mark Dreyfus
- Succeeded by: Bob Baldwin

Member of the Australian Parliament for Petrie
- In office 24 November 2007 – 7 September 2013
- Preceded by: Teresa Gambaro
- Succeeded by: Luke Howarth

Member of the Queensland Legislative Assembly for Redcliffe
- In office 22 February 2014 – 26 October 2024
- Preceded by: Scott Driscoll
- Succeeded by: Kerri-Anne Dooley

Personal details
- Born: Yvette Maree D'Ath; 26 July 1970 (age 56) Penrith, New South Wales, Australia
- Party: Australian Labor Party
- Spouse: George D'Ath (Divorced)
- Children: 2
- Education: Queensland University of Technology (LLB); Australian National University (GradDip)
- Profession: Politician; Policy adviser; Industrial advocate

Yvette Maree D'Ath (born 26 July 1970) is an Australian politician. She served as the Labor member for Redcliffe in the Legislative Assembly of Queensland from 2014 until her retirement in 2024. D'Ath served as Attorney-General and Minister for the Prevention of Family and Domestic Violence from 2023 to 2024. Prior to this she held an extensive list of various ministerial and other governmental positions, including Minister for Justice and Leader of the House. She was previously a Labor member of the Australian House of Representatives representing the outer Brisbane seat of Petrie from 2007 until her defeat at the 2013 Australian federal election.

== Education and early career ==
D'Ath graduated from the Queensland University of Technology with a Bachelor of Laws, followed by a Graduate Diploma in Legal Practice from the Australian National University. After working as a waitress, she was appointed an associate to the Queensland Industrial Relations Commission, serving between 1992 and 1994. She then became a senior industrial advocate for the Australian Workers' Union in Queensland.

== Federal politics ==
D'Ath won the seat of Petrie for Labor from Liberal Teresa Gambaro at the 2007 election with a 2-point margin from a 9.5-point swing, before increasing it to 2.5 points at the 2010 election. D'Ath was narrowly defeated by 0.5 points at the 2013 election.

Following the promotion of Mark Dreyfus as Attorney-General in February 2013, D'Ath was promoted to replace some of Dreyfus' responsibilities as Parliamentary Secretary for Climate Change and Energy Efficiency. Her responsibilities were altered and she became Parliamentary Secretary for Climate Change, Industry, and Innovation in a rearrangement of the Second Gillard Ministry on 25 March 2013.

== State politics ==
In December 2013, D'Ath was preselected to contest the state seat of Redcliffe at the 2014 by-election. The seat of Redcliffe covered much of the same area as her former federal seat of Petrie. She won the seat with a 17.2-point two-party swing to Labor. This increased Labor's representation in the Queensland Parliament from seven to eight seats. After the by-election victory D'Ath was made the Shadow Minister for Education and Training, Disability Services, Science, IT and Innovation.

On 27 August 2014, D'Ath was made the Shadow Attorney-General, the Shadow Minister for Justice and the Shadow Minister for Training, Disability Services and Housing after a reshuffle prompted by the Labor victory in the Stafford by-election.

=== Palaszczuk government ===
After Labor's victory in the 2015 Queensland State Election, D'Ath was sworn in as Attorney-General, Minister for Justice and Minister for Training and Skills in the Palaszczuk Ministry on 16 February 2015.

Following the 2017 Queensland State Election, in which the Palaszczuk government was returned with a majority, D'Ath retained her position as Attorney-General and Minister for Justice.

D'Ath retained her seat of Redcliffe in the 2020 Queensland state election, becoming the Minister for Health and Ambulance Services. She was succeeded as Attorney-General and Minister for Justice by Shannon Fentiman.

After a Cabinet reshuffle in May 2023, D'Ath reassumed her position as Attorney-General and Minister for Justice. Additionally, she became Minister for the Prevention of Domestic and Family Violence (previously held by Fentiman) for the first time in her career.

== See also ==
- First Palaszczuk Ministry
- Second Palaszczuk Ministry
- Third Palaszczuk Ministry
- Miles ministry

Parliament of Australia
Preceded by Teresa Gambaro	Member for Petrie; 2007–2013	Succeeded by Luke Howarth
Parliament of Queensland
Preceded by Scott Driscoll	Member for Redcliffe; 2014–2024	Succeeded by Kerri-Anne Dooley
Political offices
Preceded by Jarrod Bleijie	Attorney-General of Queensland; 2015–2020	Succeeded by Shannon Fentiman
Preceded by John-Paul Langbroek	Minister for Training and Skills; 2015–2017	Succeeded by Shannon Fentiman
Preceded by Steven Miles	Minister for Health and Ambulance Services; 2020–2023	Succeeded by Shannon Fentiman
Preceded by Shannon Fentiman	Attorney-General of Queensland; 2023–2024	Vacant
