= Nikki Boyd =

Australian politician

Nikki Boyd MP

Assistant Minister for Local Government of Queensland
- In office 12 November 2020 – 18 December 2023
- Premier: Annastacia Palaszczuk; Steven Miles
- Preceded by: New portfolio
- Succeeded by: Ali King (as Assistant Minister for Housing, Planning and Local Government)

Assistant Minister for Deputy Premier and Health of Queensland
- In office 11 May 2020 – 12 November 2020
- Premier: Annastacia Palaszczuk
- Preceded by: New portfolio
- Succeeded by: Julieanne Gilbert (as Assistant Minister for Health and Regional Health Infrastructure)

Member of the Queensland Legislative Assembly for Pine Rivers
- Incumbent
- Assumed office 31 January 2015
- Preceded by: Seath Holswich

Personal details
- Born: 20 May 1983 (age 43) Windsor, Queensland
- Party: Labor
- Spouse: Reece Pianta (divorced)
- Children: 1
- Profession: Early childhood educator Union official
- Website: www.nikkiboyd.com.au

Nikki Anne Boyd (born 20 May 1983) is an Australian politician. She has been the Australian Labor Party member for Pine Rivers in the Queensland Legislative Assembly since 2015.

== Early life ==
Prior to entering politics, Boyd was a lead organiser for the United Voice trade union, and an early childhood educator.

== Political career ==
She was first elected the member for the seat of Pine Rivers at 2015 election with a 21.3% swing. She was re-elected with swings to her in 2017 election and 2020 election.

Boyd served as the Deputy Government Whip in the Legislative Assembly of Queensland from 2017 to 2020.

In May 2020, Boyd was appointed as the Assistant Minister to the Deputy Premier and Health. Following the 2020 Queensland state election, she was appointed as the Assistant Minister for Local Government in the Third Palaszczuk Ministry. After Steven Miles succeeded Annastacia Palaszczuk as Premier in December 2023, she was appointed as the Minister for Fire and Disaster Recovery and the Minister for Corrective Services.

== See also ==
- Second Palaszczuk Ministry
- Third Palaszczuk Ministry

Parliament of Queensland
Preceded by Seath Holswich	Member for Pine Rivers; 2015–present	Incumbent
