= Steven Miles =

Premier of Queensland from 2023 to 2024

The Honourable Steven Miles MP
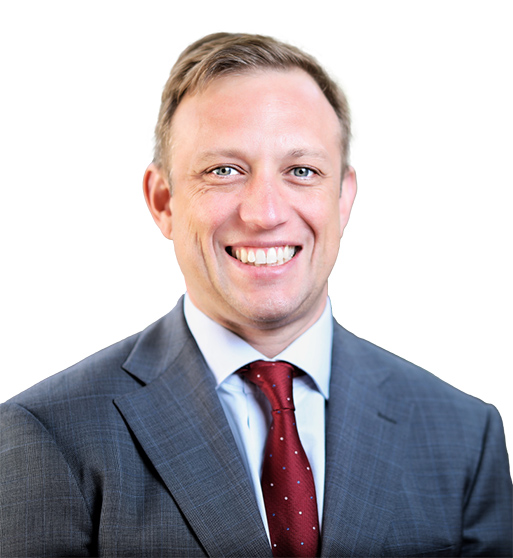
- Official portrait, 2023

Leader of the Opposition in Queensland
- Incumbent
- Assumed office 28 October 2024
- Premier: David Crisafulli
- Deputy: Cameron Dick
- Preceded by: David Crisafulli

40th Premier of Queensland
- In office 15 December 2023 – 28 October 2024
- Monarch: Charles III
- Governor: Jeannette Young
- Deputy: Cameron Dick
- Preceded by: Annastacia Palaszczuk
- Succeeded by: David Crisafulli

Leader of the Labor Party in Queensland
- Incumbent
- Assumed office 15 December 2023
- Deputy: Cameron Dick
- Preceded by: Annastacia Palaszczuk

Deputy Premier of Queensland
- In office 11 May 2020 – 15 December 2023
- Premier: Annastacia Palaszczuk
- Preceded by: Jackie Trad
- Succeeded by: Cameron Dick

Deputy Leader of the Labor Party in Queensland
- In office 11 May 2020 – 15 December 2023
- Leader: Annastacia Palaszczuk
- Preceded by: Jackie Trad
- Succeeded by: Cameron Dick
Ministerial positions
Minister for State Development, Infrastructure, Local Government and Planning
In office 13 November 2020 – 18 December 2023
Premier	Annastacia Palaszczuk; Himself
Preceded by	Kate Jones (State Development); Cameron Dick (Infrastructure and Planning); Stirling Hinchliffe (Local Government)
Succeeded by	Grace Grace (as Minister for State Development and Infrastructure); Meaghan Scanlon (as Minister for Housing, Planning and Local Government)
Minister for Health and Ambulance Services
In office 12 December 2017 – 12 November 2020
Premier	Annastacia Palaszczuk
Preceded by	Cameron Dick
Succeeded by	Yvette D'Ath
Minister for National Parks, The Great Barrier Reef and Environment and Heritage Protection
In office 16 February 2015 – 11 December 2017
Premier	Annastacia Palaszczuk
Preceded by	Andrew Powell (Environment and Heritage Protection); Steve Dickson (National Parks)
Succeeded by	Leeanne Enoch
Parliamentary offices
Member of the Legislative Assembly
Incumbent
Assumed office 25 November 2017
Preceded by	Chris Whiting
Constituency	Murrumba
In office 31 January 2015 – 25 November 2017
Preceded by	Saxon Rice
Succeeded by	Seat abolished
Constituency	Mount Coot-tha

Personal details
- Born: 15 November 1977 (age 49) Brisbane, Queensland, Australia
- Party: Labor
- Spouse: Kim McDowell
- Children: 3
- Education: Petrie State School; St Paul's Anglican School
- Alma mater: University of Queensland (PhD)

Steven John Miles (born 15 November 1977) is an Australian politician who served as the 40th premier of Queensland from 2023 to 2024. He has been the leader of the Queensland Labor Party since 2023 and the leader of the opposition in Queensland since 2024, and previously served as deputy premier from 2020 to 2023.

Miles was born in Brisbane and completed a PhD on the trade union movement at the University of Queensland. Prior to entering parliament he worked as a union official, political adviser, and public relations consultant. He was elected to parliament at the 2015 Queensland state election, initially representing the seat of Mount Coot-tha before switching to Murrumba at the 2017 election. Miles was appointed to state cabinet after the 2015 election victory and replaced Jackie Trad as Annastacia Palaszczuk's deputy in 2020. He succeeded Palaszcuk as ALP leader and premier unopposed following her retirement in December 2023.

Miles led his government into the 2024 state election in an attempt to win a fourth consecutive term for the Labor Party but was defeated by the opposition Liberal National Party led by David Crisafulli.

== Early life ==
Miles was born in Brisbane in 1977. His father worked as a fitter at the Golden Circle cannery at Northgate and his mother was a workplace health and safety inspector. He attended Petrie State School and completed his secondary education at St Paul's Anglican School, Bald Hills. He went on to complete the degrees of Bachelor of Arts (BA) and Doctor of Philosophy (PhD) at the University of Queensland. Miles' PhD thesis was titled "Trade Union Renewal in Australia: rebuilding worker involvement".

Miles was a co-founder and managing director of Reveille Strategy, a public relations agency working with progressive organisations to "mobilise for campaigns and trumpet their message to the community". Prior to his election to parliament he also worked as an adviser to state treasurer Andrew Fraser and as industrial relations director of state public sector union Together.

== Political career ==
Miles was initially a member of the Labor Right faction, but switched to Labor Left after he failed to win a preselection ballot for the seat of Pine Rivers prior to the 2009 Queensland state election. He was the unsuccessful Labor candidate for Ryan at the 2010 Australian federal election.

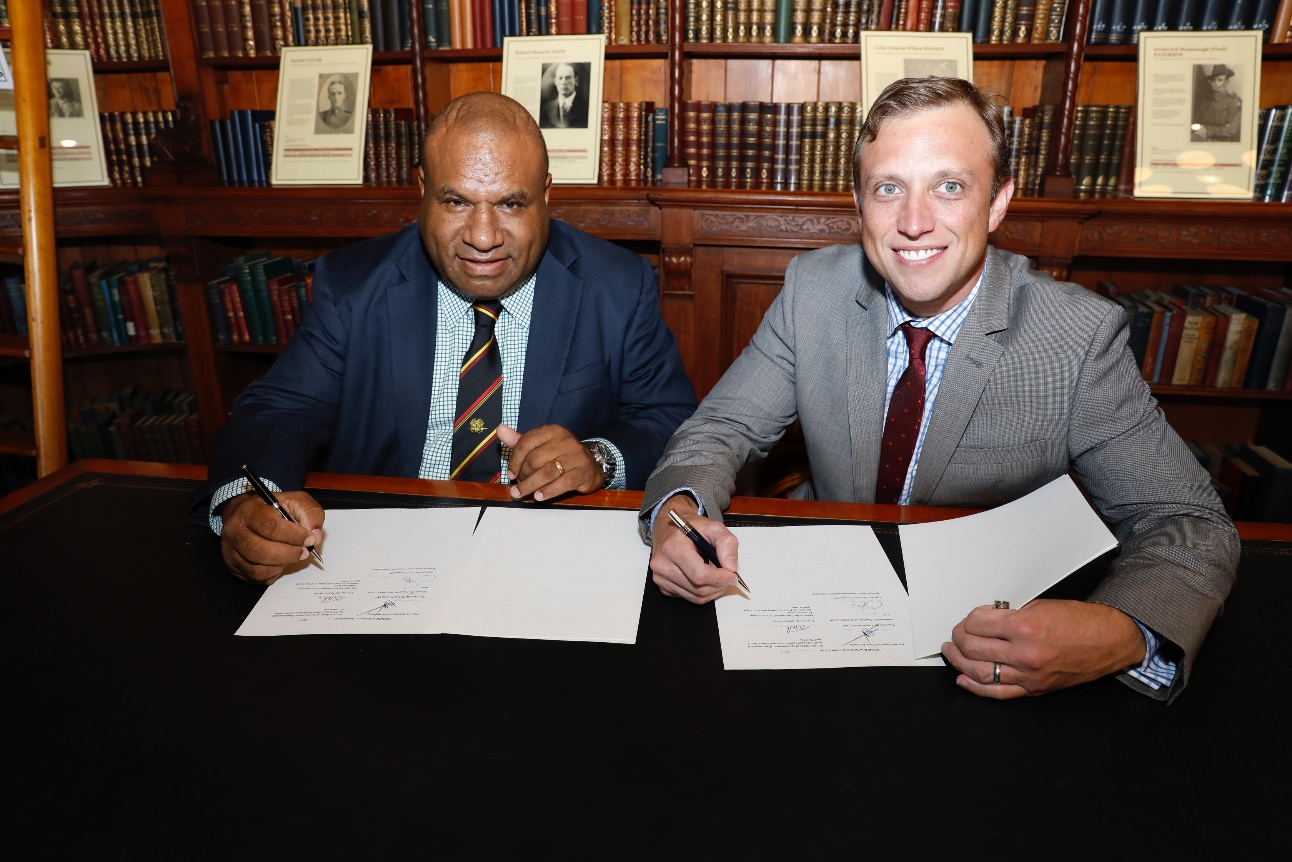
Miles in 2017 with Papua New Guinean tourism minister Tobias Kulang

Miles was first elected to state seat of Mount Coot-tha at the 2015 state election. He was sworn in as Minister for Environment and Heritage Protection and Minister for National Parks and the Great Barrier Reef in the First Palaszczuk ministry on 16 February 2015.

As Environment Minister, Miles announced Queensland's first container deposit scheme to improve recycling of can and bottles, which began operating in 2018.

Following an electoral redistribution in 2017 that abolished the seat of Mount Coot-tha, Miles stood for the North Brisbane electorate of Murrumba and was elected in the 2017 state election. He was appointed and sworn in as the Minister for Health and Ambulance Services in the Second Palaszczuk ministry after the election. He was health minister for the first months of the COVID-19 pandemic in Australia and in January 2020 declared a public health emergency, the first such declaration by an Australian state.

In May 2020, Miles was appointed Deputy Premier of Queensland, following the resignation of the previous Deputy Premier Jackie Trad. He continued to be Minister for Health and Ambulance Services until the 2020 state election, after which he was appointed the Minister for State Development, Infrastructure, Local Government and Planning in the Third Palaszczuk ministry.

=== Premier of Queensland ===
In December 2023, following Palaszczuk's resignation, Miles announced he would be a candidate to succeed her as state premier and ALP leader in Queensland. It was reported that he was aligned with the dominant left faction and enjoyed the support of the United Workers Union. He was initially opposed for the leadership by Shannon Fentiman, but Fentiman subsequently withdrew after a deal was struck between Miles and Cameron Dick of the right faction in which Dick would become deputy premier. He was elected unopposed on 15 December 2023 and sworn in as premier on the same day.

Miles' initial priorities as premier included addressing cost of living pressures, legislating stronger climate and emissions reductions targets, and reducing youth crime.

==== Cost of living ====
The Miles Government introduced a package of measures in 2024 to ease cost of living pressures including:

- 50 cent flat-rate fares on public transport across Queensland to save money for commuters and reduce road congestion. A six-month trial of 50 cent fares began on 5 August 2024. By September 2024, the trial has deemed successful with public transport patronage increasing beyond pre-pandemic levels. Miles committed to making 50 cent fares permanent if his Labor Government was re-elected.
- $1000 electricity rebate for all Queensland households. This was in addition to the $300 electricity rebate provided to households by the federal Albanese Government in the 2024 federal budget.
- 20 percent reduction in vehicle registration fees for 12 months.
- $200 vouchers to assist families with children aged 5–17 with the cost of membership and participation in sport.

The cost of living measures were funded by the State Government's progressive coal royalties regime, which provided an additional $9.4 billion in revenue to Queensland since it was introduced in 2022. The Miles Government passed legislation to protect progressive coal royalties being removed by a future LNP government.

In August 2024, Miles announced that a re-elected Labor Government would lower petrol prices by establishing 12 state-owned fuel stations to improve competition, as well as ban fuel stations from raising the price of fuel more than once a day, and require fuel stations to release price changes a day in advance.

==== Environment and climate change ====
Queensland saw a 35 percent reduction in greenhouse gas emissions in 2022, which beat the Labor Government's previous emissions target of 30 percent reduction by 2030. In 2024, the Miles Government passed the Clean Economy Jobs Act 2024 and Energy (Renewable Transformation and Jobs) Act 2024 to legislate stronger emissions reductions targets of 75 percent by 2035 and net zero by 2050, and set Queensland's renewable energy targets at 50 percent by 2030, 70 percent by 2032 and 80 percent by 2035. The legislation also entrenched public ownership of energy assets and established a $150 million Job Security Guarantee and Fund to ensure energy workers at existing publicly owned power stations and associated coal mines have access to new jobs and training or financial assistance during the State's transition to renewable energy.

At the 2024–25 State Budget, the Miles Government announced $26 billion over four years would be invested into renewable power, storage and transmission projects in Queensland, including $8.68 billion in 2024–25 alone. Miles also opposed the federal Liberal National Party proposal to support to introduce nuclear energy to Australia and construct nuclear reactors in Queensland.

In 2024, the Miles Government expanded environmental protection in Queensland by banning all carbon capture and storage in the Great Artesian Basin; protecting an additional 59,000 hectares of land by creating two new national parks (The Lakes National Park near Hughenden and Malbon Thompson Range National Park near Cairns) and expanding 18 existing national parks; and adding 140 islands or parts of islands within the Great Barrier Reef Marine Park to Queensland's protected areas estate.

==== Housing and homelessness ====
In 2024 Miles announced the $3.1 billion 'Homes for Queenslanders' plan to build one million new homes by 2046, including 53,000 new social homes. As part of that plan the Miles Government passed rental reform legislation that strengthen the rights of tenants, banned rent-bidding by real estate agents, created a portable bond scheme to allow tenants to transfer bond from one property to another. Miles also announced every specialist homelessness services in Queensland would receive a 20 percent increase in funding.

The Miles Government removed stamp duty for first homebuyers on properties valued up to $700,000.

==== Social policy ====
The Miles Government passed legislation in 2024 to decriminalise the sex work industry that repealed all previously existing criminal offences relating to sex work and improved the health, safety, and workplace rights of sex workers.

==== 2024 election ====
At the 2024 Queensland state election, Labor was defeated, losing 15 seats with a 7% two-party-preferred swing towards the Liberal National Party (LNP). Miles conceded the election on the night but initially held back on conceding to LNP leader David Crisafulli, claiming the LNP would not be able to form a majority. He conceded defeat to Crisafulli at a press conference the next day after the election was called in the LNP's favour, having won a majority.

Per state Labor Party rules, the defeat triggered an automatic leadership spill. Miles was re-elected unopposed as Labor leader, and hence Leader of the Opposition, after senior Labor MPs Cameron Dick and Shannon Fentiman chose not to contest the leadership.

2026 Contempt

Opposition Leader Steven Miles has apologised after he was found in contempt over deliberately misleading Queensland parliament. The parliament voted to find Mr Miles in contempt.

== Personal life ==
Miles has three children with his wife Kim McDowell. Miles supports the Brisbane Broncos.

Political offices
Preceded by Jackie Trad	Deputy Premier of Queensland; 2020–2023	Succeeded by Cameron Dick
Preceded by Annastacia Palaszczuk	Premier of Queensland; 2023–2024	Succeeded by David Crisafulli
Preceded by David Crisafulli	Leader of the Opposition in Queensland; 2024–present	Incumbent
Parliament of Queensland
Preceded by Saxon Rice	Member for Mount Coot-tha; 2015–2017	Abolished
Preceded by Chris Whiting	Member for Murrumba; 2017–present	Incumbent
Party political offices
Preceded by Jackie Trad	Deputy Leader of the Labor Party in Queensland; 2020–2023	Succeeded by Cameron Dick
Preceded by Annastacia Palaszczuk	Leader of the Labor Party in Queensland; 2023–present	Incumbent
