= Shannon Fentiman =

Australian politician

The Honourable Shannon Fentiman MP
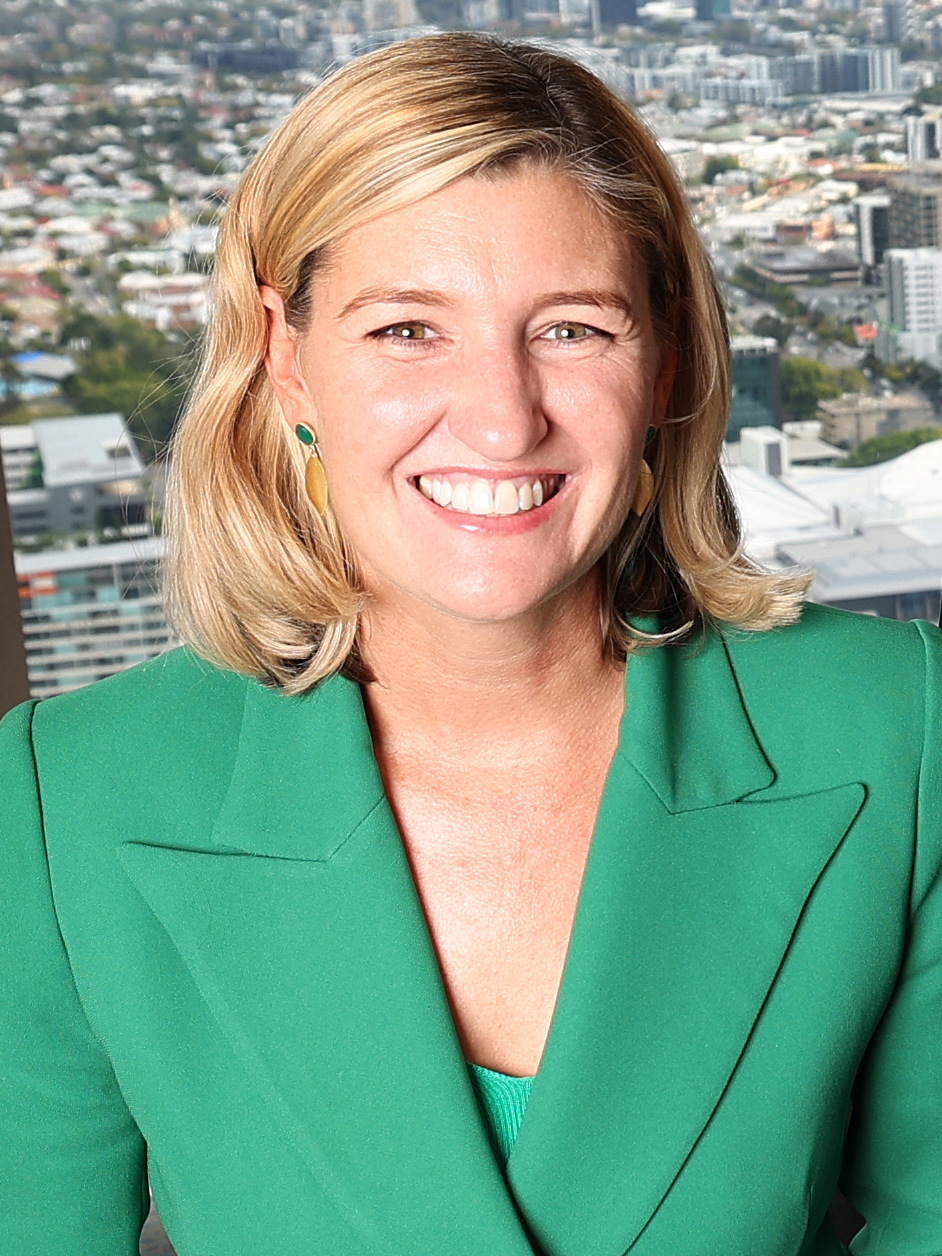
- Fentiman in 2023

Shadow Treasurer of Queensland
- Incumbent
- Assumed office 8 November 2024
- Leader: Steven Miles
- Preceded by: David Janetzki

Shadow Minister for Women of Queensland
- Incumbent
- Assumed office 8 November 2024
- Leader: Steven Miles
- Preceded by: Rosslyn Bates
Ministerial positions
Minister for Health, Mental Health and Ambulance Services (previously Minister for Health and Ambulance Services)
In office 18 May 2023 – 28 October 2024
| Premier | Annastacia Palaszczuk Steven Miles |
| Preceded by | Yvette D’Ath |
| Succeeded by | Tim Nicholls |
Attorney-General and Minister for Justice
In office 12 November 2020 – 17 May 2023
| Premier | Annastacia Palaszczuk |
| Preceded by | Yvette D'Ath |
| Succeeded by | Yvette D'Ath |
Minister for Women
In office 12 November 2020 – 28 October 2024
| Premier | Annastacia Palaszczuk Steven Miles |
| Preceded by | Di Farmer |
| Succeeded by | Fiona Simpson |
Minister for the Prevention of Domestic and Family Violence
In office 12 November 2020 – 17 May 2023
| Premier | Annastacia Palaszczuk |
| Preceded by | Position established |
| Succeeded by | Yvette D'Ath |
Minister for Employment and Small Business
In office 12 December 2017 – 11 November 2020
| Premier | Annastacia Palaszczuk |
| Preceded by | Grace Grace |
| Succeeded by | Di Farmer |
Minister for Training and Skills Development
In office 12 December 2017 – 11 November 2020
| Premier | Annastacia Palaszczuk |
| Preceded by | Yvette D'Ath |
| Succeeded by | Di Farmer |
Minister for Communities, Women and Youth
In office 16 February 2015 – 11 December 2017
| Premier | Annastacia Palaszczuk |
| Preceded by | Tracy Davis (Communities) |
| Succeeded by | Di Farmer (Women and Youth); Coralee O'Rourke (Communities) |
Minister for Child Safety
In office 16 February 2015 – 11 December 2017
| Premier | Annastacia Palaszczuk |
| Preceded by | Tracy Davis |
| Succeeded by | Di Farmer |
Minister for Multicultural Affairs
In office 16 February 2015 – 8 December 2015
| Premier | Annastacia Palaszczuk |
| Preceded by | Mike Latter |
| Succeeded by | Grace Grace |

Member of the Queensland Legislative Assembly for Waterford
- Incumbent
- Assumed office 31 January 2015

Personal details
- Party: Labor
- Spouse: Matt Collins
- Children: 2
- Education: Queensland University of Technology; University of Melbourne
- Profession: Solicitor; Politician
- Website: www.shannonfentiman.com

Shannon Maree Fentiman is an Australian politician. She has been the Labor member for Waterford in the Queensland Legislative Assembly since 2015. Fentiman has previously served as the Minister for Women and Minister for Health, Mental Health and Ambulance Services.

== Early life and career ==
Born in 1983/84, she holds a Bachelor of Laws (First class honours) from Queensland University of Technology and Master of Laws from the University of Melbourne. She attended Marymount College, Gold Coast.

Prior to her election to the Queensland Parliament, Fentiman worked as a solicitor for Hall Payne Lawyers. She has previously worked as an industrial advocate for the Australian Manufacturing Workers Union and as a judge's associate in the Supreme Court of Queensland to Justice Atkinson.

Fentiman has also been a board member of the Logan Women's Health and Wellbeing Centre, Secretary of the Centre Against Sexual Violence in Logan and the Duty Solicitor at the Beenleigh Neighbourhood Centre.

== Political career ==
Fentiman stood for Waterford in 2015 after the previous Labor Member Evan Moorhead lost the seat in the 2012 LNP landslide. Waterford was Campbell Newman Government's third most marginal seat held seat by Mike Latter. Fentiman achieved a 14.3% swing towards her, making Waterford once more a safe Labor seat. Fentiman became a first term minister and was sworn in as Minister for Communities, Women and Youth, Minister for Child Safety and Minister for Multicultural Affairs in the Palaszczuk Ministry on 16 February 2015.

After the Palaszczuk Government was re-elected on 25 November 2017, Fentiman was elevated to be the Minister for Employment and Small Business and Minister for Training and Skills Development. She is also the Ministerial Champion for the Torres Strait.

In December 2023, Fentiman ran to replace outgoing Premier Annastacia Palaszczuk in the 2023 Queensland Labor Party leadership election, however she withdrew her candidacy after the Labor Right faction announced their support for her opponent, Deputy Premier Steven Miles, denying her the backing of a majority of Queensland Labor Members of Parliament.

=== Child safety ===
In September 2016, the State Opposition called for Fentiman's sacking as a Minister following a number of deaths of children in foster care or within the child safety system. Two months later, an independent review found misconduct and catastrophic failures by her department in relation to the deaths of seven children. In response, Fentiman said she still had confidence in her department's executive staff. Some two weeks later, it was revealed that three child protection staff had been stood down, and a further nine were subject to disciplinary proceedings following the death of 21 month old Mason Jet Lee in June 2016. The child died with injuries from head to toe after being released from hospital just three months earlier.

In 2016, Fentiman announced "zero tolerance" drug testing for parents "where there is any suspicion of drug use", with particular reference to amphetamines. Fentiman stated that parents would be required to consent to an Intervention with Parental Agreement before undergoing testing.

In 2017, Fentiman announced the hiring an additional 300 Child Safety Staff members to address understaffing issues. At the time, Queensland had the highest rate of child deaths of any state in Australia, and was exceeded only by the Northern Territory.

During the 2017 Queensland state election, it was revealed that a man with child pornography convictions was employed in her office. Fentiman said she was "completely shocked and horrified as everyone else". The man had worked there "for less than a month". The staffer had been convicted in 2011 for accessing over 60 images.

=== LGBTIQ rights ===
Fentiman as the Child Safety Minister paved the way in Queensland to allow same sex couples to adopt children with legislation passing the Queensland Parliament on 3 November 2016, with both the Liberal National Party and Katter Australia Party opposing the legislation. LNP spokesperson Ros Bates said that there was no need for the bill.

Fentiman supports Trans rights and is opposed to the Gender-critical movement.

=== Free TAFE ===
Fentiman as Minister for Training and Skills Development introduced free TAFE for school leavers in 2018 and subsequently the free apprenticeship program in 2019 to allow young people access training in key priority areas.

=== Meriba Omasker Kaziw Kazipa Act 2020 ===
In 2017, Fentiman and the then-candidate for Cook Cynthia Lui announced an election commitment to new laws to recognise Torres Strait Island families' use of traditional adoption. For generations, Torres Strait Islanders have supported their children and each other with traditional parenting approaches known more recently as "Kupai omasker". Under the practice, children can be given to other members of the community for a range of reasons, including the maintenance of family inheritance rights, provide an infertile couple with the opportunity to raise a child, strengthen alliances or distribute children of different sexes more fairly. Their guardianship can be transferred to other members of the community, typically extended family.

There had been a problem in Queensland law, where such adoptions were not legally recognised by the state's Succession Act 1981, with one issue being that adopted children are not able to take on the surname of their adoptive parents. On 17 July 2020 the Queensland Government introduced a bill in parliament to legally recognise the practice. The bill was passed as the Meriba Omasker Kaziw Kazipa Act 2020 ("For Our Children's Children") on 8 September 2020.

Parliament of Queensland
| Preceded by Mike Latter | Member for Waterford; 2015–present | Incumbent |
