= Annastacia Palaszczuk =

Premier of Queensland from 2015 to 2023

The Honourable Annastacia Palaszczuk AC
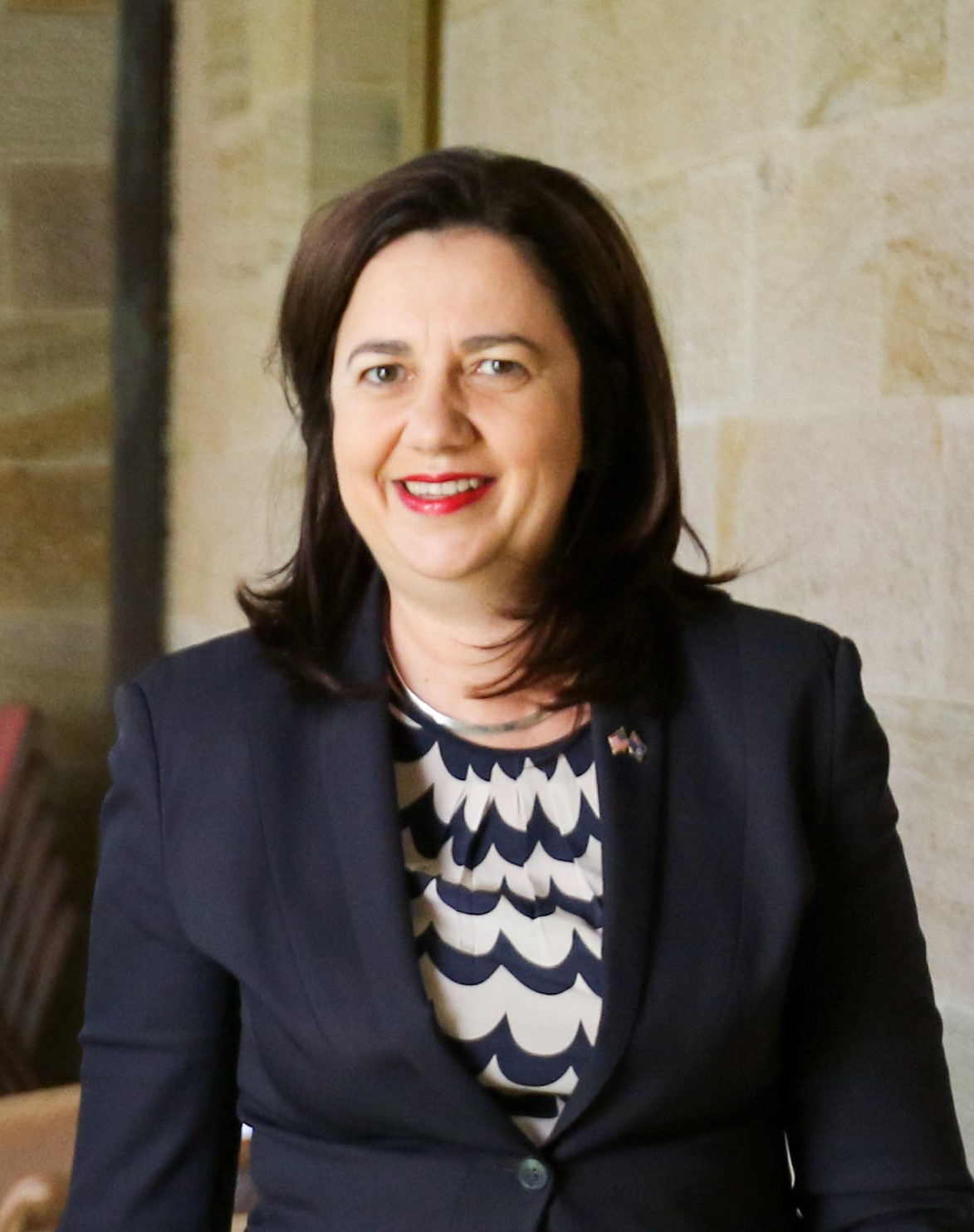
- Palaszczuk in 2016

39th Premier of Queensland
- In office 14 February 2015 – 15 December 2023
- Monarchs: Elizabeth II; Charles III
- Governor: Paul de Jersey; Jeannette Young
- Deputy: Jackie Trad; Steven Miles
- Preceded by: Campbell Newman
- Succeeded by: Steven Miles

Member of the Legislative Assembly for Inala
- In office 9 September 2006 – 31 December 2023
- Preceded by: Henry Palaszczuk
- Succeeded by: Margie Nightingale
Leadership positions
Leader of the Labor Party in Queensland
In office 28 March 2012 – 15 December 2023
Deputy	Tim Mulherin; Jackie Trad; Steven Miles
Preceded by	Anna Bligh
Succeeded by	Steven Miles
Leader of the Opposition in Queensland
In office 28 March 2012 – 14 February 2015
Premier	Campbell Newman
Deputy	Tim Mulherin
Preceded by	Jeff Seeney
Succeeded by	Lawrence Springborg
Cabinet positions
Minister for Transport
In office 21 February 2011 – 26 March 2012
Premier	Anna Bligh
Preceded by	Rachel Nolan
Succeeded by	Scott Emerson
Minister for Multicultural Affairs
In office 26 March 2009 – 26 March 2012
Premier	Anna Bligh
Preceded by	Lindy Nelson-Carr
Succeeded by	Jack Dempsey
Minister for Disability Services
In office 26 March 2009 – 21 February 2011
Premier	Anna Bligh
Preceded by	Lindy Nelson-Carr
Succeeded by	Curtis Pitt

Personal details
- Born: 25 July 1969 (age 57) Durack, Queensland, Australia
- Party: Labor
- Spouses: George Megalogenis (m. 1996; div. 1998); Simon Every (m. 2004; div. 2009)
- Domestic partners: Shaun Drabsch (2015–2018); Reza Adib (since 2021)
- Parents: Henry Palaszczuk (father); Lorelle Palaszczuk (mother)
- Education: Jamboree Heights State School; St Mary's College
- Alma mater: University of Queensland (BA, LLB); London School of Economics (MA); Australian National University (GDLP)
- Occupation: Policy adviser; Politician
- Cabinet: Palaszczuk Ministry

Annastacia Palaszczuk AC (/ˈpæləʃeɪ/ PAL-ə-shay, born 25 July 1969) is an Australian politician who served as the 39th premier of Queensland from 2015 to 2023. She held office as the leader of the Queensland branch of the Australian Labor Party (ALP) from 2012 until her resignation, and was a member of the Legislative Assembly of Queensland (MLA) for the division of Inala from 2006 to 2023. Palaszczuk is the fifth-most-tenured premier in Queensland state history and the first woman to win the premiership from opposition, she also presided over the first majority female cabinet in Australian state and federal history.

Palaszczuk was a political adviser before her election to the Legislative Assembly, succeeding her father Henry Palaszczuk in the seat of Inala. She held several roles in the Bligh Government from 2009 to 2012, when Queensland Labor suffered a historic defeat. One of only seven remaining Labor Assembly Members, Palaszczuk was elected unopposed as the Leader of Queensland Labor, becoming Leader of the Opposition.

Despite Labor's heavy loss in 2012, Palaszczuk led Labor to victory at the 2015 election, becoming the first woman in Australian history to become a state premier from opposition. Her first ministry was majority female, also a first in Australia. She went on to lead Labor to increased majorities at the 2017 and 2020 elections, making her the first Australian female premier to win three terms.

On 10 December 2023, Palaszczuk announced her resignation as Premier. She resigned as Premier on 15 December, with then-Deputy Premier Steven Miles sworn in to succeed her on the same day. She left parliament at the end of the month.

== Early life and education ==
Palaszczuk was raised in the Brisbane suburb of Durack. Her father, veteran state Labor MP Henry Pałaszczuk, was born in Germany to Polish parents. Her Australian mother, Lorelle, is descended from German settlers. She attended St Mary's College, Ipswich from 1982 to 1986. She has degrees in Arts and Laws from the University of Queensland, a Masters of Arts from the London School of Economics (where she was a Chevening Scholar), and a Graduate Diploma of Legal Practice from Australian National University.

== Early political career ==
Palaszczuk worked as a policy adviser to a number of Labor ministers, including Minister for Communities, Disabilities and Seniors, Warren Pitt and former Minister for the Environment, Dean Wells. She later decided to have a career in the legal profession and was studying for admission as a solicitor when her father announced his intention to retire at the 2006 election.

In the wake of her father's retirement, Palaszczuk contested and won Labor preselection for his seat of Inala in south-west Brisbane, the safest Labor seat in Queensland, and was elected with a margin of more than 30 points.

On 9 October 2008, Palaszczuk was appointed Parliamentary Secretary to the Minister for Main Roads and Local Government in the wake of Ronan Lee's defection to the Greens. Just over five months later, she was appointed Minister for Disability Services and Multicultural Affairs in the Bligh ministry following the 2009 election. In February 2011, she was promoted to Minister for Transport and Multicultural Affairs.

Palaszczuk is a member of Labor Right faction.

== Leader of the Opposition ==
At the 2012 election, the Bligh government was overwhelmingly defeated by the Liberal National Party led by Campbell Newman, losing 44 seats. Palaszczuk lost over 17 per cent of her primary vote from 2009, but retained her seat with a 46.2 per cent primary vote and a 56.9 per cent two-party vote, representing a 14 per cent swing from 2009.

The day after the election, Bligh resigned as premier and party leader and retired from politics. Palaszczuk, as one of only three surviving members of Bligh's cabinet, announced that she would be a candidate to succeed Bligh. Curtis Pitt initially said he would stand, but withdrew. This left Palaszczuk to take the leadership unopposed at a meeting of the Labor Caucus on 28 March in Ipswich. Bligh did not attend the meeting. Tim Mulherin was elected Deputy Leader, also unopposed.

Palaszczuk faced the task of rebuilding a party which had just suffered the worst defeat of a sitting government in Queensland history, and amongst the worst that a governing party has ever suffered at the state level in Australia. She also faced the difficulty of leading an opposition caucus of only seven members, two short of official status (though Newman subsequently promised that Labor would have the full rights and resources entitled to the official opposition). After taking the leadership, Palaszczuk said, 'We need to make ourselves relevant to voters. We need to get back to our basics. Workers' rights, protecting the environment, investment in education—these are core Labor principles and somewhere along the way we simply lost our way'. She also said, 'I'm under no illusion of the task ahead, of the rebuild that we need to do and the fact that we need to restore people's faith in the Queensland Labor Party'.

Following her election, Palaszczuk apologised for 'breaching the trust of Queenslanders', a reference to the Bligh government's decision to sell off state assets after promising not to do so at the 2009 election. This decision had been 'poorly communicated to the community', she said, 'There were other issues, but that is the single point where we lost faith with the community. For that I apologise'. Palaszczuk defended the decision itself, saying it was made to save jobs across the state, but conceded that the Government should have been more open more quickly regarding the policy.

On 29 March 2012, Palaszczuk announced that she would support the state parliamentary term being extended to four years, as is the case in the other Australian states. Newman indicated he supported the move as well.

== Premier of Queensland ==
Palaszczuk is the first Premier of Queensland to have Polish heritage.

=== First term: 2015–2017 ===
==== 2015 election ====
During her time as opposition leader, Palaszczuk closed the two-party gap between Labor and the LNP, and on several occasions outpolled Newman as preferred premier. Despite this, most commentators gave Labor little chance of winning the 2015 state election. Labor needed a 36-seat swing to make Palaszczuk Queensland's second female premier and Australia's first female premier elected from opposition, a task thought nearly impossible given that the party only went into the election with nine seats (having won two seats from the LNP in by-elections).

However, in a result that surprised even the most optimistic Labor observers, Labor won a 12-point swing, and projections on election night saw the party very close to winning a majority government. Depending on the source, Labor was either two or three seats short of outright victory. Labor also ousted Newman in his own seat, something that had only happened to a sitting Premier once before in Queensland's history. The final result saw 44 Labor seats and 42 LNP seats. The balance of power rested with the lone independent in the chamber, Peter Wellington, and the two MPs from Katter's Australian Party. On 5 February, Wellington announced his support for a Labor government under Palaszczuk, giving Labor 45 of 89 seats, a parliamentary majority of one. Palaszczuk herself reverted Inala to its previous status as a comfortably safe Labor seat, scoring an 18-point swing to increase her majority to 25 per cent, the second safest in the state.

On 9 February 2015, with projections showing Labor assured of at least a minority government, Palaszczuk said she intended to meet with Governor Paul de Jersey on 11 February and advise him that she could form a government. Hours after the results were declared, de Jersey formally invited Palaszczuk to form a government. She was sworn in on 14 February 2015. It was only the seventh change of government in Queensland since 1915.

==== Public service ====
During Palaszczuk's 2015 election campaign, she made public servants and stopping cuts to public service a key priority.

Budgets released by the Labor government has generally increased funding and have been well received in terms of health and education; however, budget focus on public servants and unemployment have received mixed reviews.

The Palaszczuk government prioritised public-servant job creation during her first term of government. Over her two completed terms of government, the public service gained 30,000 workers, a larger growth rate than the population.

==== Electoral reforms ====
Successful amendments to the electoral act through legislation and referendums in early 2016 included: adding an additional four parliamentary seats from 89 to 93, changing from optional preferential voting to full-preferential voting, and moving from unfixed three-year terms to fixed four-year terms.

=== Second term: 2017–2020 ===
==== 2017 election ====
Palaszczuk led Labor into the 2017 Queensland state election in hopes of winning a second term. Polls suggested the race would be close.

The result was not known for almost two weeks. Eleven days after the election, ABC election analyst Antony Green's election computer indicated that the incumbent Labor minority government had won at least 47 of the 93 seats in the expanded Legislative Assembly, enough to form a majority government. Labor ultimately won 48 seats, a net four-seat swing in its favour, allowing it to form government in its own right by two seats.

==== Climate change and environment ====
Palaszczuk's environmental policies included the introduction a ban on single-use plastic bags and the implementation of a container refunding recycling scheme, with support from the LNP opposition.

In May 2018, after achieving a parliamentary majority, Palaszczuk passed legislation for a suite of new laws on land clearing restriction, with its deforestation rate being the worst in the country. The debate was supposedly so heated that debate was extended to 10:30 p.m. in order for extra time to debate the legislation. Local environmental groups praised the legislation, whilst agriculture businesses protested outside the Queensland Parliament opposing the land-clearing laws.

Palaszczuk launched Labor's climate change plan to achieve 50% renewables by 2030, and carbon neutrality by 2050.

==== LGBT rights ====
On 11 May 2017, the Queensland Parliament made an official apology to the people who were convicted of homosexual offences during its period of criminalisation. She supports same-sex marriage and campaigned for the 'yes' vote during the national plebiscite. Palaszczuk supported and helped pass legislation on 13 August 2020 that would ban gay conversion therapy, which would see health practitioners who attempt the practice jailed up to 18 months.

==== Abortion ====
On 17 October 2018, the Parliament passed the Termination of Pregnancy Act, which would legalise abortions up to 22 weeks of gestation and establish 150-metre safe zones around abortion clinics.

==== Carmichael coal mine ====
Palaszczuk has been the subject of controversy from local environmental groups for supporting the Carmichael coal mine.

The mine has come to significant controversy due to its potential environmental damage and its impact on climate change. Opposition to the mine led to the creation and growth of the Stop Adani campaign, which is as of 2024 a movement of thousands of individuals and community groups across Australia.

Before the 2019 federal election, Palaszczuk was accused by both environmentalists and the coal mining industry of stalling the process of approval. Ultimately, the federal election saw a large swing away from Labor in Queensland, which sparked speculation that Palaszczuk could lose government in the next election. However, Palaszczuk's government won another term in 2020, winning additional seats.

Palaszczuk signed off on a deal for Adani to defer royalty payments for an unspecified amount of time in October 2020, sparking criticism from the Greens. The deal delays some payments but all royalty taxes must be paid. Treasurer Cameron Dick said: 'I can assure you that Adani will pay every dollar in royalties that they have to pay to the people of Queensland—with interest'.

==== COVID-19 pandemic ====
Queensland detected its first positive case of COVID-19 on 28 January 2020. A day later, Palaszczuk declared a public health emergency. The state recorded its first death from the virus on 13 March.

Palaszczuk announced lockdown measures and state border closures from 23 March, as confirmed cases follow the worldwide trend of skyrocketing. Non-essential services were banned from operating, and schools and universities shut down. As 'the curve' began to flatten, Palaszczuk proceeded to gradually ease restrictions from late April, with Queensland easing most coronavirus restrictions by July.

The most controversial part of the pandemic restrictions were state border closures. After being lifted to all bar Victoria in July, the border was shut to NSW and ACT again in early August after a small spike in cases in these areas. The state border closures met prominent criticism from NSW Premier Gladys Berejiklian, ACT Chief Minister Andrew Barr and Prime Minister Scott Morrison, particularly after a Canberra woman was denied entry into Queensland to attend her father's funeral. Borders were gradually lifted as cases began to ease in NSW and Victoria, until full border openings to the states on 1 December.

Despite criticism of the state border closures from outside sources, Palaszczuk recorded high approval ratings amongst Queensland voters, recording 65% satisfaction on one Newspoll.

During the COVID-19 pandemic, Palaszczuk announced and passed legislation for a public servant wage freeze to start from the beginning of the financial year, with Palaszczuk claiming it was necessary for future job security and creation. The Greens and LNP opposed the freeze, with Shadow Treasurer Tim Mander declaring the situation a 'debacle'.

In 2025, Palaszczuk was interviewed for the project about Australian responses to the Covid-19 pandemic. The recording can be found at the National Library of Australia.

=== Third term: 2020–2023 ===
==== 2020 election ====
Palaszczuk led Queensland Labor to the 2020 election and was challenged by the LNP opposition led by Deb Frecklington.

Palaszczuk entered the 2020 election in a strong position, and was immensely popular amongst Queenslanders and voters, with her approval rating often soaring above 60%. In contrast, the LNP leader Deb Frecklington became increasingly unpopular amongst voters, trailing Palaszczuk as preferred premier by around 20 points and suffering negative net approval ratings.

In order to divert voters from Frecklington's unpopularity, LNP aired many negative ads including unpopular former Deputy Premier Jackie Trad, labelling her as 'Dodgy Jackie' and claiming she would become premier in a leadership spill if Labor were to win the election. Labor's campaign exploited Frecklington's unpopularity and claimed her government would echo the fairly unpopular Newman government.

Although Deputy Premier Jackie Trad was defeated in her seat of South Brisbane, it was the only seat the government lost in the election. Labor picked up four seats; winning 52, the LNP opposition winning just 34, a net loss of five. Along the way, Labor won all but five of Brisbane's 40 seats, their best showing in the capital since 2009. Palaszczuk declared victory on the night of the election, with Frecklington conceding and resigning from leadership the next day.

==== Euthanasia ====
During the 2020 election campaign, Palaszczuk announced her government would legalise euthanasia by February 2021, in spite of opposition from the Liberal National Party of Queensland. Many claimed that Palaszczuk's approach to the issue was simply to gain votes from marginal seats, which Palaszczuk denied.

==== Youth justice laws ====
In 2021, Palaszczuk announced a range of 'tough' new measures aimed at youth offenders. This included enhanced police powers, stricter anti-hooning laws, reversing the presumption of bail for certain offences and GPS ankle monitors.

In 2021, the Palaszczuk government passed legislation giving police the power to stop and search persons without reasonable suspicion with the intention of reducing knife carrying primarily by young people.

In 2022, Palaszczuk announced another range of measures including the construction of two new youth detention centres, a fast-track sentencing program, a range of increased penalties and high-visibility police patrols.

==== Renewable energy ====
In 2022, Palaszczuk put forward a $62 billion, ten-year clean energy plan. The plan would use solar and wind power as well as hydro storage technology to provide eight times more renewable energy than is currently available. Under the plan, 80 per cent of Queensland's power would come from renewable sources by 2035 and the largest hydro storage facility in the world would be built west of Mackay.

==== Retirement ====
On 10 December 2023, Palaszczuk announced she would retire from politics. She endorsed her Deputy, Steven Miles, who succeeded her as leader of the Labor Party and Premier on 15 December.

== Honours and recognition ==
Palaszczuk was appointed a Companion of the Order of Australia in the 2026 Australia Day Honours for "eminent service to the people and Parliament of Queensland, particularly as Premier, to educational equity, to multiculturalism, and to public health".

== Personal life ==
Palaszczuk was married to journalist George Megalogenis from 1996 to 1998, and to Simon Every, who was then-senator Joe Ludwig's chief of staff, from 2004 to 2009. From 2015 to 2018, her partner was Shaun Drabsch, an infrastructure adviser. During the 2017 Queensland election, Drabsch was alleged to have a conflict of interest over Adani Group's Carmichael coal mine. Palaszczuk and Drabsch amicably split in February 2018.

Since September 2021, Palaszczuk has been in a relationship with Dr Reza Adib, a weight-loss surgeon based in Brisbane.

In August 2024 Palaszczuk was appointed to the board of Australia Post.

In October 2025 Palaszczuk was elected to The University of Queensland's 36th Senate for a four-year term, as a graduate of the university.

In April 2026, Palaszczuk released a book titled Annastacia Palaszczuk: The Politics of Being Me through HarperCollins.

== See also ==
- List of female heads of government in Australia
- Political families of Australia

Parliament of Queensland
Preceded by Henry Palaszczuk	Member for Inala; 2006–2023	Succeeded by Margie Nightingale
Political offices
Preceded by Lindy Nelson-Carr	Minister for Disability Services; 2009–2011	Succeeded by Curtis Pitt
Preceded by Lindy Nelson-Carr	Minister for Multicultural Affairs; 2009–2012	Succeeded by Jack Dempsey
Preceded by Rachel Nolan	Minister for Transport; 2011–2012	Succeeded by Scott Emerson
Preceded by Jeff Seeney	Leader of the Opposition in Queensland; 2012–2015	Succeeded by Lawrence Springborg
Preceded by Campbell Newman	Premier of Queensland; 2015–2023	Succeeded by Steven Miles
Party political offices
Preceded by Anna Bligh	Leader of the Labor Party in Queensland; 2012–2023	Succeeded by Steven Miles
