= Post-election pendulum for the 2024 Queensland state election =

The following is a Mackerras pendulum for the 2024 Queensland state election.

"Safe" seats require a swing of over 10 per cent to change, "fairly safe" seats require a swing of between 6 and 10 per cent, while "marginal" seats require a swing of less than 6 per cent.

Government seats (52)
Marginal
Pumicestone	Ariana Doolan	LNP	0.4
Mirani	Glen Kelly	LNP	1.0 v KAP
Caloundra	Kendall Morton	LNP	1.8
Rockhampton	Donna Kirkland	LNP	1.8
Capalaba	Russell Field	LNP	1.9
Redlands	Rebecca Young	LNP	1.9
Mulgrave	Terry James	LNP	2.7
Nicklin	Marty Hunt	LNP	2.7
Maryborough	John Barounis	LNP	2.8
Redcliffe	Kerri-Anne Dooley	LNP	2.9
Clayfield	Tim Nicholls	LNP	3.5
Barron River	Bree James	LNP	3.7
Cook	David Kempton	LNP	5.0
Everton	Tim Mander	LNP	5.3
Moggill	Christian Rowan	LNP	5.6
Townsville	Adam Baillie	LNP	5.6
Fairly safe
Hervey Bay	David Lee	LNP	8.4
Chatsworth	Steve Minnikin	LNP	8.5
Mundingburra	Janelle Poole	LNP	9.2
Buderim	Brent Mickelberg	LNP	9.3
Thuringowa	Natalie Marr	LNP	9.9
Safe
Coomera	Michael Crandon	LNP	10.0
Glass House	Andrew Powell	LNP	10.2
Mackay	Nigel Dalton	LNP	10.2
Keppel	Nigel Hutton	LNP	10.5
Ninderry	Dan Purdie	LNP	10.5
Maroochydore	Fiona Simpson	LNP	10.9
Southport	Rob Molhoek	LNP	11.1
Oodgeroo	Amanda Stoker	LNP	11.8
Currumbin	Laura Gerber	LNP	12.3
Kawana	Jarrod Bleijie	LNP	12.7
Burleigh	Hermann Vorster	LNP	12.8
Theodore	Mark Boothman	LNP	13.0
Toowoomba South	David Janetzki	LNP	13.0
Mermaid Beach	Ray Stevens	LNP	13.1
Bonney	Sam O'Connor	LNP	13.7
Mudgeeraba	Ros Bates	LNP	13.9
Gympie	Tony Perrett	LNP	14.8
Burnett	Stephen Bennett	LNP	15.4
Burdekin	Dale Last	LNP	15.8
Scenic Rim	Jon Krause	LNP	16.1
Toowoomba North	Trevor Watts	LNP	16.5
Whitsunday	Amanda Camm	LNP	18.5
Southern Downs	James Lister	LNP	18.6 v ONP
Lockyer	Jim McDonald	LNP	19.2
Very safe
Gregory	Sean Dillon	LNP	21.0
Broadwater	David Crisafulli	LNP	21.3
Nanango	Deb Frecklington	LNP	22.9
Surfers Paradise	John-Paul Langbroek	LNP	23.1
Callide	Bryson Head	LNP	23.2
Condamine	Pat Weir	LNP	23.6
Warrego	Ann Leahy	LNP	27.8

Opposition seats (36)
Marginal
Aspley	Bart Mellish	ALP	0.04
Gaven	Meaghan Scanlon	ALP	0.7
Pine Rivers	Nikki Boyd	ALP	0.7
Bundaberg	Tom Smith	ALP	1.5
Macalister	Melissa McMahon	ALP	1.9
Springwood	Mick de Brenni	ALP	2.1
Cairns	Michael Healy	ALP	2.5
Lytton	Joan Pease	ALP	3.0
Ipswich West	Wendy Bourne	ALP	3.9
Logan	Linus Power	ALP	4.3
Mansfield	Corrine McMillan	ALP	4.9
Stafford	Jimmy Sullivan	ALP	5.3
Kurwongbah	Shane King	ALP	5.9
Fairly safe
Bancroft	Chris Whiting	ALP	6.0
South Brisbane	Barbara O'Shea	ALP	6.1 v GRN
Morayfield	Mark Ryan	ALP	7.1
Mount Ommaney	Jess Pugh	ALP	7.3
Algester	Leeanne Enoch	ALP	7.5
Ferny Grove	Mark Furner	ALP	7.9
Bulimba	Di Farmer	ALP	8.2
McConnel	Grace Grace	ALP	8.8
Ipswich	Jennifer Howard	ALP	8.9
Toohey	Peter Russo	ALP	9.0
Gladstone	Glenn Butcher	ALP	9.2
Stretton	James Martin	ALP	9.5
Sandgate	Bisma Asif	ALP	9.6
Greenslopes	Joe Kelly	ALP	9.8
Murrumba	Steven Miles	ALP	9.8
Jordan	Charis Mullen	ALP	9.9
Safe
Miller	Mark Bailey	ALP	10.6
Cooper	Jonty Bush	ALP	11.2
Waterford	Shannon Fentiman	ALP	11.3
Nudgee	Leanne Linard	ALP	12.0
Inala	Margie Nightingale	ALP	12.6
Bundamba	Lance McCallum	ALP	13.8
Woodridge	Cameron Dick	ALP	18.3
Crossbench seats (5)
Maiwar	Michael Berkman	GRN	3.4 v LNP
Noosa	Sandy Bolton	IND	8.5 v LNP
Hinchinbrook	Nick Dametto	KAP	13.2 v LNP
Hill	Shane Knuth	KAP	13.7 v LNP
Traeger	Robbie Katter	KAP	13.7 v LNP
