= Results of the 2024 Queensland state election =

This is a list of election results for the 2024 Queensland state election.

== Results summary ==
36	1	1	3	52
ALP	GRN	IND	KAP	LNP

Legislative Assembly (IRV) – Turnout TBD (CV)
Party	Votes	%	Swing	Seats	+/–
Liberal National	1,289,535	41.52	+5.63	52	▲17
Labor	1,011,211	32.56	−7.01	36	▼15
Greens	307,178	9.89	+0.42	1	▼1
One Nation	248,334	8.00	+0.88	0	Steady
Katter's Australian	75,773	2.44	–0.08	3	▼1
Family First	57,826	1.86	+1.86	0	Steady
Independents	52,657	1.69	−0.79	1	Steady
Legalise Cannabis	49,621	1.60	+0.69	0	Steady
Animal Justice	9,669	0.31	−0.03	0	Steady
Libertarian	4,141	0.13	+0.13	0	Steady
Formal votes	3,105,945	96.10	−0.50		
Informal votes	126,023	3.90	+0.50		
Total	3,231,968	100		93	
Registered voters / turnout	3,683,368	87.74	−0.17		
Two-party-preferred vote
Liberal National	1,669,799	53.8	+7.0		
Labor	1,436,146	46.2	−7.0		

== Results by electoral district ==
=== Algester ===
2024 Queensland state election: Algester
Party	Candidate	Votes	%	±%
Labor	Leeanne Enoch	15,463	45.81	−13.11
Liberal National	Jitendra Prasad	10,871	32.21	+6.87
Greens	Andrea Wildin	3,219	9.54	+1.05
One Nation	George Maris	1,603	4.75	−2.5
Independent	Rhys Bosley	1,560	4.62	+4.62
Family First	Jane Turner	1,035	3.07	+3.07
Total formal votes		33,751	95.38	−0.39
Informal votes		1,636	4.62	0.39
Turnout		35,387	87.94	+0.32
Two-party-preferred result
Labor	Leeanne Enoch	19,398	57.47	−10.3
Liberal National	Jitendra Prasad	14,353	42.53	+10.3
Labor hold		Swing	–10.3	

=== Aspley ===
2024 Queensland state election: Aspley
Party	Candidate	Votes	%	±%
Liberal National	Amanda Cooper	15,696	43.91	+3.41
Labor	Bart Mellish	13,988	39.13	−6.38
Greens	Fiona Hawkins	3,817	10.68	+1.74
One Nation	Allan Hall	1,539	4.30	+0.90
Family First	Wayne Capell	707	1.98	+1.98
Total formal votes		35,747	96.96	−0.96
Informal votes		1,119	3.04	+0.96
Turnout		36,866	92.17	+1.57
Two-party-preferred result
Labor	Bart Mellish	17,889	50.04	−5.12
Liberal National	Amanda Cooper	17,858	49.96	+5.12
Labor hold		Swing	–5.12	

=== Bancroft ===
2024 Queensland state election: Bancroft
Party	Candidate	Votes	%	±%
Labor	Chris Whiting	16,141	46.86	−6.74
Liberal National	Rob Barridge	12,150	35.28	+6.92
One Nation	Matthew Langfield	2,605	7.57	−1.20
Greens	Gabrielle Unverzagt	2,499	7.26	+1.28
Independent	Barry Grant	1,046	3.04	−0.25
Total formal votes		34,441	96.24	−0.26
Informal votes		1,345	3.76	+0.26
Turnout		35,786	87.91	+1.71
Two-party-preferred result
Labor	Chris Whiting	19,289	56.01	−6.79
Liberal National	Rob Barridge	15,152	43.99	+6.79
Labor hold		Swing	–6.79	

=== Barron River ===
2024 Queensland state election: Barron River
Party	Candidate	Votes	%	±%
Liberal National	Bree James	13,612	39.72	+1.12
Labor	Craig Crawford	11,208	32.71	−6.79
Greens	Denise Crew	3,564	10.40	−2.70
One Nation	Peter Eicens	3,032	8.85	+2.95
Katter's Australian	Ben Campbell	2,851	8.32	+8.32
Total formal votes		34,267	95.95	−0.79
Informal votes		1,448	4.05	+0.79
Turnout		35,715	86.23	−0.30
Two-party-preferred result
Liberal National	Bree James	18,403	53.70	+6.76
Labor	Craig Crawford	15,864	46.30	−6.76
Liberal National gain from Labor		Swing	+6.76	

=== Bonney ===
2024 Queensland state election: Bonney
Party	Candidate	Votes	%	±%
Liberal National	Sam O'Connor	16,560	54.32	+1.06
Labor	Kyle Kelly-Collins	7,988	26.20	−5.87
Greens	Amin Javanmard	2,880	9.45	+1.75
One Nation	Scott Philip	2,305	7.56	+3.69
Family First	Maria Theresia Rossouw	752	2.47	+2.47
Total formal votes		30,485	95.26	−0.97
Informal votes		795	4.5	+0.97
Turnout		32,002	84.30	
Two-party-preferred result
Liberal National	Sam O'Connor	19,409	63.67	+3.60
Labor	Kyle Kelly-Collins	11,076	36.33	−3.60
Liberal National hold		Swing	+3.60	

=== Broadwater ===
2024 Queensland state election: Broadwater
Party	Candidate	Votes	%	±%
Liberal National	David Crisafulli	20,916	63.99	+4.40
Labor	Tamika Hicks	7,022	21.48	−5.05
One Nation	Steven Whitehead	2,244	6.87	+0.94
Greens	Simon Margan	1,615	4.94	−0.28
Family First	Peter Edwards	889	2.72	+2.72
Total formal votes		32,686	96.70	−0.09
Informal votes		1,114	3.30	+0.09
Turnout		33,800	88.42	−0.73
Two-party-preferred result
Liberal National	David Crisafulli	23,311	71.32	+4.75
Labor	Tamika Hicks	9,375	28.68	−4.75
Liberal National hold		Swing	+4.75	

=== Buderim ===
2024 Queensland state election: Buderim
Party	Candidate	Votes	%	±%
Liberal National	Brent Mickelberg	17,670	48.87	+6.37
Labor	Adrian Burke	9,778	27.04	−1.26
Greens	Deborah Moseley	4,190	11.59	+0.79
One Nation	Ryan Beall	2,493	6.89	+2.19
Legalise Cannabis	Shaun Sandow	2,027	5.61	+5.61
Total formal votes		36,158	96.60	−0.83
Informal votes		1,271	3.40	+0.83
Turnout		37,429	89.20	+0.07
Two-party-preferred result
Liberal National	Brent Mickelberg	21,436	59.28	+3.99
Labor	Adrian Burke	14,722	40.72	−3.99
Liberal National hold		Swing	+3.99	

=== Bulimba ===
2024 Queensland state election: Bulimba
Party	Candidate	Votes	%	±%
Labor	Di Farmer	15,560	42.11	−6.12
Liberal National	Laura Wong	13,469	36.45	+2.26
Greens	Linda Barry	6,095	16.50	+3.08
One Nation	Jonathon Andrade	1126	3.05	+0.79
Independent	Matthew Bellina	698	1.89	+1.89
Total formal votes		36,948	97.68	−0.42
Informal votes		876	2.32	+0.42
Turnout		37,824	90.21	+0.68
Two-party-preferred result
Labor	Di Farmer	21,486	58.15	−3.24
Liberal National	Laura Wong	15,462	41.85	+3.24
Labor hold		Swing	–3.24	

=== Bundaberg ===
2024 Queensland state election: Bundaberg
Party	Candidate	Votes	%	±%
Labor	Tom Smith	13,253	41.47	−1.73
Liberal National	Bree Watson	12,262	38.37	−3.17
One Nation	Alberto Carvalho	2,451	7.67	+1.87
Legalise Cannabis	Ian Zunker	1,857	5.81	+0.31
Greens	Nat Baker	1,089	3.41	+0.21
Independent	Geoff Warham	603	1.89	+1.89
Independent	Alan Corbett	442	1.38	+1.38
Total formal votes		31,957	95.02	−1.46
Informal votes		1,676	4.98	+1.46
Turnout		33,633	88.57	−0.33
Two-party-preferred result
Labor	Tom Smith	16,460	51.51	+1.51
Liberal National	Bree Watson	15,497	48.49	−1.51
Labor hold		Swing	+1.51	

=== Bundamba ===
2024 Queensland state election: Bundamba
Party	Candidate	Votes	%	±%
Labor	Lance McCallum	15,326	43.66	−12.24
Liberal National	Carl Mutzelberg	8,872	25.27	+10.27
Greens	Tracey Nayler	3,743	10.66	+0.36
One Nation	Kelvin Brown	3,011	8.58	−6.32
Legalise Cannabis	Clive Brazier	1,612	4.59	+4.59
Family First	Jeremy Williams	1,150	3.28	+3.28
Animal Justice	Angela Lowery	808	2.30	−1.30
Independent Progressives	Edward Carroll	582	1.66	+1.66
Total formal votes		35,104	93.86	−1.91
Informal votes		2,296	6.14	+1.91
Turnout		37,400	82.25	−1.29
Two-party-preferred result
Labor	Lance McCallum	22,396	63.80	−7.40
Liberal National	Carl Mutzelberg	12,708	36.20	+7.40
Labor hold		Swing	–7.40	

=== Burdekin ===
2024 Queensland state election: Burdekin
Party	Candidate	Votes	%	±%
Liberal National	Dale Last	16,035	52.00	+12.30
Labor	Anne Baker	8,102	26.27	−5.43
Katter's Australian	Daniel Carroll	2,630	8.53	−5.67
One Nation	Andrew Elborne	2,342	7.59	+0.59
Family First	Amanda Nickson	922	2.99	+2.99
Greens	Ben Watkin	808	2.62	+0.62
Total formal votes		30,839	96.67	−0.04
Informal votes		1,061	3.33	+0.04
Turnout		31,900	87.55	−0.41
Two-party-preferred result
Liberal National	Dale Last	20,293	65.80	+8.75
Labor	Anne Baker	10,546	34.20	−8.75
Liberal National hold		Swing	+8.75	

=== Burleigh ===
2024 Queensland state election: Burleigh
Party	Candidate	Votes	%	±%
Liberal National	Hermann Vorster	15,002	49.81	+10.10
Labor	Claire Carlin	7,370	24.47	−11.40
Greens	Hunter Grove-McGrath	2,511	8.34	−0.97
Libertarian	Cathy Osborne	1,616	5.36	+5.36
One Nation	Eliot Tasses	1,315	4.36	−2.79
Legalise Cannabis	Jason Gann	996	3.31	−0.36
Animal Justice	Amelia Dunn	878	2.91	−0.30
Family First	Neena Tester	433	1.44	+1.44
Total formal votes		30,121	93.99	−1.81
Informal votes		1,926	6.01	+1.81
Turnout		32,047	84.31	−1.19
Two-party-preferred result
Liberal National	Hermann Vorster	18,902	62.75	+11.54
Labor	Claire Carlin	11,219	37.25	−11.54
Liberal National hold		Swing	+11.54	

=== Burnett ===
2024 Queensland state election: Burnett
Party	Candidate	Votes	%	±%
Liberal National	Stephen Bennett	18,247	50.07	+1.46
Labor	Kerri Morgan	9,202	25.25	−5.46
One Nation	Arno Blank	4,716	12.94	+3.96
Legalise Cannabis	Malcolm Parry	1,778	4.88	+4.88
Greens	Esther Vale	1,375	3.77	−0.78
Independent	Paul Hudson	1,128	3.09	−1.15 (Note: Compared to results as a Katter's Australian Party candidate at the 2020 election.)
Total formal votes		36,446	95.70	−0.31
Informal votes		1,639	4.30	+0.31
Turnout		38,085	90.62	−0.81
Two-party-preferred result
Liberal National	Stephen Bennett	23,843	65.42	+4.63
Labor	Kerri Morgan	12,603	34.58	−4.63
Liberal National hold		Swing	+4.63	

=== Cairns ===
2024 Queensland state election: Cairns
Party	Candidate	Votes	%	±%
Labor	Michael Healy	10,900	36.07	−8.13
Liberal National	Yolonde Entsch	9,796	32.41	−4.07
One Nation	Geena Court	5,099	16.87	+10.94
Greens	Josh Holt	3,390	11.22	+1.40
Independent	Shane Cuthbert	1,037	3.43	+3.43
Total formal votes		30,222	95.97	−0.49
Informal votes		1,268	4.03	+0.49
Turnout		31,490	79.74	−1.40
Two-party-preferred result
Labor	Michael Healy	15,860	52.48	−3.11
Liberal National	Yolonde Entsch	14,362	47.52	+3.11
Labor hold		Swing	−3.11	

=== Callide ===
2024 Queensland state election: Callide
Party	Candidate	Votes	%	±%
Liberal National	Bryson Head	17,917	56.88	−0.32
Labor	Samantha Dendle	5,611	17.81	−7.90
One Nation	Chris O'Callaghan	4,978	15.80	+15.80
Greens	Matthew Passant	1,279	4.06	+0.11
Family First	John Whittle	912	2.90	+2.90
Independent	Duncan Scott	804	2.55	+2.55
Total formal votes		31,501	96.49	−0.55
Informal votes		1,147	3.51	+0.55
Turnout		32,648	89.49	+1.25
Two-party-preferred result
Liberal National	Bryson Head	23,053	73.18	+7.35
Labor	Samantha Dendle	8,448	26.82	−7.35
Liberal National hold		Swing	+7.35	

=== Caloundra ===
2024 Queensland state election: Caloundra
Party	Candidate	Votes	%	±%
Liberal National	Kendall Morton	16,771	43.10	+5.40
Labor	Jason Hunt	13,986	35.95	−5.36
Greens	Peta Higgs	3,237	8.32	−1.79
One Nation	Ben Storch	2,388	6.14	−0.05
Legalise Cannabis	Allison McMaster	1,406	3.61	+3.61
Animal Justice	Pamela Mariko	633	1.63	+1.63
Independent	Mike Jessop	486	1.25	+0.49
Total formal votes		38,907	95.10	−0.49
Informal votes		2,004	4.90	+0.49
Turnout		40,911	89.43	+1.27
Two-party-preferred result
Liberal National	Kendall Morton	20,159	51.81	+4.32
Labor	Jason Hunt	18,748	48.19	−4.32
Liberal National gain from Labor		Swing	+4.32	

=== Capalaba ===
2024 Queensland state election: Capalaba
Party	Candidate	Votes	%	±%
Liberal National	Russell Field	14,665	44.39	+13.48
Labor	Don Brown	12,132	36.73	−11.48
Greens	Donna Weston	3,869	11.71	+3.76
One Nation	David Schmid	2,368	7.17	+1.98
Total formal votes		33,034	96.75	+0.56
Informal votes		1,109	3.25	−0.56
Turnout		34,143	90.82	+0.45
Two-party-preferred result
Liberal National	Russell Field	17,159	51.94	+11.75
Labor	Don Brown	15,875	48.06	−11.75
Liberal National gain from Labor		Swing	+11.75	

=== Chatsworth ===
2024 Queensland state election: Chatsworth
Party	Candidate	Votes	%	±%
Liberal National	Steve Minnikin	17,309	52.54	+6.25
Labor	Lisa O'Donnell	10,331	31.36	−8.23
Greens	James Smart	3,479	10.56	+1.24
One Nation	Jasmine Harte	1,031	3.13	+0.07
Family First	Eliza Campbell	796	2.41	+2.41
Total formal votes		32,946	97.39	−0.14
Informal votes		884	2.61	+0.14
Turnout		33,830	91.85	+1.10
Two-party-preferred result
Liberal National	Steve Minnikin	19,264	58.47	+7.18
Labor	Lisa O'Donnell	13,682	41.53	−7.18
Liberal National hold		Swing	+7.18	

=== Clayfield ===
2024 Queensland state election: Clayfield
Party	Candidate	Votes	%	±%
Liberal National	Tim Nicholls	17,591	47.37	+1.48
Labor	Belle Brookfield	10,905	29.37	−2.67
Greens	Jaimyn Mayer	6,490	17.48	−0.13
One Nation	Michelle Wilde	1,202	3.24	+0.89
Libertarian	Nick Buick	943	2.54	+2.54
Total formal votes		37,131	98.00	+0.02
Informal votes		758	2.00	−0.02
Turnout		37,889	89.36	+1.00
Two-party-preferred result
Liberal National	Tim Nicholls	19,881	53.54	+1.99
Labor	Belle Brookfield	17,250	46.46	−1.99
Liberal National hold		Swing	+1.99	

=== Condamine ===
2024 Queensland state election: Condamine
Party	Candidate	Votes	%	±%
Liberal National	Pat Weir	22,562	60.12	+5.46
Labor	Ben Whibley-Faulkner	6,685	17.81	−5.21
One Nation	Clay Harland	4,122	10.98	−4.67
Family First	Alan Hughes	2,086	5.56	+5.56
Greens	Ellisa Parker	2,074	5.53	+0.62
Total formal votes		37,529	96.62	−0.52
Informal votes		1,312	3.38	+0.52
Turnout		38,841	91.92	+0.13
Two-party-preferred result
Liberal National	Pat Weir	27,620	73.60	+4.40
Labor	Ben Whibley-Faulkner	9,909	26.40	−4.40
Liberal National hold		Swing	+4.40	

=== Cook ===
2024 Queensland state election: Cook
Party	Candidate	Votes	%	±%
Labor	Cynthia Lui	8,744	33.34	−6.68
Liberal National	David Kempton	8,728	33.28	+9.18
Katter's Australian	Duane Amos	5,158	19.67	+2.45
One Nation	Peter Campion	1,832	6.98	+0.35
Greens	Troy Miller	1,765	6.73	+1.69
Total formal votes		26,227	95.72	+0.03
Informal votes		1,172	4.28	−0.03
Turnout		27,399	74.88	−4.91
Two-party-preferred result
Liberal National	David Kempton	14,419	54.98	+11.24
Labor	Cynthia Lui	11,808	45.02	−11.24
Liberal National gain from Labor		Swing	+11.24	

=== Coomera ===
2024 Queensland state election: Coomera
Party	Candidate	Votes	%	±%
Liberal National	Michael Crandon	19,108	44.35	+4.38
Labor	Chris Johnson	11,897	27.61	−8.69
One Nation	Nick Muir	4,575	10.62	+2.30
Greens	Stuart Fletcher	2,847	6.61	−1.61
Legalise Cannabis	Suzette Luyken	2,667	6.19	+6.19
Family First	Nathan O'Brien	1,993	4.62	+4.62
Total formal votes		43,087	95.16	+0.06
Informal votes		2,193	4.84	−0.06
Turnout		45,280	84.03	−0.30
Two-party-preferred result
Liberal National	Michael Crandon	25,866	60.03	+8.95
Labor	Chris Johnson	17,221	39.97	−8.95
Liberal National hold		Swing	+8.95	

=== Cooper ===
2024 Queensland state election: Cooper
Party	Candidate	Votes	%	±%
Labor	Jonty Bush	12,941	37.17	+3.07
Liberal National	Raewyn Bailey	11,889	34.15	+0.71
Greens	Katinka Winston-Allom	8,878	25.50	−4.13
One Nation	Susan Ventnor	746	2.14	+0.40
Family First	Donna Gallehawk	361	1.04	+1.04
Total formal votes		34,815	98.23	−0.47
Informal votes		627	1.77	+0.47
Turnout		35,442	91.74	+0.29
Two-party-preferred result
Labor	Jonty Bush	21,296	61.17	+0.68
Liberal National	Raewyn Bailey	13,519	38.83	−0.68
Labor hold		Swing	+0.68	

=== Currumbin ===
2024 Queensland state election: Currumbin
Party	Candidate	Votes	%	±%
Liberal National	Laura Gerber	14,328	47.86	+7.62
Labor	Nathan Fleury	7,164	23.93	−10.79
Independent	Kath Down	2,939	9.82	+9.82
Greens	Braden Smith	2,854	9.53	−0.34
One Nation	Angela Gunson	1,598	5.34	+1.33
Animal Justice	Jennifer Horsburgh	696	2.32	+2.32
Family First	David Totenhofer	359	1.20	+1.20
Total formal votes		29,938	94.03	−1.31
Informal votes		1,902	5.97	+1.31
Turnout		31,840	84.38	−2.06
Two-party-preferred result
Liberal National	Laura Gerber	18,657	62.32	+11.80
Labor	Nathan Fleury	11,281	37.68	−11.80
Liberal National hold		Swing	+11.80	

=== Everton ===
2024 Queensland state election: Everton
Party	Candidate	Votes	%	±%
Liberal National	Tim Mander	17,710	49.43	+3.64
Labor	Michelle Byard	12,106	33.79	−4.00
Greens	Brent McDowall	4,370	12.20	+3.02
One Nation	Alan Buchbach	1,643	4.58	+1.47
Total formal votes		35,829	97.26	−0.48
Informal votes		1,010	2.74	+0.48
Turnout		36,839	92.70	+0.66
Two-party-preferred result
Liberal National	Tim Mander	19,801	55.27	+3.03
Labor	Michelle Byard	16,028	44.73	−3.03
Liberal National hold		Swing	+3.03	

=== Ferny Grove ===
2024 Queensland state election: Ferny Grove
Party	Candidate	Votes	%	±%
Labor	Mark Furner	13,631	39.78	−5.32
Liberal National	Nelson Savanh	12,290	35.87	+2.73
Greens	Elizabeth McAulay	6,679	19.49	+4.30
One Nation	Leonie Swanner	1,664	4.86	+1.90
Total formal votes		34,264	97.64	+0.26
Informal votes		828	2.36	−0.26
Turnout		35,092	92.31	+0.67
Two-party-preferred result
Labor	Mark Furner	19,834	57.89	−3.08
Liberal National	Nelson Savanh	14,430	42.11	+3.08
Labor hold		Swing	−3.08	

=== Gaven ===
2024 Queensland state election: Gaven
Party	Candidate	Votes	%	±%
Labor	Meaghan Scanlon	12,057	41.34	−6.06
Liberal National	Bianca Stone	11,343	38.89	+5.79
One Nation	Sandy Roach	2,440	8.37	+0.07
Greens	Sally Spain	1,515	5.19	−0.31
Legalise Cannabis	Jenelle Porter	1,240	4.25	+0.35
Family First	Ian Reid	573	1.96	+1.96
Total formal votes		29,168	95.45	+0.40
Informal votes		1,389	4.55	−0.40
Turnout		30,557	87.33	+0.61
Two-party-preferred result
Labor	Meaghan Scanlon	14,780	50.67	−7.13
Liberal National	Bianca Stone	14,388	49.33	+7.13
Labor hold		Swing	−7.13	

=== Gladstone ===
2024 Queensland state election: Gladstone
Party	Candidate	Votes	%	±%
Labor	Glenn Butcher	14,067	44.89	−19.61
Liberal National	Steve Askew	8,076	25.77	+10.57
One Nation	Andrew Jackson	4,497	14.35	+1.55
Greens	Beau Pett	1,722	5.50	+2.00
Legalise Cannabis	Brianna Corcoran	1,403	4.48	+4.48
Independent	Murray Peterson	901	2.88	−1.12
Family First	Christopher Herring	668	2.13	+2.13
Total formal votes		31,334	95.70	−1.17
Informal votes		1,407	4.30	+1.17
Turnout		32,741	88.17	+0.22
Two-party-preferred result
Labor	Glenn Butcher	18,554	59.21	−14.29
Liberal National	Steve Askew	12,780	40.79	+14.29
Labor hold		Swing	−14.29	

=== Glass House ===
2024 Queensland state election: Glass House
Party	Candidate	Votes	%	±%
Liberal National	Andrew Powell	15,149	45.42	+5.12
Labor	Humphrey Caspersz	7,969	23.89	−8.21
Greens	Andrew McLean	4,009	12.02	−0.88
One Nation	Adam Farr	3,668	11.00	+0.70
Legalise Cannabis	Timothy Hallcroft	1,696	5.08	+5.08
Family First	Bronwen Bolitho	865	2.59	+2.59
Total formal votes		33,356	95.66	−0.91
Informal votes		1,515	4.34	+0.91
Turnout		34,871	89.77	−0.97
Two-party-preferred result
Liberal National	Andrew Powell	20,074	60.18	+8.58
Labor	Humphrey Caspersz	13,282	39.82	−8.58
Liberal National hold		Swing	+8.58	

=== Greenslopes ===
2024 Queensland state election: Greenslopes
Party	Candidate	Votes	%	±%
Labor	Joe Kelly	12,205	35.55	−5.75
Liberal National	Andrew Newbold	11,711	34.11	+2.61
Greens	Rebecca White	9,049	26.35	+2.85
One Nation	Hugh Dickson	932	2.71	+0.21
Family First	Karine Davis	438	1.28	+1.28
Total formal votes		34,335	97.81	−0.26
Informal votes		767	2.19	+0.26
Turnout		35,120	90.60	+1.97
Two-party-preferred result
Labor	Joe Kelly	20,534	59.80	−3.40
Liberal National	Andrew Newbold	13,801	40.20	+3.40
Labor hold		Swing	−3.40	

=== Gregory ===
2024 Queensland state election: Gregory
Party	Candidate	Votes	%	±%
Liberal National	Sean Dillon	12,249	57.38	+3.18
Labor	Rebecca Humphreys	4,486	21.01	−3.79
One Nation	Michael Ellison	2,977	13.94	+0.14
Family First	John Campbell	993	4.65	+4.65
Greens	Ell-Leigh Ackerman	644	3.02	+0.22
Total formal votes		21,349	96.85	−0.43
Informal votes		694	3.15	+0.43
Turnout		22,043	83.90	−1.84
Two-party-preferred result
Liberal National	Sean Dillon	15,167	71.04	+3.84
Labor	Rebecca Humphreys	6,182	28.96	−3.84
Liberal National hold		Swing	+3.84	

=== Gympie ===
2024 Queensland state election: Gympie
Party	Candidate	Votes	%	±%
Liberal National	Tony Perrett	17,530	46.43	+4.01
Labor	Lachlan Anderson	8,849	23.44	−5.20
One Nation	Katy McCallum	8,347	22.11	+9.53
Greens	Emma Buhse	3,029	8.02	+1.81
Total formal votes		37,755	95.79	+0.60
Informal votes		1,661	4.21	−0.60
Turnout		39,416	89.06	+0.03
Two-party-preferred result
Liberal National	Tony Perrett	24,448	64.75	+6.26
Labor	Lachlan Anderson	13,307	35.25	−6.26
Liberal National hold		Swing	+6.26	

=== Hervey Bay ===
2024 Queensland state election: Hervey Bay
Party	Candidate	Votes	%	±%
Liberal National	David Lee	16,719	43.77	+9.42
Labor	Adrian Tantari	12,331	32.28	−7.22
One Nation	Quinn Hendry	4,916	12.87	+1.73
Legalise Cannabis	Jeff Knipe	2,679	7.01	+7.01
Greens	Pat Walsh	1,553	4.07	+0.94
Total formal votes		38,198	96.34	−0.11
Informal votes		1,450	3.66	+0.11
Turnout		39,648	88.57	−0.07
Two-party-preferred result
Liberal National	David Lee	22,306	58.40	+10.42
Labor	Adrian Tantari	15,892	41.60	−10.42
Liberal National gain from Labor		Swing	+10.42	

=== Hill ===
2024 Queensland state election: Hill
Party	Candidate	Votes	%	±%
Katter's Australian	Shane Knuth	15,075	43.61	−9.01
Liberal National	Cameron McCollum	8,734	25.27	+8.32
Labor	Michael Hodgkin	5,250	15.19	−4.51
One Nation	Brenda Turner	2,375	6.87	+6.87
Greens	Jennifer Cox	2,329	6.74	+0.28
Independent	Matt Lachlan	802	2.32	+2.32
Total formal votes		34,565	96.24	−0.23
Informal votes		1,351	3.76	+0.23
Turnout		35,916	86.12	−1.88
Two-candidate-preferred result
Katter's Australian	Shane Knuth	22,029	63.73	−8.68
Liberal National	Cameron McCollum	12,536	36.27	+8.68
Katter's Australian hold		Swing	−8.68	

=== Hinchinbrook ===
2024 Queensland state election: Hinchinbrook
Party	Candidate	Votes	%	±%
Katter's Australian	Nick Dametto	15,351	46.42	+3.88
Liberal National	Annette Swaine	9,331	28.22	+3.28
Labor	Ina Pryor	4,639	14.03	−5.41
One Nation	Ric Daubert	1,523	4.60	−2.52
Legalise Cannabis	Kevin Wheatley	1,181	3.57	+3.57
Greens	Jon Kowski	1,044	3.16	−0.27
Total formal votes		33,069	96.57	+0.02
Informal votes		1,175	3.43	−0.02
Turnout		34,244	87.96	+0.97
Two-candidate-preferred result
Katter's Australian	Nick Dametto	20,889	63.17	−1.59
Liberal National	Annette Swaine	12,180	36.83	+1.59
Katter's Australian hold		Swing	−1.59	

=== Inala ===
2024 Queensland state election: Inala
Party	Candidate	Votes	%	±%
Labor	Margie Nightingale	15,227	47.13	−20.29
Liberal National	Trang Yen	9,104	28.18	+11.64
Greens	Linh Nguyen	3,925	12.15	+4.44
Independent	Kieu Oanh Do	1,495	4.63	+4.63
One Nation	Carl Cassin	1,386	4.29	−0.26
Animal Justice	Van Tuan Andy Nguyen	1,168	3.62	+3.62
Total formal votes		32,305	95.19	+0.09
Informal votes		1,632	4.81	−0.09
Turnout		33,937	86.80	−0.05
Two-party-preferred result
Labor	Margie Nightingale	20,235	62.64	−15.53
Liberal National	Trang Yen	12,070	37.36	+15.53
Labor hold		Swing	−15.53	

=== Ipswich ===
2024 Queensland state election: Ipswich
Party	Candidate	Votes	%	±%
Labor	Jennifer Howard	14,069	42.64	−9.16
Liberal National	Damian Culpeper	9,604	29.10	+8.77
Greens	Amanda Holly	3,527	10.69	+2.25
One Nation	Mathew Riesenweber	2,427	7.36	−6.55
Legalise Cannabis	Deborah Forrester	1,734	5.25	−0.27
Family First	Karen Fuller	1,637	4.96	+4.96
Total formal votes		32,998	95.56	−1.36
Informal votes		1,533	4.44	+1.36
Turnout		35,916	87.45	+0.49
Two-party-preferred result
Labor	Jennifer Howard	19,435	58.90	−7.62
Liberal National	Damian Culpeper	13,563	41.10	+7.62
Labor hold		Swing	−7.62	

=== Ipswich West ===
2024 Queensland state election: Ipswich West
Party	Candidate	Votes	%	±%
Labor	Wendy Bourne	12,660	38.63	−11.52
Liberal National	Georgia Toft	10,979	33.50	+12.39
One Nation	Brad Trussell	2,968	9.06	−5.66
Greens	Mark Delaney	2,498	7.62	+1.09
Legalise Cannabis	Harmony Lindsay	1,711	5.22	+0.68
Family First	Beverley Byrnes	1,458	4.45	+4.45
Libertarian	Anthony Bull	497	1.52	+1.52
Total formal votes		32,771	94.89	−1.10
Informal votes		1,763	5.11	+1.10
Turnout		34,534	87.44	+0.68
Two-party-preferred result
Labor	Wendy Bourne	17,672	53.93	−10.42
Liberal National	Georgia Toft	15,099	46.07	+10.42
Labor gain from Liberal National		Swing	−10.42	

=== Jordan ===
2024 Queensland state election: Jordan
Party	Candidate	Votes	%	±%
Labor	Charis Mullen	19,225	48.57	−6.87
Liberal National	Kevin Burns	12,300	31.08	+8.39
Greens	Dung Tran	4,106	10.37	−0.37
One Nation	Sabeh Abou Chahla	2,866	7.24	−3.88
Libertarian	Michael Pucci	1,085	2.74	+2.74
Total formal votes		39,582	95.55	−0.98
Informal votes		1,842	4.45	+0.98
Turnout		41,424	88.98	+0.58
Two-party-preferred result
Labor	Charis Mullen	23,729	59.95	−7.15
Liberal National	Kevin Burns	15,853	40.05	+7.15
Labor hold		Swing	−7.15	

=== Kawana ===
2024 Queensland state election: Kawana
Party	Candidate	Votes	%	±%
Liberal National	Jarrod Bleijie	19,036	55.56	+4.72
Labor	Jim Dawson	9,717	28.36	−2.60
Greens	Ian Simons	3,263	9.52	+0.19
One Nation	Peter Hinton	2,247	6.56	+0.50
Total formal votes		34,263	96.54	−0.30
Informal votes		1,229	3.46	+0.30
Turnout		35,492	88.62	−0.59
Two-party-preferred result
Liberal National	Jarrod Bleijie	21,489	62.72	+3.41
Labor	Jim Dawson	12,774	37.28	−3.41
Liberal National hold		Swing	+3.41	

=== Keppel ===
2024 Queensland state election: Keppel
Party	Candidate	Votes	%	±%
Liberal National	Nigel Hutton	12,684	36.09	+6.52
Labor	Brittany Lauga	10,376	29.52	−16.70
One Nation	James Ashby	8,807	25.06	+9.41
Greens	Clancy Mullbrick	1,668	4.75	+0.76
Independent	Petrina Murphy	806	2.29	+2.29
Family First	Roger McWhinney	804	2.29	+2.29
Total formal votes		35,145	96.44	−0.64
Informal votes		1,296	3.56	+0.64
Turnout		36,441	90.21	+0.17
Two-party-preferred result
Liberal National	Nigel Hutton	21,254	60.48	+16.11
Labor	Brittany Lauga	13,891	39.52	−16.11
Liberal National gain from Labor		Swing	+16.11	

=== Kurwongbah ===
2024 Queensland state election: Kurwongbah
Party	Candidate	Votes	%	±%
Labor	Shane King	15,596	43.36	−8.43
Liberal National	Tanya McKewen	12,123	33.70	+6.72
Greens	Jordan Martin	3,006	8.36	+0.97
One Nation	Christopher Leech	2,789	7.75	−1.29
Family First	William Ross Pitt	1,575	4.38	+4.38
Animal Justice	Gregory Dillon	883	2.45	−0.06
Total formal votes		35,972	96.39	+0.05
Informal votes		1,347	3.61	−0.05
Turnout		37,319	89.31	+0.59
Two-party-preferred result
Labor	Shane King	20,103	55.89	−7.26
Liberal National	Tanya McKewen	15,869	44.11	+7.26
Labor hold		Swing	−7.26	

=== Lockyer ===
2024 Queensland state election: Lockyer
Party	Candidate	Votes	%	±%
Liberal National	Jim McDonald	17,909	52.74	+7.64
Labor	Euan Tiernan	6,758	19.90	−4.80
One Nation	Corey West	5,351	15.76	+2.46
Greens	Paul Toner	2,120	6.24	+1.34
Family First	Julie Rose	1,822	5.36	+5.36
Total formal votes		33,960	96.14	−0.38
Informal votes		1,363	3.86	+0.38
Turnout		35,323	89.40	−0.33
Two-party-preferred result
Liberal National	Jim McDonald	23,488	69.16	+7.56
Labor	Euan Tiernan	10,472	30.84	−7.56
Liberal National hold		Swing	+7.56	

=== Logan ===
2024 Queensland state election: Logan
Party	Candidate	Votes	%	±%
Labor	Linus Power	15,965	40.66	−12.81
Liberal National	Mathew Owens	13,321	33.93	+9.03
One Nation	Aaron Abraham	3,975	10.13	−3.68
Greens	Joshua Riethmuller	2,543	6.48	+0.35
Legalise Cannabis	Jacqueline Verne	2,062	5.25	+5.25
Family First	Simon Taylor	1,395	3.55	+3.55
Total formal votes		39,261	94.38	−1.88
Informal votes		2,337	5.62	+1.88
Turnout		41,598	85.29	−0.20
Two-party-preferred result
Labor	Linus Power	21,304	54.26	−9.13
Liberal National	Mathew Owens	17,957	45.74	+9.13
Labor hold		Swing	−9.13	

=== Lytton ===
2024 Queensland state election: Lytton
Party	Candidate	Votes	%	±%
Labor	Joan Pease	14,003	40.19	−12.02
Liberal National	Chad Gardiner	13,146	37.73	+7.28
Greens	Jade Whitla	3,932	11.28	+0.73
One Nation	David White	1,926	5.53	+1.59
Independent	Craig Moore	1,158	3.32	+3.32
Family First	James (Jim) Vote	681	1.95	+1.95
Total formal votes		34,846	96.77	−0.68
Informal votes		1,164	3.23	+0.68
Turnout		36,010	90.85	+1.09
Two-party-preferred result
Labor	Joan Pease	18,470	53.00	−10.35
Liberal National	Chad Gardiner	16,376	47.00	+10.35
Labor hold		Swing	−10.35	

=== Macalister ===
2024 Queensland state election: Macalister
Party	Candidate	Votes	%	±%
Labor	Melissa McMahon	13,631	40.82	−3.36
Liberal National	Rob van Manen	12,041	36.06	+8.92
Greens	Liam Johns	2,369	7.09	+0.89
One Nation	Cheree Cooper	2,327	6.97	−0.49
Legalise Cannabis	Meredith Brisk	1,568	4.70	+4.70
Family First	Paul Davis	1,457	4.36	+4.36
Total formal votes		33,393	94.63	+0.03
Informal votes		1,895	5.37	−0.03
Turnout		35,288	84.19	+0.59
Two-party-preferred result
Labor	Melissa McMahon	17,342	51.93	−7.61
Liberal National	Rob van Manen	16,051	48.07	+7.61
Labor hold		Swing	−7.61	

=== Mackay ===
2024 Queensland state election: Mackay
Party	Candidate	Votes	%	±%
Liberal National	Nigel Dalton	15,155	45.99	+14.04
Labor	Belinda Hassan	9,985	30.30	−16.17
One Nation	Kylee Stanton	3,864	11.73	−0.86
Greens	Paula Creen	1,635	4.96	+1.56
Legalise Cannabis	Ben Gauci	1,625	4.93	+0.55
Family First	Norman Martin	689	2.09	+2.09
Total formal votes		32,953	95.50	−0.49
Informal votes		1,551	4.50	+0.49
Turnout		34,504	85.41	−0.46
Two-party-preferred result
Liberal National	Nigel Dalton	19,839	60.20	+16.92
Labor	Belinda Hassan	13,114	39.80	−16.92
Liberal National gain from Labor		Swing	+16.92	

=== Maiwar ===
2024 Queensland state election: Maiwar
Party	Candidate	Votes	%	±%
Liberal National	Natasha Winters	13,676	37.70	+0.50
Greens	Michael Berkman	12,319	33.96	−7.44
Labor	Susan Irvine	9,160	25.25	+6.75
One Nation	Grant Spork	1,119	3.09	+1.69
Total formal votes		36,274	98.22	−0.41
Informal votes		658	1.78	+0.41
Turnout		36,932	90.84	+0.39
Two-candidate-preferred result
Greens	Michael Berkman	19,382	53.43	−2.87
Liberal National	Natasha Winters	16,892	46.57	+2.87
Greens hold		Swing	−2.87	

=== Mansfield ===
2024 Queensland state election: Mansfield
Party	Candidate	Votes	%	±%
Labor	Corrine McMillan	13,674	42.60	−3.54
Liberal National	Pinky Singh	12,237	38.12	−0.31
Greens	Wen Li	3,776	11.76	+2.16
One Nation	Katrina Coleman	1,490	4.64	+2.33
Family First	Anthony Ross Dovey	924	2.88	+2.88
Total formal votes		32,101	96.93	−0.47
Informal votes		1,017	3.07	+0.47
Turnout		33,118	90.48	+0.01
Two-party-preferred result
Labor	Corrine McMillan	17,620	54.89	−1.91
Liberal National	Pinky Singh	14,481	45.11	+1.91
Labor hold		Swing	−1.91	

=== Maroochydore ===
2024 Queensland state election: Maroochydore
Party	Candidate	Votes	%	±%
Liberal National	Fiona Simpson	16,897	52.85	+4.97
Labor	Naomi McQueen	9,007	28.17	+2.49
Greens	Heinrich Koekemoer	3,214	10.05	−1.02
One Nation	Kyle Haley	2,040	6.38	+2.24
Independent	Mark Wadeson	815	2.55	+2.06
Total formal votes		31,973	96.22	+0.44
Informal votes		1,256	3.78	−0.44
Turnout		33,229	86.74	−0.60
Two-party-preferred result
Liberal National	Fiona Simpson	19,479	60.92	+1.80
Labor	Naomi McQueen	12,494	39.08	−1.80
Liberal National hold		Swing	+1.80	

=== Maryborough ===
2024 Queensland state election: Maryborough
Party	Candidate	Votes	%	±%
Labor	Bruce Saunders	14,336	38.63	−14.64
Liberal National	John Barounis	13,593	36.63	+10.33
One Nation	Taryn Gillard	5,702	15.37	+2.19
Greens	Lauren Granger-Brown	1,323	3.56	+0.90
Family First	Kerry Petrus	904	2.44	+2.44
Independent	Jamie Miller	811	2.19	+2.19
Independent	Daniel James Beattie	439	1.18	+1.18
Total formal votes		37,108	95.13	−1.13
Informal votes		1,899	4.87	+1.13
Turnout		39,007	90.46	+0.00
Two-party-preferred result
Liberal National	John Barounis	19,609	52.84	+14.73
Labor	Bruce Saunders	17,499	47.16	−14.73
Liberal National gain from Labor		Swing	+14.73	

=== McConnel ===
2024 Queensland state election: McConnel
Party	Candidate	Votes	%	±%
Labor	Grace Grace	12,354	35.48	+0.18
Liberal National	Christien Duffey	12,153	34.90	+3.93
Greens	Holstein Wong	8,791	25.24	−2.91
One Nation	Gavin Jones	1,141	3.28	+1.84
Family First	Kirsty Sands	382	1.10	+1.10
Total formal votes		34,821	97.36	−0.02
Informal votes		943	2.64	+0.02
Turnout		35,764	84.68	−0.99
Two-party-preferred result
Labor	Grace Grace	20,458	58.75	−2.31
Liberal National	Christien Duffey	14,363	41.25	+2.31
Labor hold		Swing	−2.31	

=== Mermaid Beach ===
2024 Queensland state election: Mermaid Beach
Party	Candidate	Votes	%	±%
Liberal National	Ray Stevens	15,762	51.48	+7.41
Labor	Joseph Shiels	8,002	26.14	−4.35
Greens	Lucy Carra Schulz	3,331	10.88	+0.08
One Nation	Roger Marquass	2,097	6.85	+1.84
Family First	Clare Todd	1,423	4.65	+4.65
Total formal votes		30,615	94.53	+0.67
Informal votes		1,771	5.47	−0.67
Turnout		32,386	84.64	−0.42
Two-party-preferred result
Liberal National	Ray Stevens	19,331	63.14	+8.75
Labor	Joseph Shiels	11,284	36.86	−8.75
Liberal National hold		Swing	+8.75	

=== Miller ===
2024 Queensland state election: Miller
Party	Candidate	Votes	%	±%
Labor	Mark Bailey	12,378	37.84	−4.15
Liberal National	Clio Padayachee	11,122	34.00	+3.43
Greens	Liam Flenady	7,706	23.56	+2.92
One Nation	Ashley Pettit	990	3.02	+1.10
Animal Justice	Carola Veloso-Busich	517	1.58	+1.58
Total formal votes		32,713	98.16	+0.06
Informal votes		612	1.84	−0.06
Turnout		33,325	91.51	+0.10
Two-party-preferred result
Labor	Mark Bailey	19,828	60.61	−3.21
Liberal National	Clio Padayachee	12,885	39.39	+3.21
Labor hold		Swing	−3.21	

=== Mirani ===
2024 Queensland state election: Mirani
Party	Candidate	Votes	%	±%
Liberal National	Glen Kelly	11,750	36.67	+9.08
Katter's Australian	Stephen Andrew	8,017	25.02	+25.02
Labor	Susan Teder	6,521	20.35	−11.62
One Nation	Brett Neal	3,804	11.87	−19.79
Greens	Maria Carty	1,043	3.25	+0.82
Family First	Patricia Martin	911	2.84	+2.84
Total formal votes		32,046	95.73	−0.52
Informal votes		1,429	4.27	+0.52
Turnout		33,475	89.89	+0.30
Two-candidate-preferred result
Liberal National	Glen Kelly	16,333	50.97	N/A
Katter's Australian	Stephen Andrew	15,713	49.03	N/A
Liberal National gain from Katter's Australian		Swing	N/A	

=== Moggill ===
2024 Queensland state election: Moggill
Party	Candidate	Votes	%	±%
Liberal National	Christian Rowan	16,003	48.51	+1.61
Labor	Eric Richman	8,655	26.24	−2.16
Greens	Andrew Kidd	6,768	20.52	−0.06
One Nation	Cheryl Wood	1,562	4.73	+1.83
Total formal votes		32,988	97.8	
Informal votes		727	2.2	
Turnout		33,715	91.20	
Two-party-preferred result
Liberal National	Christian Rowan	18,350	55.63	+2.03
Labor	Eric Richman	14,638	44.37	−2.03
Liberal National hold		Swing	+2.03	

=== Morayfield ===
2024 Queensland state election: Morayfield
Party	Candidate	Votes	%	±%
Labor	Mark Ryan	15,479	45.25	−9.15
Liberal National	Sarah Ross	9,786	28.61	+6.91
One Nation	Rodney Hansen	3,869	11.31	−0.59
Greens	Mark Jessup	2,338	6.83	−1.07
Legalise Cannabis	Frank Jordan	1,750	5.12	+5.12
Family First	Suniti Hewett	986	2.88	+2.88
Total formal votes		34,208	94.87	
Informal votes		1,850	5.13	
Turnout		36,058	85.15	
Two-party-preferred result
Labor	Mark Ryan	19,520	57.06	−9.74
Liberal National	Sarah Ross	14,688	42.94	+9.74
Labor hold		Swing	–9.74	

=== Mount Ommaney ===
2024 Queensland state election: Mount Ommaney
Party	Candidate	Votes	%	±%
Labor	Jess Pugh	15,005	45.46	−5.14
Liberal National	Lisa Baillie	12,544	38.00	+5.9
Greens	Chris Richardson	3,830	11.60	+0.60
One Nation	Thorold Cusack	1,137	3.45	+0.95
Animal Justice	Michelle Jensz	492	1.49	+1.49
Total formal votes		33,008	97.15	
Informal votes		970	2.85	
Turnout		33,978	92.10	
Two-party-preferred result
Labor	Jess Pugh	18,929	57.35	−5.25
Liberal National	Lisa Baillie	14,079	42.65	+5.25
Labor hold		Swing	-5.25	

=== Mudgeeraba ===
2024 Queensland state election: Mudgeeraba
Party	Candidate	Votes	%	±%
Liberal National	Ros Bates	17,842	51.69	+2.69
Labor	Sophie Lynch	8,711	25.23	−1.27
One Nation	Carl Mocnik	3,545	10.27	+2.57
Greens	Scott Turner	3,261	9.45	+0.55
Family First	Samuel Buckley	1,161	3.36	+3.36
Total formal votes		34,520	95.57	
Informal votes		1,601	4.43	
Turnout		36,121	87.79	
Two-party-preferred result
Liberal National	Ros Bates	22,053	63.88	+3.78
Labor	Sophie Lynch	12,467	36.12	−3.78
Liberal National hold		Swing	+3.78	

=== Mulgrave ===
2024 Queensland state election: Mulgrave
Party	Candidate	Votes	%	±%
Liberal National	Terry James	8,369	27.44	+1.74
Labor	Richie Bates	7,384	24.21	−25.59
Katter's Australian	Steven Lesina	4,934	16.18	+4.28
One Nation	Michael McInnes	2,654	8.70	+2.30
Independent	David Raymond	2,056	6.74	+6.74
Legalise Cannabis	Nicholas Daniels	1,804	5.92	+5.92
Greens	Peter Everett	1,289	4.23	−1.97
Independent	Yodie Batzke	1,044	3.42	+3.42
Family First	Leslie Searle	593	2.0	+2.0
Independent	Ian Floyd	370	1.21	+1.21
Total formal votes		30,497	93.51	
Informal votes		2,115	6.51	
Turnout		32,612	81.75	
Two-party-preferred result
Liberal National	Terry James	16,066	52.68	+14.88
Labor	Richie Bates	14,431	47.28	−14.88
Liberal National gain from Labor		Swing	+14.88	

=== Mundingburra ===
2024 Queensland state election: Mundingburra
Party	Candidate	Votes	%	±%
Liberal National	Janelle Poole	13,020	44.36	+11.96
Labor	Les Walker	8,864	30.20	−8.10
Katter's Australian	Michael Pugh	3,808	12.97	+0.87
Greens	Rebecca Haley	2,255	7.68	+0.78
One Nation	Mick Olsen	1,405	4.79	+0.19
Total formal votes		29,352	96.02	
Informal votes		1,089	3.58	
Turnout		30,441	86.63	
Two-party-preferred result
Liberal National	Janelle Poole	17,380	59.21	+13.11
Labor	Les Walker	11,972	40.79	−13.11
Liberal National gain from Labor		Swing	+13.11	

=== Murrumba ===
2024 Queensland state election: Murrumba
Party	Candidate	Votes	%	±%
Labor	Steven Miles	19,076	47.67	−2.87
Liberal National	Gary Fulton	12,310	30.76	+1.76
Greens	Deklan Green	2,534	6.33	−1.87
Legalise Cannabis	David Zaloudek	2,116	5.29	+5.29
One Nation	Duncan Geldenhuys	1,727	4.32	−3.18
Independent	Sarah Kropman	905	2.26	+2.26
Family First	David Todd	846	2.11	+2.11
Independent DLP	Scott Donovan	314	0.78	+0.78
Independent	Caleb Wells	191	0.48	+0.48
Total formal votes		40,019	96.25	
Informal votes		1,560	3.75	
Turnout		41,579	88.53	
Two-party-preferred result
Labor	Steven Miles	23,922	59.78	−1.62
Liberal National	Gary Fulton	16,097	40.22	+1.62
Labor hold		Swing	–1.62	

=== Nanango ===
2024 Queensland state election: Nanango
Party	Candidate	Votes	%	±%
Liberal National	Deb Frecklington	19,319	55.27	+5.37
Labor	Val Heward	6,071	17.37	−10.33
One Nation	Adam Maslen	4,210	12.05	−2.65
Independent	Jason Miles	1,892	5.41	−0.89
Legalise Cannabis	Anthony Hopkins	1,350	3.86	−0.34
Greens	Angus Ryan	1,120	3.21	−0.29
Family First	Benjamin Mitchell	693	1.98	+1.98
Independent	Nathan Hope	295	0.85	+0.85
Total formal votes		34,952	95.85	
Informal votes		1,514	4.15	
Turnout		36,466	88.77	
Two-party-preferred result
Liberal National	Deb Frecklington	25,488	72.92	+10.72
Labor	Val Heward	9,464	27.08	−10.72
Liberal National hold		Swing	+10.72	

=== Nicklin ===
2024 Queensland state election: Nicklin
Party	Candidate	Votes	%	±%
Liberal National	Marty Hunt	12,379	37.84	−0.06
Labor	Robert Skelton	9,745	29.79	−4.71
Greens	Sue Etheridge	3,292	10.06	−2.44
Legalise Cannabis	Melody Lindsay	2,506	7.66	+7.66
One Nation	Rebecca McCosker	2,401	7.34	+0.94
Family First	Phillip Eschler	1,519	4.64	+4.64
Independent	Steve Dickson	875	2.67	+2.67
Total formal votes		32,717	95.22	
Informal votes		1,644	4.78	
Turnout		34,361	87.70	
Two-party-preferred result
Liberal National	Marty Hunt	17,240	52.69	+2.79
Labor	Robert Skelton	15,477	47.31	−2.79
Liberal National gain from Labor		Swing	+2.79	

=== Ninderry ===
2024 Queensland state election: Ninderry
Party	Candidate	Votes	%	±%
Liberal National	Dan Purdie	17,950	48.43	+4.43
Labor	Jo Justo	9,774	26.37	−6.03
Greens	Tom Carden	3,738	10.08	−2.42
One Nation	Michael Stewart	3,243	8.75	+2.55
Legalise Cannabis	Timothy Nixon	2,362	6.37	+6.37
Total formal votes		37,067	96.34	
Informal votes		1,407	3.66	
Turnout		38,474	88.70	
Two-party-preferred result
Liberal National	Dan Purdie	22,411	60.46	+6.36
Labor	Jo Justo	14,656	39.54	−6.36
Liberal National hold		Swing	+6.36	

=== Noosa ===
2024 Queensland state election: Noosa
Party	Candidate	Votes	%	±%
Independent	Sandy Bolton	14,237	43.22	−0.68
Liberal National	Clare Stewart	11,843	35.96	+6.76
Labor	Mark Denham	3,066	9.31	−5.09
Greens	Rhonda Prescott	1,865	5.66	−1.54
One Nation	Darrel Hinson	1,550	4.71	+1.11
Family First	Felicity Roser	377	1.14	+1.14
Total formal votes		32,938	96.68	
Informal votes		1,131	3.32	
Turnout		34,069	88.34	
Two-candidate-preferred result
Independent	Sandy Bolton	19,283	58.54	−7.26
Liberal National	Clare Stewart	13,655	41.46	+7.26
Independent hold		Swing	−7.26	

=== Nudgee ===
2024 Queensland state election: Nudgee
Party	Candidate	Votes	%	±%
Labor	Leanne Linard	16,860	48.20	−3.30
Liberal National	Robert Wilson	11,137	31.84	+1.84
Greens	Jim Davies	4,721	13.50	+0.30
One Nation	Joshua Baer	1,248	3.57	+0.07
Family First	Sharan Hall	591	1.69	+1.69
Independent	Bruce Tanti	419	1.20	+1.20
Total formal votes		34,976	97.08	
Informal votes		1,053	2.92	
Turnout		36,029	89.80	
Two-party-preferred result
Labor	Leanne Linard	21,686	62.00	−3.10
Liberal National	Robert Wilson	13,290	38.00	+3.10
Labor hold		Swing	–3.10	

=== Oodgeroo ===
2024 Queensland state election: Oodgeroo
Party	Candidate	Votes	%	±%
Liberal National	Amanda Stoker	17,360	55.69	+14.79
Labor	Irene Henley	9,002	28.88	+0.98
Greens	Callen Sorensen Karklis	3,010	9.66	+4.36
One Nation	Justin Sheil	1,800	5.77	+2.47
Total formal votes		31,172	97.03	
Informal votes		954	2.97	
Turnout		32,126	91.67	
Two-party-preferred result
Liberal National	Amanda Stoker	19,257	61.78	+7.28
Labor	Irene Henley	11,915	38.22	−7.28
Liberal National hold		Swing	+7.28	

=== Pine Rivers ===
2024 Queensland state election: Pine Rivers
Party	Candidate	Votes	%	±%
Liberal National	Dean Clements	15,082	41.25	+4.85
Labor	Nikki Boyd	14,406	39.41	−5.09
Greens	Sonja Gerdsen	3,546	9.70	+0.30
One Nation	Matthew Robinson	2,472	6.76	+1.66
Animal Justice	Maureen Brohman	1,052	2.88	+1.28
Total formal votes		36,558	97.08	
Informal votes		1,098	2.92	
Turnout		37,656	91.48	
Two-party-preferred result
Labor	Nikki Boyd	18,533	50.69	−6.01
Liberal National	Dean Clements	18,025	49.31	+6.01
Labor hold		Swing	–6.01	

=== Pumicestone ===
2024 Queensland state election: Pumicestone
Party	Candidate	Votes	%	±%
Liberal National	Ariana Doolan	15,230	41.18	+4.78
Labor	Ali King	14,985	40.51	−5.59
One Nation	Samuel Beaton	2,868	7.75	−0.15
Legalise Cannabis	Rosie Doolan	1,647	4.45	+0.25
Greens	Richard Ogden	1,560	4.22	−0.08
Family First	Laine Harth	698	1.89	+1.89
Total formal votes		36,988	96.14	
Informal votes		1,486	3.9	
Turnout		38,474	89.55	
Two-party-preferred result
Liberal National	Ariana Doolan	18,640	50.39	+5.69
Labor	Ali King	18,348	49.61	−5.69
Liberal National gain from Labor		Swing	+5.69	

=== Redcliffe ===
2024 Queensland state election: Redcliffe
Party	Candidate	Votes	%	±%
Liberal National	Kerri-Anne Dooley	15,851	44.43	+7.13
Labor	Kass Hall	12,805	35.89	−11.01
Greens	Will Simon	3,257	9.13	+1.93
One Nation	Simon Salloum	2,654	7.44	+3.04
Independent	Gerard Saunders	1,110	3.11	+3.11
Total formal votes		35,677	95.94	
Informal votes		1,508	4.06	
Turnout		37,185	88.60	
Two-party-preferred result
Liberal National	Kerri-Anne Dooley	18,879	52.92	+9.02
Labor	Kass Hall	16,798	47.08	−9.02
Liberal National gain from Labor		Swing	+9.02	

=== Redlands ===
2024 Queensland state election: Redlands
Party	Candidate	Votes	%	±%
Liberal National	Rebecca Young	15,537	42.43	+4.33
Labor	Kim Richards	13,848	37.81	−5.69
Greens	Kristie Lockhart	2,495	6.81	−0.39
One Nation	Gary Williamson	2,036	5.56	+1.36
Legalise Cannabis	Suzanne Spierenburg	1,537	4.20	+0.70
Family First	Marita Neville	667	1.82	+1.82
Animal Justice	Liela D'Rose	503	1.37	+1.37
Total formal votes		36,623	95.87	
Informal votes		1,576	4.13	
Turnout		38,199	90.05	
Two-party-preferred result
Liberal National	Rebecca Young	19,005	51.89	+5.79
Labor	Kim Richards	17,618	48.11	−5.79
Liberal National gain from Labor		Swing	+5.79	

=== Rockhampton ===
2024 Queensland state election: Rockhampton
Party	Candidate	Votes	%	±%
Labor	Craig Marshall	9,774	30.20	−14.10
Liberal National	Donna Kirkland	9,243	28.55	+4.75
Independent	Margaret Strelow	5,780	17.86	+17.86
One Nation	David Bond	4,382	13.54	+1.14
Legalise Cannabis	Jacinta Waller	1,279	3.95	+0.05
Greens	Mick Jones	1,241	3.83	+0.43
Family First	Fredy Johnson	671	2.07	+2.07
Total formal votes		32,370	95.55	
Informal votes		1,506	4.45	
Turnout		33,876	87.01	
Two-party-preferred result
Liberal National	Donna Kirkland	16,772	51.81	+10.41
Labor	Craig Marshall	15,598	48.19	−10.41
Liberal National gain from Labor		Swing	+10.41	

=== Sandgate ===
2024 Queensland state election: Sandgate
Party	Candidate	Votes	%	±%
Labor	Bisma Asif	15,703	45.94	−8.56
Liberal National	Chris Mangan	11,497	33.64	+6.94
Greens	Rachel Kennedy	3,896	11.40	−0.40
One Nation	Glen Barry	1,356	3.97	−1.23
Independent Democrat	Chris Simpson	892	2.61	+2.61
Family First	Russell Gee	611	1.79	+1.79
Independent	Victor Barwick	223	0.65	+0.65
Total formal votes		34,178	96.09	
Informal votes		1,389	3.91	
Turnout		35,567	91.57	
Two-party-preferred result
Labor	Bisma Asif	20,372	59.61	−7.69
Liberal National	Chris Mangan	13,806	40.39	+7.69
Labor hold		Swing	–7.69	

=== Scenic Rim ===
2024 Queensland state election: Scenic Rim
Party	Candidate	Votes	%	±%
Liberal National	Jon Krause	18,641	51.38	+3.88
Labor	Shireen Casey	7,744	21.34	−5.06
One Nation	Wayne Ziebarth	5,305	14.62	−0.38
Greens	Nicole Thompson	3,306	9.11	+1.21
Family First	Louise Austin	1,287	3.55	+3.55
Total formal votes		36,283	96.25	
Informal votes		1,415	3.75	
Turnout		37,698	89.69	
Two-party-preferred result
Liberal National	Jon Krause	23,987	66.11	+4.71
Labor	Shireen Casey	12,296	33.89	−4.71
Liberal National hold		Swing	+4.71	

=== South Brisbane ===
2024 Queensland state election: South Brisbane
Party	Candidate	Votes	%	±%
Greens	Amy MacMahon	12,146	34.71	−3.19
Labor	Barbara O'Shea	11,192	31.99	−2.41
Liberal National	Marita Parkinson	10,472	29.93	+7.13
One Nation	Richard Henderson	1,179	3.37	+1.57
Total formal votes		34,989	97.56	+0.14
Informal votes		874	2.44	−0.14
Turnout		35,863	86.04	−1.94
Two-candidate-preferred result
Labor	Barbara O'Shea	19,613	56.05	+11.40
Greens	Amy MacMahon	15,376	43.95	−11.40
Labor gain from Greens		Swing	+11.40	

=== Southern Downs ===
2024 Queensland state election: Southern Downs
Party	Candidate	Votes	%	±%
Liberal National	James Lister	17,890	53.91	+2.31
One Nation	Liz Suduk	6,085	18.33	+8.33
Labor	Greg Johnson	5,999	18.08	−7.92
Greens	David Newport	1,870	5.63	+1.53
Family First	Melinda Keller	1,344	4.05	+4.05
Total formal votes		33,188	96.33	
Informal votes		1,265	3.67	
Turnout		34,453	89.18	
Two-candidate-preferred result
Liberal National	James Lister	22,752	68.55	+4.45
One Nation	Liz Suduk	10,436	31.45	+31.45
Liberal National hold		Swing	+4.45	

=== Southport ===
2024 Queensland state election: Southport
Party	Candidate	Votes	%	±%
Liberal National	Rob Molhoek	15,183	51.41	+5.81
Labor	Letitia Del Fabbro	8,128	27.52	−6.98
One Nation	David Vaughan	2,581	8.74	+2.84
Greens	Mitch McCausland	2,574	8.71	−0.29
Family First	Ruth Fea	1,069	3.62	+3.62
Total formal votes		29,535	94.85	
Informal votes		1,605	5.15	
Turnout		31,140	84.01	
Two-party-preferred result
Liberal National	Rob Molhoek	18,060	61.15	+5.75
Labor	Letitia Del Fabbro	11,475	38.85	−5.75
Liberal National hold		Swing	+5.75	

=== Springwood ===
2024 Queensland state election: Springwood
Party	Candidate	Votes	%	±%
Labor	Mick de Brenni	13,184	41.19	−7.61
Liberal National	Susanna Damianopoulos	12,348	38.58	+4.08
Greens	Benjamin Harry	2,701	8.44	+0.94
One Nation	Glen Cookson	2,201	6.88	+1.48
Family First	Gabrielle Davis	1,114	3.48	+3.48
Independent	Karley Saidy-Hennessey	458	1.43	+1.43
Total formal votes		32,006	96.30	
Informal votes		1,230	3.70	
Turnout		33,236	90.33	
Two-party-preferred result
Labor	Mick de Brenni	16,677	52.11	−6.19
Liberal National	Susanna Damianopoulos	15,329	47.89	+6.19
Labor hold		Swing	–6.19	

=== Stafford ===
2024 Queensland state election: Stafford
Party	Candidate	Votes	%	±%
Labor	Jimmy Sullivan	13,856	38.77	−6.83
Liberal National	Fiona Hammond	13,605	38.06	+6.16
Greens	Jess Lane	6,456	18.06	+1.66
One Nation	Stuart Andrews	1,134	3.17	+0.17
Family First	Alan Denaro	692	1.94	+1.94
Total formal votes		35,743	97.36	
Informal votes		971	2.64	
Turnout		36,714	90.23	
Two-party-preferred result
Labor	Jimmy Sullivan	19,774	55.32	−6.58
Liberal National	Fiona Hammond	15,969	44.68	+6.58
Labor hold		Swing	–6.58	

=== Stretton ===
2024 Queensland state election: Stretton
Party	Candidate	Votes	%	±%
Labor	James Martin	13,347	45.58	−11.02
Liberal National	Freya Ostapovitch	9,952	33.99	+3.79
Greens	Ahmed Abdulhamed	4,154	14.19	+5.49
One Nation	Stephen Strong	1,094	3.73	−0.77
Family First	Merle Totenhofer	735	2.51	+2.51
Total formal votes		29,282	95.37	
Informal votes		1,421	4.63	
Turnout		30,703	88.75	
Two-party-preferred result
Labor	James Martin	17,434	59.54	−5.26
Liberal National	Freya Ostapovitch	11,848	40.46	+5.26
Labor hold		Swing	–5.26	

=== Surfers Paradise ===
2024 Queensland state election: Surfers Paradise
Party	Candidate	Votes	%	±%
Liberal National	John-Paul Langbroek	18,602	61.50	+3.8
Labor	James Knight	5,825	19.26	−6.24
One Nation	Mark Jaric	2,338	7.73	+1.53
Greens	Steven Everson	2,206	7.29	−0.91
Family First	Andrea Campbell	650	2.15	+2.15
Animal Justice	Haydn Jolly	627	2.07	+2.07
Total formal votes		30,248	96.05	
Informal votes		1,244	3.95	
Turnout		31,492	82.73	
Two-party-preferred result
Liberal National	John-Paul Langbroek	22,119	73.13	+6.93
Labor	James Knight	8,129	26.87	−6.93
Liberal National hold		Swing	+6.93	

=== Theodore ===
2024 Queensland state election: Theodore
Party	Candidate	Votes	%	±%
Liberal National	Mark Boothman	15,875	49.64	+5.44
Labor	Rita Anwari	8,600	26.89	−11.31
One Nation	Cassandra Duffill	2,815	8.80	+1.70
Greens	Andrew Stimson	2,350	7.35	+0.35
Animal Justice	Chloe Snyman	1,412	4.42	+4.42
Family First	Eleanor McAlpine	928	2.9	+2.9
Total formal votes		31,980	95.3	
Informal votes		1,564	4.7	
Turnout		33,544	86.44	
Two-party-preferred result
Liberal National	Mark Boothman	20,137	62.97	+9.57
Labor	Rita Anwari	11,843	37.03	−9.57
Liberal National hold		Swing	+9.57	

=== Thuringowa ===
2024 Queensland state election: Thuringowa
Party	Candidate	Votes	%	±%
Liberal National	Natalie Marr	12,970	41.81	+11.41
Labor	Aaron Harper	9,102	29.34	−7.56
Katter's Australian	Reuben Richardson	4,348	14.01	−2.09
One Nation	Steven Clare	1,996	6.43	−3.37
Greens	Roxanne Kennedy-Perriman	1,392	4.49	−0.51
Independent	Natasha Lane	1,216	3.92	+3.92
Total formal votes		31,024	95.2	
Informal votes		1,567	4.8	
Turnout		32,591	84.41	
Two-party-preferred result
Liberal National	Natalie Marr	18,592	59.93	+13.23
Labor	Aaron Harper	12,432	40.07	−13.23
Liberal National gain from Labor		Swing	+13.23	

=== Toohey ===
2024 Queensland state election: Toohey
Party	Candidate	Votes	%	±%
Labor	Peter Russo	12,319	41.77	−8.73
Liberal National	Taylor Hull	10,251	34.76	+4.66
Greens	Melissa McArdle	5,463	18.53	+6.03
One Nation	Hayden O'Brien	1,457	4.94	+1.74
Total formal votes		29,490	96.4	
Informal votes		1,113	3.6	
Turnout		30,603	88.11	
Two-party-preferred result
Labor	Peter Russo	17,408	59.03	−5.53
Liberal National	Taylor Hull	12,082	40.97	+5.53
Labor hold		Swing	–5.53	

=== Toowoomba North ===
2024 Queensland state election: Toowoomba North
Party	Candidate	Votes	%	±%
Liberal National	Trevor Watts	19,909	57.10	+7.11
Labor	James Green	8,468	24.29	−10.75
Greens	Thom Roker	2,595	7.44	+0.99
One Nation	Sebastian Lund	2,457	7.05	−0.33
Family First	Kerri Hislop	1,436	4.12	+4.12
Total formal votes		34,865	96.92	−0.6
Informal votes		1,109	3.08	+0.6
Turnout		35,974	88.96	+0.63
Two-party-preferred result
Liberal National	Trevor Watts	23,193	66.52	+9.20
Labor	James Green	11,672	33.48	−9.20
Liberal National hold		Swing	+9.20	

=== Toowoomba South ===
2024 Queensland state election: Toowoomba South
Party	Candidate	Votes	%	±%
Liberal National	David Janetzki	18,566	53.84	+2.54
Labor	Susan Krause	8,758	25.40	−5.50
Greens	Wren Beith	2,353	6.82	+0.02
One Nation	Eaton Haines	1,847	5.36	−2.26
Family First	Alexandra Todd	1,590	4.61	+4.61
Legalise Cannabis	Ingrid Weber	1,371	3.97	+3.97
Total formal votes		34,485	96.6	
Informal votes		1,224	3.4	
Turnout		35,709	89.30	
Two-party-preferred result
Liberal National	David Janetzki	21,723	62.99	+2.79
Labor	Susan Krause	12,762	37.01	−2.79
Liberal National hold		Swing	+2.79	

=== Townsville ===
2024 Queensland state election: Townsville
Party	Candidate	Votes	%	±%
Liberal National	Adam Baillie	12,346	41.24	+7.79
Labor	Scott Stewart	8,921	29.80	−6.40
Katter's Australian	Margie Ryder	3,770	12.59	+1.02
Greens	Benjamin Tiley	2,428	8.11	−0.21
One Nation	Alan Butt	1,222	4.08	−0.47
Independent	Wesley Newman	744	2.49	+2.49
Family First	William Tento	505	1.69	+1.69
Total formal votes		29,936	95.86	+0.82
Informal votes		1,294	4.14	−0.82
Turnout		31,230	82.46	−2.18
Two-party-preferred result
Liberal National	Adam Baillie	16,644	55.60	+8.72
Labor	Scott Stewart	13,292	44.40	−8.72
Liberal National gain from Labor		Swing	+8.72	

=== Traeger ===
2024 Queensland state election: Traeger
Party	Candidate	Votes	%	±%
Katter's Australian	Robbie Katter	9,831	49.32	−9.48
Liberal National	Yvonne Tunney	5,039	25.28	+9.18
Labor	Georgia Heath	3,024	15.17	−5.43
One Nation	Peter Rawle	1,349	6.77	+6.77
Greens	Louise Raynaud	689	3.46	+1.26
Total formal votes		19,932	96.61	−0.39
Informal votes		700	3.39	+0.39
Turnout		20,632	74.49	−5.48
Two-candidate-preferred result
Katter's Australian	Robbie Katter	12,703	63.73	N/A
Liberal National	Yvonne Tunney	7,229	36.27	N/A
Katter's Australian hold		Swing	N/A	

=== Warrego ===
2024 Queensland state election: Warrego
Party	Candidate	Votes	%	±%
Liberal National	Ann Leahy	16,135	61.15	+5.25
Labor	Jack Hargreaves	3,622	13.73	−5.97
One Nation	Hayley Titmarsh	2,424	9.18	+0.38
Family First	Christopher Schenk	1,396	5.29	+5.29
Legalise Cannabis	Angela Adams	1,148	4.35	+4.35
Independent	Daniel Gill	1,082	4.10	+4.10
Greens	Ian Mazlin	580	2.20	−0.10
Total formal votes		26,387	96.2	
Informal votes		1,045	3.8	
Turnout		27,432	86.98	
Two-party-preferred result
Liberal National	Ann Leahy	20,542	77.85	+4.75
Labor	Jack Hargreaves	5,845	22.15	−4.75
Liberal National hold		Swing	+4.75	

=== Waterford ===
2024 Queensland state election: Waterford
Party	Candidate	Votes	%	±%
Labor	Shannon Fentiman	14,621	47.13	−7.37
Liberal National	Jacob Heremaia	8,733	28.15	+2.75
Greens	Kirsty Petersen	2,784	8.97	+1.97
One Nation	Callum Whatmore	2,099	6.77	−2.33
Legalise Cannabis	Julius Taylor	1,509	4.86	+4.86
Family First	Karen Cloherty	1,277	4.12	+4.12
Total formal votes		31,023	94.7	
Informal votes		1,743	5.3	
Turnout		32,766	82.87	
Two-party-preferred result
Labor	Shannon Fentiman	19,002	61.25	−4.85
Liberal National	Jacob Heremaia	12,021	38.75	+4.85
Labor hold		Swing	-4.85	

=== Whitsunday ===
2024 Queensland state election: Whitsunday
Party	Candidate	Votes	%	±%
Liberal National	Amanda Camm	16,941	52.75	+19.95
Labor	Bauke Hovinga	7,264	22.62	−9.98
One Nation	Julie Hall	5,380	16.75	+7.35
Greens	Elena Quirk	1,570	4.89	+0.99
Family First	Peter Atchison	962	2.99	+2.99
Total formal votes		32,117	95.8	
Informal votes		1,420	4.2	
Turnout		33,537	86.85	
Two-party-preferred result
Liberal National	Amanda Camm	21,992	68.47	+15.17
Labor	Bauke Hovinga	10,125	31.47	−15.17
Liberal National hold		Swing	+15.17	

=== Woodridge ===
2024 Queensland state election: Woodridge
Party	Candidate	Votes	%	±%
Labor	Cameron Dick	16,093	53.61	−13.39
Liberal National	Paul Darwen	6,315	21.04	+6.04
Greens	Muhammed Ansary	3,940	13.13	+5.83
One Nation	Zoran Kazovic	2,233	7.44	−3.26
Family First	Karilyn Larsen	1,434	4.78	+4.78
Total formal votes		30,015	93.4	
Informal votes		2,137	6.6	
Turnout		32,152	79.20	
Two-party-preferred result
Labor	Cameron Dick	20,510	68.33	−7.87
Liberal National	Paul Darwen	9,505	31.67	+7.87
Labor hold		Swing	–7.87	
