= 2024 Ipswich West state by-election =

State by-election in Queensland

- 16 March 2024

Electoral district of Ipswich West in the Queensland Legislative Assembly
- Registered: 39,136
- Turnout: 31,579 (80.7% ▼6.1)
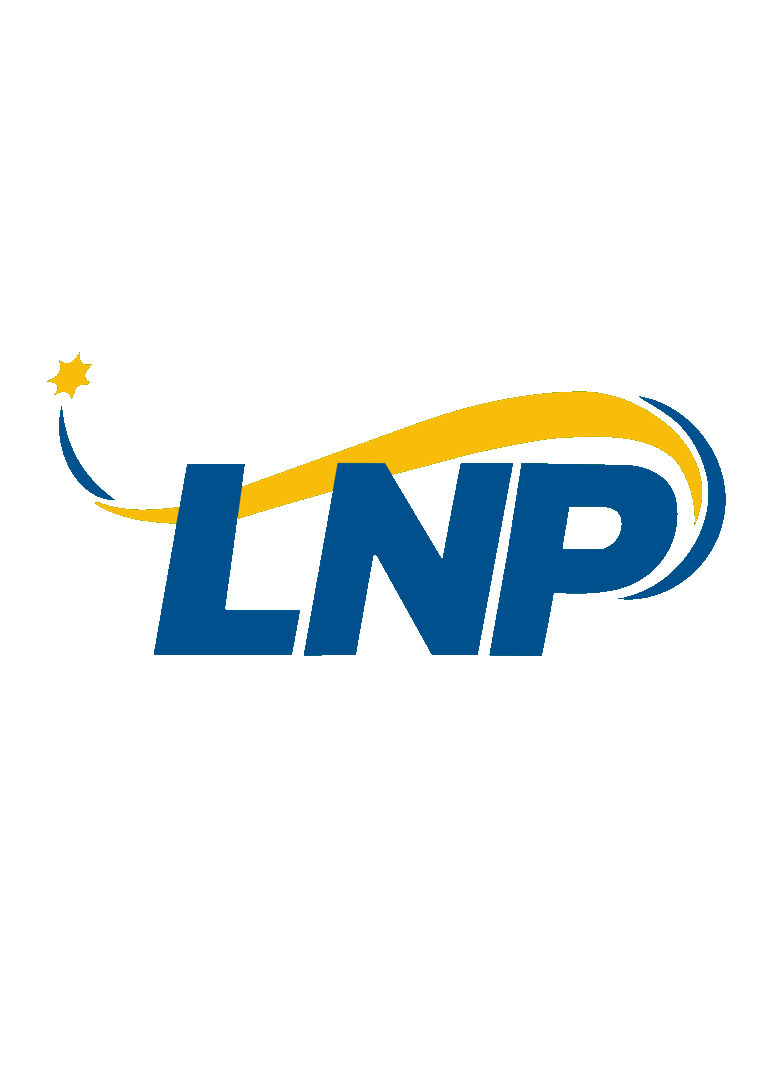

	First party	Second party
Candidate	Darren Zanow	Wendy Bourne
Party	Liberal National	Labor
Primary vote	11,676	10,349
Percentage	39.5%	35.0%
Swing	▲18.4	▼15.1
TPP	53.5%	46.5%
TPP swing	▲17.9	▼17.9
- Map of boundaries
MP before election
Jim Madden
Labor
Elected MP
Darren Zanow
Liberal National

A by-election for the electoral district of Ipswich West in the Legislative Assembly of Queensland was held on 16 March 2024 following the resignation of Labor MP Jim Madden. The by-election was held on the same day as the Inala by-election and the statewide local government elections.

Madden resigned on 26 January 2024 to contest Division 4 of Ipswich City Council at the March local government elections.

Although the seat was considered safe for the Labor Party, Liberal National candidate Darren Zanow won the by-election after a 17.9% two-party-preferred swing.

Following the by-election, Zanow was diagnosed with Microvascular Ischemic Disease, an incurable brain disease, on 16 April 2024 − the day he was formally sworn into parliament. He made his diagnosis public on 12 July and announced he would not contest the 2024 Queensland state election in October.

== Background ==
The by-election was triggered by the resignation of Labor MP Jim Madden, who had served as a member for Ipswich West since 2015 after he defeated sitting Liberal National MP Sean Choat, the first major party non-Labor MP to represent the seat since Nationals MP Albert Hales (who served between 1974 and 1977).

Madden previously announced that he would not contest the 2024 state election, but resigned whilst still in office shortly after the resignation of former premier and Inala MP Annastacia Palaszczuk.

=== Previous election results ===
2020 Queensland state election: Ipswich West
Party	Candidate	Votes	%	±%
Labor	Jim Madden	15,033	50.15	+2.88
Liberal National	Chris Green	6,328	21.11	+4.57
One Nation	Gary Duffy	4,412	14.72	−13.44
Greens	Raven Wolf	1,957	6.53	−1.50
Legalise Cannabis	Anthony Hopkins	1,361	4.54	+4.54
Civil Liberties & Motorists	Clem Grieger	565	1.88	+1.88
Independent	Karakan Kochardy	321	1.07	+1.07
Total formal votes		29,977	95.99	+0.73
Informal votes		1,252	4.01	−0.73
Turnout		31,229	86.76	−2.08
Two-party-preferred result
Labor	Jim Madden	19,289	64.35	+2.70
Liberal National	Chris Green	10,688	35.65	−2.70
Labor hold		Swing	+2.70	

== Candidates ==
Party	Candidate	Background
Legalise Cannabis	Melody Lindsay	
Liberal National	Darren Zanow	Businessman in the construction industry
One Nation	Mark Bone	
Labor	Wendy Bourne	Former president of the Rosewood & District Kindergarten

== Results ==
2024 Ipswich West state by-election
Party	Candidate	Votes	%	±%
Liberal National	Darren Zanow	11,676	39.53	+18.42
Labor	Wendy Bourne	10,349	35.04	−15.11
Legalise Cannabis	Melody Lindsay	4,302	14.57	+10.03
One Nation	Mark Bone	3,206	10.86	−3.86
Total formal votes		29,533	93.52	−2.47
Informal votes		2,046	6.48	+2.47
Turnout		31,579	80.69	−6.07
Two-party-preferred result
Liberal National	Darren Zanow	15,801	53.50	+17.85
Labor	Wendy Bourne	13,732	46.50	−17.85
Liberal National gain from Labor		Swing	+17.85	
