= 2024 Queensland state election =

- 26 October 2024

All 93 seats in the Legislative Assembly 47 seats needed for a majority
- Opinion polls
- Registered: 3,683,368
- Turnout: 3,231,968 (87.74%) (▼0.2 pp)
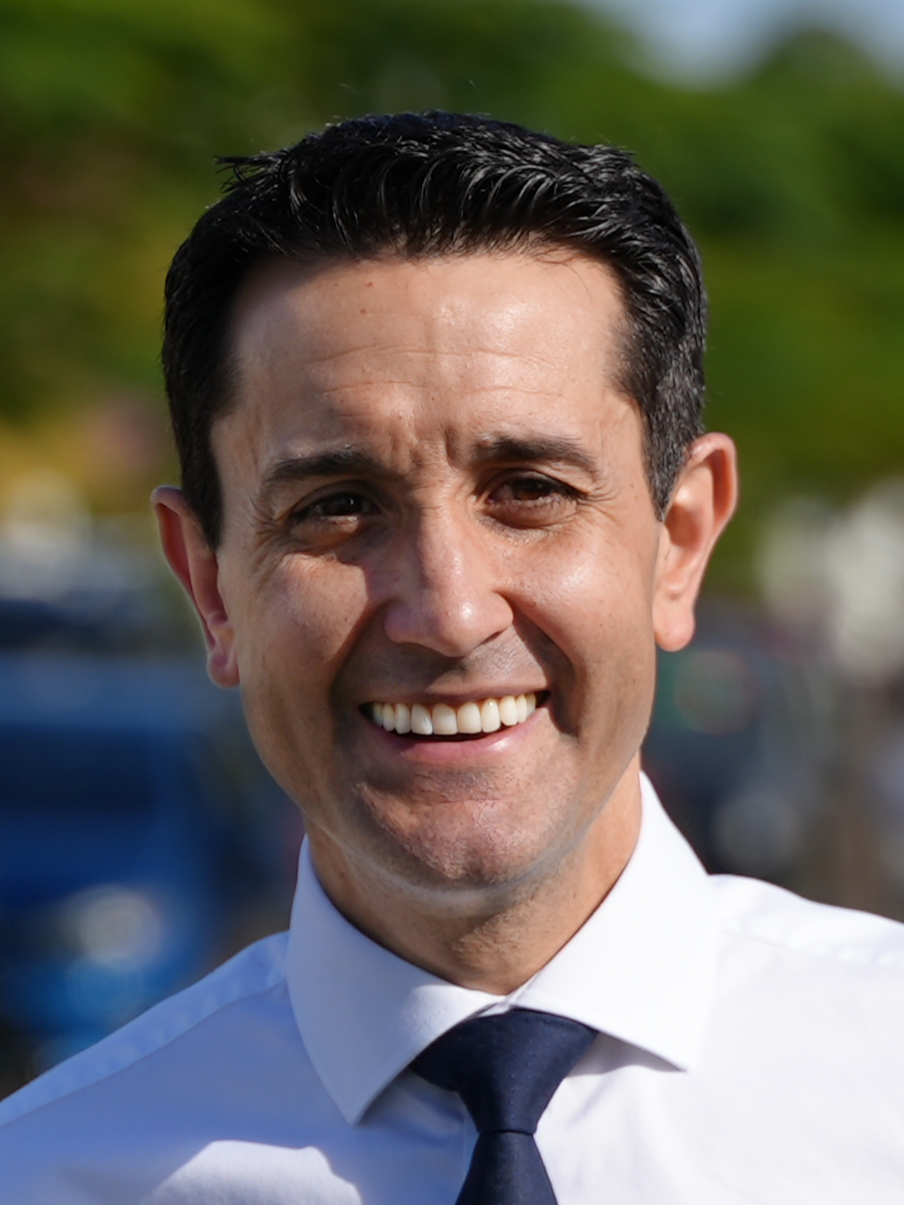

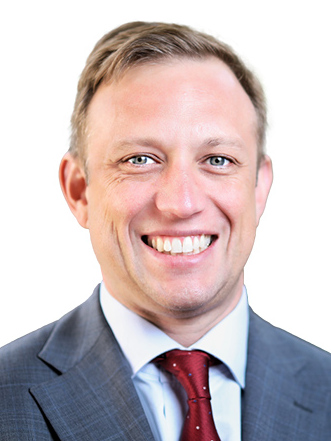

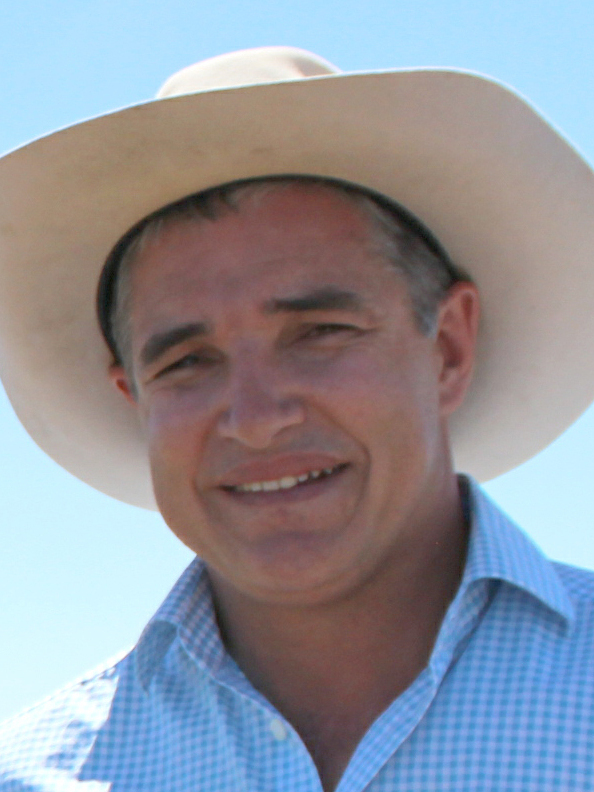

	First party	Second party
Leader	David Crisafulli	Steven Miles
Party	Liberal National	Labor
Leader since	12 November 2020	15 December 2023
Leader's seat	Broadwater	Murrumba
Last election	34 seats, 35.89%	52 seats, 39.57%
Seats before	35 (Note: Labor lost the seat of Ipswich West to the LNP at a by-election in 2024, increasing the LNP's seat total to 35 and decreasing Labor's seat total to 51.)	51
Seats won	52	36
Seat change	▲17	▼15
First-preference vote	1,289,535	1,011,211
Percentage	41.5%	32.6%
Swing	▲5.6	▼7.0
TPP	53.8%	46.2%
TPP swing	▲7.0	▼7.0
	Third party	Fourth party
Leader	Robbie Katter	No leader
Party	Katter's Australian	Greens
Leader since	2 February 2015
Leader's seat	Traeger
Last election	3 seats, 2.48%	2 seats, 9.47%
Seats before	4 (Note: MP for Mirani Stephen Andrew left One Nation after being disendorsed, and joined the KAP shortly thereafter.)	2
Seats won	3	1
Seat change	▼1	▼1
First-preference vote	75,773	307,178
Percentage	2.4%	9.9%
Swing	▼0.1	▲0.4
- Winning margin by electorate.
Premier before election
Steven Miles
Labor
Subsequent Premier
David Crisafulli
Liberal National

The 2024 Queensland state election was held on 26 October 2024 to elect all members to the Legislative Assembly of Queensland pursuant to the Constitution (Fixed Term Parliament) Amendment Act 2015. As a result of the 2016 Queensland term length referendum, the term of the parliament will run for four years.

The election was the first since 2006 to feature two men leading the major parties. The opposition Liberal National Party (LNP) led by David Crisafulli defeated the incumbent Labor government, led by Premier Steven Miles after three terms in government. Katter's Australian Party and the Queensland Greens also held seats in parliament, while other parties that contested the election included Pauline Hanson's One Nation, Legalise Cannabis Queensland, other minor parties as well as independents.

The LNP's victory was not clear until late on the night of the election count, when analysts projected Labor had lost their majority and the LNP was on track to form a majority government. Crisafulli declared victory in a late-night speech following the close of polls, however Miles initially held back on conceding pending further counting in several seats, though by the following morning he conceded defeat at a press conference.

The LNP won 52 seats in the assembly (enough for a six-seat majority), with a positive swing of over five and a half percentage points on first-preference (primary) votes translating into a net 17-seat gain. Labor by contrast had a swing against them of seven percent, losing a net 15 seats and leaving them on 36 seats. Katter's Australian Party (KAP) retained three of their seats, though former One Nation MP Stephen Andrew, who joined KAP six weeks prior to the election and boosted the party's seat figure in parliament to four, lost the seat of Mirani to the LNP. The Greens were targeting victories in multiple seats throughout metropolitan Brisbane after strong performances at the 2022 federal election, however their primary vote stagnated and the party's representation in parliament was halved, winning only one seat (Maiwar). Independent Sandy Bolton retained the seat of Noosa.

Crisafulli was sworn in as Queensland's 41st Premier by Governor Jeannette Young on 28 October, alongside his deputy Jarrod Bleijie. The pair formed an interim ministry, with the full ministry sworn in later in the week.

== Electoral system ==
Queensland has compulsory voting and uses full-preference preferential voting for single-member electorates. The election is conducted by the Electoral Commission of Queensland. The party or coalition that wins the majority of seats (at least 47) forms the government. If no majority emerges, then the party or coalition that is able to command the confidence of the Legislative Assembly forms government as a minority government.

The party or coalition that wins the second-highest number of seats forms the opposition, with the remaining parties and independent candidates being allocated to the cross bench.

The Queensland Parliament is the only unicameral state parliament in Australia, composed of the Legislative Assembly. The upper house, the Legislative Council, was abolished in 1922.

== Key dates ==
The election was for all 93 members of the Legislative Assembly. Pursuant to Constitution (Fixed Term Parliament) Amendment Act 2015 Queensland has fixed terms, with all elections following the 2020 election held every four years on the last Saturday of October. The Governor may call an election earlier than scheduled if the Government does not maintain confidence, or the annual appropriation bill fails to pass.

- Issue of election writ – Tuesday 1 October 2024, by the Governor of Queensland.
- Candidate nominations period – Wednesday 2 October to Tuesday 8 October 2024 at 12pm, local time.
- Ballot paper order draw – Tuesday 8 October 2024 at 2.30pm.
- Early voting period – Monday 14 October to Friday 25 October 2024 from 8am–6pm (excluding the weekend).
- Postal vote applications close – Monday 14 October 2024 at 7pm.
- Election Day – Saturday 26 October 2024 (from 8am–6pm).
- Postal vote return deadline – Tuesday 5 November 2024.

== Background ==
After suffering a landslide defeat at the 2012 state election, the Labor Party achieved a 37-seat swing and returned to power in Queensland at the 2015 state election under the leadership of Annastacia Palaszczuk. Initially forming a minority government, they later won a majority at the 2017 state election, and further increased their number of seats in 2020 at an election overshadowed by the COVID-19 pandemic. Palaszczuk resigned as Premier in December 2023 and was succeeded by her deputy, Steven Miles. On 16 March 2024, the first elections during his leadership, two by-elections, were held in Inala and Ipswich West. Despite being held by safe margins of 28.2% and 14.3% respectively, a massive swing against the Labor party was recorded in both seats, resulting in the margin in Inala being cut by more than 20%, and the loss of Ipswich West to the LNP.

== Registered parties ==
The following parties are registered with Queensland Electoral Commission:

- Australian Labor Party (State of Queensland)
- Liberal National Party of Queensland
- Katter's Australian Party (KAP)
- Queensland Greens
- Animal Justice Party (Queensland)
- Family First Queensland
- Legalise Cannabis Queensland (Party)
- Libertarian Party of Queensland
- Pauline Hanson's One Nation Queensland Division

== Campaign ==
The LNP campaigned heavily on four key issues, which it has labelled as crises: crime (particularly youth crime), cost-of-living, housing affordability and health. Crisafulli credited Labor's poor results at by-elections, held in March 2024, with voters' anger over Labor's handling of those key issues. After what Miles described as a "very bad result" for Labor at the two state by-elections, he accused the LNP of "sensationalising and politicising" crime to win votes.

Opinion polling and betting odds had the LNP as the firm favourites to win the election in a landslide, with Miles himself conceding that it was "very likely" that Labor would lose the election, whilst also criticising Crisafulli's "small target strategy" and claiming he had a lack of plans despite likely becoming the state's next Premier. An opinion poll conducted by YouGov and released on 26 April 2024 saw Labor record a two-party-preferred vote of just 44%, while Miles had a net negative approval rating of –22%, marking the worst opinion poll result for a Queensland Premier in 20 years.

In August 2024, Miles announced a policy of state-owned petrol stations, while Crisafulli promised to re-introduce optional preferential voting, which was previously used in Queensland from 1992 to 2015, and is currently used at a state level in New South Wales and Tasmania.

The lack of affordable rentals, and rent increases emerged as a major issue over the campaign. In Brisbane, median advertised rents increased by 49 per cent from the start of the COVID pandemic to December 2023.

On 26 September Miles suggested Labor would consider introducing a cap of 10% on the amount rent can increase each year. Miles subsequently came under pressure by property industry lobbyists to rule out the policy, with Queensland Greens MP, Amy MacMahon commenting “Make no mistake, the only reason Labor is finally considering something they've opposed for years is because they're under massive pressure from the Greens this election,”. Support for rent caps was expressed by social housing peak body Queensland Shelter.

A YouGov poll commissioned by the Queensland Greens published by Seven News on 2 October and the Courier Mail 3 October indicated 54% of Queenslanders polled supported rent increases being capped at 1% annually, with 60% of Labor voters, 44% of LNP voters and 70% of Greens voters supporting the policy.

A leaders debate was held on the 3rd of October broadcast by Channel 9, 4BC radio and the Brisbane Times. An online reader poll with 64,000 votes conducted by the Brisbane Times declared opposition Leader David Crisafulli won the debate with 57% of the vote.

Miles and Crisafulli ruled out introducing a rent cap during the leaders debate.

On 2 October 2024, Labor's Miles announced a policy of a state-owned energy retailer. On 13 October 2024, Labor announced a policy of Free school meals.

A second leaders debate between the LNP and ALP leaders was held on the 16th of October.

A final leaders debate between the ALP and LNP leaders was hosted by Sky News and The Courier-Mail People's Forum on 22 October. The debate consisted of 100 undecided voters picked by YouGov, who would then be chosen to ask questions to the leaders. The results of the debate are as follows: 39% Miles, 35% Crisafulli, and 26% still undecided.

=== Controversy ===
Some candidates attracted controversy during the course of the campaign, in particular for insensitivity regarding Nazi symbolism.

== Results ==
36	1	1	3	52
ALP	GRN	IND	KAP	LNP

Legislative Assembly (IRV) – Turnout TBD (CV)
Party	Votes	%	Swing	Seats	+/–
Liberal National	1,289,535	41.52	+5.63	52	▲17
Labor	1,011,211	32.56	−7.01	36	▼15
Greens	307,178	9.89	+0.42	1	▼1
One Nation	248,334	8.00	+0.88	0	Steady
Katter's Australian	75,773	2.44	–0.08	3	▼1
Family First	57,826	1.86	+1.86	0	Steady
Independents	52,657	1.69	−0.79	1	Steady
Legalise Cannabis	49,621	1.60	+0.69	0	Steady
Animal Justice	9,669	0.31	−0.03	0	Steady
Libertarian	4,141	0.13	+0.13	0	Steady
Formal votes	3,105,945	96.10	−0.50		
Informal votes	126,023	3.90	+0.50		
Total	3,231,968	100		93	
Registered voters / turnout	3,683,368	87.74	−0.17		
Two-party-preferred vote
Liberal National	1,669,799	53.8	+7.0		
Labor	1,436,146	46.2	−7.0		

=== Seats changing hands ===
Members in italics did not recontest their seats.

Seat	Pre-election			Swing	Post-election		
Seat	Party	Member	Margin	Swing	Margin	Member	Party
Barron River	Labor	Craig Crawford	3.1	6.8	3.7	Bree James	Liberal National
Caloundra	Labor	Jason Hunt	2.5	4.3	1.8	Kendall Morton	Liberal National
Capalaba	Labor	Don Brown	9.8	11.7	1.9	Russell Field	Liberal National
Cook	Labor	Cynthia Lui	6.3	11.2	5.0	David Kempton	Liberal National
Hervey Bay	Labor	Adrian Tantari	2.0	10.4	8.4	David Lee	Liberal National
Ipswich West	Liberal National	Darren Zanow (Note: Zanow was elected at the 2024 Ipswich West state by-election after the resignation of Labor MP Jim Madden. The LNP's margin at the by-election was 3.5%.)	14.4 (ALP)	10.4 (LNP)	3.9	Wendy Bourne	Labor
Keppel	Labor	Brittany Lauga	5.6	16.1	10.5	Nigel Hutton	Liberal National
Mackay	Labor	Julieanne Gilbert	6.7	17.2	10.4	Nigel Dalton	Liberal National
Maryborough	Labor	Bruce Saunders	11.9	14.6	2.7	John Barounis	Liberal National
Mirani	Katter's Australian	Stephen Andrew (Note: Andrew was elected as a One Nation member but left to join Katter's Australian Party (KAP) after his disendorsement.)	9.0 (ONP)	50.9	0.9	Glen Kelly	Liberal National
Mulgrave	Labor	Curtis Pitt	12.2	15.4	3.1	Terry James	Liberal National
Mundingburra	Labor	Les Walker	3.9	13.3	9.4	Janelle Poole	Liberal National
Nicklin	Labor	Robert Skelton	0.1	2.8	2.7	Marty Hunt	Liberal National
Pumicestone	Labor	Ali King	5.3	5.7	0.4	Ariana Doolan	Liberal National
Redcliffe	Labor	Yvette D'Ath	6.1	9.2	3.1	Kerri-Anne Dooley	Liberal National
Redlands	Labor	Kim Richards	3.9	5.8	1.9	Rebecca Young	Liberal National
Rockhampton	Labor	Barry O'Rourke	8.6	10.4	1.8	Donna Kirkland	Liberal National
South Brisbane	Greens	Amy MacMahon	5.3	11.4	6.1	Barbara O'Shea	Labor
Thuringowa	Labor	Aaron Harper	3.2	13.2	9.9	Natalie Marr	Liberal National
Townsville	Labor	Scott Stewart	3.1	8.7	5.6	Adam Baillie	Liberal National

== Candidates ==
A total of 525 candidates from nine political parties, plus independents, contested this election. It became the second-most contested election by nominated candidates in Queensland history, behind the previous election (2020).

Crisafulli began announcing LNP candidates 18 months prior to the election, making the LNP the first party to formally endorse candidates for the election. The second party to formally endorse a candidate was Katter's Australian Party (KAP), announcing their candidate for the Far North Queensland seat of Cook on 6 October 2023.

Labor, the LNP, One Nation, and the Greens each ran candidates in all 93 electorates.

=== Preferences ===
Candidates and parties may publish recommendations to voters on How-to-vote cards and other materials indicating how that candidate or party suggests a voter should order their ballot under the state's full-preference instant-runoff voting system. Voters must number every candidate on the ballot paper to cast a formal vote. A candidate or party cannot determine the order a vote is distributed for a voter. "Preference deals" refer to parties or candidates agreeing to order recommendations on each other's how-to-vote materials that are mutually favourable.

==== Liberal National ====
In late 2023, it was reported in The Australian that Leader of the Opposition David Crisafulli considered preferencing the Greens over Labor at the upcoming state election. Crisafulli told the newspaper: "Now, the same doesn't happen on the other side of the draw – the preferences on the right don't flow in the same way that the Greens' preferences flow to Labor," adding: "So it is a corrupt system... and I have a big concern about the prospect of a Labor–Greens coalition. They will say no deals... but they've said that before and they then broke the promise anyway. So I am deeply concerned by that."

On 1 October 2024, the LNP officially announced they would recommend preferencing Labor ahead of the Greens at the election.

==== One Nation ====
One Nation leader and federal Senator for Queensland, Pauline Hanson, confirmed in February 2024 that One Nation would recommend voters preference the LNP over Labor in every seat, despite her reported distrust of both major parties.

==== Labor ====
Retiring Labor MP and Attorney-General Yvette D’Ath claimed on 24 August that the Greens were "happy to do deals" with the LNP to get more members elected to parliament. Ms D'Ath issued a plea to voters to not replace Labor MPs with Greens members, and refused to concede that the polling showed a swing towards the Greens among inner-city residents.

Labor recommended preferences to Legalise Cannabis ahead of the Greens in 28 seats.

==== Greens ====
The Queensland Greens had previously ruled out doing any preference deal with the LNP in 2024.

==== Katter ====
Katter's Australian Party recommended preferences to the LNP in North Queensland seats it had contested.

== Retiring members ==
=== Labor ===
- Yvette D'Ath (Redcliffe) – announced retirement on 22 February 2024, citing the need to find more balance in her life.
- Julieanne Gilbert (Mackay) – announced retirement on 25 July 2024.
- Stirling Hinchliffe (Sandgate) – announced retirement on 11 October 2023.
- Barry O'Rourke (Rockhampton) – announced retirement on 13 November 2023, citing health issues.
- Curtis Pitt (Mulgrave) – announced retirement on 22 August 2024.

=== Liberal National ===
- Michael Hart (Burleigh) – announced retirement on 6 September 2023.
- Lachlan Millar (Gregory) – announced retirement on 18 October 2023.
- Mark Robinson (Oodgeroo) – announced retirement on 16 June 2023.
- Darren Zanow (Ipswich West) – announced retirement on 12 July 2024, due to his diagnosis of Microvascular ischemic disease.

== Electoral pendulum ==
=== Pre-election pendulum ===
Extended content

This is a pre-election pendulum for the 2024 Queensland state election. Members in italics are not contesting the election. By-elections were held in four seats during this term of Parliament that changed their margins. See the footnotes for details.

Government seats
Marginal
Bundaberg	Tom Smith	ALP	0.01
Nicklin	Robert Skelton	ALP	0.1
Hervey Bay	Adrian Tantari	ALP	2.0
Caloundra	Jason Hunt	ALP	2.5
Barron River	Craig Crawford	ALP	3.1
Townsville	Scott Stewart	ALP	3.1
Thuringowa	Aaron Harper	ALP	3.2
Redlands	Kim Richards	ALP	3.9
Mundingburra	Les Walker	ALP	3.9
Aspley	Bart Mellish	ALP	5.2
Pumicestone	Ali King	ALP	5.3
Cairns	Michael Healy	ALP	5.6
Keppel	Brittany Lauga	ALP	5.6
Fairly safe
Redcliffe	Yvette D'Ath	ALP	6.1
Cook	Cynthia Lui	ALP	6.3
Inala	Margie Nightingale	ALP	6.7 (Note: In 2024 there was a by-election after Annastacia Palaszczuk resigned from her seat. This 2CP vote is based on that by-election result.)
Mackay	Julieanne Gilbert	ALP	6.7
Pine Rivers	Nikki Boyd	ALP	6.7
Mansfield	Corrine McMillan	ALP	6.8
Gaven	Meaghan Scanlon	ALP	7.8
Springwood	Mick de Brenni	ALP	8.3
Rockhampton	Barry O'Rourke	ALP	8.6
Macalister	Melissa McMahon	ALP	9.5
Capalaba	Don Brown	ALP	9.8
Safe
Cooper	Jonty Bush	ALP	10.5
Ferny Grove	Mark Furner	ALP	11.0
McConnel	Grace Grace	ALP	11.1
Murrumba	Steven Miles	ALP	11.3
Bulimba	Di Farmer	ALP	11.4
Maryborough	Bruce Saunders	ALP	11.9
Stafford	Jimmy Sullivan	ALP	11.9
Mulgrave	Curtis Pitt	ALP	12.2
Mount Ommaney	Jess Pugh	ALP	12.6
Bancroft	Chris Whiting	ALP	12.8
Kurwongbah	Shane King	ALP	13.1
Greenslopes	Joe Kelly	ALP	13.2
Logan	Linus Power	ALP	13.4
Lytton	Joan Pease	ALP	13.4
Miller	Mark Bailey	ALP	13.8
Stretton	James Martin	ALP	13.9 (Note: In 2021 there was a by-election after the death of Duncan Pegg. This 2CP vote is based on that by-election result.)
Toohey	Peter Russo	ALP	14.4
Nudgee	Leanne Linard	ALP	15.1
Waterford	Shannon Fentiman	ALP	16.0
Ipswich	Jennifer Howard	ALP	16.5
Morayfield	Mark Ryan	ALP	16.7
Jordan	Charis Mullen	ALP	17.1
Sandgate	Stirling Hinchliffe	ALP	17.3
Algester	Leeanne Enoch	ALP	17.8
Bundamba	Lance McCallum	ALP v ONP	20.7
Gladstone	Glenn Butcher	ALP	23.5
Woodridge	Cameron Dick	ALP	26.2

Non-government seats
Marginal
Currumbin	Laura Gerber	LNP	0.5
Coomera	Michael Crandon	LNP	1.1
Burleigh	Michael Hart	LNP	1.2
Chatsworth	Steve Minnikin	LNP	1.3
Glass House	Andrew Powell	LNP	1.6
Clayfield	Tim Nicholls	LNP	1.6
Everton	Tim Mander	LNP	2.2
Whitsunday	Amanda Camm	LNP	3.3
Theodore	Mark Boothman	LNP	3.3
Ipswich West	Darren Zanow	LNP	3.5 (Note: In 2024 there was a by-election after Labor MP Jim Madden resigned from his seat. This 2CP vote is based on that by-election result.)
Moggill	Christian Rowan	LNP	3.6
Ninderry	Dan Purdie	LNP	4.1
Mermaid Beach	Ray Stevens	LNP	4.4
Oodgeroo	Mark Robinson	LNP	4.5
Buderim	Brent Mickelberg	LNP	5.3
Southport	Rob Molhoek	LNP	5.4
Fairly safe
Burdekin	Dale Last	LNP	7.0
Toowoomba North	Trevor Watts	LNP	7.3
Gympie	Tony Perrett	LNP	8.5
Maroochydore	Fiona Simpson	LNP	9.1
Kawana	Jarrod Bleijie	LNP	9.3
Safe
Bonney	Sam O'Connor	LNP	10.1
Mudgeeraba	Ros Bates	LNP	10.1
Toowoomba South	David Janetzki	LNP	10.2
Burnett	Stephen Bennett	LNP	10.8
Scenic Rim	Jon Krause	LNP	11.4
Lockyer	Jim McDonald	LNP	11.5
Nanango	Deb Frecklington	LNP	12.2
Southern Downs	James Lister	LNP	14.1
Surfers Paradise	John-Paul Langbroek	LNP	16.2
Broadwater	David Crisafulli	LNP	16.6
Gregory	Lachlan Millar	LNP	17.2
Condamine	Pat Weir	LNP	19.2
Callide	Bryson Head	LNP	21.7 (Note: In 2022 there was a by-election after Colin Boyce was elected to the seat of Flynn in the 2022 Australian Federal Election. This 2CP vote is based on that by-election result.)
Warrego	Ann Leahy	LNP	23.1
Crossbench seats
South Brisbane	Amy MacMahon	GRN v ALP	5.3
Maiwar	Michael Berkman	GRN v LNP	6.3
Mirani	Stephen Andrew	ONP v ALP	9.0
Hinchinbrook	Nick Dametto	KAP v LNP	14.8
Noosa	Sandy Bolton	IND v LNP	15.8
Hill	Shane Knuth	KAP v ALP	22.5
Traeger	Robbie Katter	KAP v ALP	24.7

=== Post-election pendulum ===
Extended content

Government seats (52)
Marginal
Pumicestone	Ariana Doolan	LNP	0.4%
Mirani	Glen Kelly	LNP	1.0% v KAP
Caloundra	Kendall Morton	LNP	1.8%
Rockhampton	Donna Kirkland	LNP	1.8%
Redlands	Rebecca Young	LNP	1.9%
Capalaba	Russell Field	LNP	1.9%
Mulgrave	Terry James	LNP	2.7%
Nicklin	Marty Hunt	LNP	2.7%
Maryborough	John Barounis	LNP	2.8%
Redcliffe	Kerri-Anne Dooley	LNP	2.9%
Clayfield	Tim Nicholls	LNP	3.5%
Barron River	Bree James	LNP	3.7%
Cook	David Kempton	LNP	5.0%
Everton	Tim Mander	LNP	5.3%
Townsville	Adam Baillie	LNP	5.6%
Moggill	Christian Rowan	LNP	5.6%
Fairly safe
Hervey Bay	David Lee	LNP	8.4%
Chatsworth	Steve Minnikin	LNP	8.5%
Mundingburra	Janelle Poole	LNP	9.2%
Buderim	Brent Mickelberg	LNP	9.3%
Thuringowa	Natalie Marr	LNP	9.9%
Safe
Coomera	Michael Crandon	LNP	10.0%
Glass House	Andrew Powell	LNP	10.2%
Mackay	Nigel Dalton	LNP	10.2%
Ninderry	Dan Purdie	LNP	10.5%
Keppel	Nigel Hutton	LNP	10.5%
Maroochydore	Fiona Simpson	LNP	10.9%
Southport	Rob Molhoek	LNP	11.2%
Oodgeroo	Amanda Stoker	LNP	11.8%
Currumbin	Laura Gerber	LNP	12.3%
Kawana	Jarrod Bleijie	LNP	12.7%
Burleigh	Hermann Vorster	LNP	12.8%
Theodore	Mark Boothman	LNP	13.0%
Toowoomba South	David Janetzki	LNP	13.0%
Mermaid Beach	Ray Stevens	LNP	13.1%
Bonney	Sam O'Connor	LNP	13.7%
Mudgeeraba	Ros Bates	LNP	13.9%
Gympie	Tony Perrett	LNP	14.8%
Burnett	Stephen Bennett	LNP	15.4%
Burderkin	Dale Last	LNP	15.8%
Scenic Rim	Jon Krause	LNP	16.1%
Toowoomba North	Trevor Watts	LNP	16.5%
Whitsunday	Amanda Camm	LNP	18.5%
Southern Downs	James Lister	LNP	18.6% v ONP
Lockyer	Jim McDonald	LNP	19.2%
Very safe
Gregory	Sean Dillon	LNP	21.0%
Broadwater	David Crisafulli	LNP	21.3%
Nanango	Deb Frecklington	LNP	22.9%
Surfers Paradise	John-Paul Langbroek	LNP	23.1%
Callide	Bryson Head	LNP	23.2%
Condamine	Pat Weir	LNP	23.6%
Warrego	Ann Leahy	LNP	27.9%

Non-government seats (36)
Marginal
Aspley	Bart Mellish	ALP	0.04%
Gaven	Meaghan Scanlon	ALP	0.7%
Pine Rivers	Nikki Boyd	ALP	0.7%
Bundaberg	Tom Smith	ALP	1.5%
Macalister	Melissa McMahon	ALP	1.9%
Springwood	Mick de Brenni	ALP	2.1%
Cairns	Michael Healy	ALP	2.5%
Lytton	Joan Pease	ALP	3.0%
Ipswich West	Wendy Bourne	ALP	3.9%
Logan	Linus Power	ALP	4.3%
Mansfield	Corrine McMillan	ALP	4.9%
Stafford	Jimmy Sullivan	ALP	5.3%
Kurwongbah	Shane King	ALP	5.9%
Fairly safe
Bancroft	Chris Whiting	ALP	6.0%
South Brisbane	Barbara O'Shea	ALP	6.1% v GRN
Morayfield	Mark Ryan	ALP	7.1%
Mount Ommaney	Jess Pugh	ALP	7.3%
Algester	Leeanne Enoch	ALP	7.5%
Ferny Grove	Mark Furner	ALP	7.9%
Bulimba	Di Farmer	ALP	8.2%
McConnel	Grace Grace	ALP	8.8%
Ipswich	Jennifer Howard	ALP	8.9%
Toohey	Peter Russo	ALP	9.0%
Gladstone	Glenn Butcher	ALP	9.2%
Stretton	James Martin	ALP	9.5%
Sandgate	Bisma Asif	ALP	9.6%
Murrumba	Steven Miles	ALP	9.8%
Greenslopes	Joe Kelly	ALP	9.8%
Safe
Jordan	Charis Mullen	ALP	10.0%
Miller	Mark Bailey	ALP	10.6%
Cooper	Jonty Bush	ALP	11.2%
Waterford	Shannon Fentiman	ALP	11.3%
Nudgee	Leanne Linard	ALP	12.0%
Inala	Margie Nightingale	ALP	12.6%
Bundamba	Lance McCallum	ALP	13.8%
Woodridge	Cameron Dick	ALP	18.3%
Crossbench seats (5)
Maiwar	Michael Berkman	GRN	3.4% v LNP
Noosa	Sandy Bolton	IND	8.5% v LNP
Hinchinbrook	Nick Dametto	KAP	13.2% v LNP
Hill	Shane Knuth	KAP	13.7% v LNP
Traeger	Robbie Katter	KAP	13.7% v LNP

== Opinion polling ==
In the lead-up to the state election, polling companies conduct regular opinion polls for various news organisations. These polls collect data on parties' primary vote, and contain an estimation of the two-party-preferred vote. They also ask questions about the electorates' views on major party leaders.

Some polls do not publish a two-party-preferred result. In these cases, the result has been manually calculated from preference flows at the 2020 election.

=== Voting intention ===
Legislative Assembly polling
Date	Firm	Sample	Primary vote						2pp vote	
Date	Firm	Sample	ALP	LNP	GRN	ONP	KAP	OTH	ALP	LNP
26 October 2024 election			32.6%	41.5%	9.9%	8.0%	2.4%	5.6%	46.2%	53.8%
24 October 2024	uComms	3,651	33.6%	39.3%	12.9%	7.8%	2.9%	3.5%	49%	51%
18–24 October 2024	Newspoll	1,151	33%	42%	11%	8%	—N/a	6%	47.5%	52.5%
14–19 October 2024	Resolve Strategic	1,003	32%	40%	11%	9%	2%	6%	47%	53%
10–16 October 2024	YouGov	1,503	31%	41%	11%	11%	1%	5%	45%	55%
15 October 2024	The Courier-Mail	1,000	30%	48.2%	8.6%	7.3%	1.5%	4.4%	42%	58%
26–29 September 2024	Freshwater Strategy	1,062	30%	43%	12%	8%	—N/a	7%	44%	56%
12–18 September 2024	Newspoll	1,047	30%	42%	12%	8%	—N/a	8%	45%	55%
June – September 2024	Resolve Strategic	939	23%	44%	12%	8%	1%	12%	41.5%	58.5%
6–29 August 2024	Wolf & Smith	1,724	24%	42%	12%	8%	3%	11%	43%	57%
May – August 2024	RedBridge	829	29%	42%	11%	—N/a	—N/a	18%	45.5%	54.5%
8–15 July 2024	YouGov	1,019	26%	43%	14%	13%	1%	3%	43%	57%
February – May 2024	RedBridge	880	28%	47%	12%	—N/a	—N/a	13%	43%	57%
February – May 2024	Resolve Strategic	947	26%	43%	13%	8%	1%	9%	44.5%	55.5%
9–17 April 2024	YouGov	1,092	27%	44%	15%	10%	1%	3%	44%	56%
16 March 2024	The local government elections are held, LNP wins Ipswich West by-election and Labor holds its seat in Inala.									
7–13 March 2024	Newspoll	1,037	30%	42%	13%	8%	—N/a	7%	46%	54%
13 February 2024	uComms	1,743	34.2%	37.3%	12.2%	7.7%	3.9%	4.7%	50%	50%
26 December 2023	uComms	1,911	34.4%	36.2%	—N/a	—N/a	—N/a	—N/a	49%	51%
15 December 2023	Steven Miles is elected leader of Queensland Labor; sworn in as Premier of Queensland.									
13 December 2023	uComms	1,143	34%	38.2%	11.9%	7.8%	3.3%	4.8%	48%	52%
10 December 2023	Annastacia Palaszczuk announces her intention to resign as leader of Queensland Labor and Premier of Queensland.									
September – December 2023	Resolve Strategic	940	33%	37%	12%	8%	—N/a	10%	49.5%	50.5%
4–10 October 2023	YouGov	1,013	33%	41%	13%	8%	2%	3%	48%	52%
26 August – 6 September 2023	RedBridge	2,012	26%	41%	14%	9%	—N/a	10%	45%	55%
May – August 2023	Resolve Strategic	943	32%	38%	11%	8%	1%	10% (Note: Independents: 8%, Other parties: 2%)	48%	52%
29 June – 2 July 2023	Freshwater Strategy	1,065	34%	40%	11%	—N/a	—N/a	15%	49%	51%
17 January – 17 April 2023	Resolve Strategic	943	35%	33%	12%	7%	1%	11% (Note: Independents: 10%, Other parties: 1%)	52.5%	47.5%
30 March – 5 April 2023	YouGov	1,015	33%	39%	13%	10%	2%	—N/a	49%	51%
1–8 December 2022	YouGov	~1,000	34%	38%	13%	11%	—N/a	4%	50%	50%
21 August – 4 December 2022	Resolve Strategic	924	37%	35%	11%	6%	1%	10% (Note: Independents: 7%, Other parties: 3%)	53.2%	46.8%
23–30 June 2022	YouGov	~1,000	34%	38%	14%	10%	1%	3%	50%	50%
18–23 February 2022	YouGov	~1,000	39%	38%	10%	8%	1%	4%	52%	48%
31 October 2020 election			39.6%	35.9%	9.5%	7.1%	2.5%	5.7%	53.2%	46.8%

=== Preferred Premier and satisfaction ===
==== Preferred Premier ====
Date	Polling firm	Sample	Preferred Premier		
Date	Polling firm	Sample	Miles	Crisafulli	Don't know
18–24 October 2024	Newspoll	1,151	45%	42%	13%
14–19 October 2024	Resolve Strategic	1,003	37%	39%	24%
10–16 October 2024	YouGov	1,503	36%	37%	27%
26–29 September 2024	Freshwater Strategy	1,062	38%	46%	16%
12–18 September 2024	Newspoll	1,047	39%	46%	15%
June – September 2024	Resolve Strategic	939	27%	40%	33%
8–15 July 2024	YouGov	1,019	29%	40%	31%
February – May 2024	Resolve Strategic	947	28%	39%	33%
9–17 April 2024	YouGov	1,092	27%	40%	33%
7–13 March 2024	Newspoll	1,037	37%	43%	20%
13 February 2024	uComms	1,743	49%	51%	—N/a
26 December 2023	uComms	1,911	47.8%	52.2%	—N/a
Date	Polling firm	Sample	Preferred Premier		
Date	Polling firm	Sample	Palaszczuk	Crisafulli	Don't know
September – December 2023	Resolve Strategic	940	34%	39%	27%
10 November 2023	SEC Newgate	600	30%	34%	36%
4–10 October 2023	YouGov	1,013	35%	37%	28%
December 2023	Resolve Strategic	940	34%	39%	27%
May – August 2023	Resolve Strategic	943	36%	37%	27%
29 June – 2 July 2023	AFR/Freshwater Strategy	1,065	44%	45%	11%
17 January – 17 April 2023	Resolve Strategic	943	39%	31%	31%
30 March – 5 April 2023	YouGov	1,015	31%	29%	40%
1–8 December 2022	YouGov	~1,000	39%	28%	33%
21 August – 4 December 2022	Resolve Strategic	924	42%	30%	28%
23–30 June 2022	YouGov	~1,000	41%	28%	31%

==== Satisfaction ratings ====
Date	Polling firm	Sample	Miles				Crisafulli			
Date	Polling firm	Sample	Satisfied	Dissatisfied	Don't Know	Net	Satisfied	Dissatisfied	Don't Know	Net
18–24 October 2024	Newspoll	1,151	45%	48%	7%	–3%	43%	46%	11%	–3%
14–19 October 2024	Resolve Strategic	1,003	—N/a	—N/a	—N/a	+8%	—N/a	—N/a	—N/a	+7%
10–16 October 2024	YouGov	1,503	34%	44%	22%	–10%	38%	32%	30%	+6%
4–16 October 2024	RedBridge Group	2,315	35%	44%	21%	–9%	40%	31%	29%	+9%
12–18 September 2024	Newspoll	1,047	41%	51%	8%	–10%	49%	37%	14%	+12%
June – September 2024	Resolve Strategic	939	—N/a	—N/a	—N/a	–13%	—N/a	—N/a	—N/a	+18%
May – August 2024	RedBridge	829	—N/a	—N/a	—N/a	–12%	—N/a	—N/a	—N/a	+14%
8–15 July 2024	YouGov	1,019	31%	44%	25%	–13%	40%	23%	37%	+17%
February – May 2024	RedBridge	880	—N/a	—N/a	—N/a	–11%	—N/a	—N/a	—N/a	+14%
February – May 2024	Resolve Strategic	947	—N/a	—N/a	—N/a	–15%	—N/a	—N/a	—N/a	+14%
9–17 April 2024	YouGov	1,092	25%	47%	28%	–22%	40%	26%	34%	+14%
7–13 March 2024	Newspoll	1,037	38%	49%	13%	–11%	47%	33%	20%	+14%
13 February 2024	uComms	1,743	44.2%	25.2%	25.2%	+19%	41.7%	18.7%	31.2%	+23%
13 December 2023	uComms	1,143	38.4%	25.9%	35.6%	+12.5%	—N/a	—N/a	—N/a	—N/a
Date	Polling firm	Sample	Palaszczuk				Crisafulli			
Date	Polling firm	Sample	Satisfied	Dissatisfied	Don't Know	Net	Satisfied	Dissatisfied	Don't Know	Net
September – December 2023	Resolve Strategic	940	—N/a	—N/a	—N/a	–17%	—N/a	—N/a	—N/a	+9%
4–10 October 2023	YouGov	1,013	32%	52%	16%	–20%	37%	26%	37%	+11%
September – December 2023	Resolve Strategic	940	—N/a	—N/a	—N/a	–17%	—N/a	—N/a	—N/a	+9%
May – August 2023	Resolve Strategic	943	—N/a	—N/a	—N/a	–15%	—N/a	—N/a	—N/a	+7%
29 June – 2 July 2023	AFR/Freshwater Strategy	1,065	39%	47%	14%	–8%	—N/a	—N/a	—N/a	—N/a
1–8 December 2022	YouGov	~1,000	40%	41%	19%	–1%	31%	27%	42%	+4%
23–30 June 2022	YouGov	~1,000	45%	30%	16%	+15%	31%	23%	46%	+8%
18–23 February 2022	YouGov	~1,000	50%	36%	14%	+14%	—N/a	—N/a	—N/a	—N/a

== See also ==
- List of political parties in Queensland
- Crisafulli ministry
- 2024 Queensland Labor Party leadership election
