= Darren Zanow =

Australian politician

Darren Zanow MP

Member of the Queensland Legislative Assembly for Ipswich West
- In office 16 March 2024 – 26 October 2024
- Preceded by: Jim Madden
- Succeeded by: Wendy Bourne

Personal details
- Born: Darren William Zanow
- Party: Liberal National
- Website: Personal website (archived 12 July 2024)

Darren William Zanow is an Australian politician who served as the member for Ipswich West in the Legislative Assembly of Queensland for seven months in 2024.

== Career ==
=== Pre-politics ===
Before entering politics, Zanow was the owner of Zanow's Concrete and Quarries, a concrete business founded by his father Viv. Zanow owned quarries in Coominya, Fernvale and North Booval, which were all damaged in the 2011 Queensland floods.

He was also the president of the Ipswich Show Society.

=== Political career ===
Zanow was announced as the Liberal National Party's candidate for the 2024 Ipswich West state by-election on 3 February 2024.

Although the seat was considered traditionally safe for the Labor Party, Zanow won the by-election on 16 March after a 17.9% two-party-preferred swing.

On 16 April 2024 − the day he was formally sworn into parliament − Zanow was diagnosed with Microvascular Ischemic Disease, an incurable brain disease. He made his diagnosis public on 12 July and announced he would not contest the 2024 Queensland state election in October. The division was subsequently won by Labor, despite the election of a Liberal National government.

== Personal life ==
Zanow has one daughter, Lola.

Parliament of Queensland
Preceded by Jim Madden	Member for Ipswich West; 2024–2024	Succeeded by Wendy Bourne
