= 2024 Inala state by-election =

Queensland, Australia, legislative by-election

- 16 March 2024

Electoral district of Inala in the Queensland Legislative Assembly
- Registered: 38,870
- Turnout: 30,065 (77.3% ▼9.5)

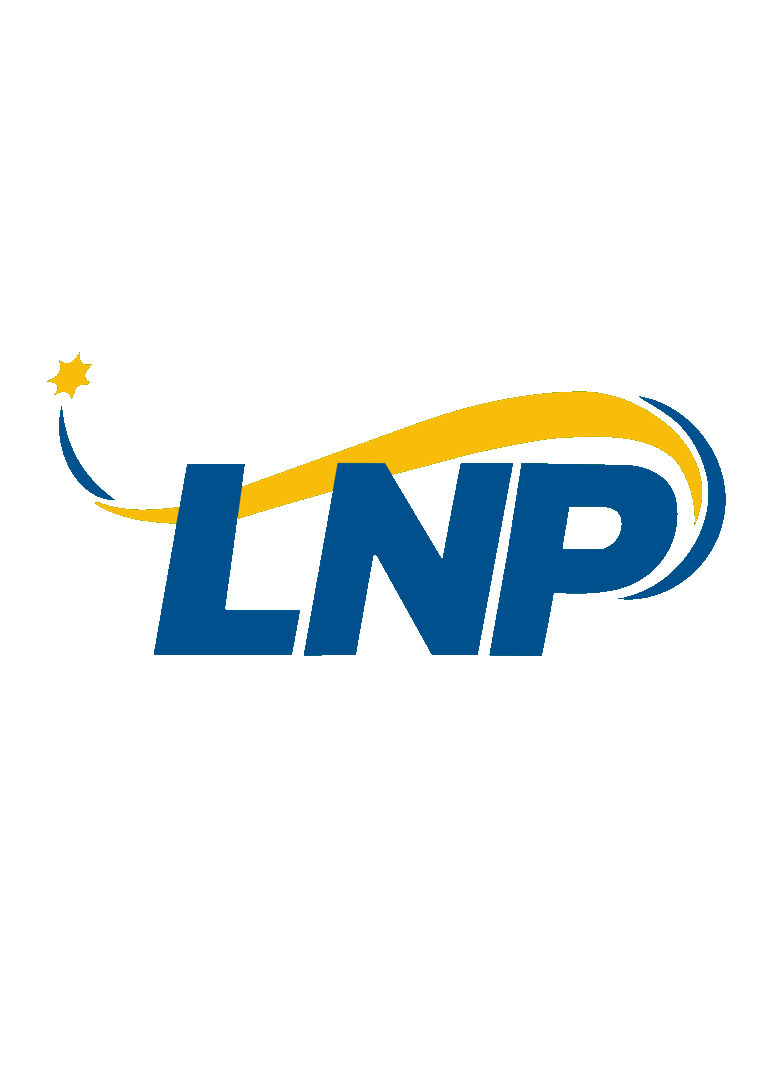
	First party	Second party
Candidate	Margie Nightingale	Trang Yen
Party	Labor	Liberal National
Primary vote	9,954	7,834
Percentage	37.3%	29.4%
Swing	▼30.1	▲12.8
TPP	56.7%	43.3%
TPP swing	▼21.5	▲21.5
- Map of boundaries
MP before election
Annastacia Palaszczuk
Labor
Elected MP
Margie Nightingale
Labor

A by-election for the electoral district of Inala in the Legislative Assembly of Queensland was held on 16 March 2024 following the resignation of former Queensland Premier Annastacia Palaszczuk from parliament, which was announced on 10 December 2023 and took effect on 31 December 2023. The by-election was held on the same day as the Ipswich West by-election and the statewide local government elections.

== Background ==
=== Seat details ===
The electoral district of Inala was established in 1990 following one vote one value electoral reforms by Wayne Goss and was contested for the first time at the 1992 Queensland state election. Throughout its existence, Inala has been a stronghold for the Queensland Labor Party. The seat was initially held by Henry Palaszczuk, who had transferred from Archerfield, and he served as Inala's Member of Parliament until the 2006 Queensland state election, where he was succeeded by his daughter Annastacia Palaszczuk.

Inala has consistently been a safe seat for Labor, often the safest for the party in the state. In the 2012 Queensland state election Inala was one of only 7 seats retained by Labor. Palaszczuk experienced a significant decline in her primary vote and a 14% swing against her in the Two-party-preferred vote, this being the first time since the seat's establishment where Labor did not obtain a majority in the primary vote. Her margin of victory was reduced to 6.2%. Palaszczuk was subsequently appointed as Labor leader and led the party back to government in the 2015 Queensland state election.

Under the Palaszczuk government, Inala reverted to its traditional status as a comfortably safe Labor seat. Palaszczuk was re-elected in Inala in 2015 with an increased majority of 25%, making it the second-safest seat in the state. Her lead was increased in the 2017 and 2020 elections to 26.1% and 28.1% respectively.

=== Demographics ===
Inala is located in the southwestern suburbs of Brisbane. According to the 2021 Australian Census, the electorate has a median age of 34, which is lower than both the state and national averages. 18.8% of the electorate hold a Bachelor's degree, which is lower than the state and national averages. The average personal weekly income is $659.

The electorate has a racially diverse demographic, including a significant percentage of Vietnamese Australians. Approximately 15.6 percent of households speak the Vietnamese language, and 14.4 percent of residents identify as having Vietnamese ancestry.

== Previous results ==
Two-party-preferred vote in Inala, 1992–2020
Election	1992	1995	1998	2001	2004	2006	2009	2012	2015	2017	2020
Labor	76.40%	68.90%	77.40%	71.50%	81.00%	76.30%	71.50%	56.90%	75.12%	76.10%	78.17%
Liberal/LNP	23.60%	31.10%	22.60%	—N/a	19.00%	23.70%	28.50%	43.10%	24.88%	23.90%	21.83%
Independent	—N/a	—N/a	—N/a	28.50%	—N/a	—N/a	—N/a	—N/a	—N/a	—N/a	
Government	ALP	ALP	ALP	ALP	ALP	ALP	ALP	LNP	ALP	ALP	ALP

2020 Queensland state election: Inala
Party	Candidate	Votes	%	±%
Labor	Annastacia Palaszczuk	19,888	67.42	−0.54
Liberal National	Miljenka Perovic	4,879	16.54	−4.15
Greens	Peter Murphy	2,275	7.71	−3.63
One Nation	Scott Reid	1,341	4.55	+4.55
Legalise Cannabis	Nigel Quinlan	734	2.49	+2.49
Independent	Terry Jones	197	0.67	+0.67
Civil Liberties & Motorists	Michael Vidal	183	0.62	+0.62
Total formal votes		29,497	95.10	+2.25
Informal votes		1,521	4.90	−2.25
Turnout		31,018	86.85	+0.27
Two-party-preferred result
Labor	Annastacia Palaszczuk	23,057	78.17	+2.07
Liberal National	Miljenka Perovic	6,440	21.83	−2.07
Labor hold		Swing	+2.07	

== Candidates ==
Party	Candidate	Notes
Independent	Linh Nguyen	
Independent Democrats	Chris Simpson	Project manager and tradesman; former member of Master Builders Queensland
Independent Progressive	Edward Carroll	State leader of the unregistered Queensland Progressives; also endorsed by the Fusion Party
Legalise Cannabis	Nigel Quinlan	Candidate for Inala in 2004 for the Greens and 2020
Liberal National	Trang Yen	Acting chief financial officer of Trade Investment Queensland; former government bureaucrat
Independent	Nayda Hernandez	
Greens	Navdeep Singh Sidhu	
Labor	Margie Nightingale	Former teacher and policy advisor to Deputy Premier, Treasurer and Minister for Trade and Investment Cameron Dick

=== Labor ===
William Bowe from the Poll Bludger and the "Feeding the Chooks" column in The Australian, suggested Jon Persley, Annastacia Palaszczuk's deputy chief of staff, as a potential successor candidate for the 2024 Inala state by-election. However, concerns arose about representation due to the multicultural demographics of the electorate, a point highlighted by The Australian. In January 2024, Persley told The Australian that he would not be contesting for preselection due to Labor's gender quota rules being a 'big factor'. Margie Nightingale, a former teacher and current policy adviser to Treasurer Cameron Dick, won the preselection instead and was elected as the new MP for Inala at the by-election.

== Results ==
2024 Inala state by-election
Party	Candidate	Votes	%	±%
Labor	Margie Nightingale	10,216	37.23	−30.19
Liberal National	Trang Yen	8,059	29.37	+12.83
Greens	Navdeep Singh Sidhu	2,790	10.17	+2.46
Independent	Linh Nguyen	2,502	9.12	+9.12
Independent	Nayda Hernandez	1,320	4.81	+4.81
Legalise Cannabis	Nigel Quinlan	1,046	3.81	+1.32
Independent Democrat	Chris Simpson	986	3.60	+3.60
Independent Progressives	Edward Carroll	519	1.89	+1.89
Total formal votes		27,438	91.26	−3.84
Informal votes		2,627	8.74	+3.84
Turnout		30,065	77.35	−9.50
Two-party-preferred result
Labor	Margie Nightingale	15,544	56.65	−21.52
Liberal National	Trang Yen	11,894	43.35	+21.52
Labor hold		Swing	−21.52	

== See also ==
- 2023 Queensland Labor Party leadership election
