= Amy MacMahon =

Australian politician and sociologist

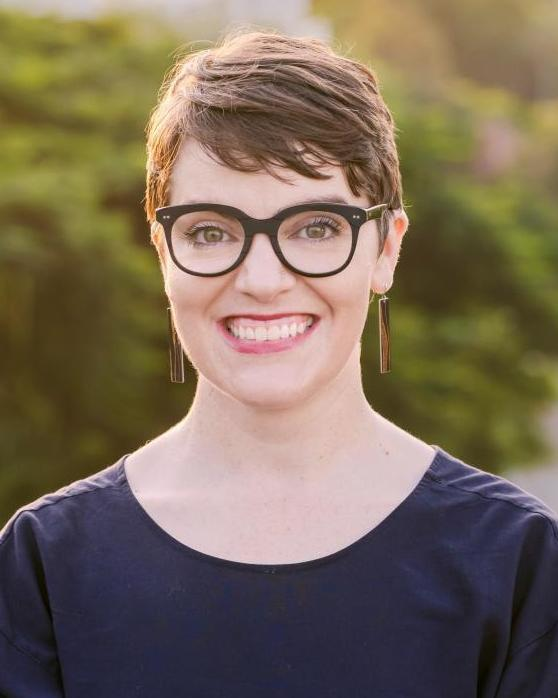

Member of the Queensland Parliament for South Brisbane
- In office 31 October 2020 – 26 October 2024
- Preceded by: Jackie Trad
- Succeeded by: Barbara O'Shea

Personal details
- Born: 7 June 1986 (age 40)
- Party: Queensland Greens
- Education: University of Queensland (PhD)
- Occupation: Sociologist; University lecturer; English teacher
- Website: www.amymacmahon.com

Amy MacMahon (born 7 June 1986) is an Australian politician and sociologist. She was a member of the Legislative Assembly of Queensland representing South Brisbane for the Queensland Greens. She has a PhD in sociology and worked as a teacher and lecturer before entering politics.

At the 2020 state election, MacMahon won the seat of South Brisbane from Labor's Jackie Trad, becoming the second Greens member in parliament alongside Michael Berkman.

== Early life and career ==
MacMahon went to Brisbane State High School. In 2011, MacMahon spent 12 months in Bangladesh completing some community work. She holds a Bachelor of Arts and Bachelor of Social Science, as well as a Doctorate of Philosophy from the University of Queensland. The thesis for her PhD investigated climate change adaptation in Bangladesh.

MacMahon worked as an English teacher, and a sociology lecturer at the University of Queensland. She also worked with Ipswich City Council on community engagement.

== Political career ==
MacMahon contested against Labor's deputy premier Jackie Trad in South Brisbane during the 2017 Queensland state election, achieving 34.4 per cent of primary votes and 46.4 per cent after preferences.

At the 2020 state election, MacMahon defeated Trad for the seat of South Brisbane, achieving 37.9 per cent of the primary vote, overtaking Trad on 34.4 per cent. MacMahon received a two-candidate-preferred vote of 55.3 per cent once preferences had been delivered. This followed a decision by the LNP to recommend Labor be preferenced last in South Brisbane. She became the second Greens member currently in the state parliament, with Michael Berkman in the seat of Maiwar.

In 2024, MacMahon opposed the development of 14,000 high density homes near the Cross River Rail Station in Woolloongabba, 20% of which would be set aside for affordable housing. MacMahon argued that 20% was too low, that there was inadequate infrastructure in the area, the process was "extremely undemocratic" and that developers would profit. She argued that building more housing does not necessarily reduce the cost of housing, stating that, "[e]ven in areas where you've gotten this big influx of supply it hasn't actually brought down the cost of housing."

In the 2024 Queensland state election, she lost her seat to Labor candidate Barbara O'Shea.

=== Electoral history ===
Queensland Legislative Assembly
| Election year | Electorate | Party | Votes | FP% | +/- | 2PP% | +/- | Result |
|---|---|---|---|---|---|---|---|---|
| 2017 | South Brisbane | GRN | 9,549 | 34.40 | ▲11.70 | 46.50 | ▲46.50 | Second |
| 2020 | South Brisbane | GRN | 12,631 | 37.89 | ▲3.54 | 55.35 | ▲8.90 | First |
| 2024 | South Brisbane | GRN | 12,146 | 34.71 | ▼3.19 | 43.95 | ▼11.40 | Second |

== Personal life ==
MacMahon lives in Kangaroo Point. On 12 February 2024, MacMahon was involved in a serious car crash in Kangaroo Point, suffering head and suspected spinal injuries.

Parliament of Queensland
| Preceded by Jackie Trad | Member for South Brisbane; 2020–2024 | Succeeded by Barbara O'Shea |
