= Margie Nightingale =

Australian politician

Margie Nightingale MP
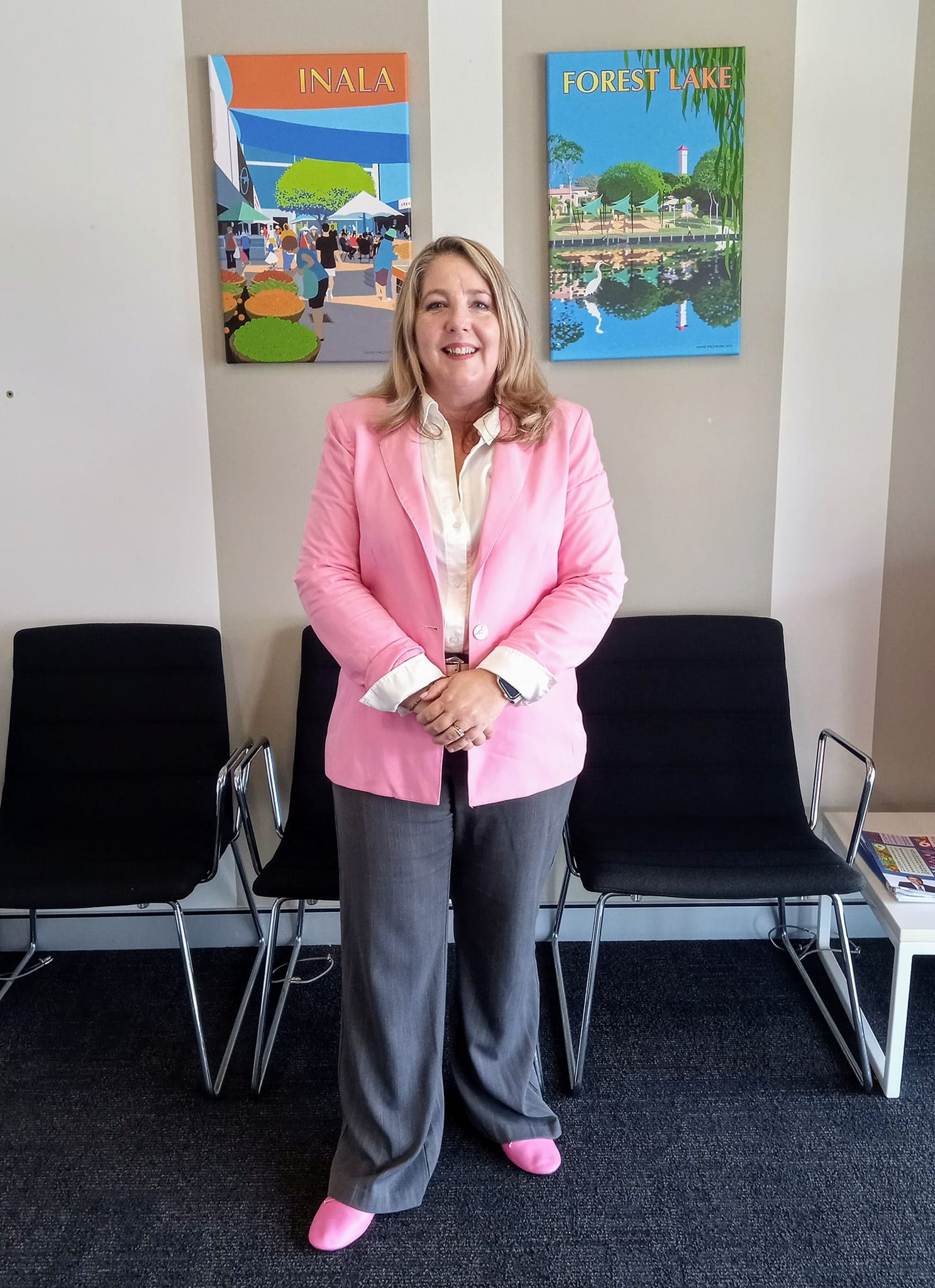
- Nightingale in 2024

Member of the Queensland Legislative Assembly for Inala
- Incumbent
- Assumed office 16 March 2024
- Preceded by: Annastacia Palaszczuk

Personal details
- Born: May 28, 1972 (age 54) Brisbane, Queensland, Australia
- Party: Labor
- Profession: Nurse, teacher, politician
- Website: Margie Nightingale

Margaret Ellen Nightingale (born 28 May 1972) is an Australian politician who has been the Labor Party member for Inala in the Legislative Assembly of Queensland since the 2024 Inala state by-election.

== Early life ==
Nightingale was born at the Royal Brisbane and Women's Hospital in Brisbane, Queensland, Australia in 1972. She grew up in suburban Inala, attended school locally and raised her family in that community.

== Career ==
Before being elected, Nightingale was a nurse and a teacher. She was also a policy adviser to Queensland treasurer Cameron Dick.

Nightingale was elected in the 2024 Inala state by-election, to succeed former premier Annastacia Palaszczuk.

Nightingale was re-elected in the 2024 Queensland state election.

Parliament of Queensland
Preceded by Annastacia Palaszczuk	Member for Inala; 2024–present	Incumbent
