= Wendy Bourne =

Australian politician

Wendy Bourne MP

Member of the Queensland Legislative Assembly for Ipswich West
- Incumbent
- Assumed office 26 October 2024
- Preceded by: Darren Zanow

Personal details
- Party: Labor

Wendy Bourne is an Australian Labor politician. She was elected member of the Legislative Assembly of Queensland for Ipswich West in the 2024 Queensland state election. Earlier in the year she was a candidate in the 2024 Ipswich West state by-election.

Parliament of Queensland
Preceded by Darren Zanow	Member for Ipswich West; 2024–present	Incumbent
