= Barbara O'Shea =

Australian politician

Dr Barbara O'Shea MP

Member of the Queensland Legislative Assembly for South Brisbane
- Incumbent
- Assumed office 26 October 2024
- Preceded by: Amy MacMahon

Personal details
- Born: 13 March 1963 (age 63)
- Party: Labor
- Children: 3
- Education: University of Edinburgh
- Profession: Physician

Barbara O'Shea (born 13 March 1963) is an Irish-Australian politician and doctor. She was elected member of the Legislative Assembly of Queensland for South Brisbane representing the Labor party in the 2024 Queensland state election.

Prior to entering politics, O'Shea practiced as a doctor specialising in emergency medicine and mental health at the PA Hospital in Woolloongabba in addition to working with current & recovering heroin addicts across Brisbane's southside and further advocated & pursued continued and expanded access to harm-reduction services. O'Shea and her husband also own and operate a small business.

== Early life ==
O'Shea grew up in public housing during her formative years, which she credits with allowing her to achieve a good education through the life-stability provided.

== Political career ==
After being preselected as the Labor candidate for South Brisbane, O'Shea received the endorsement of EMILY's List Australia, an organisation which supports Labor women.

At the 2024 election, O'Shea won the seat of South Brisbane from incumbent Greens member, Amy MacMahon. O'Shea finished second on the primary vote, however after the distribution of preferences, she defeated MacMahon. This followed a decision by the Liberals to preference Labor ahead of the Greens in South Brisbane.

== Personal life ==
O'Shea is a mother of three children. O'Shea and her husband currently reside in the suburb of South Brisbane. The two met decades earlier living as housemates in West End.
