= Electoral results for the district of Callide =

Queensland, Australia, district election results

This is a list of electoral results for the electoral district of Callide in Queensland state elections.

== Members for Callide ==
Member	Party	Term
Vince Jones	Country	1950–1971
Lindsay Hartwig	Country	1972–1974
Lindsay Hartwig	National	1974–1981
Lindsay Hartwig	Independent	1981–1986
Di McCauley	National	1986–1998
Jeff Seeney	National	1998–2008
Jeff Seeney	Liberal National	2008–2017
Colin Boyce	Liberal National	2017–2022
Bryson Head	Liberal National	2022–present

== Election results ==
=== Elections in the 2020s ===
2024 Queensland state election: Callide
Party	Candidate	Votes	%	±%
Liberal National	Bryson Head	17,917	56.88	−0.32
Labor	Samantha Dendle	5,611	17.81	−7.90
One Nation	Chris O'Callaghan	4,978	15.80	+15.80
Greens	Matthew Passant	1,279	4.06	+0.11
Family First	John Whittle	912	2.90	+2.90
Independent	Duncan Scott	804	2.55	+2.55
Total formal votes		31,501	96.49	−0.55
Informal votes		1,147	3.51	+0.55
Turnout		32,648	89.49	+1.25
Two-party-preferred result
Liberal National	Bryson Head	23,053	73.18	+7.35
Labor	Samantha Dendle	8,448	26.82	−7.35
Liberal National hold		Swing	+7.35	

2022 Callide state by-election
Party	Candidate	Votes	%	±%
Liberal National	Bryson Head	13,059	50.33	−6.87
Labor	Bronwyn Dendle	5,020	19.35	−6.35
One Nation	Sharon Lohse	3,704	14.28	+14.28
Katter's Australian	Adam Burling	2,517	9.70	+1.29 (Note: Counted from Burling's vote share as an independent candidate in 2020.)
Legalise Cannabis	Fabrice Jarry	1,223	4.71	+4.71
Animal Justice	Paula Gilbard	424	1.63	+1.63
Total formal votes		25,947	98.11	+1.08
Informal votes		500	1.89	−1.08
Turnout		26,127	75.81	−14.27
Two-party-preferred result
Liberal National	Bryson Head	18,611	71.73	+5.90
Labor	Bronwyn Dendle	7,336	28.27	−5.90
Liberal National hold		Swing	+5.90	

2020 Queensland state election: Callide
Party	Candidate	Votes	%	±%
Liberal National	Colin Boyce	16,608	57.20	+23.77
Labor	Gordon Earnshaw	7,463	25.71	+3.55
Independent	Adam Burling	2,444	8.42	+8.42
Independent	Loris Doessel	1,371	4.72	+4.72
Greens	Anthony Walsh	1,147	3.95	+0.54
Total formal votes		29,033	97.04	+0.67
Informal votes		887	2.96	−0.67
Turnout		29,920	88.24	−1.19
Two-party-preferred result
Liberal National	Colin Boyce	19,112	65.83	+9.71
Labor	Gordon Earnshaw	9,921	34.17	+34.17
Liberal National hold				

=== Elections in the 2010s ===
2017 Queensland state election: Callide
Party	Candidate	Votes	%	±%
Liberal National	Colin Boyce	9,663	33.4	−11.5
One Nation	Sharon Lohse	7,408	25.6	+25.6
Labor	Darren Blackwood	6,404	22.2	−1.4
Katter's Australian	Robbie Radel	3,761	13.0	+13.0
Greens	Jaiben Baker	987	3.4	+0.5
Independent	Sandra Anderson	682	2.4	+2.4
Total formal votes		28,905	96.4	−1.8
Informal votes		1,089	3.6	+1.8
Turnout		29,994	89.4	−1.8
Two-candidate-preferred result
Liberal National	Colin Boyce	16,220	56.1	−3.7
One Nation	Sharon Lohse	12,685	43.9	+43.9
Liberal National hold		Swing	−3.7	

2015 Queensland state election: Callide
Party	Candidate	Votes	%	±%
Liberal National	Jeff Seeney	12,815	46.50	−6.83
Palmer United	John Bjelke-Petersen	6,944	25.20	+25.20
Labor	Graeme Martin	5,312	19.28	+4.52
Greens	Erich Schulz	848	3.08	−0.17
Independent	Steve Ensby	718	2.61	+2.61
Independent	Michael Higginson	538	1.95	+1.95
Independent	Duncan Scott	384	1.39	−0.67
Total formal votes		27,559	98.40	−0.07
Informal votes		449	1.60	+0.07
Turnout		28,008	91.98	−0.34
Two-candidate-preferred result
Liberal National	Jeff Seeney	13,444	56.67	−6.84
Palmer United	John Bjelke-Petersen	10,280	43.33	+43.33
Liberal National hold		Swing	−6.84	

2012 Queensland state election: Callide
Party	Candidate	Votes	%	±%
Liberal National	Jeff Seeney	14,666	53.33	−5.65
Katter's Australian	Steve Ensby	7,318	26.61	+26.61
Labor	Melissa Newton	4,058	14.76	−9.16
Greens	Camilla Percy	892	3.24	−0.59
Independent	Duncan Scott	567	2.06	+2.06
Total formal votes		27,501	98.46	−0.13
Informal votes		397	1.54	+0.13
Turnout		27,501	92.32	−0.57
Two-candidate-preferred result
Liberal National	Jeff Seeney	15,224	63.51	−5.85
Katter's Australian	Steve Ensby	8,747	36.49	+36.49
Liberal National hold		Swing	−5.85	

=== Elections in the 2000s ===
2009 Queensland state election: Callide
Party	Candidate	Votes	%	±%
Liberal National	Jeff Seeney	16,365	59.0	−11.2
Labor	David Pullen	6,636	23.9	−5.6
Independent	Clare Mildren	3,680	13.3	+13.3
Greens	Camilla Percy	1,064	3.8	+3.8
Total formal votes		27,745	98.5	
Informal votes		397	1.5	
Turnout		28,142	92.9	
Two-party-preferred result
Liberal National	Jeff Seeney	17,537	69.4	−1.0
Labor	David Pullen	7,746	30.6	+1.0
Liberal National hold		Swing	−1.0	

2006 Queensland state election: Callide
Party	Candidate	Votes	%	±%
National	Jeff Seeney	17,022	72.3	+11.9
Labor	Mikey Oliver	6,527	27.7	+5.9
Total formal votes		23,549	97.5	−0.8
Informal votes		597	2.5	+0.8
Turnout		24,146	92.0	−1.6
National hold		Swing	−1.3	

2004 Queensland state election: Callide
Party	Candidate	Votes	%	±%
National	Jeff Seeney	14,458	60.4	+20.3
Labor	David Pullen	5,216	21.8	−2.0
One Nation	Jim Dwyer	4,264	17.8	−18.3
Total formal votes		23,938	98.3	−0.0
Informal votes		405	1.7	+0.0
Turnout		24,343	93.6	−0.3
Two-party-preferred result
National	Jeff Seeney	16,223	73.6	+21.3
Labor	David Pullen	5,820	26.4	+26.4
National hold		Swing	+21.3	

2001 Queensland state election: Callide
Party	Candidate	Votes	%	±%
National	Jeff Seeney	9,598	40.1	+4.8
One Nation	Jim Dwyer	8,648	36.1	−3.7
Labor	Peter Allen	5,694	23.8	+5.1
Total formal votes		23,940	98.3	
Informal votes		424	1.7	
Turnout		24,364	93.9	
Two-candidate-preferred result
National	Jeff Seeney	10,265	52.3	+2.8
One Nation	Jim Dwyer	9,355	47.7	−2.8
National hold		Swing	+2.8	

=== Elections in the 1990s ===
1998 Queensland state election: Callide
Party	Candidate	Votes	%	±%
National	Jeff Seeney	6,597	37.7	−36.7
One Nation	Chris Savage	6,566	37.5	+37.5
Labor	Gary Barton	3,335	19.0	−1.7
Australia First	Dolores Fowler	1,013	5.8	+5.8
Total formal votes		17,511	99.0	+0.1
Informal votes		175	1.0	−0.1
Turnout		17,686	95.2	+0.3
Two-candidate-preferred result
National	Jeff Seeney	8,432	52.3	−25.5
One Nation	Chris Savage	7,696	47.7	+47.7
National hold		Swing	−25.5	

1995 Queensland state election: Callide
Party	Candidate	Votes	%	±%
National	Di McCauley	13,213	74.4	+8.7
Labor	Katrina McGill	3,693	20.8	+20.8
Confederate Action	Anthony May	858	4.8	−11.2
Total formal votes		17,764	98.9	+0.9
Informal votes		193	1.1	−0.9
Turnout		17,957	94.9	
Two-party-preferred result
National	Di McCauley	13,706	77.7	+1.8
Labor	Katrina McGill	3,925	22.3	+22.3
National hold		Swing	+1.8	

1992 Queensland state election: Callide
Party	Candidate	Votes	%	±%
National	Di McCauley	11,927	65.6	+7.0
Independent	Tom Knight	3,340	18.4	+18.4
Confederate Action	Anthony May	2,904	16.0	+16.0
Total formal votes		18,171	98.1	
Informal votes		359	1.9	
Turnout		18,530	93.8	
Two-candidate-preferred result
National	Di McCauley	13,150	75.9	+8.9
Independent	Tom Knight	4,172	24.1	+24.1
National hold		Swing	+8.9	

=== Elections in the 1980s ===
1989 Queensland state election: Callide
Party	Candidate	Votes	%	±%
National	Di McCauley	7,365	54.3	+4.4
Labor	Greg Clair	6,201	45.7	+16.7
Total formal votes		13,566	97.0	−1.5
Informal votes		421	3.0	+1.5
Turnout		13,987	92.0	+0.4
National hold		Swing	−8.9	

1986 Queensland state election: Callide
Party	Candidate	Votes	%	±%
National	Di McCauley	5,950	49.9	+10.6
Labor	Nick Kofoed	3,462	29.0	+3.7
Independent	Barry James	1,496	12.6	+12.6
Liberal	Geoffrey Clarke	1,013	8.5	+8.5
Total formal votes		11,921	98.5	−0.6
Informal votes		185	1.5	+0.6
Turnout		12,106	91.6	−1.0
Two-party-preferred result
National	Di McCauley	7,534	63.2	+22.5
Labor	Nick Kofoed	4,387	36.8	+36.8
National gain from Independent		Swing	+22.5	

1983 Queensland state election: Callide
Party	Candidate	Votes	%	±%
National	Alan Stevenson	5,817	39.3	−26.5
Independent	Lindsay Hartwig	5,249	35.4	+35.4
Labor	Alan Morris	3,746	25.3	−8.9
Total formal votes		14,812	99.1	+0.7
Informal votes		135	0.9	−0.7
Turnout		14,947	92.6	+1.5
Two-candidate-preferred result
Independent	Lindsay Hartwig	8,785	59.3	+59.3
National	Alan Stevenson	6,027	40.7	−25.1
Independent gain from National		Swing	N/A	

1980 Queensland state election: Callide
Party	Candidate	Votes	%	±%
National	Lindsay Hartwig	8,252	65.8	+0.5
Labor	Alan Morris	4,293	34.2	−0.5
Total formal votes		12,545	98.4	−0.3
Informal votes		203	1.6	+0.3
Turnout		12,748	91.1	−0.7
National hold		Swing	+0.5	

=== Elections in the 1970s ===
1977 Queensland state election: Callide
Party	Candidate	Votes	%	±%
National	Lindsay Hartwig	7,383	65.3	−2.4
Labor	John O'Sullivan	3,928	34.7	+6.2
Total formal votes		11,311	98.7	
Informal votes		149	1.3	
Turnout		11,460	91.8	
National hold		Swing	−5.5	

1974 Queensland state election: Callide
Party	Candidate	Votes	%	±%
National	Lindsay Hartwig	7,243	67.7	+17.4
Labor	Mabel Edmund	1,957	18.3	+18.3
Labor	Wilfred Mutton	1,096	10.2	+10.2
Queensland Labor	Lindsay Sharpe	407	3.8	−8.2
Total formal votes		10,703	98.3	−0.3
Informal votes		181	1.7	+0.3
Turnout		10,884	91.0	−2.9
Two-party-preferred result
National	Lindsay Hartwig	7,581	70.8	+10.5
Labor	Mabel Edmund	3,122	29.2	−10.5
National hold		Swing	+10.5	

1972 Queensland state election: Callide
Party	Candidate	Votes	%	±%
Country	Lindsay Hartwig	4,682	50.3	+7.1
Labor	Charles Tutt	3,511	37.7	+1.2
Queensland Labor	Edgar Lanigan	1,118	12.0	+1.9
Total formal votes		9,311	98.6	
Informal votes		135	1.4	
Turnout		9,446	93.9	
Two-party-preferred result
Country	Lindsay Hartwig	5,611	60.3	+3.5
Labor	Charles Tutt	3,700	39.7	−3.5
Country hold		Swing	+3.5	

=== Elections in the 1960s ===
1969 Queensland state election: Callide
Party	Candidate	Votes	%	±%
Country	Vincent Jones	3,830	43.2	−10.6
Labor	Charles Tutt	3,236	36.5	+3.3
Independent	Edgar Shields	904	10.2	+10.2
Queensland Labor	Edgar Lanigan	892	10.1	−2.9
Total formal votes		8,862	98.6	−0.1
Informal votes		125	1.4	+0.1
Turnout		8,987	92.0	−1.7
Two-party-preferred result
Country	Vincent Jones	5,030	56.8	−7.6
Labor	Charles Tutt	3,832	43.2	+7.6
Country hold		Swing	−7.6	

1966 Queensland state election: Callide
Party	Candidate	Votes	%	±%
Country	Vincent Jones	4,547	53.8	+8.3
Labor	Wilfred Prisgrove	2,809	33.2	+1.4
Queensland Labor	Edgar Lanigan	1,102	13.0	+7.5
Total formal votes		8,458	98.7	+0.1
Informal votes		115	1.3	−0.1
Turnout		8,573	93.7	−1.4
Two-party-preferred result
Country	Vincent Jones	5,444	64.4	+1.1
Labor	Wilfred Prisgrove	3,014	35.6	−1.1
Country hold		Swing	+1.1	

1963 Queensland state election: Callide
Party	Candidate	Votes	%	±%
Country	Vincent Jones	3,745	45.4	−16.9
Labor	Keith Coombs	2,622	31.8	−5.9
Independent	Alfred O'Rouke	1,422	17.3	+17.3
Queensland Labor	Nancy Green	451	5.5	+5.5
Total formal votes		8,240	98.6	0.0
Informal votes		119	1.4	0.0
Turnout		8,359	95.1	+2.2
Two-party-preferred result
Country	Vincent Jones	5,217	63.3	+1.0
Labor	Keith Coombs	3,023	36.7	−1.0
Country hold		Swing	+1.0	

1960 Queensland state election: Callide
Party	Candidate	Votes	%	±%
Country	Vincent Jones	4,998	62.3	
Labor	Oliver Edwards	3,022	37.7	
Total formal votes		8,020	98.6	
Informal votes		114	1.4	
Turnout		8,134	92.9	
Country hold		Swing		

=== Elections in the 1950s ===
1957 Queensland state election: Callide
Party	Candidate	Votes	%	±%
Country	Vincent Jones	unopposed		
Country hold		Swing		

1956 Queensland state election: Callide
Party	Candidate	Votes	%	±%
Country	Vincent Jones	6,396	65.1	+1.2
Labor	Eric Willis	3,435	34.9	−1.2
Total formal votes		9,831	98.8	+1.7
Informal votes		116	1.2	−1.7
Turnout		9,947	95.0	−1.9
Country hold		Swing	+1.2	

1953 Queensland state election: Callide
Party	Candidate	Votes	%	±%
Country	Vincent Jones	5,988	63.9	−1.9
Labor	Patrick Moore	3,386	36.1	+1.9
Total formal votes		9,374	97.1	0.0
Informal votes		281	2.9	0.0
Turnout		9,655	96.9	+2.2
Country hold		Swing	−1.9	

1950 Queensland state election: Callide
Party	Candidate	Votes	%	±%
Country	Vincent Jones	6,038	65.8	
Labor	Patrick Moore	3,138	34.2	
Total formal votes		9,176	97.1	
Informal votes		270	2.9	
Turnout		9,446	94.7	
Country hold		Swing		
