= Electoral results for the district of Gladstone =

This is a list of electoral results for the electoral district of Gladstone in the state elections of Queensland, Australia.

== Members for Gladstone ==
Member	Party	Term
Neil Bennett	Labor	1992–1995
Liz Cunningham	Independent	1995–2015
Glenn Butcher	Labor	2015–present

== Election results ==
=== Elections in the 2020s ===
2024 Queensland state election: Gladstone
Party	Candidate	Votes	%	±%
Labor	Glenn Butcher	14,067	44.89	−19.61
Liberal National	Steve Askew	8,076	25.77	+10.57
One Nation	Andrew Jackson	4,497	14.35	+1.55
Greens	Beau Pett	1,722	5.50	+2.00
Legalise Cannabis	Brianna Corcoran	1,403	4.48	+4.48
Independent	Murray Peterson	901	2.88	−1.12
Family First	Christopher Herring	668	2.13	+2.13
Total formal votes		31,334	95.70	−1.17
Informal votes		1,407	4.30	+1.17
Turnout		32,741	88.17	+0.22
Two-party-preferred result
Labor	Glenn Butcher	18,554	59.21	−14.29
Liberal National	Steve Askew	12,780	40.79	+14.29
Labor hold		Swing	−14.29	

2020 Queensland state election: Gladstone
Party	Candidate	Votes	%	±%
Labor	Glenn Butcher	18,429	64.40	+0.09
Liberal National	Ron Harding	4,339	15.16	+3.60
One Nation	Kevin Jorgensen	3,677	12.85	−7.57
Independent	Murray Peterson	1,162	4.06	+4.06
Greens	Emma Eastaughffe	1,011	3.53	−0.18
Total formal votes		28,618	96.87	+0.21
Informal votes		924	3.13	−0.21
Turnout		29,542	87.95	+1.52
Two-party-preferred result
Labor	Glenn Butcher	21,030	73.49	+0.20
Liberal National	Ron Harding	7,588	26.51	−0.20
Labor hold		Swing	+0.20	

=== Elections in the 2010s ===
2017 Queensland state election: Gladstone
Party	Candidate	Votes	%	±%
Labor	Glenn Butcher	17,307	64.3	+11.1
One Nation	Amy Lohse	5,497	20.4	+20.4
Liberal National	Chay Conaglen	3,113	11.6	−3.8
Greens	Peta Baker	998	3.7	−0.3
Total formal votes		26,915	96.7	−1.6
Informal votes		929	3.3	+1.6
Turnout		27,844	86.4	−3.8
Two-candidate-preferred result
Labor	Glenn Butcher	19,028	70.7	+7.7
One Nation	Amy Lohse	7,887	29.3	+29.3
Labor hold		Swing	+7.7	

2015 Queensland state election: Gladstone
Party	Candidate	Votes	%	±%
Labor	Glenn Butcher	16,512	52.42	+23.23
Independent	Craig Butler	8,981	28.51	+28.51
Liberal National	Michael Duggan	4,784	15.19	+4.33
Greens	Craig Tomsett	1,221	3.88	+1.77
Total formal votes		31,498	98.18	−0.18
Informal votes		583	1.82	+0.18
Turnout		32,081	90.67	−0.24
Two-candidate-preferred result
Labor	Glenn Butcher	17,152	61.89	+25.92
Independent	Craig Butler	10,561	38.11	+38.11
Labor gain from Independent		Swing	+25.92	

2012 Queensland state election: Gladstone
Party	Candidate	Votes	%	±%
Independent	Liz Cunningham	14,020	48.96	−5.68
Labor	Glenn Butcher	8,359	29.19	−13.45
Liberal National	Russell Schroter	3,109	10.86	+10.86
Katter's Australian	Anthony Beezley	2,545	8.89	+8.89
Greens	Andrew Blake	602	2.10	−0.62
Total formal votes		28,635	98.36	−0.31
Informal votes		477	1.64	+0.31
Turnout		29,112	90.92	−1.19
Two-candidate-preferred result
Independent	Liz Cunningham	15,890	64.03	+7.90
Labor	Glenn Butcher	8,925	35.97	−7.90
Independent hold		Swing	+7.90	

=== Elections in the 2000s ===
2009 Queensland state election: Gladstone
Party	Candidate	Votes	%	±%
Independent	Liz Cunningham	15,255	54.6	+7.2
Labor	Peter O'Sullivan	11,903	42.6	−3.8
Greens	Kirsten Neilson	760	2.7	+2.7
Total formal votes		27,918	98.5	
Informal votes		377	1.5	
Turnout		28,295	92.1	
Two-candidate-preferred result
Independent	Liz Cunningham	15,458	56.1	+4.1
Labor	Peter O'Sullivan	12,084	43.9	−4.1
Independent hold		Swing	+4.1	

2006 Queensland state election: Gladstone
Party	Candidate	Votes	%	±%
Independent	Liz Cunningham	12,215	47.4	−7.9
Labor	Chris Trevor	11,956	46.4	+9.1
National	John Todd	1,596	6.2	−1.2
Total formal votes		25,767	98.9	+0.6
Informal votes		293	1.1	−0.6
Turnout		26,060	92.4	−1.2
Two-candidate-preferred result
Independent	Liz Cunningham	13,112	52.0	−9.2
Labor	Chris Trevor	12,108	48.0	+9.2
Independent hold		Swing	−9.2	

2004 Queensland state election: Gladstone
Party	Candidate	Votes	%	±%
Independent	Liz Cunningham	14,057	55.3	+4.6
Labor	Julianne Grice	9,471	37.3	−7.8
National	John Todd	1,881	7.4	+5.1
Total formal votes		25,409	98.3	−0.5
Informal votes		426	1.7	+0.5
Turnout		25,835	93.6	−0.8
Two-candidate-preferred result
Independent	Liz Cunningham	15,248	61.2	+7.7
Labor	Julianne Grice	9,648	38.8	−7.7
Independent hold		Swing	+7.7	

2001 Queensland state election: Gladstone
Party	Candidate	Votes	%	±%
Independent	Liz Cunningham	12,336	50.7	+3.7
Labor	Jennifer Ellingsen	10,992	45.1	−2.3
National	Carl Hamann	571	2.3	−3.2
Greens	Rex Warren	450	1.8	+1.8
Total formal votes		24,349	98.8	
Informal votes		285	1.2	
Turnout		24,634	94.4	
Two-candidate-preferred result
Independent	Liz Cunningham	12,772	53.5	+2.1
Labor	Jennifer Ellingsen	11,103	46.5	−2.1
Independent hold		Swing	+2.1	

=== Elections in the 1990s ===
1998 Queensland state election: Gladstone
Party	Candidate	Votes	%	±%
Labor	Leo Zussino	10,897	47.4	+3.8
Independent	Liz Cunningham	10,812	47.0	+7.0
National	Paul Ford	1,271	5.5	−6.9
Total formal votes		22,980	98.9	+0.2
Informal votes		258	1.1	−0.2
Turnout		23,238	94.4	+1.4
Two-candidate-preferred result
Independent	Liz Cunningham	11,691	51.4	−1.7
Labor	Leo Zussino	11,071	48.6	+1.7
Independent hold		Swing	−1.7	

1995 Queensland state election: Gladstone
Party	Candidate	Votes	%	±%
Labor	Neil Bennett	9,361	43.6	−5.3
Independent	Liz Cunningham	8,598	40.1	+8.5
National	Jenny Elliot	2,659	12.4	−2.1
Greens	Cedric Williams	844	3.9	+3.9
Total formal votes		21,462	98.7	+0.6
Informal votes		288	1.3	−0.6
Turnout		21,750	93.0	
Two-candidate-preferred result
Independent	Liz Cunningham	11,138	53.1	+5.1
Labor	Neil Bennett	9,851	46.9	−5.1
Independent gain from Labor		Swing	+5.1	

1992 Queensland state election: Gladstone
Party	Candidate	Votes	%	±%
Labor	Neil Bennett	10,114	48.9	−11.5
Independent	Liz Cunningham	6,531	31.6	+31.6
National	Jenny Elliot	2,995	14.5	−12.6
Liberal	Maree Petty	1,044	5.0	+5.0
Total formal votes		20,684	98.1	
Informal votes		408	1.9	
Turnout		21,092	93.0	
Two-candidate-preferred result
Labor	Neil Bennett	10,469	52.0	−12.3
Independent	Liz Cunningham	9,668	48.0	+48.0
Labor hold		Swing	−12.3	
