= Electoral results for the Division of Flynn =

Australian division election results

This is a list of electoral results for the Division of Flynn in Australian federal elections from the division's creation in 2007 until the present.

== Members ==
Member	Party	Term
Chris Trevor	Labor	2007–2010
Ken O'Dowd	Liberal National	2010–2022
Colin Boyce	Liberal National	2022–present

== Election results ==
=== Elections in the 2020s ===
==== 2025 ====
2025 Australian federal election: Flynn
Party	Candidate	Votes	%	±%
Independent	John Anderson			
Labor	Helen Madell			
Trumpet of Patriots	Peter Zunker			
Family First	Peter Dorian			
Greens	Paul Bambrick			
People First	Lance Price			
Independent	Duncan Scott			
Liberal National	Colin Boyce			
One Nation	David Harris			
Total formal votes				
Informal votes				
Turnout				

==== 2022 ====
2022 Australian federal election: Flynn
Party	Candidate	Votes	%	±%
Liberal National	Colin Boyce	34,046	36.88	−1.01
Labor	Matt Burnett	30,948	33.53	+4.88
One Nation	Sharon Lohse	11,287	12.23	−7.37
United Australia	Tanya Wieden	6,266	6.79	+2.54
Greens	Paul Bambrick	4,007	4.34	+1.27
Independent	Duncan Scott	3,745	4.06	+2.51
Great Australian	Carla Svendsen	2,012	2.18	+2.18
Total formal votes		92,311	96.17	+1.98
Informal votes		3,672	3.83	−1.98
Turnout		95,983	88.07	−4.08
Two-party-preferred result
Liberal National	Colin Boyce	49,682	53.82	−4.84
Labor	Matt Burnett	42,629	46.18	+4.84
Liberal National hold		Swing	−4.84	

Alluvial diagram for preference flows in the seat of Flynn in the 2022 federal election. indicates at what stage the winning candidate had over 50% of the votes and was declared the winner.

=== Elections in the 2010s ===
==== 2019 ====
2019 Australian federal election: Flynn
Party	Candidate	Votes	%	±%
Liberal National	Ken O'Dowd	33,894	37.89	+0.83
Labor	Zac Beers	25,628	28.65	−4.74
One Nation	Sharon Lohse	17,531	19.60	+2.45
United Australia	Nathan Harris	3,798	4.25	+4.25
Greens	Jaiben Baker	2,744	3.07	+0.30
Conservative National	Marcus Hiesler	2,484	2.78	+2.78
Independent	Murray Peterson	1,994	2.23	+2.23
Independent	Duncan Scott	1,384	1.55	+0.56
Total formal votes		89,457	94.19	+0.38
Informal votes		5,517	5.81	−0.38
Turnout		94,974	92.15	−1.16
Two-party-preferred result
Liberal National	Ken O'Dowd	52,472	58.66	+7.62
Labor	Zac Beers	36,985	41.34	−7.62
Liberal National hold		Swing	+7.62	

==== 2016 ====
2016 Australian federal election: Flynn
Party	Candidate	Votes	%	±%
Liberal National	Ken O'Dowd	32,293	37.06	−8.96
Labor	Zac Beers	29,094	33.39	−0.05
One Nation	Phil Baker	14,948	17.15	+17.15
Katter's Australian	Richard Love	2,948	3.38	−0.75
Greens	Craig Tomsett	2,416	2.77	+0.56
Family First	Heather Barnett	2,173	2.49	+0.99
Independent	Nathan Fletcher	1,927	2.21	+2.21
Independent	Duncan Scott	864	0.99	+0.06
Independent	Jordan Puku	483	0.55	+0.55
Total formal votes		87,146	93.81	−0.95
Informal votes		5,755	6.19	+0.95
Turnout		92,901	92.29	−2.36
Two-party-preferred result
Liberal National	Ken O'Dowd	44,480	51.04	−5.49
Labor	Zac Beers	42,666	48.96	+5.49
Liberal National hold		Swing	−5.49	

==== 2013 ====
2013 Australian federal election: Flynn
Party	Candidate	Votes	%	±%
Liberal National	Ken O'Dowd	39,362	46.02	−1.02
Labor	Chris Trevor	28,598	33.44	−6.48
Palmer United	Steven Ensby	7,908	9.25	+9.25
Katter's Australian	Richard Love	3,536	4.13	+4.13
Greens	Serena Thompson	1,890	2.21	−1.75
Independent	Craig Tomsett	1,573	1.84	+1.84
Family First	Renae Moldre	1,287	1.50	−2.99
Independent	Duncan Scott	792	0.93	−2.86
Rise Up Australia	Kingsley Dickins	584	0.68	+0.68
Total formal votes		85,530	94.76	+0.09
Informal votes		4,725	5.24	−0.09
Turnout		90,255	94.64	+2.25
Two-party-preferred result
Liberal National	Ken O'Dowd	48,352	56.53	+2.95
Labor	Chris Trevor	37,178	43.47	−2.95
Liberal National hold		Swing	+2.95	

==== 2010 ====
2010 Australian federal election: Flynn
Party	Candidate	Votes	%	±%
Liberal National	Ken O'Dowd	37,584	47.04	+0.67
Labor	Chris Trevor	31,894	39.92	−6.78
Family First	Di Hancock-Mills	3,586	4.49	+2.48
Greens	Anne Goddard	3,163	3.96	+1.91
Independent	Duncan Scott	3,025	3.79	+2.88
Democratic Labor	John McMahon	640	0.80	+0.80
Total formal votes		79,892	94.67	−1.38
Informal votes		4,502	5.33	+1.38
Turnout		84,394	92.36	−2.75
Two-party-preferred result
Liberal National	Ken O'Dowd	42,806	53.58	+5.82
Labor	Chris Trevor	37,086	46.42	−5.82
Liberal National gain from Labor		Swing	+5.82	

=== Elections in the 2000s ===
==== 2007 ====
2007 Australian federal election: Flynn
Party	Candidate	Votes	%	±%
Labor	Chris Trevor	35,892	44.76	+9.18
National	Glenn Churchill	26,907	33.56	−13.34
Liberal	Jason Rose	11,850	14.78	+12.32
Family First	Matthew Drysdale	1,662	2.07	−2.39
Greens	Marella Pettinato	1,577	1.97	−0.65
Independent	Duncan Scott	807	1.01	+1.01
Independent	Phillip Costello	761	0.95	+0.95
Democrats	Julie Noble	535	0.67	−0.47
Liberty & Democracy	Jarrah Job	196	0.24	+0.24
Total formal votes		80,187	95.95	+0.26
Informal votes		3,385	4.05	−0.26
Turnout		83,572	94.99	−0.57
Two-party-preferred result
Labor	Chris Trevor	40,220	50.16	+7.88
National	Glenn Churchill	39,967	49.84	−7.88
Labor notional gain from National		Swing	+7.88	
