= Bryson Head =

Australian politician (born 1995)

Bryson Head MP

Member of the Queensland Parliament for Callide
- Incumbent
- Assumed office 18 June 2022
- Preceded by: Colin Boyce

Personal details
- Born: September 1995 Brigalow, Queensland
- Party: Liberal National Party
- Occupation: geologist

Bryson Warwick Head (born September 1995) is an Australian politician.

He has been the Liberal National Party member for Callide in the Queensland Legislative Assembly since a June 2022 by-election.

== Background ==
Head was born and raised on his family's beef and grain property, near Brigalow, Queensland. Throughout his youth, he worked by mustering, cutting rosewood fence posts and picking watermelons.

He attended the Queensland University of Technology where he studied a Bachelor of Science, majoring in earth science.

Head is a qualified geologist and has worked in coal mines throughout Queensland and New South Wales as well as the oilfields of Canada.

Head has also worked as a regional recovery support officer for the Federal Government's National Recovery and Resilience Agency, organising various events in drought and flood affected communities in Southern Queensland.

=== Green Shirts Movement ===
As a vocal opponent to the vegetation management, animal welfare and reef regulations introduced by the Palaszczuk government, Head was appointed as the national campaign manager for the Green Shirts Movement which was launched in June 2018, led by national coordinator Martin Bella.

According to Head, the movement aimed to "reclaim" the colour of green from extreme environmental groups and the "fake Greens" who had "strangled primary industry for decades".

In an editorial published in the Queensland Country Life, Head described the "genuiune grassroots movement" as enabling the rural industry to defend itself against the "onslaught of lies, mistruths and fake news spread by extreme green groups, politicians and certain sections of the media."

== Political career ==
The retirement of federal member for Flynn Ken O'Dowd prompted the sitting member for Callide Colin Boyce to vie to be O'Dowd's successor in federal parliament.

Expecting the resulting Callide by-election to be held after the 2022 Australian federal election, Head was endorsed by the LNP as their candidate in February 2022.

Head campaigned chiefly on rural health issues, criticising the reduction of health services in the electorate including the closure of maternity services in places like Theodore which was seeing an increase in roadside births. At a meeting held in Biloela about the issue of rural health services, which he attended his LNP leader David Crisafulli and shadow health minister Ros Bates, Head said he would have a "red hot crack" at fixing the issues.

His successful election as the state member for Callide saw Head become the youngest MP to serve in the 57th Legislative Assembly of Queensland.

In his speech, Head warned his fellow parliamentarians not to treat his electorate with disdain, stating that failing to do so would make "an enemy of me and my people."

Head's maiden speech was criticised by the Member for Greenslopes Joe Kelly who summarised it as: "let’s cut down the trees, let’s get rid of the Containers for Change program and if you come near anybody in my town I’m going to bash you up!"

Parliament of Queensland
Preceded by Colin Boyce	Member for Callide; 2022–present	Incumbent
