= 2022 Callide state by-election =

- 18 June 2022

Electoral district of Callide in the Queensland Legislative Assembly
- Turnout: 75.81% ▼14.27
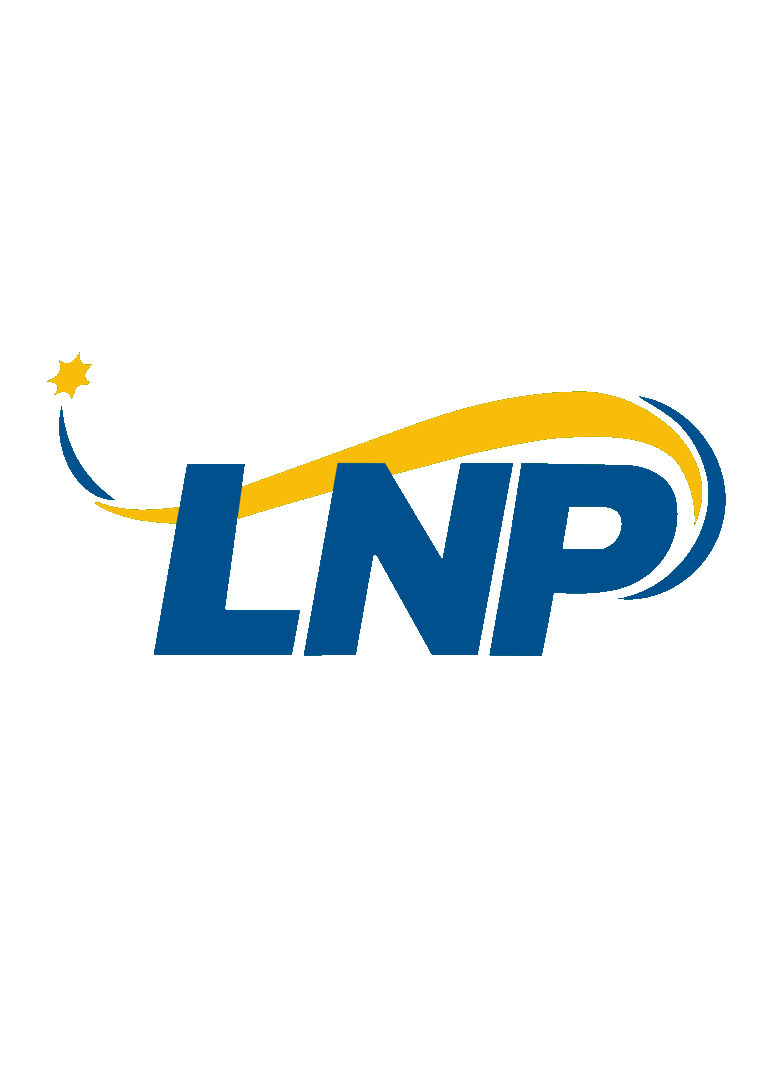

	First party	Second party	Third party
Candidate	Bryson Head	Bronwyn Dendle	Sharon Lohse
Party	Liberal National	Labor	One Nation
Primary vote	13,059	5,020	3,704
Percentage	50.33%	19.35%	14.28%
Swing	▼6.87%	▼6.35%	▲14.28%
TPP	71.73%	28.27%
TPP swing	▲5.90%	▼5.90%
MP before election
Colin Boyce
Liberal National
Elected MP
Bryson Head
Liberal National

The 2022 Callide state by-election was held on 18 June 2022 to elect the member for Callide in the Queensland Legislative Assembly, following the resignation of Liberal National Party (LNP) MP Colin Boyce. Boyce resigned from parliament to contest the federal election held on 21 May 2022.

== Background ==
=== 2020 election results ===
2020 Queensland state election: Callide
Party	Candidate	Votes	%	±%
Liberal National	Colin Boyce	16,608	57.20	+23.77
Labor	Gordon Earnshaw	7,463	25.71	+3.55
Independent	Adam Burling	2,444	8.42	+8.42
Independent	Loris Doessel	1,371	4.72	+4.72
Greens	Anthony Walsh	1,147	3.95	+0.54
Total formal votes		29,033	97.04	+0.67
Informal votes		887	2.96	−0.67
Turnout		29,920	88.24	−1.19
Two-party-preferred result
Liberal National	Colin Boyce	19,112	65.83	+9.71
Labor	Gordon Earnshaw	9,921	34.17	+34.17
Liberal National hold				

== Key dates ==
Date	Event
23 May 2022	Issue of the writ
27 May 2022	Close of electoral rolls
31 May 2022	Close of nominations
6 June 2022	Early voting begins
18 June 2022	Polling day

== Candidates ==
Candidates (in ballot paper order)
Legalise Cannabis	Fabrice Jarry	
Animal Justice	Paula Gilbard	Animal rights advocate and candidate for Longman
Katter's Australian	Adam Burling	Independent candidate at last election
One Nation	Sharon Lohse	Queensland Health employee and banker
Liberal National	Bryson Head	Fruit picker and geologist
Labor	Bronwyn Dendle	Social worker and community activist

== Results ==
2022 Callide state by-election
Party	Candidate	Votes	%	±%
Liberal National	Bryson Head	13,059	50.33	−6.87
Labor	Bronwyn Dendle	5,020	19.35	−6.35
One Nation	Sharon Lohse	3,704	14.28	+14.28
Katter's Australian	Adam Burling	2,517	9.70	+1.29 (Note: Counted from Burling's vote share as an independent candidate in 2020.)
Legalise Cannabis	Fabrice Jarry	1,223	4.71	+4.71
Animal Justice	Paula Gilbard	424	1.63	+1.63
Total formal votes		25,947	98.11	+1.08
Informal votes		500	1.89	−1.08
Turnout		26,127	75.81	−14.27
Two-party-preferred result
Liberal National	Bryson Head	18,611	71.73	+5.90
Labor	Bronwyn Dendle	7,336	28.27	−5.90
Liberal National hold		Swing	+5.90	

== See also ==
- List of Queensland state by-elections
- Politics of Queensland
