= Division of Flynn =

Australian federal electoral division

Coordinates: 24.491°S 149.664°E

Flynn Australian House of Representatives Division
- Interactive map of boundaries since the 2019 federal election
- Created: 2006
- MP: Colin Boyce
- Party: National (Note: Member of the Liberal National Party of Queensland sitting with the federal parliamentary National Party.)
- Namesake: John Flynn
- Electors: 117,940 (2025)
- Area: 132,824 km^{2} (51,283.6 sq mi)
- Demographic: Rural and provincial
Electorates around Flynn:
| Capricornia | Capricornia | Coral Sea |
| Maranoa | Flynn | Coral Sea |
| Maranoa | Maranoa | Hinkler; Wide Bay |

The Division of Flynn is an Australian electoral division in the state of Queensland. It stretches along the Pacific coast from north of Bundaberg to south of Rockhampton, comprising Gladstone.

Since 2022, Flynn has been represented by Colin Boyce of the National Party.

== Geography ==
Federal electoral division boundaries in Australia are determined at redistributions by a redistribution committee appointed by the Australian Electoral Commission (AEC). Redistributions occur for the boundaries of divisions in a particular state, and they occur every seven years, or sooner if a state's representation entitlement changes or when divisions of a state are malapportioned.

The electorate generally extends west from the port city of Gladstone, as far as the Central Highlands town of Emerald.

== History ==
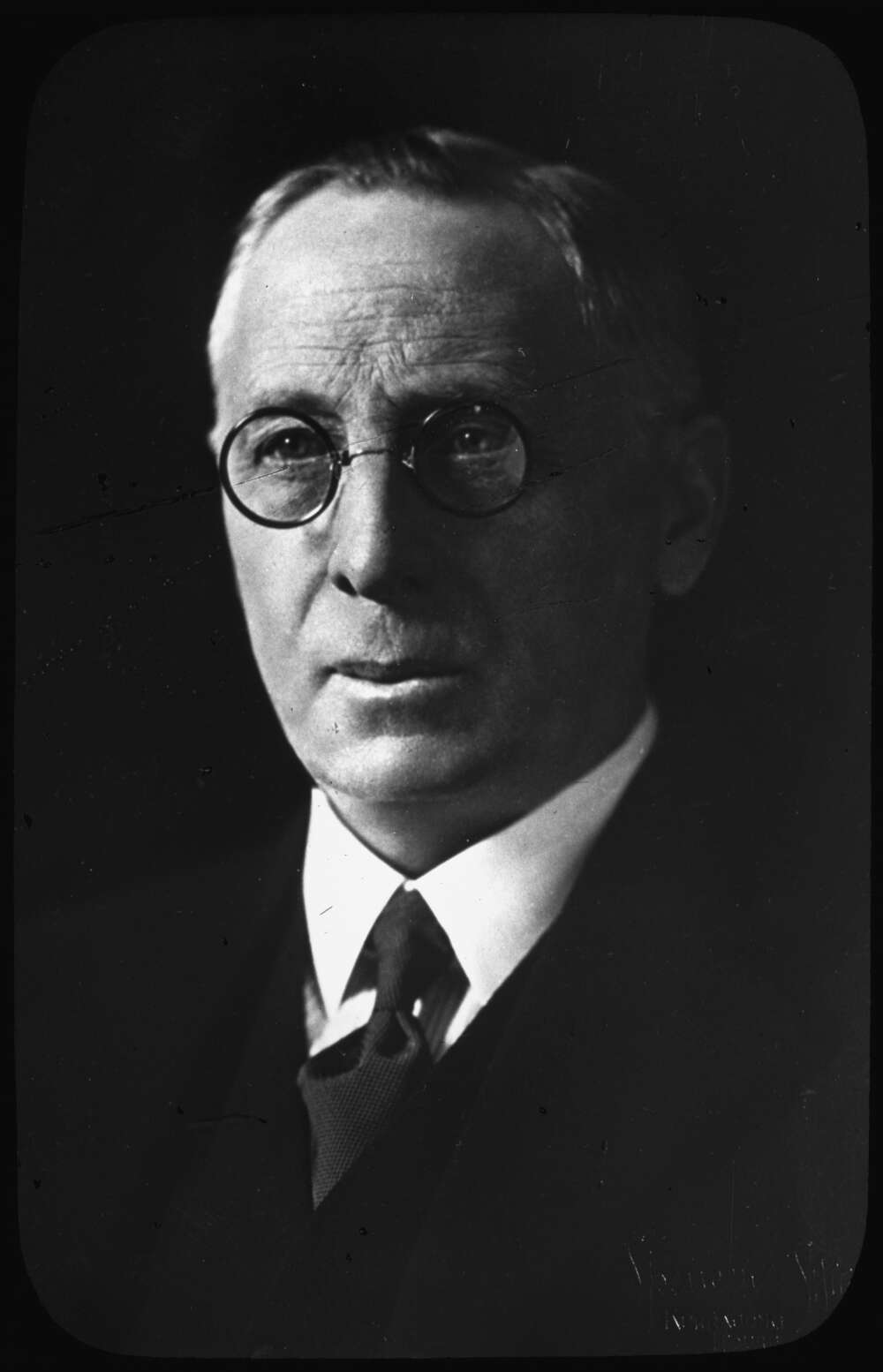
John Flynn, the division's namesake

The division was created in 2006, following a redistribution of seats in the state. It was first contested at the 2007 federal election.

It was named after John Flynn, founder of the Royal Flying Doctor Service.

== Formation ==
In June 2006, the AEC announced that the new federal electorate in Queensland to be created for the 2007 election would be named Wright in honour of Judith Wright for her life as a "poet and in the areas of arts, conservation and indigenous affairs in Queensland and Australia". However, in September 2006 the AEC announced that, due to numerous objections from people fearing the name may be linked to disgraced former Queensland ALP leader Keith Wright, it would name the seat after John Flynn.

The city of Gladstone, home to 40% of Flynn's voters, has long been a Labor stronghold. However, the rural areas vote in equally large numbers for the Liberal National Party.

== Demographics ==
Flynn is a largely blue-collar electorate. It tends to support the Liberal National Party. Its industries include a mix of mining and agriculture, as well as heavy industry around Gladstone.

Labor maintains a base of support in Gladstone and Mount Morgan, and in the Aboriginal community of Woorabinda where it recorded 71.2% in 2019. Elsewhere in the electorate, voters skew conservative and vote heavily for the Liberal National Party.

Similar voting trends can be seen in the nearby electorates of Capricornia, Dawson, and Herbert.

== Members ==
| Image | Member | Party | Term | Notes |
|---|---|---|---|---|
| | Chris Trevor (1961–) | Labor | 24 November 2007 – 21 August 2010 | Lost seat |
| | Ken O'Dowd (1950–) | National | 21 August 2010 – 11 April 2022 | Retired |
| | Colin Boyce (1962–) | National | 21 May 2022 – present | Previously held the Legislative Assembly of Queensland seat of Callide. Incumbent |

== Election results ==
2025 Australian federal election: Flynn
| Party | Candidate | Votes | % | ±% |
|---|---|---|---|---|
| Liberal National | Colin Boyce | 36,502 | 37.42 | +0.54 |
| Labor | Helen Madell | 24,441 | 25.06 | −8.47 |
| One Nation | David Harris | 13,874 | 14.22 | +1.99 |
| People First | Lance Price | 6,180 | 6.34 | +6.34 |
| Greens | Paul Bambrick | 5,547 | 5.69 | +1.35 |
| Trumpet of Patriots | Peter Zunker | 3,720 | 3.81 | +3.81 |
| Independent | John Anderson | 3,130 | 3.21 | +3.21 |
| Family First | Peter Dorian | 2,408 | 2.47 | +2.47 |
| Independent | Duncan Scott | 1,741 | 1.78 | −2.28 |
| Total formal votes | | 97,543 | 93.33 | −2.84 |
| Informal votes | | 6,970 | 6.67 | +2.84 |
| Turnout | | 104,513 | 88.64 | +0.57 |
Two-party-preferred result
| Liberal National | Colin Boyce | 58,762 | 60.24 | +6.42 |
| Labor | Helen Madell | 38,781 | 39.76 | −6.42 |
| Liberal National hold | | Swing | +6.42 | |
