= Di McCauley =

Australian politician

Member of the Queensland Legislative Assembly for Callide
- In office 1 November 1986 – 13 June 1998
- Preceded by: Lindsay Hartwig
- Succeeded by: Jeff Seeney

Personal details
- Born: 4 June 1946 (age 80) Wondai, Queensland, Australia
- Party: National Party
- Education: University of Queensland
- Occupation: Grazier

Diane Elizabeth McCauley (born 4 June 1946) is a former Australian politician.

Born at Wondai, she received a Bachelor of Arts from the University of Queensland and worked as a grazier. She was a Banana Shire Councillor from 1985 to 1990 and part-owned a cattle property from 1975. In 1986 she was elected to the Queensland Legislative Assembly as the National Party member for Callide. In 1990 she became the National Party's Spokesperson on Health, to which Women's Affairs and Local Government were added in 1991. She became Shadow Minister for Local Government in 1992 and Minister for Local Government and Planning in 1996. McCauley retired in 1998.

Parliament of Queensland
Preceded by Lindsay Hartwig	Member for Callide; 1986–1998	Succeeded by Jeff Seeney
