= Glenn Butcher (politician) =

Australian politician

The Honourable Glenn Butcher MP

Minister for Water of Queensland
- In office 19 November 2020 – 28 October 2024
- Premier: Annastacia Palaszczuk; Steven Miles
- Preceded by: New portfolio
- Succeeded by: Ann Leahy

Minister for Regional Development and Manufacturing of Queensland
- In office 11 May 2020 – 28 October 2024
- Premier: Annastacia Palaszczuk; Steven Miles
- Preceded by: Cameron Dick
- Succeeded by: Dale Last

Assistant Minister for Treasury of Queensland
- In office 11 December 2017 – 10 May 2020
- Premier: Annastacia Palaszczuk
- Preceded by: New portfolio
- Succeeded by: Position abolished

Assistant Minister for Transport and Infrastructure of Queensland
- In office 10 February 2017 – 11 December 2017
- Premier: Annastacia Palaszczuk
- Preceded by: New portfolio
- Succeeded by: Position abolished

Assistant Minister for Local Government and Infrastructure of Queensland
- In office 11 November 2016 – 10 February 2017
- Premier: Annastacia Palaszczuk
- Preceded by: Jennifer Howard
- Succeeded by: Position abolished

Member of the Queensland Legislative Assembly for Gladstone
- Incumbent
- Assumed office 31 January 2015
- Preceded by: Liz Cunningham

Personal details
- Born: 15 April 1972 (age 54) Gladstone, Queensland
- Party: Labor
- Occupation: Mechanical fitter and machinist
- Website: www.glennbutchermp.com.au

Glenn James Butcher (born 15 April 1972) is an Australian politician currently serving as the Labor member for Gladstone in the Queensland Legislative Assembly since 2015. He previously served as Queensland Minister for Regional Development and Manufacturing, as well as Minister for Water, during the Third Palaszczuk ministry and subsequent Miles ministry. Prior to this, he held various other portfolios during the First and Second Palaszczuk ministries.

== Political career ==
Butcher had contested Gladstone in 2012, losing to incumbent independent MP Liz Cunningham.

=== Member of Parliament ===
Following Cunningham's decision to retire in the lead up to the 2015 election, Gladstone was considered a notionally Labor seat. Butcher won the seat with a 23.2% primary vote swing, and a 25.9% two-party preferred swing in his favour. He actually won 52 percent of the primary vote, enough to win the seat outright, with the Liberal National candidate falling to third place. For some time, it had been a foregone conclusion that Gladstone would revert to Labor once Cunningham retired. The city of Gladstone has been a Labor stronghold for more than a century, and most calculations of "traditional" two-party matchups (Labor v. National before 2009, Labor v. LNP since 2009) during Cunningham's tenure showed it as a safe Labor seat. Indeed, Butcher would have won Gladstone in 2012 on a margin of 11 percent even in the midst of Labor's collapse that year.

Butcher consolidated his hold on Gladstone in 2017, helped by a redistribution that notionally increased his majority from 11.9% to 13%. He picked up a two-candidate swing of 10.7% at the election, this time over a One Nation candidate, with the LNP candidate falling to third place.

In May 2020 Butcher was appointed as the new Minister for Regional Development and Manufacturing in the Second Palaszczuk Ministry, and gained the portfolio of Water following the 2020 Queensland state election.

He was re-elected in 2020 with a primary vote of 64.4%, and took 73.4 percent of the two-party preferred vote, making Gladstone Labor's safest seat outside Brisbane and the third safest Labor seat in the chamber.

== See also ==
- First Palaszczuk Ministry
- Second Palaszczuk Ministry
- Third Palaszczuk Ministry

Parliament of Queensland
Preceded by Liz Cunningham	Member for Gladstone; 2015–present	Incumbent
Political offices
Preceded by Jennifer Howard	Assistant Minister for Local Government and Infrastructure; 2016–2017	Abolished
New title	Assistant Minister for Transport and Infrastructure; 2017	Abolished
New title	Assistant Minister for Treasury; 2017–2020	Abolished
Preceded by Cameron Dick (Manufacturing)	Minister for Regional Development and Manufacturing; 2020–2024	Succeeded by Dale Last
New title	Minister for Water; 2020–2024	Succeeded by Ann Leahy
