= Neil Bennett (politician) =

Australian politician

Member of the Queensland Legislative Assembly for Gladstone
- In office 19 September 1992 – 15 July 1995
- Preceded by: New seat
- Succeeded by: Liz Cunningham

Personal details
- Born: Neil Patrick Bennett; 28 February 1958 (age 68) Bundaberg, Queensland, Australia
- Party: Labor
- Occupation: Electrical mechanic

Neil Patrick Bennett (born 28 February 1958) is a former Australian politician.

He was born in Bundaberg and worked as an electrical fitter, mechanic and power station operator before entering politics. A member of the Labor Party, he served as secretary and treasurer of the party's Gladstone branch. In 1992 he was elected to the Queensland Legislative Assembly as the member for Gladstone. He served until 1995, when he was defeated by independent candidate Liz Cunningham.

Parliament of Queensland
New seat	Member for Gladstone; 1992–1995	Succeeded by Liz Cunningham
