= Lindsay Hartwig =

Australian politician

Lindsay Hartwig JP

Member of the Queensland Legislative Assembly for Callide
- In office 27 May 1972 – 1 November 1986
- Preceded by: Vincent Jones
- Succeeded by: Di McCauley

Personal details
- Born: Lindsay Earle Hartwig; 29 December 1919 Eidsvold, Queensland, Australia
- Died: 2 April 1996 (aged 76) Darling Downs, Queensland, Australia
- Resting place: Garden of Remembrance Cemetery, Toowoomba
- Party: Independent (after 1981)
- Other political affiliations: National (before 1981); Liberal (late 1980s); Citizens Electoral Council (1988)
- Spouse: Estelle Mary Carmody (m.1946)
- Occupation: Grazier

Lindsay Earle Hartwig (29 December 1919 – 2 April 1996) was a politician in Queensland, Australia. He was a Member of the Queensland Legislative Assembly.

== Early life ==
Hartwig was a farmer and grazier by occupation and pioneered the first aerial sowing of pasture seed.

== Politics ==
Hartwig began his political career as a councillor with the Shire of Monto (1961–1970) and was appointed chairman in 1964.

In 1972, he was preselected for the safe National Party seat of Callide. He was elected at the 1972 election, winning re-election as a National in 1974, 1977 and 1980. In 1981, Hartwig was expelled from the National Party caucus by a vote of 33 to 2 by the party executive for repeated criticism of party president Sir Robert Sparkes. He won re-election as an independent in 1983, but retired at the 1986 election. During his time as an independent, he was elected as the Chairman of the Livingstone Shire Council in a landslide. However, he only served about 11 months as chairman because of continual concerns about his ability to be effective as a shire chairman given his parliamentary duties.

Hartwig was never appointed to state Cabinet but had a notable achievement in fighting successfully to have Queensland Day officially recognised. He also adopted a unique radio campaign. He put together a race-call commercial and called himself "Lovable Lindsay" who always won by a nose.

After leaving parliament, he became involved with the Liberal Party for a time and contested the 1988 South-Coast by-election for the Citizens Electoral Council.

== Later life ==
Upon his death in 1996, his former colleagues made a range of tribute speeches; the stories of Hartwig's career were frequently humorous. Hartwig is buried in Toowoomba's Garden of Remembrance Cemetery.

Parliament of Queensland
Preceded by Vincent Jones	Member for Callide; 1972–1986	Succeeded by Di McCauley
