= Vince Jones (politician) =

Australian politician

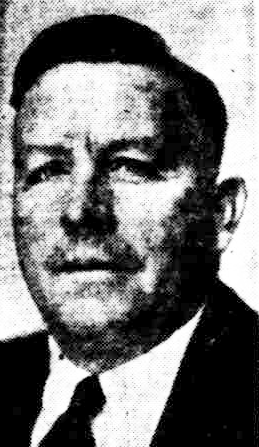
- Vince Jones, 1950

Member of the Queensland Legislative Assembly for Callide
- In office 29 Apr 1950 – 30 October 1971
- Preceded by: New seat
- Succeeded by: Lindsay Hartwig

Personal details
- Born: Vincent Edward Jones; 15 June 1910 Barcaldine, Queensland, Australia
- Died: 30 October 1971 (aged 61) Yeppoon, Queensland, Australia
- Resting place: North Rockhampton Cemetery
- Party: Country Party
- Spouse: Doris Elsie McNamara (m.1936)
- Occupation: Dairy farmer

Vincent Edward Jones (15 June 1910 – 30 October 1971) was a member of the Queensland Legislative Assembly in Australia.

== Biography ==
Jones was born in Barcaldine, Queensland, the son of Frank Harold Jones and his wife Kathleen Clarke (née Ivers). He was educated at Kalapa State School at Kalapa, Queensland and on leaving school became a dairy farmer, pig raiser and breeder.

On 16 June 1936 Jones married Doris Elsie McNamara and together had a son and a daughter. He died in October 1971 at his home in Yeppoon and was buried in the North Rockhampton Cemetery.

== Public career ==
Jones started out in politics as an alderman on the Fitzroy Shire Council from 1944 to 1950.

At the 1950 Queensland state election, Jones won the new seat of Callide for the Country Party, easily defeating his Labor opponent, Patrick Moore. He went on to represent the electorate until his death in 1971. Jones was the Chief Government Whip from 1960 to 1971.

Parliament of Queensland
New seat	Member for Callide; 1950–1971	Succeeded by Lindsay Hartwig
