= Chris Trevor =

Australian politician (born 1961)

Member of the Australian Parliament for Flynn
- In office 24 November 2007 – 21 August 2010
- Preceded by: New seat
- Succeeded by: Ken O'Dowd

Personal details
- Born: 23 June 1961 (age 64) Clermont, Queensland, Australia
- Party: Australian Labor Party
- Occupation: Solicitor

Chris Allan Trevor (born 23 June 1961) is an Australian politician. He was an Australian Labor Party member of the Australian House of Representatives, representing the Division of Flynn from 2007 to 2010. He had previously narrowly lost a contest against veteran independent Liz Cunningham for the state seat of Gladstone at the 2006 Queensland state election.

Trevor was a solicitor in Gladstone before entering politics, and was a member of the City of Gladstone council from 2004 to 2006. He was preselected as the Labor candidate for his local state seat of Gladstone at the 2006 state election, challenging conservative independent MLA Liz Cunningham. Cunningham had held the traditionally strongly Labor seat since 1995, and had established a significant margin despite her conservative views. Trevor ran a campaign tying Cunningham to the federal government's unpopular WorkChoices industrial relations laws, that while he narrowly lost, resulted in Cunningham's closest race since her initial election, 51.2% to 48%.

The following year, Trevor was drafted as the Labor candidate for the new federal seat of Flynn, which included Gladstone, after a crisis-torn Labor preselection process during which two previous candidates were dumped or had withdrawn, amid vote-rigging allegations. Flynn was notionally held by the governing Coalition, and was a seat which Labor could well have needed to win to gain office. Consequently, Labor leader Kevin Rudd publicly anointed Trevor as his preferred candidate to end the internal strife marring the campaign. Trevor narrowly won Flynn at the election, overcoming a National Party notional vote of 57.7% to Labor 42.3%, taking the seat with 50.2% as against the National Party's 49.8%

Trevor spoke out against the way Kevin Rudd was treated by the factional leaders of the ALP during and after Rudd's deposition in June 2010, saying that he nearly quit politics as a result.

Parliament of Australia
New division	Member for Flynn; 2007–2010	Succeeded by Ken O'Dowd
