= Liz Cunningham =

Australian politician

Member of the Queensland Legislative Assembly for Gladstone
- In office 15 July 1995 – 31 January 2015
- Preceded by: Neil Bennett
- Succeeded by: Glenn Butcher

Personal details
- Born: 22 January 1954 (age 72)
- Party: Independent
- Children: 3

Elizabeth Anne Cunningham is an Australian politician. She was an independent member of the Legislative Assembly of Queensland from 1995 to 2015, representing the electorate of Gladstone. A conservative MLA in a traditionally Labor district, Cunningham is perhaps most well known for having brought Rob Borbidge's Coalition minority government to power in 1996, following the loss of the Mundingburra by-election by the then Goss Labor government.

== Early life ==
Cunningham was involved in local politics prior to entering state politics, serving on the Calliope Shire Council from 1988 to 1995 and serving as its mayor from 1991 to 1995. A social conservative and devout Christian, she ran in the traditionally Labor seat of Gladstone in the 1992 election. She ran an unexpectedly strong campaign on "back to basics" issues, in particular concern about the downgrading of Gladstone Hospital. She narrowly lost to Labor candidate Neil Bennett in 1992, reducing the notional Labor majority from a comfortably safe margin of 12 percent to an extremely marginal two percent.

== Balance of power ==
Cunningham sought a rematch against Bennett in 1995, and defeated him after National preferences flowed overwhelmingly to her. She became the first non-Labor MLA for Gladstone in 63 years, and only the third in 80 years.

Cunningham's victory was especially significant in the light of the extremely close result of the 1995 state election. It initially appeared as if the result would be a hung parliament with Cunningham holding the balance of power, although later counting delivered a one-seat majority to the Goss Labor government. The situation nevertheless gave her significant influence, as she forced the retention of incumbent Speaker Jim Fouras for the new parliament over the party's desired replacement. Her inaugural speech in September 1995 reaffirmed her combined focus on community issues and social policy, criticising the Goss government's transport and health policies, and advocating the reintroduction of corporal punishment, a return to institutionalisation of the mentally ill, and a return to Christian values.

Cunningham's influence in the Assembly increased dramatically in December 1995 when the Court of Disputed Returns ordered a by-election in the seat of Mundingburra, which the Labor government had held by 16 votes in the general election. After a disastrous by-election campaign which included the disendorsement of incumbent MLA Ken Davies, Liberal candidate Frank Tanti won, costing the government its majority and leaving Cunningham in a position to effectively choose the next Premier of Queensland. Cunningham announced that she would support the Coalition on matters of confidence and supply in the Legislative Assembly, citing their having won the popular vote in the general election. Rather than face certain defeat in the legislature, Goss resigned, paving the way for Borbidge to succeed him. She declined an offer from the new government to become Speaker, insisting that it would compromise her ability to represent her electorate.

Throughout her first term, Cunningham generally supported the Coalition government. With her support, Borbidge was able to fend off numerous no-confidence motions and pass most of his major legislative proposals. When the ALP moved against the government over the Carruthers and Connolly-Ryan inquiries, Cunningham helped block a no-confidence motion in the government and, although she moved a motion against Attorney-General Denver Beanland, insisted that she did not demand his resignation. This resulted in criticism from some quarters that she was effectively another National MP.

She nevertheless insisted that the government consult with her on most legislation, including budgets and, she was also able to exercise significant power. This was made clear in 1996, when she watered down the government's workplace compensation reforms, despite strong government resistance, so as to retain access to the common law for injured workers, and workers compensation for travel to and from work, among other things. As a generally conservative MP, Cunningham became known for her opposition to abortion and her support of capital punishment. In 1996, she was the only member of the parliament to oppose new gun control reforms in the aftermath of the Port Arthur massacre, which otherwise received bipartisan support. The following year, Cunningham was responsible for an amendment which successfully defined the term "life" in the state's criminal code (assault provisions) as "beginning at conception".

== Later parliamentary career ==
Cunningham increased her primary vote at the 1998 state election, but her political influence severely declined when Peter Beattie formed an ALP government with the support of newly elected independent Peter Wellington. Taking a similar line to the state National Party, Cunningham noted in the lead-up to the election that she would be willing to work with any members of the far-right One Nation party if they were elected. She held her seat with an increased majority at the 2001 election even as Labor won its biggest victory ever in Queensland. She actually won enough primary votes to clinch reelection without the need for preferences.

In April 2002, Cunningham was stopped by police while driving and asked to undergo a breath test. She refused on the grounds of suffering asthma, and was subsequently charged. After receiving little sympathy from Premier Beattie, she was fined and had her driving license suspended. Her third term was also marked by an attempt to ban flag-burning, which failed after the government blocked her private member's bill on the grounds that it violated free speech. Her call for a Commission of Inquiry into child sexual abuse in foster care also failed due to opposition from the government. She received her highest primary vote yet at the 2004 election, again with enough votes to win without going to preferences.

Cunningham was nominated for Speaker after the election, with the support of the opposition National–Liberal coalition, One Nation, and the state's six independents, but was soundly defeated by government nominee Ray Hollis. She raised allegations of bullying against the management of the Gladstone Hospital in 2005, going to Rockhampton to testify before the Forster Review of the state's health system.

Cunningham was a strong favourite to retain her seat at the 2006 state election, which she held coming into the election by a margin of 11.2 points. However, after a strong local Labor campaign focusing on Cunningham's perceived support for controversial federal industrial relations laws, she came close to defeat, with her eventual victory over Labor candidate Chris Trevor being one of the last results declared of the election. During the next parliament, she voted against the cloning of embryos for stem cell research.

Cunningham once again retained her seat in the 2009 state election, despite a 4-point swing to Labor, and she was easily re-elected at the 2012 state election, achieving a swing of 8 points towards her after preferences were distributed.

In early 2015, Cunningham confirmed she would retire after the 2015 state election. Despite Cunningham's popularity, Gladstone remained a Labor stronghold at nearly all levels, and it was taken for granted that her seat would revert to Labor once she retired. Most calculations during her tenure showed that Gladstone was a safe Labor seat in "traditional" two-party matchups. These predictions proved correct, as her 2012 opponent, Glenn Butcher, won the seat resoundingly and has easily held the seat ever since.

== See also ==
- Members of the Queensland Legislative Assembly, 2004-2006
- Members of the Queensland Legislative Assembly, 2001-2004
- Members of the Queensland Legislative Assembly, 1998-2001
- Members of the Queensland Legislative Assembly, 1995-1998

Parliament of Queensland
Preceded by Neil Bennett	Member for Gladstone; 1995–2015	Succeeded by Glenn Butcher
