= Ken O'Dowd =

Australian politician

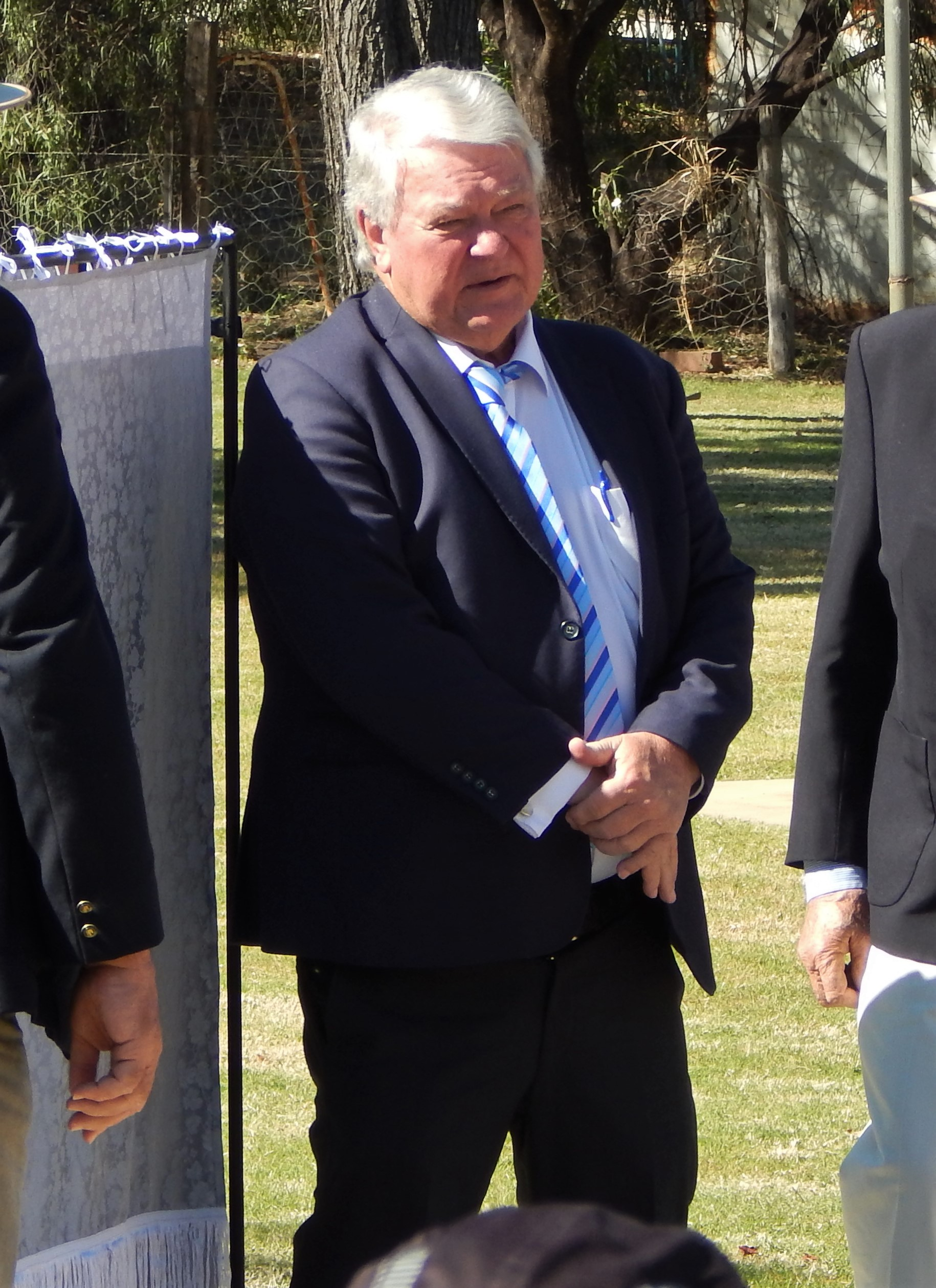
- O'Dowd in 2019

Member of the Australian Parliament for Flynn
- In office 21 August 2010 – 11 April 2022
- Preceded by: Chris Trevor
- Succeeded by: Colin Boyce

Personal details
- Born: Kenneth Desmond O'Dowd; 30 June 1950 (age 75) Gladstone, Queensland, Australia
- Party: Liberal National Party (Nationals)
- Domestic partner: Shirley Watts
- Children: 2

Kenneth Desmond O'Dowd (born 30 June 1950) is an Australian former politician. He was a member of the House of Representatives from 2010 to 2022, representing the Division of Flynn for the National Party.

== Early life ==
O'Dowd was born in Gladstone, Queensland. He grew up on his parents' farm in Bracewell, Mount Larcom. O'Dowd was educated at Bracewell State School, Mount Larcom High School and Rockhampton Grammar School. While still at school O'Dowd worked on his parents' farm, neighbours' farms, as a contract milker, on the railways as a fettler, on flying gangs, and on the construction of railway lines.

O'Dowd has two children and four grandchildren.

== Career ==
O'Dowd became a payroll clerk at Queensland Aluminium Limited (QAL) Gladstone. From 1970 to 1978 he worked on the construction of the Bougainville Copper Mine in New Guinea. In 1978, he worked at the Gladstone seaport terminal within the fuel industry, until establishing his own Mobil fuel distributorship in Emerald in 1981, which he sold in 1988. He became partner of a Shell distributorship in 1988, which was sold ten years later. In 1998, O'Dowd bought and renovated a Rockhampton pub, renaming it O'Dowd's Irish Pub, which he sold in 2004. From 1998, onwards he operated Busteed Building Supplies.

== Political career ==
O'Dowd contested the Division of Flynn for the Liberal National Party at the 2010 Federal election and won the seat from Labor's one term incumbent Chris Trevor. He continued to hold the seat in the 2013, 2016 and 2019 federal elections.

O'Dowd supports building HELE coal fired power stations, inland rail (such as the controversial Toowoomba Wellcamp Airport to Gladstone link), and opening up more agricultural land.

In November 2020, O'Dowd announced he would not contest the next election.

O'Dowd is a member of Parliamentary Friends of Palestine. He has stated on several occasions that Israel is perpetrating a form of apartheid upon Palestinians.

O'Dowd has disputed the scientific consensus on climate change, denying that climate change is caused by humanity.

Parliament of Australia
Preceded by Chris Trevor	Member for Flynn; 2010–2022	Succeeded by Colin Boyce
