= Electoral district of Gladstone =

State electoral district of Queensland, Australia

Gladstone Queensland—Legislative Assembly
- Electoral map of Gladstone 2017
- State: Queensland
- Created: 1992
- MP: Glenn Butcher
- Party: Labor Party
- Namesake: Gladstone
- Electors: 33,589 (2020)
- Area: 2,814 km^{2} (1,086.5 sq mi)
- Demographic: Provincial
- Coordinates: 23°57′S 151°21′E
Electorates around Gladstone:
Mirani	Keppel	Coral Sea
Callide	Gladstone	Coral Sea
Callide	Callide	Burnett

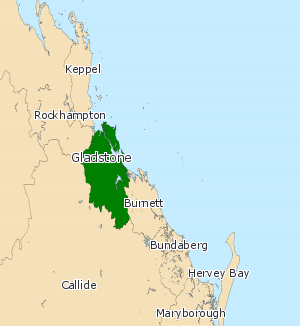
Electoral map of Gladstone 2008

Gladstone is an electoral district of the Legislative Assembly in the Australian state of Queensland.

The seat was created as a reconfigured version of Port Curtis for the 1992 election. It consists of the city of Gladstone and some of the towns of the former Shire of Calliope. This includes the localities of Ambrose, Benaraby, Boyne Island, Mount Larcom and Tannum Sands. The town of Calliope is now part of the Callide electoral district.

In the 2021 census, the electorate had a population of 50,317 people.

The current member is Labor MP Glenn Butcher. Butcher won the seat following the retirement of long-serving independent Liz Cunningham, who won the seat on National Party preferences after defeating then Labor MP Neil Bennett at the 1995 election. Cunningham was a well-known local figure, having previously been Mayor of the Shire of Calliope prior to entering State politics. Her 1995 victory made her the first non-Labor member for Gladstone and its predecessors since 1932, and only the second since 1915.

Even though Cunningham had held the seat without much difficulty, Gladstone had almost always been a safe Labor seat in calculations of "traditional" two-party matchups–i. e., Labor vs. National before 2009, and Labor vs. LNP since 2009. This is due almost entirely to the presence of the city of Gladstone, a Labor stronghold for the better part of a century. Proving this, Labor would have held the seat on a margin of 11 percent during its meltdown of 2012. Thus, it was not considered an upset when Butcher, who had been Cunningham's Labor opponent in 2012, easily reclaimed the seat for Labor at the 2015 election. Underlining Labor's strength in the seat, Butcher won an outright majority on the first count while pushing the LNP into third place.

Labor consolidated its hold on the seat in 2017, with Butcher picking up a healthy swing of 10.7 percent and again pushing the LNP into third place. He was reelected in 2020 with a two-party vote of 73.5 percent, making Gladstone the third-safest Labor seat in the state and the safest outside Brisbane.

== Members for Gladstone ==
Member	Party	Term
Neil Bennett	Labor	1992–1995
Liz Cunningham	Independent	1995–2015
Glenn Butcher	Labor	2015–present

== Election results ==
2024 Queensland state election: Gladstone
Party	Candidate	Votes	%	±%
Labor	Glenn Butcher	14,067	44.89	−19.61
Liberal National	Steve Askew	8,076	25.77	+10.57
One Nation	Andrew Jackson	4,497	14.35	+1.55
Greens	Beau Pett	1,722	5.50	+2.00
Legalise Cannabis	Brianna Corcoran	1,403	4.48	+4.48
Independent	Murray Peterson	901	2.88	−1.12
Family First	Christopher Herring	668	2.13	+2.13
Total formal votes		31,334	95.70	−1.17
Informal votes		1,407	4.30	+1.17
Turnout		32,741	88.17	+0.22
Two-party-preferred result
Labor	Glenn Butcher	18,554	59.21	−14.29
Liberal National	Steve Askew	12,780	40.79	+14.29
Labor hold		Swing	−14.29	

Primary vote results in Gladstone (parties that did not get 5% of the vote are omitted)
Labor
Liberal National

National
Liberal

One Nation
Katter's Australian
Independent
View source data.
Two-candidate-preferred vote results in Gladstone View source data.
