= Electoral district of Callide =

State electoral district of Queensland, Australia

Callide Queensland—Legislative Assembly
- Electoral map of Callide 2017
- State: Queensland
- MP: Bryson Head
- Party: Liberal National
- Namesake: Callide Creek in the Coalfields
- Electors: 33,907 (2020)
- Area: 74,199 km^{2} (28,648.4 sq mi)
- Demographic: Rural
- Coordinates: 25°5′S 150°42′E
Electorates around Callide:
Gregory	Mirani	Gladstone
Warrego	Callide	Burnett
Warrego	Nanango	Maryborough

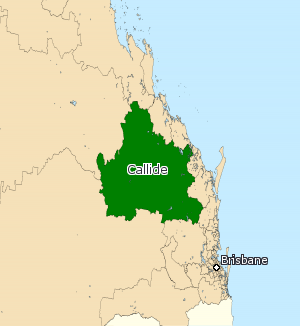
Electoral map of Callide 2008

Callide is an electoral division in Queensland, Australia.

It encompasses agricultural and mining towns in the Burnett, Callide and Dawson valleys. Major towns within the division's boundaries include Biloela, Calliope, Chinchilla, Jandowae, Miles, Bell, Monto, Eidsvold, Gin Gin, Biggenden, Gayndah, Mundubbera, Moura, Banana, Theodore, Baralaba, Taroom and Wandoan.

Located in traditional National territory, it has been in the hands of either that party or the merged Liberal National Party for its entire existence.

A by-election was held on 18 June 2022, following the resignation of Colin Boyce. LNP candidate Bryson Head was elected.

== Members for Callide ==
Member	Party	Term
Vince Jones	Country	1950–1971
Lindsay Hartwig	Country	1972–1974
Lindsay Hartwig	National	1974–1981
Lindsay Hartwig	Independent	1981–1986
Di McCauley	National	1986–1998
Jeff Seeney	National	1998–2008
Jeff Seeney	Liberal National	2008–2017
Colin Boyce	Liberal National	2017–2022
Bryson Head	Liberal National	2022–present

== Election results ==
2024 Queensland state election: Callide
Party	Candidate	Votes	%	±%
Liberal National	Bryson Head	17,917	56.88	−0.32
Labor	Samantha Dendle	5,611	17.81	−7.90
One Nation	Chris O'Callaghan	4,978	15.80	+15.80
Greens	Matthew Passant	1,279	4.06	+0.11
Family First	John Whittle	912	2.90	+2.90
Independent	Duncan Scott	804	2.55	+2.55
Total formal votes		31,501	96.49	−0.55
Informal votes		1,147	3.51	+0.55
Turnout		32,648	89.49	+1.25
Two-party-preferred result
Liberal National	Bryson Head	23,053	73.18	+7.35
Labor	Samantha Dendle	8,448	26.82	−7.35
Liberal National hold		Swing	+7.35	

2020 Queensland state election: Callide
Party	Candidate	Votes	%	±%
Liberal National	Colin Boyce	16,608	57.20	+23.77
Labor	Gordon Earnshaw	7,463	25.71	+3.55
Independent	Adam Burling	2,444	8.42	+8.42
Independent	Loris Doessel	1,371	4.72	+4.72
Greens	Anthony Walsh	1,147	3.95	+0.54
Total formal votes		29,033	97.04	+0.67
Informal votes		887	2.96	−0.67
Turnout		29,920	88.24	−1.19
Two-party-preferred result
Liberal National	Colin Boyce	19,112	65.83	+9.71
Labor	Gordon Earnshaw	9,921	34.17	+34.17
Liberal National hold				
