= Colin Boyce =

Australian politician (born 1962)

Colin Boyce MP
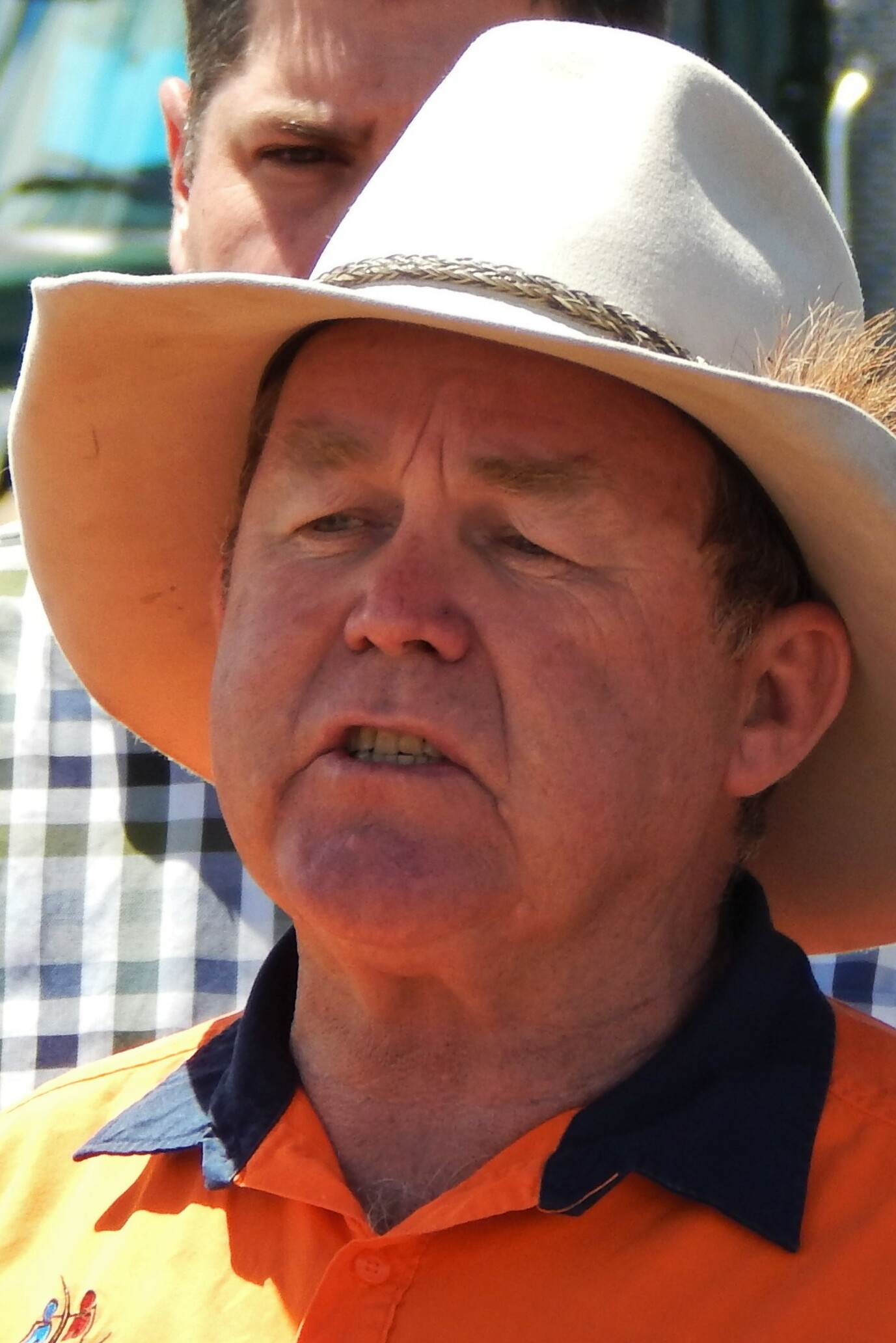

Member of the Australian Parliament for Flynn
- Incumbent
- Assumed office 21 May 2022
- Preceded by: Ken O'Dowd

Member of the Queensland Parliament for Callide
- In office 25 November 2017 – 29 March 2022
- Preceded by: Jeff Seeney
- Succeeded by: Bryson Head

Personal details
- Born: Colin Einar Boyce; 30 October 1962 (age 64) Toowoomba, Queensland, Australia
- Party: National (LNP)

Colin Einar Boyce (born 30 October 1962) is an Australian politician who is a member of the House of Representatives, representing the Division of Flynn since 2022. He is a member of the Liberal National Party and sits with the National Party in federal parliament.

Boyce was also previously the Liberal National Party member for Callide in the Queensland Legislative Assembly from 2017 to 2022 and served as councillor on Taroom Shire Council.

== Early career ==
Before becoming the state member for Callide, Boyce served as a councillor on Taroom Shire Council from 2005 until 2008. In 2008, he unsuccessfully attempted to be elected as the Division 6 candidate on Banana Shire Council. However, at a 2017 by-election, his wife Terri Boyce was elected to represent the same division.

Boyce is a qualified boilermaker and farmer who has been described as "an old-style Queensland National".

== State politics ==
Boyce was elected as the member for the Division of Callide in the 2017 state election.

In August 2020, he attracted some media attention when he crossed the floor and voted against his party, not offering his support for a bill to appoint a special commissioner to oversee mine rehabilitation.

== Federal politics ==
In January 2021 Boyce announced he would seek LNP preselection for the federal Division of Flynn to contest the 2022 federal election, following the retirement of Ken O'Dowd. Boyce subsequently won pre-selection and was officially announced as the LNP's candidate for Flynn on 13 July 2021 while visiting the Gladstone Power Station with Deputy Prime Minister Barnaby Joyce, Senator Matt Canavan and outgoing Flynn MP Ken O'Dowd.

Boyce officially resigned from his position as the state member for Callide in Queensland Parliament on 29 March 2022. Although Boyce wasn't required to resign until the federal election was officially called, he decided to do so to focus on his bid to win the Federal seat of Flynn, beginning by promoting the Australian federal budget which was handed down the night of his resignation from state parliament. His resignation triggered the 2022 Callide state by-election, which Queensland speaker Curtis Pitt announced would be held on 18 June 2022.

During his campaign to be elected as the member for Flynn, Boyce attracted media attention after making comments which questioned the Morrison government's plan to reach net zero carbon emissions by 2050.

Boyce was successful in his election to federal parliament in the election in May 2022, achieving a narrow victory over Labor candidate Matt Burnett.

Following his election to federal parliament, Boyce was criticised by Queensland resources minister Scott Stewart who said during parliamentary question time on 24 May 2022 that Boyce had made it clear that he was "an LNP climate change denier." This was followed by an article in The Guardian two days later which revealed Boyce was a foundation member of The Saltbush Club, and in 2019 had been a signatory to an international statement which claimed there was no climate emergency.

In his First Speech on 28 July 2022, Boyce spoke of the importance of food security, saying: “one of the biggest issues the world faces is food security, and our ability to provide enough food will be one of our greatest challenges as we move to the future.”

At the Nationals Federal Convention in 2025, Boyce voted to remove Australia’s commitment to net-zero emissions by 2050 from the party’s policy platform. He has previously claimed that “16,000 jobs in his electorate were being put at risk by the policy.”

Boyce urged a review of Queensland’s Local Government Act after the North Burnett Regional Council announced a 25 percent increase to general rates in its 2025–26 budget. He argued that the “exorbitant” rise was driven by the growing expense of complying with increasingly complex state government regulations.

On 28 January 2026, Boyce announced he would challenge David Littleproud for leadership of the National Party of Australia in the 2026 National Party of Australia leadership spill. He stated that he is challenging Littleproud for the leadership due to his decision to split from the Liberal-National Coalition earlier that month, calling it "political suicide". His leadership challenge was unsuccessful, with Littleproud retaining his position.

Following the 2026 Farrer by-election Boyce publicly considered leaving the Nationals to join One Nation, saying “I consider a lot of things… At this point in time, I’m a member of the National Party - that’s Sunday morning, whatever the date is today.”

== Political views ==
Boyce is opposed to net-zero emissions, and supports building more coal-fired power stations. During a podcast in July 2024, Boyce said that he believes purposefully allowing power blackouts in major cities will turn Australians against renewable energy. He has also described blackouts as a "political opportunity." He was a founding member of the ‘Saltbush Club’, a club formed to promote climate science denial and was a signatory to an international statement claiming “there is no climate emergency.”

He has been vocal in his opposition to the Federal Department of Transport's proposal to lower regional speed limits to 80 kilometres per hour on sealed roads and 70 kilometres per hour on unsealed roads, suggesting that country people want their Government to “invest in fixing our roads, not letting them deteriorate" rather than "forcing councils and state governments to slash the speed limits.”

Boyce generated controversy over comments made during a debate over a government bill to encourage gender equity business targets in December 2024 over a contentious government bill regarding gender equity business targets. He claimed that "You cannot possibly compare women who are working in the childcare sector, as an example, to men who work in the construction industry" and that legislation to encourage gender equity targets for large companies would not help achieve what women "actually want to do". His comments were criticized by female MPs with Minister for Women Katy Gallagher calling them a form of "casual misogyny". He later made a statement to the ABC saying "as a father to a daughter and grandfather to granddaughters, I am a strong believer and advocate for men and women to be paid the same for the same job."

Following the 2025 Bondi Beach shooting, Boyce criticised the Federal Labor Government’s focus on gun law reform, stating: “Australia does not have a gun law problem. We have a security and immigration problem caused by a weak Government”.

Parliament of Australia
Preceded by Ken O'Dowd	Member for Flynn; 2022–present	Incumbent
Parliament of Queensland
Preceded by Jeff Seeney	Member for Callide; 2017–2022	Succeeded by Bryson Head
