= Members of the Queensland Legislative Assembly, 2012–2015 =

- ←2009–2012 2017–2020→

Members of the Queensland Legislative Assembly, 2012–2015

This is a list of members of the 54th Legislative Assembly of Queensland from 2012 to 2015, as elected at the 2012 election held on 24 March 2012.

Name	Party	Electorate	Term in office
Verity Barton	Liberal National	Broadwater	2012–2017
Ros Bates	Liberal National	Mudgeeraba	2009–present
Stephen Bennett	Liberal National	Burnett	2012–present
Ian Berry	Liberal National	Ipswich	2012–2015
Jarrod Bleijie	Liberal National	Kawana	2009–present
Anna Bligh ^{[1]}	Labor	South Brisbane	1995–2012
Mark Boothman	Liberal National	Albert	2012–present
Bill Byrne	Labor	Rockhampton	2012–2017
Robert Cavallucci	Liberal National	Brisbane Central	2012–2015
Sean Choat	Liberal National	Ipswich West	2012–2015
Jason Costigan	Liberal National	Whitsunday	2012–2020
Sam Cox	Liberal National	Thuringowa	2012–2015
Michael Crandon	Liberal National	Coomera	2009–present
Andrew Cripps	Liberal National	Hinchinbrook	2006–2017
David Crisafulli	Liberal National	Mundingburra	2012–2015, 2017–present
Liz Cunningham	Independent	Gladstone	1995–2015
Yvette D'Ath ^{[4]}	Labor	Redcliffe	2014–present
Steve Davies	Liberal National	Capalaba	2012–2015
Dr Chris Davis ^{[5]}	Liberal National	Stafford	2012–2014
Tracy Davis	Liberal National	Aspley	2009–2017
Jack Dempsey	Liberal National	Bundaberg	2006–2015
Steve Dickson	Liberal National	Buderim	2006–2017
Aaron Dillaway	Liberal National	Bulimba	2012–2015
Dr Alex Douglas	Liberal National/Independent/ PUP/ Independent^{[3]}	Gaven	2006, 2009–2015
Peter Dowling	Liberal National	Redlands	2009–2015
Scott Driscoll	Liberal National/Independent^{[4]}	Redcliffe	2012–2013
Glen Elmes	Liberal National	Noosa	2006–2017
Scott Emerson	Liberal National	Indooroopilly	2009–2017
Dr Bruce Flegg	Liberal National	Moggill	2004–2015
Lisa France	Liberal National	Pumicestone	2012–2015
Deb Frecklington	Liberal National	Nanango	2012–present
David Gibson	Liberal National	Gympie	2006–2015
John Grant	Liberal National	Springwood	2012–2015
Darren Grimwade	Liberal National	Morayfield	2012–2015
Reg Gulley	Liberal National	Murrumba	2012–2015
Michael Hart	Liberal National	Burleigh	2012–present
John Hathaway	Liberal National	Townsville	2012–2015
Howard Hobbs	Liberal National	Warrego	1986–2015
Seath Holswich	Liberal National	Pine Rivers	2012–2015
Ray Hopper	Liberal National/KAP^{[2]}	Condamine	2001–2015
Vaughan Johnson	Liberal National	Gregory	1989–2015
Carl Judge	Liberal National/ Independent/ PUP/Independent^{[3]}	Yeerongpilly	2012–2015
Robbie Katter	KAP	Mount Isa	2012–present
Ian Kaye	Liberal National	Greenslopes	2012–2015
David Kempton	Liberal National	Cook	2012–2015
Gavin King	Liberal National	Cairns	2012–2015
Shane Knuth	KAP	Dalrymple	2004–present
Jon Krause	Liberal National	Beaudesert	2012–present
John-Paul Langbroek	Liberal National	Surfers Paradise	2004–present
Mike Latter	Liberal National	Waterford	2012–2015
Dr Anthony Lynham ^{[5]}	Labor	Stafford	2014–2020
Anne Maddern	Liberal National	Maryborough	2012–2015
Ted Malone	Liberal National	Mirani	1994–2015
Tim Mander	Liberal National	Everton	2012–present
Mark McArdle	Liberal National	Caloundra	2004–2020
John McVeigh	Liberal National	Toowoomba South	2012–2016
Rosemary Menkens	Liberal National	Burdekin	2004–2015
Kerry Millard	Liberal National	Sandgate	2012–2015
Jo-Ann Miller	Labor	Bundamba	2000–2020
Steve Minnikin	Liberal National	Chatsworth	2012–present
Rob Molhoek	Liberal National	Southport	2012–present
Tim Mulherin	Labor	Mackay	1995–2015
Campbell Newman	Liberal National	Ashgrove	2012–2015
Tim Nicholls	Liberal National	Clayfield	2006–present
Freya Ostapovitch	Liberal National	Stretton	2012–2015
Annastacia Palaszczuk	Labor	Inala	2006–present
Curtis Pitt	Labor	Mulgrave	2009–present
Andrew Powell	Liberal National	Glass House	2009–present
Michael Pucci	Liberal National	Logan	2012–2015
Saxon Rice	Liberal National	Mount Coot-tha	2012–2015
Ian Rickuss	Liberal National	Lockyer	2004–2017
Mark Robinson	Liberal National	Cleveland	2009–present
Trevor Ruthenberg	Liberal National	Kallangur	2012–2015
Desley Scott	Labor	Woodridge	2001–2015
Jeff Seeney	Liberal National	Callide	1998–2017
Anthony Shorten	Liberal National	Algester	2012–2015
Dale Shuttleworth	Liberal National	Ferny Grove	2012–2015
Fiona Simpson	Liberal National	Maroochydore	1992–present
Tarnya Smith	Liberal National	Mount Ommaney	2012–2017
Ted Sorensen	Liberal National	Hervey Bay	2009–2020
Lawrence Springborg	Liberal National	Southern Downs	1989–2017
Ray Stevens	Liberal National	Mermaid Beach	2006–present
Mark Stewart	Liberal National	Sunnybank	2012–2015
Jann Stuckey	Liberal National	Currumbin	2004–2020
Neil Symes	Liberal National	Lytton	2012–2015
Jackie Trad ^{[1]}	Labor	South Brisbane	2012–2020
Michael Trout	Liberal National	Barron River	2012–2015
Ian Walker	Liberal National	Mansfield	2012–2017
Trevor Watts	Liberal National	Toowoomba North	2012–present
Peter Wellington	Independent	Nicklin	1998–2017
Jason Woodforth	Liberal National	Nudgee	2012–2015
Bruce Young	Liberal National	Keppel	2012–2015

== See also ==
- Speaker of the Legislative Assembly of Queensland

== Notes ==
^{1} South Brisbane Labor MP and former Premier Anna Bligh resigned on 30 March 2012. Labor candidate Jackie Trad won the resulting by-election on 28 April 2012.
^{2} Condamine MP Ray Hopper resigned from the Liberal National Party and joined Katter's Australian Party on 24 November 2012.
^{3} Gaven MP Alex Douglas and Yeerongpilly MP Carl Judge resigned from the Liberal National Party on 29 November 2012 and subsequently sat as independents until they joined the Palmer United Party on 30 April 2013. Douglas subsequently resigned from the Palmer United Party in August 2014 and sat again as an independent. Judge resigned from the Palmer United Party in October 2014 and sat again as an independent.
^{4} Redcliffe MP Scott Driscoll was suspended from the Liberal National Party on 25 March 2013, and resigned from the party the following month. He subsequently sat as an independent until he resigned from Parliament on 19 November 2013. Labor candidate Yvette D'Ath won the resulting by-election on 22 February 2014.
^{5} Stafford Liberal National MP Chris Davis resigned on 23 May 2014. Labor candidate Anthony Lynham won the resulting by-election on 19 July 2014.
