= Members of the Queensland Legislative Assembly, 2009–2012 =

- ←2006–2009 2012–2015→

This is a list of members of the 53rd Legislative Assembly of Queensland from 2009 to 2012, as elected at the 2009 election held on 21 March 2009.

Name	Party	District	First elected
Julie Attwood	Labor	Mount Ommaney	1998–2012
Ros Bates	Liberal National	Mudgeeraba	2009–present
Jarrod Bleijie	Liberal National	Kawana	2009–present
Hon Anna Bligh	Labor	South Brisbane	1995–2012
Hon Desley Boyle	Labor	Cairns	1998–2012
Michael Choi	Labor	Capalaba	2001–2012
Michael Crandon	Liberal National	Coomera	2009–present
Andrew Cripps	Liberal National	Hinchinbrook	2006–2017
Peta-Kaye Croft	Labor	Broadwater	2001–2012
Liz Cunningham	Independent	Gladstone	1995–2015
Vicky Darling	Labor	Sandgate	2006–2012
Tracy Davis	Liberal National	Aspley	2009–2017
Jack Dempsey	Liberal National	Bundaberg	2006–2015
Hon Cameron Dick	Labor	Greenslopes	2009–2012, 2015–present
Steve Dickson	Liberal National	Buderim	2006–present
Dr Alex Douglas	Liberal National	Gaven	2006, 2009–2015
Peter Dowling	Liberal National	Redlands	2009–2015
Glen Elmes	Liberal National	Noosa	2006–2017
Scott Emerson	Liberal National	Indooroopilly	2009–2017
Di Farmer	Labor	Bulimba	2009–2012, 2015–present
Simon Finn	Labor	Yeerongpilly	2004–2012
Dr Bruce Flegg	Liberal National	Moggill	2004–2015
Chris Foley	Independent	Maryborough	2003–2012
Hon Andrew Fraser	Labor	Mount Coot-tha	2004–2012
David Gibson	Liberal National	Gympie	2006–2015
Grace Grace	Labor	Brisbane Central	2007–2012, 2015–present
Hon Stirling Hinchliffe	Labor	Stafford	2006–2012, 2015–present
Howard Hobbs	Liberal National	Warrego	1986–2015
Paul Hoolihan	Labor	Keppel	2004–2012
Ray Hopper	Liberal National	Condamine	2001–2015
Mike Horan	Liberal National	Toowoomba South	1991–2012
Jan Jarratt	Labor	Whitsunday	2001–2012
Vaughan Johnson	Liberal National	Gregory	1989–2015
Mandy Johnstone	Labor	Townsville	2009–2012
Hon Kate Jones	Labor	Ashgrove	2006–2012, 2015–2020
Hon Margaret Keech	Labor	Albert	2001–2012
Betty Kiernan	Labor	Mount Isa	2006–2012
Steve Kilburn	Labor	Chatsworth	2009–2012
Shane Knuth	Liberal National/Katter's Australian Party ^{[2]}	Dalrymple	2004–present
John-Paul Langbroek	Liberal National	Surfers Paradise	2004–present
Hon Peter Lawlor	Labor	Southport	2001–2012
Hon Paul Lucas	Labor	Lytton	1996–2012
Carolyn Male	Labor	Pine Rivers	2001–2012
Ted Malone	Liberal National	Mirani	1994–2015
Mark McArdle	Liberal National	Caloundra	2004–2020
Aidan McLindon	Liberal National/Independent/ Queensland Party/ Katter's Australian Party^{1}	Beaudesert	2009–2012
Rosemary Menkens	Liberal National	Burdekin	2004–2015
Rob Messenger	Liberal National/Independent^{[1]}	Burnett	2004–2012
Hon John Mickel	Labor	Logan	1998–2012
Jo-Ann Miller	Labor	Bundamba	2000–2020
Evan Moorhead	Labor	Waterford	2006–2012
Hon Tim Mulherin	Labor	Mackay	1995–2015
Hon Lindy Nelson-Carr	Labor	Mundingburra	1998–2012
Tim Nicholls	Liberal National	Clayfield	2006–present
Hon Rachel Nolan	Labor	Ipswich	2001–2012
Jason O'Brien	Labor	Cook	2004–2012
Mary-Anne O'Neill	Labor	Kallangur	2009–2012
Hon Annastacia Palaszczuk	Labor	Inala	2006–present
Curtis Pitt	Labor	Mulgrave	2009–present
Andrew Powell	Liberal National	Glass House	2009–present
Dorothy Pratt	Independent	Nanango	1998–2012
Hon Phil Reeves	Labor	Mansfield	1998–2012
Ian Rickuss	Liberal National	Lockyer	2004–2017
Hon Neil Roberts	Labor	Nudgee	1995–2012
Hon Stephen Robertson	Labor	Stretton	1992–2012
Mark Robinson	Liberal National	Cleveland	2009–present
Mark Ryan	Labor	Morayfield	2009–2012, 2015–present
Hon Robert Schwarten	Labor	Rockhampton	1989–1992, 1995–2012
Desley Scott	Labor	Woodridge	2001–2015
Jeff Seeney	Liberal National	Callide	1998–2017
Hon Kerry Shine	Labor	Toowoomba North	2001–2012
Fiona Simpson	Liberal National	Maroochydore	1992–present
Christine Smith	Labor	Burleigh	2001–2012
Ted Sorensen	Liberal National	Hervey Bay	2009–2020
Hon Judy Spence	Labor	Sunnybank	2001–2012
Lawrence Springborg	Liberal National	Southern Downs	1989–2017
Ray Stevens	Liberal National	Mermaid Beach	2006–present
Barbara Stone	Labor	Springwood	2001–2012
Hon Karen Struthers	Labor	Algester	1998–2012
Jann Stuckey	Liberal National	Currumbin	2004–2020
Carryn Sullivan	Labor	Pumicestone	2001–2012
Lillian van Litsenburg	Labor	Redcliffe	2006–2012
Hon Craig Wallace	Labor	Thuringowa	2004–2012
Murray Watt	Labor	Everton	2009–2012
Peter Wellington	Independent	Nicklin	1998–2017
Hon Dean Wells	Labor	Murrumba	1986–2012
Wayne Wendt	Labor	Ipswich West	2006–2012
Steve Wettenhall	Labor	Barron River	2006–2012
Hon Geoff Wilson	Labor	Ferny Grove	1998–2012

^{1} On 4 May 2010, Beaudesert MP Aidan McLindon and Burnett MP Rob Messenger resigned from the Liberal Nationals to sit as independents. McLindon formed The Queensland Party in June; it was registered on 5 August. Messenger did not join the new party. The Queensland Party later merged with Katter's Australian Party in 2011.
^{2} Dalrymple MP Shane Knuth resigned from the Liberal National Party and joined Katter's Australian Party on 30 October 2011.

== See also ==
- Speaker of the Legislative Assembly of Queensland
- Premier: Anna Bligh (Labor) (2007–present)
