= Electoral results for the district of Beaudesert =

Queensland, Australia, district election results

This is a list of electoral results for the electoral district of Beaudesert in Queensland state elections.

== Members for Beaudesert ==
| Member | Party | Term |
|---|---|---|
| Kev Lingard | The Nationals | 1992–2008 |
| Kev Lingard | Liberal National | 2008–2009 |
| Aidan McLindon | Liberal National | 2009–2010 |
| Aidan McLindon | Independent | 2010 |
| Aidan McLindon | The Queensland Party | 2010–2011 |
| Aidan McLindon | Katter's Australian Party | 2011–2012 |
| Jon Krause | Liberal National | 2012–2017 |

== Election results ==
=== Elections in the 2010s ===
2015 Queensland state election: Beaudesert
| Party | Candidate | Votes | % | ±% |
|---|---|---|---|---|
| Liberal National | Jon Krause | 15,086 | 47.47 | +0.36 |
| Labor | Kay Hohenhaus | 9,281 | 29.20 | +15.23 |
| Greens | Pietro Agnoletto | 2,613 | 8.22 | −0.11 |
| One Nation | Robert Bowyer | 2,145 | 6.75 | +4.16 |
| Palmer United | Adele Ishaac | 1,989 | 6.26 | +6.26 |
| Family First | Jeremy Fredericks | 668 | 2.10 | +0.47 |
| Total formal votes | | 31,782 | 97.69 | −0.16 |
| Informal votes | | 753 | 2.31 | +0.16 |
| Turnout | | 32,535 | 91.28 | −1.29 |
Two-party-preferred result
| Liberal National | Jon Krause | 16,440 | 57.53 | −3.03 |
| Labor | Kay Hohenhaus | 12,138 | 42.47 | +42.47 |
| Liberal National hold | | Swing | −3.03 | |

2012 Queensland state election: Beaudesert
| Party | Candidate | Votes | % | ±% |
|---|---|---|---|---|
| Liberal National | Jon Krause | 13,835 | 47.11 | +9.21 |
| Katter's Australian | Aidan McLindon | 7,744 | 26.37 | +26.37 |
| Labor | Brett McCreadie | 4,105 | 13.98 | −10.96 |
| Greens | Andy Grodecki | 2,448 | 8.34 | +1.36 |
| One Nation | Jim Savage | 760 | 2.59 | +2.59 |
| Family First | Walter Abrahamson | 478 | 1.63 | +1.63 |
| Total formal votes | | 29,370 | 97.84 | −0.43 |
| Informal votes | | 648 | 2.16 | +0.43 |
| Turnout | | 30,018 | 92.57 | +0.39 |
Two-candidate-preferred result
| Liberal National | Jon Krause | 14,836 | 60.56 | +2.25 |
| Katter's Australian | Aidan McLindon | 9,661 | 39.44 | +39.44 |
| Liberal National hold | | Swing | 2.25 | |

=== Elections in the 2000s ===
2009 Queensland state election: Beaudesert
| Party | Candidate | Votes | % | ±% |
|---|---|---|---|---|
| Liberal National | Aidan McLindon | 10,700 | 37.9 | −12.6 |
| Labor | Brett McCreadie | 7,012 | 24.8 | −13.3 |
| Independent | Pauline Hanson | 5,998 | 21.2 | +21.2 |
| Independent | Keith Gee | 2,191 | 7.8 | +7.8 |
| Greens | Andy Grodecki | 1,970 | 7.0 | −4.4 |
| DS4SEQ | Russell Pata | 193 | 0.7 | +0.7 |
| Independent | Richard Somers | 166 | 0.6 | +0.6 |
| Total formal votes | | 28,230 | 98.1 | |
| Informal votes | | 498 | 1.9 | |
| Turnout | | 28,728 | 92.2 | |
Two-party-preferred result
| Liberal National | Aidan McLindon | 12,418 | 58.3 | +2.4 |
| Labor | Brett McCreadie | 8,879 | 41.7 | −2.4 |
| Liberal National hold | | Swing | +2.4 | |

2006 Queensland state election: Beaudesert
| Party | Candidate | Votes | % | ±% |
|---|---|---|---|---|
| National | Kev Lingard | 14,250 | 49.2 | +0.6 |
| Labor | Brett Raguse | 11,413 | 39.4 | +5.5 |
| Greens | Andy Grodecki | 3,326 | 11.5 | +4.5 |
| Total formal votes | | 28,989 | 98.0 | −0.3 |
| Informal votes | | 598 | 2.0 | −0.3 |
| Turnout | | 29,587 | 91.8 | −1.0 |
Two-party-preferred result
| National | Kev Lingard | 14,944 | 54.5 | −3.6 |
| Labor | Brett Raguse | 12,483 | 45.5 | +3.6 |
| National hold | | Swing | −3.6 | |

2004 Queensland state election: Beaudesert
| Party | Candidate | Votes | % | ±% |
|---|---|---|---|---|
| National | Kev Lingard | 13,349 | 48.6 | +16.7 |
| Labor | Michael De Lacy | 9,326 | 33.9 | −0.2 |
| One Nation | Lesley Millar | 2,889 | 10.5 | −19.0 |
| Greens | Mike Beale | 1,922 | 7.0 | +7.0 |
| Total formal votes | | 27,486 | 98.3 | −0.1 |
| Informal votes | | 469 | 1.7 | +0.1 |
| Turnout | | 27,955 | 92.8 | −1.5 |
Two-party-preferred result
| National | Kev Lingard | 14,552 | 58.1 | +6.1 |
| Labor | Michael De Lacy | 10,511 | 41.9 | −6.1 |
| National hold | | Swing | +6.1 | |

2001 Queensland state election: Beaudesert
| Party | Candidate | Votes | % | ±% |
|---|---|---|---|---|
| Labor | Pam Stephenson | 8,868 | 34.1 | +7.8 |
| National | Kev Lingard | 8,297 | 31.9 | −2.2 |
| One Nation | Rae Benson | 7,680 | 29.5 | −2.1 |
| Independent | Kim Limburg | 1,166 | 4.5 | +4.5 |
| Total formal votes | | 26,011 | 98.4 | |
| Informal votes | | 433 | 1.6 | |
| Turnout | | 26,444 | 94.3 | |
Two-party-preferred result
| National | Kev Lingard | 10,876 | 52.0 | −7.0 |
| Labor | Pam Stephenson | 10,042 | 48.0 | +7.0 |
| National hold | | Swing | −7.0 | |

=== Elections in the 1990s ===
1998 Queensland state election: Beaudesert
| Party | Candidate | Votes | % | ±% |
|---|---|---|---|---|
| National | Kev Lingard | 7,766 | 32.9 | −23.3 |
| Labor | Michael De Lacy | 7,388 | 31.3 | −5.4 |
| One Nation | Gordon Wadsworth | 6,464 | 27.4 | +27.4 |
| Australia First | Nick Duke | 780 | 3.3 | +3.3 |
| Greens | Bill Livermore | 721 | 3.1 | +3.1 |
| Reform | Don Green | 202 | 0.9 | +0.9 |
| Shooters | Vin McNamara | 148 | 0.6 | +0.6 |
| Independent | Ian Dillon | 122 | 0.5 | +0.5 |
| Total formal votes | | 23,591 | 98.4 | −0.1 |
| Informal votes | | 381 | 1.6 | +0.1 |
| Turnout | | 23,972 | 93.8 | +1.7 |
Two-party-preferred result
| National | Kev Lingard | 10,734 | 54.1 | −5.4 |
| Labor | Michael De Lacy | 9,111 | 45.9 | +5.4 |
| National hold | | Swing | −5.4 | |

1995 Queensland state election: Beaudesert
| Party | Candidate | Votes | % | ±% |
|---|---|---|---|---|
| National | Kev Lingard | 11,993 | 56.3 | +16.7 |
| Labor | Pat Taylor | 7,833 | 36.7 | −8.1 |
| Democrats | Arthur Hickman | 1,492 | 7.0 | +7.0 |
| Total formal votes | | 21,318 | 98.6 | +0.8 |
| Informal votes | | 313 | 1.4 | −0.8 |
| Turnout | | 21,631 | 92.1 | |
Two-party-preferred result
| National | Kev Lingard | 12,496 | 59.5 | +6.2 |
| Labor | Pat Taylor | 8,520 | 40.5 | −6.2 |
| National hold | | Swing | +6.2 | |

1992 Queensland state election: Beaudesert
| Party | Candidate | Votes | % | ±% |
|---|---|---|---|---|
| Labor | Don Petersen | 8,544 | 44.8 | +1.2 |
| National | Kev Lingard | 7,529 | 39.5 | +11.6 |
| Liberal | John Taylor | 2,985 | 15.7 | −7.5 |
| Total formal votes | | 19,058 | 97.8 | |
| Informal votes | | 433 | 2.2 | |
| Turnout | | 19,491 | 92.3 | |
Two-party-preferred result
| National | Kev Lingard | 9,964 | 53.2 | +2.2 |
| Labor | Don Petersen | 8,759 | 46.8 | −2.2 |
| National hold | | Swing | +2.2 | |
