= Electoral results for the district of Brisbane Central =

Queensland, Australia, district election results

This is a list of electoral results for the electoral district of Brisbane Central in Queensland state elections.

== Members for Brisbane Central ==
Member	Party	Term
Brian Davis	Labor	1977–1989
Peter Beattie	Labor	1989–2007
Grace Grace	Labor	2007–2012
Robert Cavallucci	Liberal National	2012–2015
Grace Grace	Labor	2015–2017

== Election results ==
=== Elections in the 2010s ===
2015 Queensland state election: Brisbane Central
Party	Candidate	Votes	%	±%
Liberal National	Robert Cavallucci	12,042	41.81	−6.89
Labor	Grace Grace	10,590	36.77	+3.10
Greens	Kirsten Lovejoy	5,355	18.59	+3.26
Independent	Kai Jones	815	2.83	+0.53
Total formal votes		28,802	98.36	+0.01
Informal votes		481	1.64	−0.01
Turnout		29,283	84.96	−1.93
Two-party-preferred result
Labor	Grace Grace	14,334	53.25	+8.13
Liberal National	Robert Cavallucci	12,584	46.75	−8.13
Labor gain from Liberal National		Swing	+8.13	

2012 Queensland state election: Brisbane Central
Party	Candidate	Votes	%	±%
Liberal National	Robert Cavallucci	12,201	48.70	+11.46
Labor	Grace Grace	8,435	33.67	−8.49
Greens	Anne Boccabella	3,842	15.33	−1.67
Independent	Ruth Bonnett	576	2.30	+2.30
Total formal votes		25,054	98.35	−0.15
Informal votes		420	1.65	+0.15
Turnout		25,474	86.89	+0.52
Two-party-preferred result
Liberal National	Robert Cavallucci	12,689	54.88	+10.85
Labor	Grace Grace	10,432	45.12	−10.85
Liberal National gain from Labor		Swing	+10.85	

=== Elections in the 2000s ===
2009 Queensland state election: Brisbane Central
Party	Candidate	Votes	%	±%
Labor	Grace Grace	10,238	42.2	−7.7
Liberal National	Mark Wood	9,042	37.2	+8.1
Greens	Anne Boccabella	4,129	17.0	−1.5
DS4SEQ	Adrian Miller	873	3.6	+3.6
Total formal votes		24,282	98.3	
Informal votes		371	1.7	
Turnout		24,653	86.4	
Two-party-preferred result
Labor	Grace Grace	12,548	56.0	−8.4
Liberal National	Mark Wood	9,870	44.0	+8.4
Labor hold		Swing	−8.4	

2007 Brisbane Central state by-election
Party	Candidate	Votes	%	±%
Labor	Grace Grace	11,248	50.35	−0.13
Greens	Anne Boccabella	7,396	33.11	+14.83
Family First	Mark A. White	1,738	7.78	+7.78
Independent	Erik Olaf Eriksen	711	3.18	+3.18
Independent	Ronald Davy	674	3.02	+3.02
One Nation	Ian Nelson	574	2.57	+2.57
Total formal votes		30,111	93.21	−1.16
Informal votes		2,193	6.79	+1.16
Turnout		32,304	84.93	−6.86
Two-candidate-preferred result
Labor	Grace Grace	11,594	57.85	−6.92
Greens	Anne Boccabella	8,449	42.15	+42.15
Labor hold		Swing	N/A	

2006 Queensland state election: Brisbane Central
Party	Candidate	Votes	%	±%
Labor	Peter Beattie	13,563	50.5	−7.8
Liberal	Craig Thomas	7,748	28.8	+2.7
Greens	Larissa Waters	4,912	18.3	+6.0
Independent	Sam Watson	500	1.9	+1.9
Independent	Alan Skyring	145	0.5	+0.0
Total formal votes		26,868	98.5	+0.1
Informal votes		415	1.5	−0.1
Turnout		27,283	84.7	+0.0
Two-party-preferred result
Labor	Peter Beattie	15,888	64.8	−4.8
Liberal	Craig Thomas	8,642	35.2	+4.8
Labor hold		Swing	−4.8	

2004 Queensland state election: Brisbane Central
Party	Candidate	Votes	%	±%
Labor	Peter Beattie	14,644	58.3	−6.4
Liberal	Reg Little	6,563	26.1	+5.1
Greens	Richard Nielsen	3,095	12.3	+5.4
Independent	Coral Wynter	376	1.5	+0.6
Independent	Adrian McAvoy	310	1.2	+1.2
Independent	Alan Skyring	117	0.5	−0.1
Total formal votes		25,105	98.4	+0.3
Informal votes		403	1.6	−0.3
Turnout		25,508	84.7	−3.3
Two-party-preferred result
Labor	Peter Beattie	16,221	69.6	−5.4
Liberal	Reg Little	7,093	30.4	+5.4
Labor hold		Swing	−5.4	

2001 Queensland state election: Brisbane Central
Party	Candidate	Votes	%	±%
Labor	Peter Beattie	14,894	64.7	+11.1
Liberal	Joe Vasta	4,839	21.0	−5.6
Greens	Richard Nielsen	1,579	6.9	+2.6
Independent	Tamara Tonite	974	4.2	+4.2
Independent	Samuel Tornatore	201	0.9	+0.9
Independent	Coral Wynter	200	0.9	+0.9
Independent	Alan Skyring	127	0.6	+0.6
Independent	Dionne Buckley	112	0.5	+0.5
Independent	Jayson Dalton	84	0.4	+0.4
Total formal votes		23,010	98.1	
Informal votes		441	1.9	
Turnout		23,451	88.0	
Two-party-preferred result
Labor	Peter Beattie	15,936	75.0	+10.2
Liberal	Joe Vasta	5,322	25.0	−10.2
Labor hold		Swing	+10.2	

=== Elections in the 1990s ===
1998 Queensland state election: Brisbane Central
Party	Candidate	Votes	%	±%
Labor	Peter Beattie	10,632	53.7	+3.7
Liberal	Tony Gleeson	5,179	26.2	−9.4
One Nation	John Beattie	1,925	9.7	+9.7
Greens	Richard Nielsen	932	4.7	−4.7
Democrats	Nicky Jones	783	4.0	+4.0
Independent	Graham Matthews	351	1.8	+1.8
Total formal votes		19,802	98.5	+0.5
Informal votes		308	1.5	−0.5
Turnout		20,110	89.3	+2.0
Two-party-preferred result
Labor	Peter Beattie	12,241	65.1	+4.9
Liberal	Tony Gleeson	6,549	34.9	−4.9
Labor hold		Swing	+4.9	

1995 Queensland state election: Brisbane Central
Party	Candidate	Votes	%	±%
Labor	Peter Beattie	8,651	50.0	−8.7
Liberal	Jason Aldworth	6,153	35.5	+3.2
Greens	Richard Nielsen	1,631	9.4	+9.4
Independent	Zanny Begg	541	3.1	+3.1
Independent	Guy McGhie	340	2.0	+2.0
Total formal votes		17,316	98.0	+0.5
Informal votes		357	2.0	−0.5
Turnout		17,673	87.3	
Two-party-preferred result
Labor	Peter Beattie	10,089	60.3	−4.6
Liberal	Jason Aldworth	6,649	39.7	+4.6
Labor hold		Swing	−4.6	

1992 Queensland state election: Brisbane Central
Party	Candidate	Votes	%	±%
Labor	Peter Beattie	10,946	58.7	−2.1
Liberal	Richard Roberts	6,030	32.3	+6.0
Independent	Susan Price	1,680	9.0	+9.0
Total formal votes		18,656	97.5	
Informal votes		477	2.5	
Turnout		19,133	87.3	
Two-party-preferred result
Labor	Peter Beattie	11,869	64.8	+1.9
Liberal	Richard Roberts	6,440	35.2	−1.9
Labor hold		Swing	+1.9	

=== Elections in the 1980s ===
1989 Queensland state election: Brisbane Central
Party	Candidate	Votes	%	±%
Labor	Peter Beattie	10,823	64.7	+14.5
Liberal	John Peeters	3,452	20.6	+1.8
National	Justin Choveaux	1,599	9.6	−15.1
Greens	Ranald McDonald	860	5.1	+5.1
Total formal votes		16,734	96.4	+0.7
Informal votes		630	3.6	−0.7
Turnout		17,364	84.1	−1.5
Two-party-preferred result
Labor	Peter Beattie	11,413	68.2	+9.1
Liberal	John Peeters	5,321	31.8	−9.1
Labor hold		Swing	+9.1	

1986 Queensland state election: Brisbane Central
Party	Candidate	Votes	%	±%
Labor	Brian Davis	7,894	50.2	−8.7
National	Peter Peters	3,899	24.8	+24.8
Liberal	Muriel Ward	2,955	18.8	−22.3
Independent	Anthony Kneipp	405	2.6	+2.6
Socialist	Jack Cotter	401	2.6	+2.6
Independent	Mark Gardener	181	1.2	+1.2
Total formal votes		15,735	95.7	
Informal votes		710	4.3	
Turnout		16,445	85.6	
Two-party-preferred result
Labor	Brian Davis	9,299	59.1	+0.2
National	Peter Peters	6,436	40.9	+40.9
Labor hold		Swing	+0.2	

1983 Queensland state election: Brisbane Central
Party	Candidate	Votes	%	±%
Labor	Brian Davis	8,164	58.9	+5.3
Liberal	Rodney Daniel	5,700	41.1	−0.2
Total formal votes		13,864	96.9	−0.3
Informal votes		447	3.1	+0.3
Turnout		14,311	88.7	+4.4
Labor hold		Swing	+1.2	

1980 Queensland state election: Brisbane Central
Party	Candidate	Votes	%	±%
Labor	Brian Davis	7,279	53.6	+0.9
Liberal	Robert Wright	5,604	41.3	−2.6
Communist	Murray Broad	699	5.2	+5.2
Total formal votes		13,582	97.2	−0.6
Informal votes		385	2.8	+0.6
Turnout		13,967	84.3	−4.0
Two-party-preferred result
Labor	Brian Davis	7,838	57.7	+2.3
Liberal	Robert Wright	5,744	42.3	−2.3
Labor hold		Swing	+2.3	

=== Elections in the 1970s ===
1977 Queensland state election: Brisbane Central
Party	Candidate	Votes	%	±%
Labor	Brian Davis	7,641	52.7	
Liberal	Dennis Young	6,359	43.9	
Socialist	Dennis Bailey	490	3.4	
Total formal votes		14,490	97.8	
Informal votes		329	2.2	
Turnout		14,819	88.3	
Two-party-preferred result
Labor	Brian Davis	8,033	55.4	+8.2
Liberal	Dennis Young	6,457	44.6	−8.2
Labor gain from Liberal		Swing	+8.2	
