= Electoral results for the district of McConnel =

Queensland, Australia, district election results

This is a list of electoral results for the electoral district of McConnel in Queensland state elections.

== Members for McConnel ==
Member	Party	Term
Grace Grace	Labor	2017–present

== Election results ==
=== Elections in the 2020s ===
2024 Queensland state election: McConnel
Party	Candidate	Votes	%	±%
Labor	Grace Grace	12,354	35.48	+0.18
Liberal National	Christien Duffey	12,153	34.90	+3.93
Greens	Holstein Wong	8,791	25.24	−2.91
One Nation	Gavin Jones	1,141	3.28	+1.84
Family First	Kirsty Sands	382	1.10	+1.10
Total formal votes		34,821	97.36	−0.02
Informal votes		943	2.64	+0.02
Turnout		35,764	84.68	−0.99
Two-party-preferred result
Labor	Grace Grace	20,458	58.75	−2.31
Liberal National	Christien Duffey	14,363	41.25	+2.31
Labor hold		Swing	−2.31	

2020 Queensland state election: McConnel
Party	Candidate	Votes	%	±%
Labor	Grace Grace	11,616	35.30	+1.62
Liberal National	Pinky Singh	10,192	30.97	−5.55
Greens	Kirsten Lovejoy	9,263	28.15	+1.04
Legalise Cannabis	Paul Swan	721	2.19	+2.19
One Nation	Anne Perry	474	1.44	+1.44
Independent	Miranda Bertram	236	0.72	+0.72
United Australia	Malcolm Wood	164	0.50	+0.50
Informed Medical Options	Alan Hamilton	152	0.46	+0.46
Independent	John Dobinson	93	0.28	−0.75
Total formal votes		32,911	97.38	+1.33
Informal votes		885	2.62	−1.33
Turnout		33,796	85.67	+4.10
Two-party-preferred result
Labor	Grace Grace	20,096	61.06	+3.20
Liberal National	Pinky Singh	12,815	38.94	−3.20
Labor hold		Swing	+3.20	

=== Elections in the 2010s ===
2017 Queensland state election: McConnel
Party	Candidate	Votes	%	±%
Liberal National	Jamie Forster	10,017	36.5	−5.5
Labor	Grace Grace	9,238	33.7	−2.5
Greens	Kirsten Lovejoy	7,436	27.1	+7.8
Independent	John Dobinson	283	1.0	+1.0
Independent	Edward Gilmour	242	0.9	+0.9
Independent	Kamala Emanuel	217	0.8	+0.8
Total formal votes		27,433	96.1	−2.3
Informal votes		1,128	3.9	+2.3
Turnout		28,561	81.6	+3.8
Two-party-preferred result
Labor	Grace Grace	15,874	57.9	+4.8
Liberal National	Jamie Forster	11,559	42.1	−4.8
Labor hold		Swing	+4.8	
