= 2014 Stafford state by-election =

- 19 July 2014
	First party	Second party	Third party
Candidate	Anthony Lynham	Bob Andersen	Anna Boccabella
Party	Labor	Liberal National	Greens
Popular vote	12,626	8,339	2,971
Percentage	50.6%	33.4%	11.9%
Swing	▲17.1	▼16.8	▲0.6
TPP	62.0%	38.0%
TPP swing	▲19.1	▼19.1
MP before election
Chris Davis
Liberal National
Elected MP
Anthony Lynham
Labor

A by-election was conducted for the Queensland Legislative Assembly seat of Stafford on 19 July 2014 following 23 May resignation of LNP MP Chris Davis. The LNP won Stafford from Labor at the 2012 election with 57.1 percent of the two-party vote from a 14.4-point two-party swing. The 2014 Redcliffe by-election saw a 17.2-point two-party swing to Labor. Analysts predicted a Labor win with a 10–12-point two-party swing. Labor candidate Anthony Lynham won the by-election with a 62 percent two-party vote from a 19.1-point two-party swing.

This election was the first in Australia which required voter identification to be shown prior to receiving a ballot paper.

== Key dates ==
- 19 June 2014: Issue of writ
- 25 June 2014: Close of electoral roll
- 3 July 2014: Close of nominations
- 7 July 2014: Pre-poll voting started
- 19 July 2014: Polling day
- 29 July 2014: Cut-off for return of postal votes
- 4 September 2014: Return of writ

== Nominations ==
The four candidates in ballot paper order were as follows:

Candidate nominations
Party	Candidate	Background
Liberal National Party	Bob Andersen	Psychologist for Queensland Health.
Family First Party	Sally-Anne Vincent	Accountant. Family First candidate for Sandgate in 2006, Murrumba in 2009 and 2012 and Redcliffe in 2014, federal seat of Petrie in 2007 and 2010, and Senate in 2013.
Queensland Greens	Anne Boccabella	Small businesswoman. Greens candidate for Brisbane Central in 2012, 2009 and 2007, and independent candidate for Mount Coot-tha in 2001.
Labor Party	Anthony Lynham	Oral and maxillofacial surgeon at the Royal Brisbane Hospital.

Katter's Australian Party, which received 4.9 percent in 2012, did not re-contest Stafford at the by-election. Clive Palmer initially said the Palmer United Party would run in the by-election, but then said it was undecided whether the party would field a candidate. A candidate was not fielded.

== Result ==
Queensland state by-election, 2014: Stafford
Party	Candidate	Votes	%	±%
Labor	Anthony Lynham	12,626	50.6	+17.1
Liberal National	Bob Andersen	8,339	33.4	−16.8
Greens	Anne Boccabella	2,971	11.9	+0.6
Family First	Sally-Anne Vincent	997	4.0	+4.0
Total formal votes		24,933	98.1	−0.0
Informal votes		485	1.9	+0.0
Turnout		25,418	81.5	−9.8
Two-party-preferred result
Labor	Anthony Lynham	14,562	62.0	+19.1
Liberal National	Bob Andersen	8,925	38.0	−19.1
Labor gain from Liberal National		Swing	+19.1	

The result saw the biggest swing at a Queensland by-election since changes to the 1992 Electoral Act.

== See also ==
- List of Queensland state by-elections
- 2026 Stafford state by-election
