= Electoral results for the district of Scenic Rim =

Queensland, Australia, district election results

This is a list of electoral results for the electoral district of Scenic Rim in Queensland state elections.

== Members for Scenic Rim ==
Member	Party	Term
Jon Krause	Liberal National	2017–present

== Election results ==
=== Elections in the 2020s ===
2024 Queensland state election: Scenic Rim
Party	Candidate	Votes	%	±%
Liberal National	Jon Krause	18,641	51.38	+3.88
Labor	Shireen Casey	7,744	21.34	−5.06
One Nation	Wayne Ziebarth	5,305	14.62	−0.38
Greens	Nicole Thompson	3,306	9.11	+1.21
Family First	Louise Austin	1,287	3.55	+3.55
Total formal votes		36,283	96.25	
Informal votes		1,415	3.75	
Turnout		37,698	89.69	
Two-party-preferred result
Liberal National	Jon Krause	23,987	66.11	+4.71
Labor	Shireen Casey	12,296	33.89	−4.71
Liberal National hold		Swing	+4.71	

2020 Queensland state election: Scenic Rim
Party	Candidate	Votes	%	±%
Liberal National	Jon Krause	15,592	47.47	+6.46
Labor	Luz Stanton	8,699	26.49	+4.99
One Nation	Paul Henselin	4,934	15.02	−12.57
Greens	Pietro Agnoletto	2,606	7.93	−1.97
Informed Medical Options	Deborah Husbands	700	2.13	+2.13
United Australia	Bradley Fowler	313	0.95	+0.95
Total formal votes		32,844	96.87	+0.75
Informal votes		1,061	3.13	−0.75
Turnout		33,905	89.51	−0.61
Two-party-preferred result
Liberal National	Jon Krause	20,182	61.45	+2.20
Labor	Luz Stanton	12,662	38.55	−2.20
Liberal National hold		Swing	+2.20	

=== Elections in the 2010s ===
2017 Queensland state election: Scenic Rim
Party	Candidate	Votes	%	±%
Liberal National	Jon Krause	12,878	41.0	−7.5
One Nation	Rod Smith	8,662	27.6	+19.0
Labor	Carolyn Buchan	6,748	21.5	−5.7
Greens	Shannon Girard	3,109	9.9	+1.7
Total formal votes		31,397	96.1	−1.8
Informal votes		1,267	3.9	+1.8
Turnout		32,664	90.1	+7.0
Two-candidate-preferred result
Liberal National	Jon Krause	19,819	63.1	+3.8
One Nation	Rod Smith	11,578	36.9	+36.9
Liberal National hold		Swing	+3.8	
