= Cavallucci (surname) =

Cavallucci is an Italian surname. Notable people with the surname include:

- Antonio Cavallucci (1752–1795), Italian painter
- Robert Cavallucci (born 1975), Australian politician
