= Palaszczuk shadow ministry =

The shadow ministry of Annastatcia Palaszczuk was the Labor opposition between March 2012 and February 2015, opposing the Newman government in the Parliament of Queensland. It was led by Annastacia Palaszczuk following her election as leader of the party and Opposition Leader on 28 March 2012. Tim Mulherin was the deputy party leader and Deputy Leader of the Opposition.

Following Labor's disastrous result at the 2012 state election, deputy party leader Leader Andrew Fraser lost his seat and Anna Bligh resigning as party leader. The Palaszczuk shadow ministry then succeeded the Bligh ministry as the Labor Party frontbench. Following Labor's victory at the 2015 state election, the shadow ministry transitioned into the First Palaszczuk ministry. The Springborg shadow ministry then succeeded the Palaszczuk shadow ministry as the new shadow cabinet of Queensland.

== Initial arrangement ==
The initial shadow ministry was announced on 19 April 2012, and changes were announced 10 days later to reflect the election of Jackie Trad at the South Brisbane by-election.

Portfolio	Shadow minister
Leader of the Opposition; Shadow Minister for Justice and Attorney-General; Shadow Minister for Justice; Shadow Minister for Industrial Relations; Shadow Minister for Education, Training and Employment; Shadow Minister for Tourism, Major Events and Commonwealth Games	Annastacia Palaszczuk
Deputy Leader of the Opposition; Shadow Minister for State Development, Infrastructure, Planning and Racing; Shadow Minister for Agriculture, Fisheries and Forestry; Shadow Minister for Local Government; Shadow Minister for Science, IT and Innovation	Tim Mulherin
Leader of Opposition Business; Shadow Minister for Treasury and Trade; Shadow Minister for Energy and Water Supply; Shadow Minister for Main Roads; Shadow Minister for Aboriginal and Torres Strait Islander Partnerships; Shadow Minister for Sport and Recreation	Curtis Pitt
Opposition Whip; Shadow Minister for Health; Shadow Minister for Natural Resources and Mines; Shadow Minister for Housing	Jo-Ann Miller
Deputy Opposition Whip; Shadow Minister for Disability Services, Community Services, for Child Safety, Multicultural Affairs and Women; Shadow Minister for Mental Health	Desley Scott
Shadow Minister for Police, Corrective Services and Emergency Services; Shadow Minister for Construction and Public Works; Shadow Minister for National Parks	Bill Byrne
Shadow Minister for Transport; Shadow Minister for Environment and Heritage Protection; Shadow Minister for Small Business; Shadow Minister for Consumer Affairs and the Arts	Jackie Trad

== Final arrangement ==
On February 22, 2014, Yvette D'Ath won the ALP's eighth seat at the Redcliffe by-election and she was given a place in the Shadow Ministry. On July 18, 2014, Anthony Lynham won the ALP's ninth seat at the Stafford by-election and eventually given a place in the Shadow Ministry.

Portfolio	Shadow Minister
Leader of the Opposition; Shadow Minister for Employment and Industrial Relations	Annastacia Palaszczuk
Deputy Leader of the Opposition; Shadow Minister for State Development, Infrastructure and Planning; Shadow Minister for Racing; Shadow Minister for Local Government; Shadow Minister for Tourism, Major Events and Commonwealth Games	Tim Mulherin
Leader of Opposition Business; Shadow Minister for Treasury and Trade; Shadow Minister for Energy and Water Supply; Shadow Minister for Aboriginal and Torres Strait Islander Partnerships	Curtis Pitt
Opposition Whip; Shadow Minister for Health; Shadow Minister for Natural Resources and Mines	Jo-Ann Miller
Deputy Opposition Whip; Shadow Minister for Community Services and Child Safety; Shadow Minister for Mental Health; Shadow Minister for Multicultural Affairs; Shadow Minister for Women and Seniors	Desley Scott
Shadow Minister for Police, Corrective Services and Emergency Services; Shadow Minister for Construction and Public Works; Shadow Minister for National Parks; Shadow Minister for Sport and Recreation	Bill Byrne
Shadow Minister for Transport and Main Roads; Shadow Minister for Environment and Heritage Protection; Shadow Minister for Small Business and Consumer Affairs; Shadow Minister for The Arts	Jackie Trad
Shadow Minister for Justice and Attorney-General; Shadow Minister for Training; Shadow Minister for Disability Services; Shadow Minister for Housing	Yvette D'Ath
Shadow Minister for Education; Shadow Minister for Science, IT and Innovation; Shadow Minister for Primary Industries and Fisheries; Shadow Minister Assisting the Leader on the Public Service	Anthony Lynham

== See also ==
- First Palaszczuk Ministry
- Bligh Ministry
- Opposition (Queensland)
- Newman Ministry
