= 2026 Stafford state by-election =

By-election in Queensland, Australia

- 16 May 2026

Electoral district of Stafford in the Queensland Legislative Assembly
- Registered: 41,397
- Turnout: 33,792 (81.6% ▼8.6)

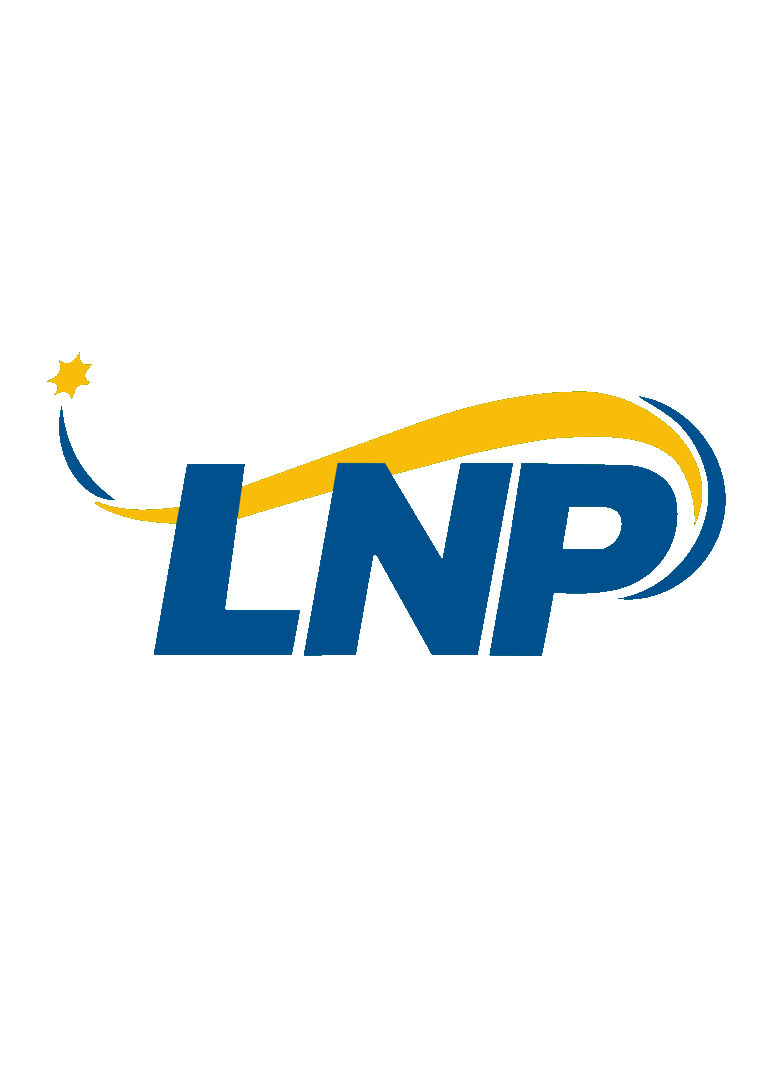

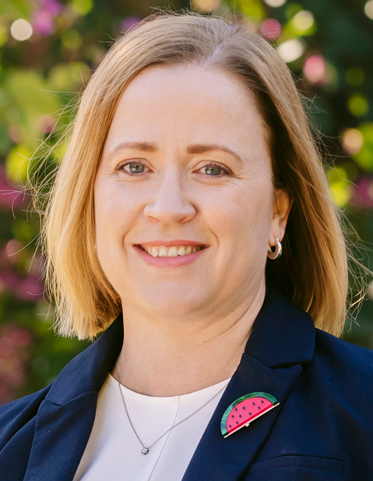
	First party	Second party	Third party
Candidate	Luke Richmond	Fiona Hammond	Jess Lane
Party	Labor	Liberal National	Greens
Primary vote	10,034	13,146	4,777
Percentage	30.8%	40.3%	14.7%
Swing	▼7.9 pp	▲2.3 pp	▼3.4 pp
TPP	16,738	15,852
TPP %	51.4%	48.6%
TPP swing	▼4.0 pp	▲4.0 pp
MP before election
Jimmy Sullivan
Independent
Elected MP
Luke Richmond
Labor

A state by-election for the seat of Stafford in the Queensland Legislative Assembly was held on 16 May 2026, following the death of independent MP Jimmy Sullivan on 9 April 2026. The seat was won by Queensland Labor Party candidate Luke Richmond, who held the seat for the party despite conceding a swing of approximately 4% on the two-party preferred vote.

== Background ==
=== Incumbent member of parliament ===
Sullivan had served as the member for Stafford since retaining the seat for the Labor Party at the 2020 state election. He held the seat at the 2024 state election despite suffering a 6.6% swing against him on the two-party-preferred vote (TPP). Shortly thereafter Sullivan was investigated by the Queensland Police Service over an alleged domestic incident, and in May 2025 he was expelled from the Labor Party caucus due to failing to adhere to "a safe return to work plan" as described by party leader Steven Miles, and as domestic allegations were levelled against Sullivan. He served the remainder of his term as an independent MP on the crossbench, and died in office on 9 April 2026, with his death treated as "not suspicious" by police who discovered his body in his home.

=== Seat details ===
The district or seat of Stafford is located in the northern suburbs of Brisbane, and incorporates the suburbs of Stafford, Gordon Park, Grange, Kedron, Stafford Heights, and parts of Chermside, Chermside West, McDowall, Alderley, Wilston, Newmarket and Windsor. Since its reincarnation as a seat in 2001, Stafford has usually been a fairly safe seat for the centre-left Labor Party, which has won the seat at every election with at least 55% of the TPP vote, with the exception of the landslide 2012 state election won by the centre-right to right-wing Liberal National Party (LNP). Labor and the LNP had always finished in the top two positions on the primary vote in the seat, and the Greens regularly registered primary votes of around 17%.

=== 2024 election results ===
2024 Queensland state election: Stafford
Party	Candidate	Votes	%	±%
Labor	Jimmy Sullivan	13,856	38.77	−6.83
Liberal National	Fiona Hammond	13,605	38.06	+6.16
Greens	Jess Lane	6,456	18.06	+1.66
One Nation	Stuart Andrews	1,134	3.17	+0.17
Family First	Alan Denaro	692	1.94	+1.94
Total formal votes		35,743	97.36	
Informal votes		971	2.64	
Turnout		36,714	90.23	
Two-party-preferred result
Labor	Jimmy Sullivan	19,774	55.32	−6.58
Liberal National	Fiona Hammond	15,969	44.68	+6.58
Labor hold		Swing	–6.58	

== Key dates ==
Key dates in relation to the by-election are:

- 17 April 2026: Issue of the writ
- 21 April 2026: Close of electoral roll
- 24 April 2026: Close of candidate nominations
- 5 May 2026: Early voting commences
- 16 May 2026: Polling day
- 9 July 2026: Last day for the return of the writ

== Candidates ==
Candidates are listed in ballot order.

Party	Candidate	Background
Labor	Luke Richmond	Assistant secretary of Queensland Labor.
Legalise Cannabis	Jacqueline Verne	Medicinal cannabis patient.
Independent People First	Damian Smart	
Libertarian	Daniel Selff	Mathematics teacher.
Independent Socialist	Liam Parry	Activist and University of Queensland student.
Greens	Jess Lane	School teacher and third-placing candidate at the 2024 election.
Animal Justice	Lucy O'Brien	Kindergarten Director & Teacher.
Family First	Alan Denaro	Small business owner, and fifth-placing candidate at the 2024 election.
Liberal National	Fiona Hammond	Former councillor and second-placing candidate at the 2024 election.

The Labor candidate for Stafford was the party's assistant state secretary, Luke Richmond. The Liberal candidate is Fiona Hammond, a former councillor who contested the seat at the 2024 state election. Liam Parry stood for the Queensland Socialists. Damian Smart contested the election on behalf of Gerard Rennick People First. Both Queensland Socialists and People First lacked state-registered party recognition, and thus nominated their candidates as independents. Jess Lane, a school teacher endorsed by the Queensland Greens who stood for the seat at the 2024 state election, again contested the seat.

The One Nation party did not run a candidate, despite polling highly in national polls and at several recent elections, including the Farrer federal by-election, Nepean state by-election and South Australian state election. Party officials stated they intended to focus their efforts on the 2028 state election.

== Results ==
2026 Stafford state by-election
Party	Candidate	Votes	%	±%
Liberal National	Fiona Hammond	13,146	40.34	+2.27
Labor	Luke Richmond	10,034	30.79	−7.98
Greens	Jess Lane	4,777	14.66	−3.40
Independent	Liam Parry	1,244	3.82	+3.82
Legalise Cannabis	Jacqueline Verne	960	2.95	+2.95
Family First	Alan Denaro	767	2.35	+0.42
Animal Justice	Lucy O’Brien	680	2.09	+2.09
Independent	Damian Smart	612	1.88	+1.88
Libertarian	Daniel Selff	370	1.14	+1.14
Total formal votes		32,590	96.44	−0.91
Informal votes		1,202	3.56	+0.91
Turnout		33,792	81.63	−8.60
Registered electors		41,397		
Two-candidate-preferred result
Labor	Luke Richmond	16,738	51.36	−3.96
Liberal National	Fiona Hammond	15,852	48.64	+3.96
Labor hold		Swing	−3.96	

== See also ==
- List of Queensland state by-elections
- 2014 Stafford state by-election
