= Luke Richmond =

Australian politician

Luke Richmond MP

Member of the Queensland Legislative Assembly for Stafford
- Incumbent
- Assumed office 16 May 2026
- Preceded by: Jimmy Sullivan

Personal details
- Party: Labor

Luke Richmond is an Australian politician, and has represented the district of Stafford in the Legislative Assembly of Queensland since a 2026 by-election. Richmond is a member of the Australian Labor Party, and prior to his election was assistant state secretary of the Labor Party's Queensland branch.

== Career ==
Richmond is a lawyer.

In advance of the 2024 Queensland state election, Richmond was appointed as deputy chief of staff to premier and Labor leader Steven Miles. Prior to this, he had been chief of staff to Shannon Fentiman.

In late 2025, Richmond was made the assistant state secretary of Queensland Labor at the party's conference. Richmond was the candidate of the Right faction, and was the coordinator for campaign and strategy at the Australian Workers' Union when he took the role.

Following the death of independent MP Jimmy Sullivan (who had formerly been a Labor MP before his removal from caucus in 2025), Richmond was selected as the Labor candidate for the by-election in Sullivan's district of Stafford. Despite a swing against Labor in the by-election, Richmond defeated Liberal National candidate Fiona Hammond and was elected to the Queensland Legislative Assembly.

== Early life ==
Richmond attended Padua College (Brisbane).

Parliament of Queensland
Preceded by Jimmy Sullivan	Member for Stafford; 2026–present	Incumbent
