= Kev Lingard =

Australian politician

Kevin Lingard

Manager of Opposition Business in Queensland
- In office 12 March 2001 – 29 January 2007
- Leader: Mike Horan; Lawrence Springborg; Jeff Seeney
- Preceded by: Denver Beanland
- Succeeded by: Stuart Copeland

Minister for Families, Youth and Community Care
- In office 26 February 1996 – 13 February 1998
- Premier: Rob Borbidge
- Preceded by: Margaret Woodgate (Family and Community Services); Tom Burns (Youth)
- Succeeded by: Naomi Wilson

Deputy Leader of the Queensland National Party
- In office 29 September 1992 – 13 February 1998
- Leader: Rob Borbidge
- Preceded by: Brian Littleproud
- Succeeded by: Mike Horan

Speaker of the Queensland Legislative Assembly
- In office 5 July 1989 – 2 November 1989
- Preceded by: Lin Powell
- Succeeded by: Jim Fouras
- In office 17 February 1987 – 24 November 1987
- Preceded by: John Warner
- Succeeded by: Lin Powell

Minister for Environment and Health
- In office 25 November 1987 – 1 December 1987
- Premier: Joh Bjelke-Petersen
- Preceded by: Mike Ahern
- Succeeded by: Leisha Harvey (Health); Geoff Muntz (Environment)

Member of the Queensland Legislative Assembly for Beaudesert Fassifern (1983–1992)
- In office 22 October 1983 – 20 March 2009
- Preceded by: Selwyn Muller
- Succeeded by: Aidan McLindon

Personal details
- Born: Kevin Rowson Lingard; 14 August 1942 (age 84) Miles, Queensland
- Party: Liberal National Party
- Other political affiliations: The Nationals
- Occupation: High School Principal, sport commentator

Kevin Rowson "Kev" Lingard (born 14 August 1942) is an Australian former politician. He was a National Party (Liberal National from 2008 onwards) member of the Legislative Assembly of Queensland from 1983 to 2009 and a former Deputy Leader of the Nationals in Queensland. Before entering politics, Lingard represented Queensland in both rugby league and rugby union.

== Political career ==
Lingard first entered state parliament as the member for Fassifern at the 1983 state election. He held the seat until its abolition at the 1992 state election, upon which he won the replacement seat of Beaudesert. He remained the member for Beaudesert until his retirement at the 2009 state election.

Lingard served as Speaker of the Legislative Assembly of Queensland from February to November 1987. He resigned the Speakership to accept the position of Minister for Health and Environment in the dying days of the Joh Bjelke-Petersen premiership. He held the job for just a week, until Mike Ahern became Premier of Queensland on 1 December 1987, and Lingard was not included in the ministry. Lingard again became Speaker in September 1989, retaining the position until November that year, when his party lost the 1989 state election.

Lingard served as Deputy Leader of the National Party from 1992 to 1998. When the National Party returned to government in 1996, Lingard was appointed Minister for Families, Youth and Community Care under the premiership of Rob Borbidge. He retained the portfolio until he was fired by Borbidge in February 1998 for a "clerical error", a $538 dinner claim made by his then senior policy adviser, Wendy Howard, in August 1996. The claim was rejected by the Treasury department - Lingard was one of eight people who attended the dinner.

At the March 2009 state election, Lingard retired as the member for Beaudesert and was replaced as Liberal National Party candidate by Aidan McLindon.

== Personal life ==
Lingard was born in the Queensland town of Miles. He is married with two daughters and one son.

Parliament of Queensland
Preceded by John Warner	Speaker of the Legislative Assembly; 1987	Succeeded by Lin Powell
Preceded by Lin Powell	Speaker of the Legislative Assembly; 1989	Succeeded by Jim Fouras
Preceded by Selwyn Muller	Member for Fassifern; 1983–1992	Abolished
New seat	Member for Beaudesert; 1992–2009	Succeeded by Aidan McLindon
