= Chris Davis (politician) =

Australian politician (born 1953)

Assistant Minister for Health
- In office 3 April 2012 – 13 May 2014
- Minister: Lawrence Springborg
- Premier: Campbell Newman
- Preceded by: Julie Attwood
- Succeeded by: Nikki Boyd (2020)

Member of the Queensland Legislative Assembly for Stafford
- In office 24 March 2012 – 23 May 2014
- Preceded by: Stirling Hinchliffe
- Succeeded by: Anthony Lynham

Personal details
- Born: Christopher Karl Davis; 13 October 1953 (age 73) Cape Town, South Africa
- Party: Independent (since 2014); Liberal National Party (2011-2014)
- Spouse: Katharine Sinclair
- Education: University of Cape Town
- Profession: Physician

Christopher Karl Davis (born 13 October 1953) is a former Australian Liberal National politician who was the member of the Legislative Assembly of Queensland for Stafford, having defeated Stirling Hinchliffe at the 2012 state election until he resigned in May 2014. He was appointed Assistant Minister for Health on 3 April 2012, but was expelled from the ministry for breaches of cabinet solidarity.

Davis worked as the director of geriatric medicine at The Prince Charles Hospital. He has served as president of the Queensland branch of the Australian Medical Association and was the state chair of the Royal Australasian College of Physicians.

On 13 May 2014, Davis was sacked from Cabinet in response to his speaking against the government on a number of matters. Premier Campbell Newman said Davis had failed to observe the convention that cabinet members and assistant ministers are bound by collective decision making. Although Davis initially stated that he intended to retire at the next state election, he resigned from the Parliament on 23 May 2014. A 2014 Stafford by-election was held on Saturday 19 July 2014.

On 25 July 2014, in an interview on the ABC's 7.30 Queensland, Davis stated that he had resigned from the Liberal National Party and had spoken to Labor state secretary Anthony Chisholm about the potential for continuing his political career with Labor, potentially running in Newman's seat of Ashgrove. The following day, Leader of the Opposition Annastacia Palaszczuk stated that Davis was not a member of the Labor Party and would not be running as a Labor candidate. On the same day, Davis submitted his application to join the Labor Party, and also stated that he was interested in federal politics if he was unsuccessful in obtaining a state seat.

Parliament of Queensland
Preceded by Stirling Hinchliffe	Member for Stafford; 2012–2014	Succeeded by Anthony Lynham
