= Electoral district of Scenic Rim =

State electoral district of Queensland, Australia

Scenic Rim Queensland—Legislative Assembly
- Map of the electoral district of Scenic Rim, 2017
- State: Queensland
- Dates current: 2017–present
- MP: Jon Krause
- Party: Liberal National Party
- Namesake: Scenic Rim
- Electors: 37,878 (2020)
- Area: 4,809 km^{2} (1,856.8 sq mi)
- Demographic: Rural
- Coordinates: 28.0667°S 152.8008°E
Electorates around Scenic Rim:
Ipswich West	Ipswich; Jordan	Logan; Coomera
Lockyer	Scenic Rim	Theodore
Southern Downs	New South Wales	Mudgeeraba

Scenic Rim is an electoral district of the Legislative Assembly in the Australian state of Queensland. It was created in the 2017 redistribution, and was won at the 2017 election by Jon Krause.

Located in South-East Queensland, Scenic Rim covers the Scenic Rim Region and some areas in the south of Ipswich and Logan extending to the New South Wales border, including the towns of Beaudesert and Boonah. It largely replaces the abolished district of Beaudesert.

From results of the 2015 election, Scenic Rim was estimated to be a fairly safe seat for the Liberal National Party with a margin of 9.2%.

== Members for Scenic Rim ==
Member	Party	Term
Jon Krause	Liberal National	2017–present

== Election results ==
2024 Queensland state election: Scenic Rim
Party	Candidate	Votes	%	±%
Liberal National	Jon Krause	18,641	51.38	+3.88
Labor	Shireen Casey	7,744	21.34	−5.06
One Nation	Wayne Ziebarth	5,305	14.62	−0.38
Greens	Nicole Thompson	3,306	9.11	+1.21
Family First	Louise Austin	1,287	3.55	+3.55
Total formal votes		36,283	96.25	
Informal votes		1,415	3.75	
Turnout		37,698	89.69	
Two-party-preferred result
Liberal National	Jon Krause	23,987	66.11	+4.71
Labor	Shireen Casey	12,296	33.89	−4.71
Liberal National hold		Swing	+4.71	

== See also ==
- Electoral districts of Queensland
- Members of the Queensland Legislative Assembly by year
- Category:Members of the Queensland Legislative Assembly by name
