= Electoral district of McConnel =

State electoral district of Queensland, Australia

McConnel Queensland—Legislative Assembly
- Map of the electoral district of McConnel, 2017
- State: Queensland
- Dates current: 2017–present
- MP: Grace Grace
- Party: Labor Party
- Namesake: Mary McConnel
- Electors: 39,448 (2020)
- Area: 13 km^{2} (5.0 sq mi)
- Demographic: Inner-metropolitan
- Coordinates: 27.4569°S 153.034°E
Electorates around McConnel:
Stafford	Clayfield	Clayfield
Cooper	McConnel	Bulimba
South Brisbane	South Brisbane	Bulimba

McConnel is an electoral district of the Legislative Assembly in the Australian state of Queensland. It was created in the 2017 redistribution as essentially a reconfigured version of Brisbane Central.

It covers the Brisbane CBD, as well as the suburbs of Kelvin Grove, Herston, Bowen Hills, Newstead, Teneriffe, Fortitude Valley, Spring Hill, Petrie Terrace and New Farm.

It is named after Mary McConnel, one of Queensland's early European settlers, who came to Queensland in 1849. With her husband David McConnel, they ran the Cressbrook pastoral station. Mary McConnel was a close friend of Diamantina Bowen, the wife of the first Queensland Governor George Bowen, and together with a committee of ladies, they embarked on a program of building hospitals for women and children, such as the Lady Bowen Hospital which provided maternity services. After the Bowens left Queensland, Mary McConnel continued to raise funding to build a children's hospital. The Hospital for Sick Children in Brisbane was opened on 11 March 1878.

From results of the last election, McConnel is estimated to be a marginal seat for the Labor Party with a margin of 3.1%. Grace Grace, the last member for Brisbane Central, transferred to McConnel and won with a modest swing.

The electorate containing what is now the Brisbane CBD has been known variously as Town of Brisbane (1859–1873), Brisbane City (1873–1878), North Brisbane (1878–1888), Brisbane North (1888–1912), Brisbane (1912–1977) and Brisbane Central (1977–2017).

== Members for McConnel ==
Member	Party	Term
Grace Grace	Labor	2017–present

== Election results ==
2024 Queensland state election: McConnel
Party	Candidate	Votes	%	±%
Labor	Grace Grace	12,354	35.48	+0.18
Liberal National	Christien Duffey	12,153	34.90	+3.93
Greens	Holstein Wong	8,791	25.24	−2.91
One Nation	Gavin Jones	1,141	3.28	+1.84
Family First	Kirsty Sands	382	1.10	+1.10
Total formal votes		34,821	97.36	−0.02
Informal votes		943	2.64	+0.02
Turnout		35,764	84.68	−0.99
Two-party-preferred result
Labor	Grace Grace	20,458	58.75	−2.31
Liberal National	Christien Duffey	14,363	41.25	+2.31
Labor hold		Swing	−2.31	

== See also ==
- Electoral districts of Queensland
- Members of the Queensland Legislative Assembly by year
- Category:Members of the Queensland Legislative Assembly by name
