= 2012 South Brisbane state by-election =

- 28 April 2012

Electoral district of South Brisbane in the Queensland Legislative Assembly
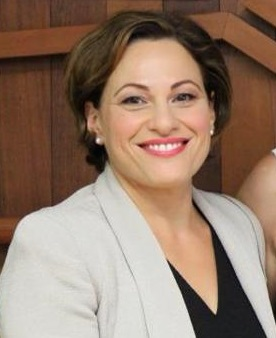

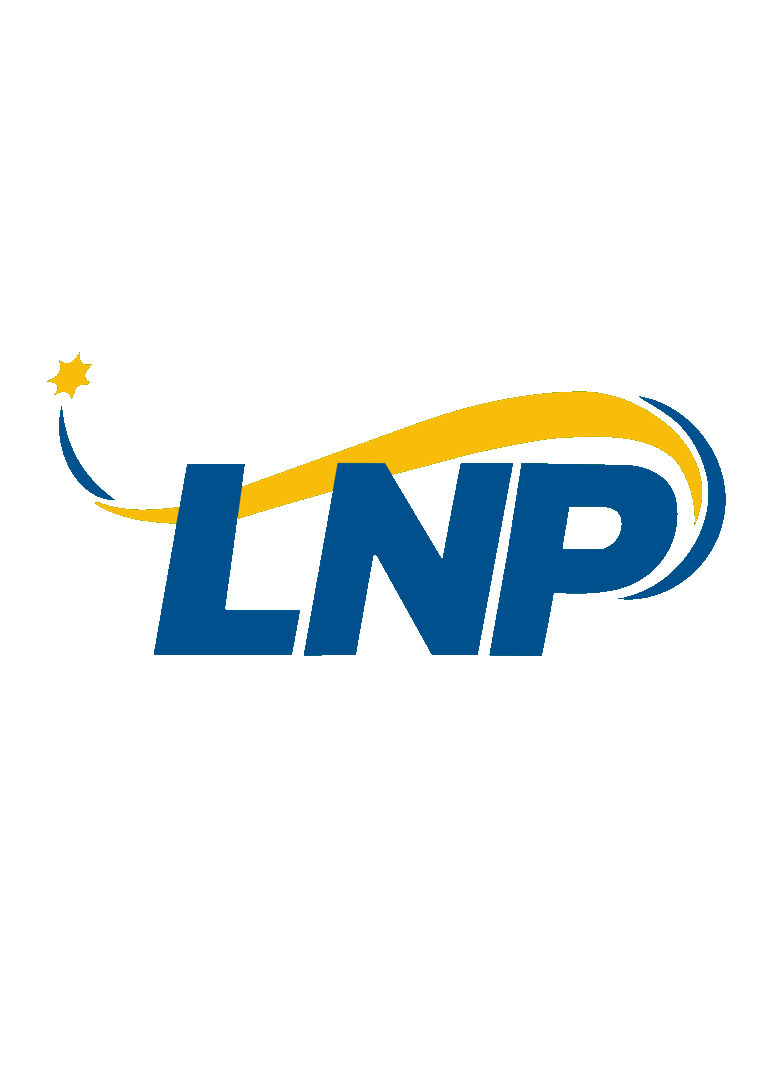

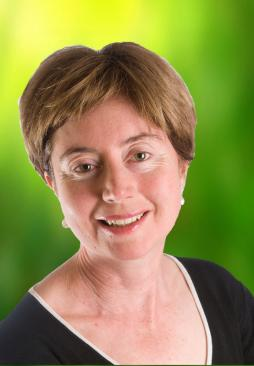
	First party	Second party	Third party
Candidate	Jackie Trad	Clem Grehan	Jo-Anne Bragg
Party	Labor	Liberal National	Greens
Primary vote	6,720	7,761	3,960
Percentage	32.9%	38.0%	19.4%
Swing	▼5.7pp	▼0.1pp	▲1.3pp
TPP	51.7%	48.3%
TPP swing	▼3.0pp	▲3.0pp
MP before election
Anna Bligh
Labor
Elected MP
Jackie Trad
Labor

The 2012 South Brisbane state by-election was held on 28 April 2012 to elect the member for South Brisbane in the Queensland Legislative Assembly, following the resignation of Labor Party MP and former premier Anna Bligh. It was held on the same day as the statewide local government elections.

Jackie Trad retained the seat for Labor.

== Background ==
Anna Bligh first entered the Parliament of Queensland as the Labor member for the seat of South Brisbane at the 1995 state election. She became leader of the party and Premier of Queensland following the resignation of Peter Beattie in 2007.

Bligh retained her seat at the 2012 state election with a 38.6 percent primary vote, a reduction of 9.8 points, and 55.0 percent of the two-party preferred vote, a reduction of 10.0 points. Statewide, Labor suffered a landslide defeat retaining only seven of 89 seats. Bligh immediately resigned as both premier and party leader, and on 30 March 2012 resigned from Parliament.

== Dates ==
Bligh intended the resignation to be timed so as to allow a by-election to be held on 28 April 2012, the same day as local government elections, but said she would understand if the new government chose a different day. Later, a question emerged over whether her resignation could be effective on 30 March as she was not formally in possession of the seat. But on 2 April, she was declared the winner, and a writ was subsequently issued for the by-election.

Date	Event
3 April 2012	Writ of election issued by the governor
7 April 2012	Close of electoral rolls
11 April 2012	Close of nominations
28 April 2012	Polling day, between the hours of 8 am and 6 pm
28 May 2012	Last day for writ to be returned and results formally declared

== Candidates ==
The declared candidates, in ballot paper order, were as follows:

Candidate nominations
Independent	Jason McKenzie	Employed with an accounting and consulting firm. Former employee with News Limited.
Daylight Saving for South East Queensland	Penny Panorea	Owns a design studio and art house cafe.
Family First Party	Penny McCreery	Business and law student.
Queensland Greens	Jo-Anne Bragg^{*}	Environmental and resources non-profit legal centre Director. Contested 2008 Brisbane Lord Mayoralty.
Liberal National Party of Queensland	Clem Grehan^{*}	Infrastructure project manager.
Independent	Liam Flenady^{*}	Endorsed candidate of the unregistered Socialist Alliance. Musician and political activist.
Labor Party	Jackie Trad	Former adviser to the Beattie and Bligh governments and Queensland Labor's Assistant State Secretary.
Katter's Australian Party	Robert Wardrop^{*}	Owns a concrete formworks manufacturing company.

^{*} Candidate contested South Brisbane at the 2012 state election.

The LNP candidate was Clem Grehan who stood against Bligh at the general election when he substantially slashed her majority. Grehan gained further ground in the by-election but was not enough to win the seat.

Despite coming close to winning South Brisbane in this by-election he did not run again for the LNP in the seat at the 2015 election.

== Results ==
The results of the election were:

South Brisbane state by-election, 28 April 2012
Party	Candidate	Votes	%	±%
Liberal National	Clem Grehan	7,761	38.0	–0.1
Labor	Jackie Trad	6,720	32.9	–5.7
Greens	Jo-Anne Bragg	3,960	19.4	+1.3
DS4SEQ	Penny Panorea	751	3.7	+3.7
Katter's Australian	Robert Wardrop	435	2.1	–1.3
Independent	Jason McKenzie	349	1.7	+1.7
Family First	Penny McCreery	261	1.3	+1.3
Ind. Socialist Alliance	Liam Flenady	189	0.9	–1.0
Total formal votes		20,426	98.2	+0.2
Informal votes		383	1.8	–0.2
Turnout		20,809	67.5	–19.6
Two-party-preferred result
Labor	Jackie Trad	8,963	51.7	–3.0
Liberal National	Clem Grehan	8,388	48.3	+3.0
Labor hold		Swing	–3.0	

== See also ==
- List of Queensland state by-elections
