= Jimmy Sullivan (Queensland politician) =

Australian politician (1982–2026)

Assistant Minister for Justice and Veterans' Affairs of Queensland
- In office 18 December 2023 – 28 October 2024
- Premier: Steven Miles
- Preceded by: Bart Mellish (Veterans' Affairs)
- Succeeded by: Janelle Poole

Member of the Queensland Legislative Assembly for Stafford
- In office 31 October 2020 – 9 April 2026
- Preceded by: Anthony Lynham
- Succeeded by: Luke Richmond

Personal details
- Born: James Anthony Sullivan; 5 January 1982
- Died: 9 April 2026 (aged 44) Stafford, Queensland, Australia
- Party: Labor (before 2025); Independent (2025–2026)
- Parent: Terry Sullivan (father)
- Website: Official website

James Anthony Sullivan (5 January 1982 – 9 April 2026) was an Australian politician who served as the member for Stafford in the Queensland Legislative Assembly from 2020 until his death in 2026.

== Early life ==
James Anthony Sullivan was the son of Terry Sullivan who served as the member for Stafford from 2001 to 2006, and attended Padua College.

== Political career ==
Prior to his election to Stafford at the 2020 Queensland state election, Sullivan studied at the University of Queensland, worked as an Associate to a Judge of the District Court of Queensland, and in various government roles including as chief of staff to the Attorney-General of Queensland, Yvette D'Ath.

As MP for Stafford, Sullivan was promoted to Assistant Minister for Justice and Veterans' Affairs by then-premier Steven Miles after the 2023 Queensland Labor Party leadership election. He served in this position until the state election on 26 October 2024.

He was a member of the Parliamentary Crime and Corruption Committee and also the Education, Employment and Training Committee from 2020 to 2024.

He was re-elected as the member for Stafford on a 55.3% two-party-preferred vote, albeit suffering a 6.6% swing to his challenger Fiona Hammond, a long serving councillor for the Marchant Ward.

== Personal life and death ==
Shortly after the 2024 Queensland state election, the Queensland Police Service were called to Sullivan's home due to an alleged domestic incident, though he was not arrested or charged with a crime. A Queensland Police application to impose a domestic violence order against Sullivan was dismissed by a magistrate. On 12 May 2025, Sullivan was expelled from the Labor Party caucus as a result of a failure to adhere to a safe return to work plan put in place by the party. Sullivan stated in parliament that at the time of the alleged incident he was suffering from post-traumatic stress sparked by the birth of his second daughter, noting his first daughter had died.

Sullivan was found dead at his home in Stafford, Brisbane, on 9 April 2026. He was 44. A funeral was held at Little Flower Church, Kedron.

Parliament of Queensland
Preceded by Anthony Lynham	Member for Stafford; 2020–2026	Succeeded by Luke Richmond
