= Anthony Lynham =

Australian politician and an oral and maxillofacial surgeon

The Honourable Anthony Lynham AO

Minister for Energy of Queensland
- In office 12 December 2017 – 31 October 2020
- Premier: Annastacia Palaszczuk
- Preceded by: Mark Bailey
- Succeeded by: Mick de Brenni

Minister for Natural Resources and Mines of Queensland
- In office 16 February 2015 – 31 October 2020
- Premier: Annastacia Palaszczuk
- Preceded by: Andrew Cripps
- Succeeded by: Scott Stewart

Minister for State Development of Queensland
- In office 16 February 2015 – 12 December 2017
- Premier: Annastacia Palaszczuk
- Preceded by: Jeff Seeney
- Succeeded by: Cameron Dick
Opposition portfolios
Shadow Minister for Primary Industries and Fisheries
In office 5 August 2014 – 16 February 2015
Leader	Annastacia Palaszczuk
Preceded by	Tim Mulherin
Succeeded by	Deb Frecklington
Shadow Minister for Education, Science, IT and Innovation
In office 5 August 2014 – 16 February 2015
Leader	Annastacia Palaszczuk
Preceded by	Yvette D'Ath
Succeeded by	Tim Mander (Education); John McVeigh (Science, IT and Innovation)

Member of the Queensland Parliament for Stafford
- In office 19 July 2014 – 31 October 2020
- Preceded by: Chris Davis
- Succeeded by: Jimmy Sullivan

Personal details
- Born: Anthony Joseph Lynham; 12 April 1960 (age 66) Brisbane, Queensland, Australia
- Party: Labor
- Education: University of Queensland; University of Newcastle
- Profession: Oral and maxillofacial surgeon

Anthony Joseph Lynham AO (born 12 April 1960) is an Australian politician who was a Labor Party member of the Legislative Assembly of Queensland representing the electoral district of Stafford from 2014 to 2020. He was the Queensland Minister for Natural Resources, Mines and Energy. Lynham was an oral and maxillofacial surgeon.

== Dental and Medical career ==
Lynham is a former oral and maxillofacial surgeon who was a consultant surgeon at the Royal Brisbane and Women's Hospital. He also was a member of the hospital trauma team. He graduated in dentistry from University of Queensland and medicine from Newcastle University. He holds a general fellowship from the Royal College of Surgeons Edinburgh. Further training was completed in Switzerland. One of his roles was the training of oral and maxillofacial surgeons both at the college and hospital level. He is an active researcher and has published regularly. He is an associate professor at the University of Queensland and an adjunct professor at the Queensland University of Technology.

== Political career ==
Lynham was first elected on 19 July 2014 at the Stafford by-election, which resulted from the resignation of former member Chris Davis, defeating the Liberal National candidate Bob Andersen with a 62 percent two-party vote from a 19-point two-party-preferred swing. Lynham then entered the Shadow Cabinet.

=== Palaszczuk government ===
On 16 February 2015, he was sworn in as Minister for State Development and Minister for Natural Resources and Mines in the Palaszczuk Ministry.

On 10 September 2020, Lynham announced he would retire from the Queensland Parliament and not contest the seat of Stafford in the 2020 election.

== Honours and recognition ==
Lynham was appointed as an Officer of the Order of Australia (AO) in the 2026 Australia Day Honours for "distinguished service to trauma medicine as an oral and maxillofacial surgeon, to the Parliament of Queensland, and to the community".

Parliament of Queensland
Preceded by Chris Davis	Member for Stafford; 2014–2020	Succeeded by Jimmy Sullivan
Political offices
Preceded by Jeff Seeney	Minister for State Development; 2014–2017	Succeeded by Cameron Dick
Preceded by Andrew Cripps	Minister for Natural Resources and Mines; 2014–2020	Succeeded by Scott Stewart
