= The Queensland Party =

- Leader: Aidan McLindon
- Founded: May 2010
- Registered: August 2010
- Dissolved: March 2012
- Split from: Liberal National Party
- Merged into: Katter's Australian Party
- Ideology: Regionalism; Agrarianism; Social conservatism
- Political position: Centre-right
- Colours: Maroon
- Queensland Legislative Assembly: 1 / 89 (2010–2011)

Website
- queenslandparty.org.au

The Queensland Party was a political party based in Queensland, Australia. It was registered with the Electoral Commission of Queensland between August 2010 and March 2012. The Queensland Party was formed by Aidan McLindon, the Member for Beaudesert, after he resigned from the Liberal National Party in May, 2010.

The Queensland Party had one Member of Parliament in the Legislative Assembly of Queensland and its signature policy was the re-instatement of the Upper House in Queensland. On 24 May 2011, Aidan McLindon tabled the first bill to restore Queensland's Upper House since it was abolished in 1922.

The Queensland Party was not affiliated with the North Queensland Party.

== Candidates ==
The Queensland Party claimed to have endorsed candidates for almost one-third of the 89 seats in Queensland Parliament. A number of candidates had been elected or had contested elections as members of the ALP and LNP. Peter Pyke (Toowoomba North) was elected as the ALP Member for Mount Ommaney in 1992 Wendy Richardson (Barron River) won the primary vote as the LNP candidate for Barron River in 2009 but lost on preferences Andrea Johanson (Albert) had been an LNP candidate for Albert. Shane Guley (Rockhampton) had contested the Electoral district of Gregory for the ALP. A number of union members were endorsed as candidates for the Queensland Party.

== Platform and beliefs ==
The key platforms that the Queensland Party advocated included restoration of the Queensland Legislative Council, protection of public ownership of Queensland assets, a coal seam gas moratorium, decentralisation and Royalties for Regions and free public transport for senior citizens between 9 am and 2 pm.

== Bob Irwin ==
On 1 July 2011, Bob Irwin announced he was considering challenging Labor incumbent Kate Jones and Liberal National Party leader Campbell Newman for the seat of Ashgrove in Brisbane, following discussions with Aidan McLindon over the impact of coal seam gas mining. On 5 September it was reported in the mainstream media that Bob had become disenchanted with politics and felt he could best carry on his passion for animal conservation and fight against the coal seam gas industry from outside of the political arena.

== Merger with Katter's Australian Party and de-registration ==
On 6 June 2011, it was reported that Queensland Party founder and leader, Aidan McLindon, was interested in discussions with Katter's Australian Party about a possible merger. On 9 August 2011, Aidan McLindon announced that the Queensland Party would merge with Katter's Australian Party and he became its State Leader. The majority of the Queensland Party Executive and candidates supported the decision to merge the party, with many candidates subsequently seeking endorsement with Katter's Australian Party. Most were endorsed but Jim Nicholls, the Queensland Party Chairman, refused to accept a review of his endorsement in Mount Isa. Jason Somerville was also rejected as a candidate in the merged party due to his personal support for gay marriage.

A small group of Queensland Party members opposed the merger and attempted to maintain the Queensland Party as a separate party. However, an Electoral Commission of Queensland investigation found that following the merger the Queensland Party no longer had enough members to maintain separate registration. The merger was effectively finalised when the ECQ removed the Queensland Party from the register of political parties in Queensland on 13 December 2011.

== See also ==
- List of political parties in Australia
- Politics of Queensland
