= 2007 Brisbane Central state by-election =

- 13 October 2007

Electoral district of Brisbane Central in the Queensland Legislative Assembly

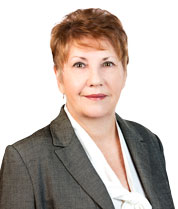
	First party	Second party	Third party
			FFP
Candidate	Grace Grace	Anne Boccabella	Mark A. White
Party	Labor	Greens	Family First
Primary vote	11,248	7,396	1,738
Percentage	50.35%	33.11%	7.78%
Swing	▼0.13	▲14.83	▲7.78
TCP	57.85%	42.15%
TCP swing	▼6.92	▲42.15
MP before election
Peter Beattie
Labor
Elected MP
Grace Grace
Labor

The 2007 Brisbane Central state by-election was held on 13 October 2007 to elect the member for Brisbane Central in the Queensland Legislative Assembly, following the resignation of Labor Party MP and former premier Peter Beattie.

The National–Liberal coalition failed to stand a candidate in the by-election. A total of six candidates stood in the election.

Grace Grace held the seat for Labor with slightly over 50% of the vote, negating the need for the count to go to preferences. In the absence of a National–Liberal coalition candidate, the party with the largest gains were the Greens, who scored a swing in their favour of 14.83%.

== Results ==
2007 Brisbane Central state by-election
Party	Candidate	Votes	%	±%
Labor	Grace Grace	11,248	50.35	−0.13
Greens	Anne Boccabella	7,396	33.11	+14.83
Family First	Mark A. White	1,738	7.78	+7.78
Independent	Erik Olaf Eriksen	711	3.18	+3.18
Independent	Ronald Davy	674	3.02	+3.02
One Nation	Ian Nelson	574	2.57	+2.57
Total formal votes		30,111	93.21	−1.16
Informal votes		2,193	6.79	+1.16
Turnout		32,304	84.93	−6.86
Two-candidate-preferred result
Labor	Grace Grace	11,594	57.85	−6.92
Greens	Anne Boccabella	8,449	42.15	+42.15
Labor hold				

== See also ==
- List of Queensland state by-elections
