= Electoral district of Stafford =

State electoral district of Queensland, Australia

Stafford Queensland—Legislative Assembly
- Electoral map of Stafford 2017
- State: Queensland
- MP: Luke Richmond
- Party: Labor
- Namesake: Stafford
- Electors: 38,928 (2020)
- Area: 21 km^{2} (8.1 sq mi)
- Demographic: Outer-metropolitan
- Coordinates: 27°24′S 153°1′E
Electorates around Stafford:
Aspley	Aspley	Aspley
Everton	Stafford	Nudgee
Cooper	McConnel	Clayfield

Stafford is a Legislative Assembly of Queensland electoral district in the state of Queensland, Australia.

It is located in the inner northern residential suburbs of Brisbane. Suburbs in the current electorate include Stafford, Gordon Park, Grange, Kedron, Stafford Heights, and parts of Chermside, Chermside West, McDowall, Alderley, Wilston, Newmarket and Windsor. The Electorate includes the Prince Charles Hospital.

Stafford was first formed in 1972, when it was won by Labor's Roy Harvey. This changed in 1974 when the seat went to Liberal Terry Gygar. Gygar held the seat until 1983, at which point he lost it to Labor's Denis Murphy, but after Murphy's death Gygar was able to retake the seat at the 1984 Stafford by-election. Gygar was re-elected in 1986 but lost the seat in 1989 to Labor's Rod Welford.

In 1992 the seat was abolished, and Welford moved to Everton. But a redistribution saw the seat recreated in 2001 after Chermside and Kedron were amalgamated. Suburbs in the 2001–2006 electorate included Stafford, Chermside, Gordon Park, Kedron, Lutwyche, Stafford Heights and parts of Albion, Chermside West, Wavell Heights and Wooloowin. Labor's Terry Sullivan held the seat from 2001 to 2006 and Labor's Stirling Hinchliffe until 2012 when Liberal National MP Chris Davis won the seat.

A 2014 Stafford by-election was held on 19 July as a result of the resignation of Davis. The by-election was won by Labor's Anthony Lynham with a 62 percent two-party vote from a 19.1 percent two-party swing.

== Members for Stafford ==
First incarnation (1972–1992)
Member	Party	Term
Roy Harvey	Labor	1972–1974
Terry Gygar	Liberal	1974–1983
Denis Murphy	Labor	1983–1984
Terry Gygar	Liberal	1984–1989
Rod Welford	Labor	1989–1992
Second incarnation (2001–present)
Member	Party	Term
Terry Sullivan	Labor	2001–2006
Stirling Hinchliffe	Labor	2006–2012
Chris Davis	Liberal National	2012–2014
Anthony Lynham	Labor	2014–2020
Jimmy Sullivan	Labor	2020–2025
Jimmy Sullivan	Independent	2025–2026
Luke Richmond	Labor	2026–present

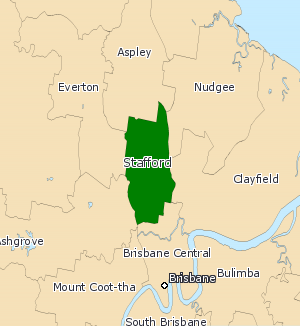
Electoral map of Stafford 2008

== Election results ==
2026 Stafford state by-election
Party	Candidate	Votes	%	±%
Liberal National	Fiona Hammond	13,146	40.34	+2.27
Labor	Luke Richmond	10,034	30.79	−7.98
Greens	Jess Lane	4,777	14.66	−3.40
Independent	Liam Parry	1,244	3.82	+3.82
Legalise Cannabis	Jacqueline Verne	960	2.95	+2.95
Family First	Alan Denaro	767	2.35	+0.42
Animal Justice	Lucy O’Brien	680	2.09	+2.09
Independent	Damian Smart	612	1.88	+1.88
Libertarian	Daniel Selff	370	1.14	+1.14
Total formal votes		32,590	96.44	−0.91
Informal votes		1,202	3.56	+0.91
Turnout		33,792	81.63	−8.60
Registered electors		41,397		
Two-candidate-preferred result
Labor	Luke Richmond	16,738	51.36	−3.96
Liberal National	Fiona Hammond	15,852	48.64	+3.96
Labor hold		Swing	−3.96	

Primary vote results in Stafford (Second Incarnation) (Parties that have never gotten 5% of the vote are omitted)
Labor
Liberal/Liberal National
Greens
View source data.
Two-party-preferred vote vote results in Stafford (Second Incarnation) View source data.
