= Aidan McLindon =

Australian politician (born 1980)

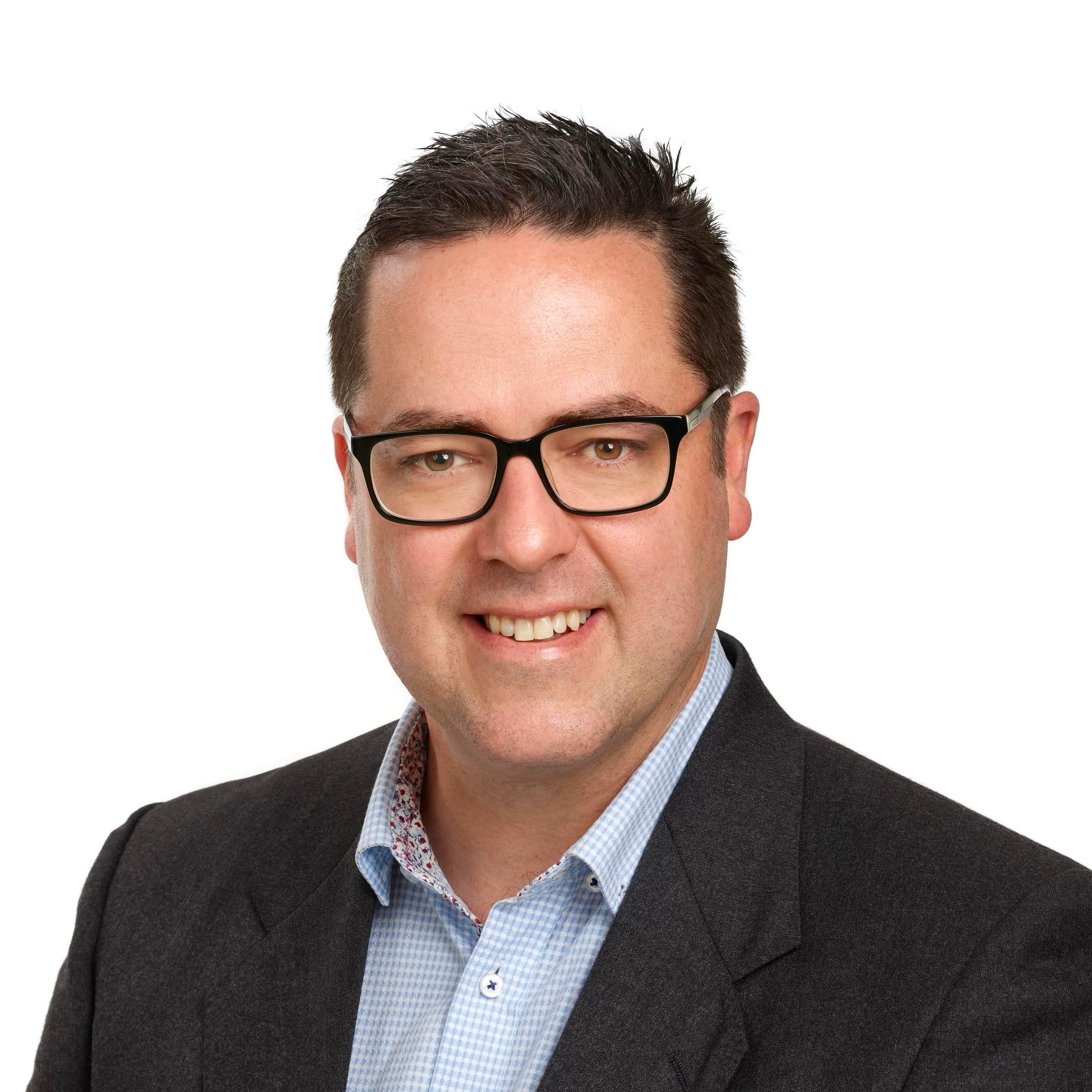

Member of the Queensland Legislative Assembly for Beaudesert
- In office 21 March 2009 – 24 March 2012
- Preceded by: Kev Lingard
- Succeeded by: Jon Krause

Leader of The Queensland Party
- In office 5 August 2010 – 9 August 2011
- Deputy: Peter Pyke
- Preceded by: Party established
- Succeeded by: Party merged

Leader of Katter's Australian Party in Queensland
- In office 9 August 2011 – 26 April 2012
- Leader: Bob Katter
- Preceded by: Party established
- Succeeded by: Robbie Katter

Deputy Leader of the Freedom Party
- In office 29 September 2022 – 6 September 2023
- Leader: Morgan Jonas
- Preceded by: Party established

Personal details
- Born: Aidan Patrick McLindon; 26 February 1980 (age 46) Darwin, Northern Territory, Australia
- Party: Independent (2014–2021; since 2023)
- Other political affiliations: National (2004–2008); Liberal National (2008–2010); Queensland Party (2010–2012); Katter's Australian (2012–2013); Family First (2013); Federation (2021); Freedom (2022–2023)
- Education: Springwood State High School
- Alma mater: Griffith University

Aidan Patrick McLindon (born 26 February 1980) is an Australian politician. He was first elected for the seat of Beaudesert to the Queensland State Parliament for the Liberal National Party at the 2009 state election. He resigned from that party to become an independent in May 2010, and in June 2010 he established The Queensland Party, which he merged with Katter's Australian Party in August 2011. He lost his seat to the LNP at the 2012 election. Bob Katter appointed McLindon as National Director for the newly created Katter's Australian Party. 18 months later McLindon resigned to spend more time with his family. McLindon established an independent political consultancy, AMac Consultants Pty Ltd, following the 2013 federal election.

== Early life and background ==
McLindon was born in Darwin, Northern Territory, and was a bar attendant and musician before entering politics. He attended school at Springwood State High School where he was elected a prefect.

McLindon gained some publicity in the media for his musical interests, especially his involvement in the alternative rock band KiLLTV. In 2005, he was fined $250 on a public nuisance charge after jumping on the set of the Big Brother season 5 finale as Gretel Killeen prepared to announce the winner.

His military service included roles as an infantry soldier and driver 1997–2002 in the Australian Army.

McLindon cites an early interest in politics at the age of 15 from work experience at Queensland Parliament House in 1995. He later went on to complete a degree in Government and Politics, majoring in Public Policy, at Griffith University. McLindon acknowledged a number of academics and political scientists from the university in his inaugural speech to Queensland Parliament.

== Political career ==
=== Queensland politics ===
In 1998 McLindon was preselected by the Liberal Party to run for the state seat of Waterford as Australia's youngest politically endorsed candidate at the age of 17 years, where he claims to have doorknocked 17,500 homes. McLindon came third of three candidates, with 24.5% of the vote.

McLindon served as a Logan City councillor 2004–2009, including as Chair of the Environment and Sustainability portfolio. In 2009 he was preselected to succeed Kev Lingard as the Liberal National Party candidate for Beaudesert.

McLindon successfully defended the seat at the 2009 Queensland state election for the LNP against former One Nation leader Pauline Hanson who contested the seat as an independent.

In early 2010, McLindon attracted significant media attention by unsuccessfully challenging Liberal National Party of Queensland (LNP), Lawrence Springborg, for his position in the party at a parliamentary meeting of the LNP.

In May 2010, McLindon and Burnett MP Rob Messenger, who had seconded McLindon's nomination as deputy leader, resigned from the LNP to sit as Independents, claiming that the party had become victim to "flawed political process". McLindon said that the LNP needed to “wake up a bit and start being relevant".

In June 2010, McLindon announced the formation of a new party, The Queensland Party, based on "moderate" ideals. McLindon stated that the party would run in all Queensland seats at the next state election, with the exception of the five seats held by Independent MPs.

In August 2011, McLindon announced the merger of The Queensland Party with Katter's Australian Party. Some members of The Queensland Party opposed the merger but an Electoral Commission of Queensland investigation found that they did not have the required numbers to maintain the separate registration of the party and it was removed from the register of political parties in December 2011. Most Queensland Party candidates were endorsed by Katter's Australian Party. As part of the deal, McLindon became the merged party's Queensland state leader.

McLindon has advocated the removal of poker machines from towns and cities around Queensland to be moved into a new "AusVegas" in the Cairns region. He has also been an advocate for the restoration of the Upper House in Queensland.

=== Victorian politics ===
McLindon had no political party affiliations from 2013 until 2021, when he joined the Australian Federation Party.

On 4 July 2022, he announced his candidacy on behalf of the right-wing to far-right Freedom Party for the seat of Mulgrave in Victoria to contest against Daniel Andrews in the state elections. McLindon was unsuccessful, receiving 2.2% of the vote, and failing to unseat the Premier. Before the 2022 Victorian state election, McLindon formed a self-described 'ethical bloc' in order to bring together the minor right-wing parties into preference negotiations. McLindon was referred to as the preference 'blocker' in response to political consultant 'preference whisperer' Glenn Druery who has been widely criticised for his exchanging preferences for cash.

On 6 September 2023, it was reported that McLindon was attempting to join the Victorian Liberal Party for the second time. This would require a majority of the state assembly to approve.

McLindon was elected as a Councillor for the Kirrip Ward in the City of Whittlesea in the 2024 Local Government elections. He was elected as the Mayor of City of Whittlesea on 19 November 2024. However in April 2025, McLindon was suspended from council and commission of inquiry into Whittlesea Council launched after he was accused by council staff of intimidating behaviour, including aggressive questioning of staff over the establishment of a Rainbow Advisory Group for the LGBTQ community. His fellow councillors also passed a unanimous vote of no confidence into McLindon to continue as mayor.

In October 2025, the Commission of Inquiry’s report into Whittlesea council found that McLindon as mayor "failed to perform the role in many ways" prior to his suspension and that "The basis of this suspension was that Mr McLindon's behaviour was creating a serious risk to the health and safety of councillors and/or council staff," citing that he "personally demonstrated extremely poor conduct" and that he "[made] unsubstantiated and sometimes bizarre accusations against the council, the council administration and the Victorian government, Mr McLindon generated misinformation and brought the council into disrepute" A council monitor was subsequently appointed to the end of 2025.

McLindon contested the 2025 Werribee state by-election polling tenth of 12 candidates with approximately 0.6 percent of the primary vote.

Parliament of Queensland
Preceded by Kev Lingard	Member for Beaudesert; 2009–2012	Succeeded by Jon Krause
Party political offices
New party	Leader of the Queensland Party; 2010–2011	Party deregistered (succeeded by himself as Leader of Katter's Australian Party in Queensland)
Party formed	Leader of Katter's Australian Party in Queensland; 2011–2012	Succeeded by Robbie Katter
