= Jon Krause =

Australian politician

Jon Krause MP MP
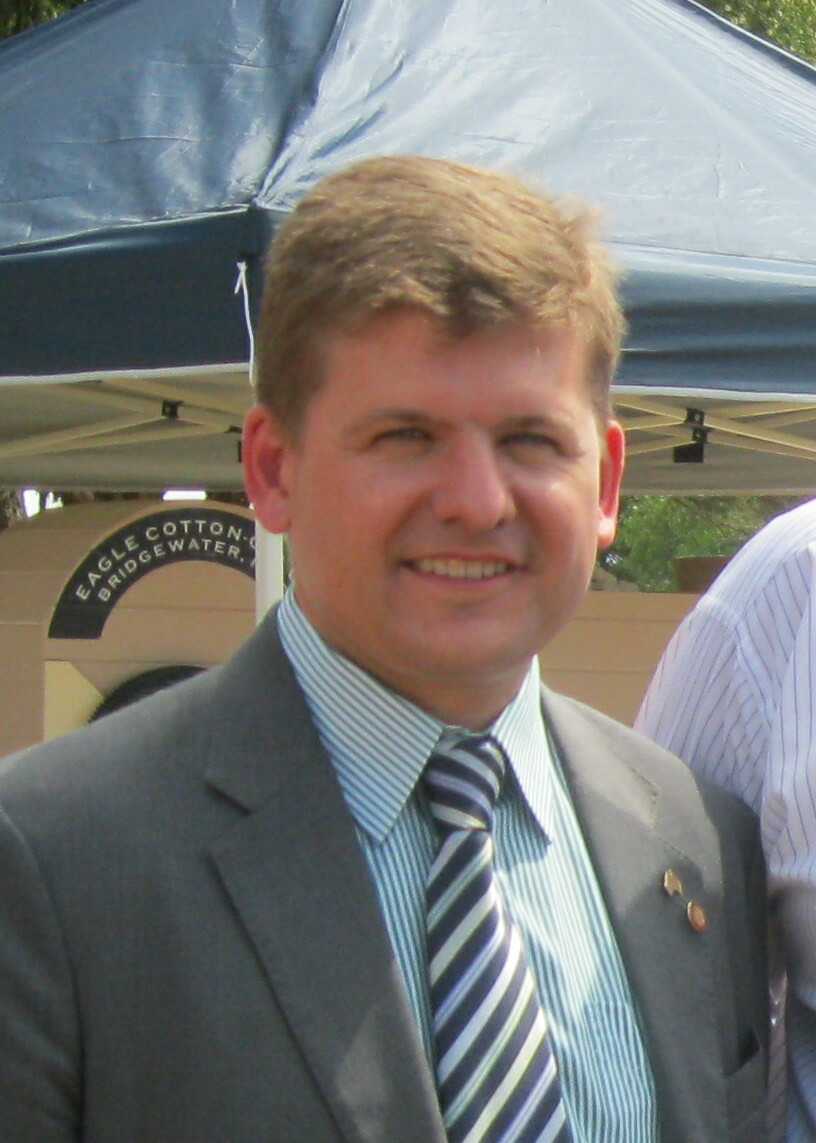
- Krause in 2013

Deputy Speaker
- Incumbent
- Assumed office 28 November 2024
- Leader: David Crisafulli, Premier of Queensland
- Preceded by: Joe Kelly MP

Shadow Minister for Tourism, Sport and Racing
- In office 6 May 2016 – 25 November 2017
- Leader: Tim Nicholls
- Preceded by: Jann Stuckey
- Succeeded by: Position abolished

Member of the Queensland Parliament for Scenic Rim
- Incumbent
- Assumed office 25 November 2017
- Preceded by: New seat

Member of the Queensland Parliament for Beaudesert
- In office 24 March 2012 – 25 November 2017
- Preceded by: Aidan McLindon
- Succeeded by: Seat abolished

Personal details
- Born: 12 March 1981 (age 45) Ipswich, Queensland
- Party: Liberal National
- Education: University of Queensland
- Profession: Solicitor
- Website: https://jonkrause.com.au/

Jonathan Mark Krause (born 12 March 1981) is an Australian Liberal National Party politician who is the member of the Legislative Assembly of Queensland for Scenic Rim. He was first elected in 2012 as the member for Beaudesert, which was renamed in 2017.

== Early life ==
Krause was born on 12 March 1981 in Ipswich and grew up on a dairy farm at Marburg. He attended school in Marburg and Ipswich. Krause graduated from Ipswich Grammar School in 1998. He completed law and accounting studies at the University of Queensland.

Parliament of Queensland
Preceded by Aidan McLindon	Member for Beaudesert; 2012–2017	Abolished
New seat	Member for Scenic Rim; 2017–present	Incumbent
