= Robert Cavallucci =

Australian politician (born 1975)

Member of the Queensland Legislative Assembly for Brisbane Central
- In office 24 March 2012 – 31 January 2015
- Preceded by: Grace Grace
- Succeeded by: Grace Grace

Assistant Minister for Multicultural Affairs
- In office 3 April 2012 – 14 February 2015

Personal details
- Born: 11 September 1975 (age 50) Brisbane, Queensland
- Party: Liberal National Party of Queensland
- Spouse: Carlyn Cavallucci
- Children: Rocco cavallucci
- Education: University of Queensland
- Website: www.robertcavallucci.com.au

Roberto Anthony "Robert" Cavallucci (Italian: [kavalˈluttʃi]; born 11 September 1975) is the current Chief Executive Officer of Football Queensland and a former Managing Director in the Infrastructure and Urban Renewal business at Pricewaterhouse Coopers Australia in Brisbane.

Cavallucci was an Australian Liberal National politician who was the member of the Legislative Assembly of Queensland for Brisbane Central from 2012 to 2015.

Cavallucci attained a Bachelor of Science and a Masters of Business Administration prior to a successful professional career in the family property development, investment and construction business spanning the 15 years before entering politics.

== Politics ==
Cavallucci was appointed and sworn in as part of the Newman Ministry as Assistant Minister for Multicultural Affairs on 3 April 2012.

=== 'Safe Night Out Strategy' ===
After being heavily involved in research relating to the impacts of alcohol, lifestyle and culture on the night time economy, Cavallucci in 2014 as State Member for Brisbane Central led, developed and announced a $44.5 million strategy to tackle alcohol related violence across the state. The ‘Safe Night Out Strategy’ was overseen by an implementation panel chaired by Cavallucci and consisting of industry experts and community leaders.

Following his tenure as chair of the ‘Safe Night Out Strategy’ implementation panel, Cavallucci continued his involvement in the development of drug and alcohol policy especially in areas involving ‘alcohol related violence in the night time’ economy, and subsequently published an opinion piece in the Courier Mail titled ‘Why Australia has a drinking problem’ which explored culture and regulation in dealing with alcohol related violence.

=== Support of marriage equality ===
In 2013, Cavallucci became the first member of Campbell Newman’s conservative government other than the Premier to publicly support same-sex marriage, taking a stance in opposition to what was then party policy.

Reflecting his belief in personal freedoms, Cavallucci was a vocal supporter of marriage equality in his time as a state MP, and continued to advocate for LGBTI rights within the corporate world after his tenure in the Newman government.

=== Expunging historical criminal convictions for gay sexual activity ===
In 2014, Cavallucci took a lead role in bringing the issue of expunging historical criminal convictions for gay consensual sexual activity to the attention of the state government as Brisbane Central state Liberal MP at the time.

=== Queensland Cultural Diversity Policy ===
As the Assistant Minister for Multicultural Affairs, Cavallucci was instrumental in the development of and personally wrote the government’s Queensland Cultural Diversity Policy, drawing on his rich insight into migrant communities in Australia as the son of Italian migrants.

The Queensland Cultural Diversity Policy focused on improving outcomes to language and economic independence, education participation and attainment, and community participation.

In January 2014 ahead of Australia Day, Cavallucci penned an opinion piece on migration and diversity in Australia titled ‘Diversity in all its forms has shaped this land.’

At the 2015 Queensland State Election Cavallucci lost his seat to former member, Grace Grace.

== PwC Australia ==
Cavallucci was Managing Director and leader of PwC’s Infrastructure and Urban Renewal business in Queensland from March 2015 to November 2019.

== Football Queensland ==
Cavallucci was appointed Chief Executive Officer of Football Queensland, the state governing body for football, in November 2019.

=== Future of Football 2020+ ===
In May 2020, Cavallucci and Football Queensland announced the launch of the Future of Football 2020+, an extensive consultation process inviting Queensland’s football community to provide feedback to help shape the future governance, administration and competitions across the game. The Future of Football 2020+ Consultation Paper was subsequently released in May 2020 before months of state-wide community consultation culminated in the release of an Opportunities Paper in September 2020.

== Community Interests ==
=== Football ===
As former President of Brisbane City Football Club, Cavallucci created and chaired Brisbane City’s A-League expansion bid. Cavallucci has also served on the Brisbane Roar Football Club Advisory Council and on the Football Brisbane Board of Directors, and was a founding Director of Jade North’s Kickin’ with a Cuz Indigenous football program.

=== Queensland Catholic Education ===
Cavallucci continues to serve as an Advisory Board Member of Queensland Catholic Education since April 2015.

Parliament of Queensland
Preceded by Grace Grace	Member for Brisbane Central; 2012–2015	Succeeded by Grace Grace
