= Grace Grace =

Australian politician

The Honourable Grace Grace MP
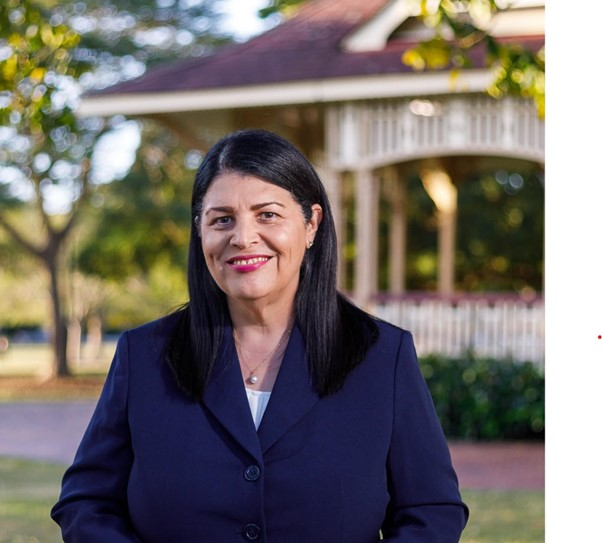

Shadow Minister for Trade
- Incumbent
- Assumed office 8 November 2024
- Leader: Steven Miles
- Preceded by: David Janetzki (as Shadow Minister for Investment and Trade)

Shadow Minister for Industrial Relations
- Incumbent
- Assumed office 8 November 2024
- Leader: Steven Miles
- Preceded by: Jarrod Bleijie

Shadow Minister for Olympic and Paralympic Games
- Incumbent
- Assumed office 8 November 2024
- Leader: Steven Miles
- Preceded by: Jarrod Bleijie (as Shadow Minister for Olympic and Paralympic Infrastructure and Jobs); Tim Mander (as Shadow Minister for Olympic and Paralympic Sport and Regional Engagement)

Shadow Minister for Racing
- Incumbent
- Assumed office 8 November 2024
- Leader: Steven Miles
- Preceded by: Tim Mander (as Shadow Minister for Sport and Racing)
Ministerial positions
Minister for State Development and Infrastructure of Queensland
In office 18 December 2023 – 28 October 2024
Premier	Steven Miles
Preceded by	Steven Miles
Succeeded by	Jarrod Bleijie (as Minister for State Development, Infrastructure and Planning)
Minister for Industrial Relations of Queensland
In office 7 December 2015 – 28 October 2024
Premier	Annastacia Palaszczuk; Steven Miles
Preceded by	Curtis Pitt
Succeeded by	Jarrod Bleijie
Minister for Racing of Queensland
In office 12 November 2020 – 28 October 2024
Premier	Annastacia Palaszczuk; Steven Miles
Preceded by	Stirling Hinchliffe
Succeeded by	Tim Mander (as Minister for Sport and Racing)
Minister for Education of Queensland
In office 12 December 2017 – 17 December 2023
Premier	Annastacia Palaszczuk; Steven Miles
Preceded by	Kate Jones
Succeeded by	Di Farmer
Minister for Employment of Queensland
In office 7 December 2015 – 11 December 2017
Premier	Annastacia Palaszczuk
Preceded by	Curtis Pitt
Succeeded by	Shannon Fentiman
Minister for Multicultural Affairs of Queensland
In office 7 December 2015 – 11 December 2017
Premier	Annastacia Palaszczuk
Preceded by	Shannon Fentiman
Succeeded by	Stirling Hinchliffe

Deputy Speaker of the Queensland Legislative Assembly
- In office 24 March 2015 – 16 February 2016
- Preceded by: Mark Robinson
- Succeeded by: Di Farmer

Member of the Queensland Parliament for McConnel Brisbane Central (2007–2012, 2015–2017)
- Incumbent
- Assumed office 31 January 2015
- Preceded by: Robert Cavallucci
- In office 13 October 2007 – 24 March 2012
- Preceded by: Peter Beattie
- Succeeded by: Robert Cavallucci

Personal details
- Born: Ignazia Graziella Farfaglia; 12 August 1958 (age 68) Brisbane, Queensland
- Party: Labor
- Spouse: Michael Grace
- Website: www.gracegracemp.com

Ignazia Graziella "Grace" Grace (née Farfaglia) (born 12 August 1958) is an Australian politician and unionist from the state of Queensland. She has been a member of the Legislative Assembly of Queensland for the seat of McConnel and its predecessor seat, Brisbane Central, for all but two years since 2007.

Grace was a cabinet minister in the Palaszczuk and Miles Labor Governments from 2015 to 2024. She was also General Secretary of the Queensland Council of Unions from 2000 to 2007.

== Early life ==
Grace was born in Brisbane in 1958. She is the daughter of Italian migrants Salvatore and Concetta Farfaglia, who arrived in Australia in the early 1950s. Her father arrived first and cut cane in north Queensland to pay for her mother's fare to come over from Sicily. Grace attended All Hallows School in Fortitude Valley.

Grace's father Salvatore suffered a serious workplace injury at a tannery that rendered him unable to work, which inspired her later involvement in the union movement. She had a career as an official in several unions and served as an industrial relations advisor to the Keating government. Grace was elected as the first female General Secretary of the Queensland Council of Unions in 2000 and served in that role until 2007.

She married Michael Grace in 1985 and has one child.

== Political career ==
Grace was first elected to the State Parliament at the 2007 Brisbane Central state by-election following the resignation of Premier Peter Beattie. Grace was re-elected in 2009 but lost the seat to the Liberal National Party's Robert Cavallucci in 2012. She won back the seat of Brisbane Central at the 2015 state election. After the seat was renamed McConnel, she was re-elected again in 2017, 2020 and 2024.

=== Member for Brisbane Central & McConnel (2007–2012, 2015–) ===
Grace was a notable supporter of the Bligh Government's decision to legislate civil partnerships for same-sex couples in Queensland, and voted to reinstate them in 2015 after civil partnerships were ended by the Newman LNP Government. New Farm and Fortitude Valley, the main centres for Brisbane's LGBTIQ+ community, are both in her electorate and she has built close ties with gay rights organisations.

Later as an MP and minister in the Palaszczuk Government she supported further reforms including legalising same-sex adoptions; equalisation of the age of consent in Queensland; a Queensland Government apology to people convicted of homosexual offences before homosexuality was legalised in 1990 and passing legislation to allow for those historic convictions to be expunged; a ban on gay conversion therapies; and passing legislation to modernise birth certificates to better recognise trans and gender-diverse Queenslanders, including allowing people to have their gender accurately documented without undergoing sexual reassignment surgery.

Following a commitment made by Grace and the Labor Party at the 2015 state election public sexual health services were restored at Biala, Brisbane's only free sexual health clinic. Biala's funding and staffing has been significantly cut by the Newman LNP Government in 2013.

Grace campaigned in the 2015 state election to prevent the sale of Fortitude Valley State School after it was closed in 2013 by the Newman Government and earmarked for private property development. As Education Minister she opened a new school, Fortitude Valley State Secondary College, on the site in 2020. This was the first inner-city Brisbane school to be built in over 50 years and the first vertical school in Queensland.

In 2016, Grace supported a campaign which succeeded in restored public access to the riverfront boardwalk at Mactaggarts Place in Teneriffe after a fence was erected by body corporate of private apartment building Mactaggarts Place.

Grace advocated for the $31.5 million redevelopment of Ballymore Stadium that was completed in 2023. This established the National Rugby Training Centre as the new national headquarters of the Australian national women's rugby union team, and a new training base for the Queensland Reds.

In conscience votes, Grace supported the Termination of Pregnancy Bill 2018, which decriminalised abortion in Queensland, and the Voluntary Assisted Dying Bill 2021, which legalised voluntary assisted dying.

=== Palaszczuk Government (2015–2023) ===
In 2015 Grace was elected Deputy Speaker of the Queensland Legislative Assembly until being appointed as a cabinet minister in the Palaszczuk Government. In December 2015, following a cabinet reshuffle she was sworn in as Minister for Employment and Industrial Relations, Minister for Racing and Minister for Multicultural Affairs.

During the government's second term (2017–2020) Grace was made Minister for Education and Minister for Industrial Relations. Following the 2020 state election, she maintained these roles and was made Minister for Racing for a second time.

==== Industrial Relations ====
Grace has served continuously as Minister for Industrial Relations since December 2015 and passed significant legislative reforms that made Queensland the first Australian State to establish a scheme to licence the labour-hire industry in 2017; make industrial manslaughter an offence in 2017; make wage-theft a criminal offence; and to introduce entitlements for Queensland public sector workers to 10 days paid domestic and family violence leave in 2016 and 10 days reproductive health leave in 2024.

Grace also reformed Queensland's trading hours arrangements in 2017, by reducing 99 different trading-hour zones to four core trading hours areas to provide better certainty for workers and businesses; and established Easter Sunday and Christmas Eve after 6PM as public holidays in Queensland.

In 2018 Grace was the first minister in the country to advocate for a national ban on the use, supply, importation, and manufacture of engineered stone to protect workers from silica and dust diseases. All Australian jurisdictions agreed to a national ban in December 2023.

==== Education ====
As Education Minister, Grace oversaw the Cooler Cleaner Schools Program that air-conditioned every classroom, library and staff room in Queensland state schools, and placed almost 200,000 solar panels on roof tops of over 900 state schools by 2022, which contributed 61.4 megawatts towards Queensland's renewable energy target.

Grace announced that Queensland children would have access to free kindergarten in sessional kindergartens and long day care services for 15 hours per week, 40 weeks per year, from 2024.

In 2023 Grace announced a $35 million investment to provide vending machines with free period products to any Queensland state school that wanted one.

=== Miles Government (2023–2024) ===
Following the succession of Premier Steven Miles, Grace became Minister for State Development and Infrastructure, Minister for Industrial Relations and Minister for Racing in the Miles Government on 18 December 2023.

==== Olympics ====
As State Development Minister, Grace has responsibility for the 2032 Brisbane Olympic and Paralympic Games. In December 2023 the Miles Government commissioned an independent review into Games venue infrastructure, led by former Brisbane Lord Mayor Graham Quirk. The Review made 30 recommendations, including a proposal to build 'greenfield' 55,000-seat stadium in Victoria Park in Brisbane with an estimated $3.4 billion cost. The Miles Government accepted 27 of the Review's recommendations in March 2024, but it rejected the proposal to build a stadium in Victoria Park. Grace said of the proposal: "Victoria Park is highly-valued by the community, and we have no plans to spend billions of dollars to encroach into that green space."

=== Opposition ===
The Miles Government was defeated at the 2024 state election and Labor became the Opposition. Grace was appointed to the Shadow Cabinet as Shadow Minister for Trade, Industrial Relations, Olympic and Paralympic Games and Racing.

=== Awards and honours ===
Grace was awarded the Knight of the Order of the Merit of the Italian Republic by the Consul of Italy in 2021.

Parliament of Queensland
Preceded by Peter Beattie	Member for Brisbane Central; 2007–2012	Succeeded by Robert Cavallucci
Preceded by Robert Cavallucci	Member for Brisbane Central; 2015–2017	Abolished
New seat	Member for McConnel; 2017–present	Incumbent
Preceded by Mark Robinson	Deputy Speaker of the Queensland Legislative Assembly; 2015–2016	Succeeded by Di Farmer
