= Electoral district of Beaudesert =

Former state electoral district of Queensland, Australia

Beaudesert Queensland—Legislative Assembly
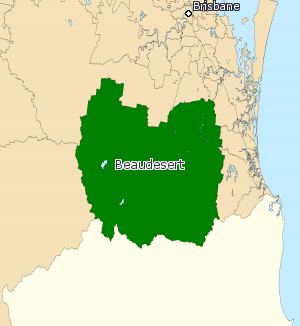
- Beaudesert (2008–2017)
- State: Queensland
- Dates current: 1992–2017
- MP: Several
- Party: Liberal National
- Namesake: Beaudesert
- Electors: 35,644 (2015)
- Area: 4,322 km^{2} (1,668.7 sq mi)
- Coordinates: 28°2′S 152°48′E

Beaudesert was an electoral district of the Legislative Assembly in the Australian state of Queensland from 1991 to 2017.

Beaudesert encompassed rural and semi-urban regions located to the south of the Brisbane metropolitan area. Major communities located within this electoral included Beaudesert, Boonah, Aratula, Jimboomba, Tamborine, Canungra and Rathdowney.

The seat was created at the 1991 redistribution largely from the territory of the abolished seat of Fassifern. It was a safe seat for the National Party, and its successor the Liberal National Party, throughout its entire existence, although former member Aidan McLindon left the LNP in 2010 to form The Queensland Party. He subsequently joined and became state leader of Katter's Australian Party in 2011, but lost his seat in 2012.

The seat was removed in the 2017 electoral redistribution, being replaced (approximately) by the new Scenic Rim.

== Members ==
Member	Party	Term
Kev Lingard	National	1992–2008
Kev Lingard	Liberal National	2008–2009
Aidan McLindon	Liberal National	2009–2010
Aidan McLindon	Independent	2010
Aidan McLindon	Queensland	2010–2011
Aidan McLindon	Australian	2011–2012
Jon Krause	Liberal National	2012–2017
