= Electoral district of Brisbane Central =

Former state electoral district of Queensland, Australia

Brisbane Central Queensland—Legislative Assembly
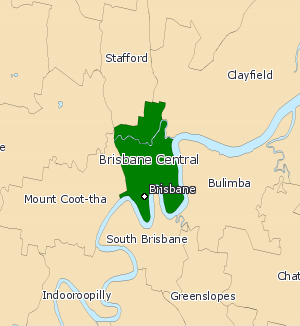
- Brisbane Central (2008–2017)
- State: Queensland
- Dates current: 1977–2017
- MP: Four
- Party: Labor (4 times); Liberal National (once)
- Namesake: Brisbane CBD
- Electors: 34,465 (2015)
- Area: 18 km^{2} (6.9 sq mi)
- Demographic: Inner-metropolitan
- Coordinates: 27°27′S 153°2′E

Brisbane Central was an electoral division in the state of Queensland, Australia.

The electorate covered the central portion of Brisbane, including the Brisbane central business district as well as the inner suburbs of Bowen Hills, Fortitude Valley, Herston, Kelvin Grove, Spring Hill, New Farm, Newmarket and Windsor. It was bordered on the east and south by the Brisbane River.

== History ==
The Town of Brisbane was one of the original electorates established by Order-in-Council in 1859. Since then, the name of the electorate covering what is now the CBD of Brisbane has been variously known as Brisbane City, North Brisbane, Brisbane North and Brisbane (from 1912). Brisbane Central was created in 1977 and was held from 1989 to 2007 by Labor's Peter Beattie, who was Premier of Queensland from 1998. Beattie resigned as both Premier and Member for Brisbane Central and a 2007 Brisbane Central by-election was held. The seat was won by Labor candidate Grace Grace.

In the 2017 electoral redistribution, the Electoral Commission of Queensland changed the name of the electorate to McConnel.

== Members ==
Member	Party	Term
Brian Davis	Labor	1977–1989
Peter Beattie	Labor	1989–2007
Grace Grace	Labor	2007–2012
Robert Cavallucci	Liberal National	2012–2015
Grace Grace	Labor	2015–2017
