= Katter's Australian Party =

Political party in Australia

- Abbreviation: KAP
- Leader: Robbie Katter
- President: Ben Fusco
- Founder: Bob Katter
- Founded: 5 June 2011; 15 years ago
- Registered: 27 September 2011
- Merger of: Queensland Party (2011)
- Headquarters: 2/321 Sturt Street, Townsville, Queensland
- Membership (2013): 1,500
- Ideology: Populism; Left-conservatism; McEwenism; Agrarian socialism; Social conservatism; Economic nationalism; North Queensland statehood
- Colours: Dark red
- House of Representatives: 1 / 150
- Senate: 0 / 76
- Queensland Legislative Assembly: 2 / 93

Website
- kattersaustralianparty.org.au

Katter's Australian Party (KAP) is an agrarian populist political party in Australia that advocates for agrarian socialist economic policies and conservative social policies. It was founded by politician Bob Katter, an independent and former Nationals MP for the seat of Kennedy, with a registration application lodged to the Australian Electoral Commission in 2011.

Katter has been re-elected under the party's label at the 2013, 2016, 2019, 2022 and 2025 federal elections. The party also won two seats at the 2012 Queensland state election, which it retained at the 2015 state election. The party won an additional seat at the 2017 state election which it retained at the 2020 state election and the 2024 state election.

In February 2020, Bob Katter handed the leadership of the party to his son Robbie Katter, a Queensland state MP.

== Name ==
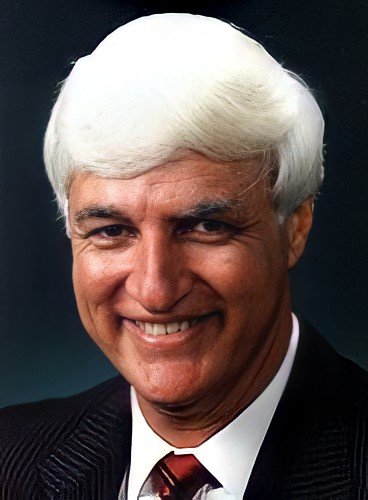
Party founder Bob Katter

The party's application for registration was denied by the Australian Electoral Commission on 17 August 2011, on the grounds that the intended party name ("The Australian Party") was too generic and likely to cause confusion. On 27 September 2011, Katter's Australian Party was registered by the Australian Electoral Commission. Although the party was unsuccessful in registering the shorter party name "The Australian Party" nationally, its simultaneous application to register in Queensland with the abbreviated name succeeded, despite a few public objections.

Under Queensland electoral law the party appears on the state election ballots only under its abbreviated name. To avoid ballot-box party names varying across Australian states, the KAP unsuccessfully appealed to the courts to have ballots reprinted so that the full party name and not the abbreviated one would appear on ballots for the 2012 Queensland state election.

== Political positions ==
The KAP is orientated towards agrarian issues. It has also been described as conservative, socially conservative, populist, and nationalist. Regarding fiscal issues, it supports protectionism, economic nationalism, agrarian socialism, welfare chauvinism, and a developmentalist vision towards the implementation of tariffs, with founder Bob Katter himself describing his views as mirroring those of the former Country Party under the leadership of John McEwen. It advocates for North Queensland statehood. The party is described as economically left-wing and socially right-wing.

Katter, like his father, Bob Sr. before him, has long retained elements of 1950s Australian Labor Party economic policy in his platform, and this is reflected in KAP policy.

Policies announced by Katter include:

=== Crime ===
- Relocation sentencing: in response to high youth crime and re-offence rates in Townsville and other North Queensland cities, KAP advocates for "relocation sentencing" at the state level, which would temporarily relocate youth offenders to remote areas in North-West Queensland, instead of releasing them back into the community where they offended.
- Mandatory minimum sentencing for repeat offenders
- Minimum three years prison for carjacking and unlawful use of a motor vehicle

=== Economy ===
- Establish a government-owned development bank.
- Nationalisation of key services.
- Essential services such as airports, water, electricity, gas, health services, road, rail and port networks, public transport and communications should be provided by government.

=== Energy ===
- Promote the construction of new dams for irrigation and hydro electricity generation.
- Deliver more effective and efficient power transmission networks.

=== Environment ===
- Opposition to a carbon tax and emission trading schemes.
- Support for alternative energy such as ethanol and solar energy. This is to "Reduce carbon emissions well beyond any current carbon reducing initiatives planned by the State and Federal Government".
- Prevent the extraction of coal seam gas within three kilometres (2 mi) of an aquifer.
- Maintain government support for Australia's domestic ethanol industry and mandate the use of ethanol in petrol; in order to curb Australia's carbon footprint and to support native grain and sugar industries.
- Restore vital irrigation water to agriculture in the Murray Darling Basin.
- Increase bio-security and quarantine laws, in order to maintain Australia's disease free status.

=== Firearms and gun control ===
- Generally make it easier for law-abiding citizens to own and operate firearms
- Revise National Firearms Agreement
- Any owner of a farming operation who has demonstrated responsible firearm ownership by holding a current weapons licence of category A, B or higher should have the right to own a category H firearm (handgun)
- Implement real-time licensing, allowing permits to be processed at the point of sale rather than manual processing

=== Industrial relations ===
- Government must ensure that all workers, especially farmers, are able to collectively bargain for their own economic interests.
- Government must stop the use of 457 visas by big business as a means to replace or undermine Australian workers and Australian award pay and conditions.

=== Infrastructure ===
- Deliver better road and rail infrastructure to facilitate regional investment.

=== Property rights ===
- No exploration or mining activity will be permitted on landholders' property without the landholder's consent.
- Personal home ownership must be made easier by government implemented policies.
- Introducing castle law

=== Public service ===
- It is the responsibility of the government to encourage and protect whistle blowers as an important method of discovery of the real health and performance of the public sector; and implement regular, random, independent and external professional audits of the public service sector.

=== Immigration ===
- An end to immigration: "stop it completely and start again".

=== Regulation ===
- Legislate to limit Woolworths and Coles duopoly to 22.5 per cent market share each.
- Halt any privatisation and renationalise privatised assets. "Overseas companies owning basic services will need big profits for their shareholders. You would pay for the profits with price hikes to basic services."
- Implement "orderly" marketing where industry structures undermine reasonable market power to producers (as perceived currently in dairy, egg and sugar industries).
- Restore individual rights, such as "fishing freely and boiling a billy without a permit".
- It is the duty of government to ensure bank lending creates real wealth in terms of improvements of the quality of life for the average Australian.

=== Trade ===
- All government spending on goods to be on Australian products where possible.
- Ensure that any construction contracts undertaken using Australian government funds will use Australian steel.
- Every motor vehicle purchased under a government contract (arguably over 20% of Australia's motor vehicles) to be Australian-made.
- All clothing for armed forces, police and prisons to be manufactured in Australia.
- Significantly increase customs duty on products coming into Australia.
- Mandate premium shelf space on Australian supermarkets for Australian manufactured goods.
- Prevent the sale of essential assets, public or private, including agricultural land and resource assets, to foreign companies and/or sovereign entities without caveats to protect the national interest.
- Government must ensure and limit against corporate monopolisation.

== Federal politics ==
=== 2013 federal election ===
In the 2013 federal election, Katter's Australian Party received 1.04% of the nationwide vote in first preferences in the lower house, and 0.89% nationwide in the Senate. Its best performing state was Queensland with 3.75% of the lower-house vote and 2.94% of the Senate vote.

Katter retained his seat of Kennedy, despite a 16-point swing in favour of the Liberal Nationals.

=== 2016 federal election ===
In the 2016 federal election, Katter's Australian Party received 0.54% of the nationwide vote in first preferences in the lower house, and 0.38% nationwide in the Senate. Bob Katter retained his seat of Kennedy, with a swing of 8.93% towards him. The party's next-best finish was in the Division of Capricornia, where Laurel Carter polled 7.08 percent of the vote.

On 7 July 2016, while counting for the election was still underway and the final result uncertain, Katter announced that he would provide confidence and supply to the Turnbull government in the event that it was reduced to minority government. It proved unnecessary, as the Coalition finished with a one-seat majority. In August 2017, during the parliamentary eligibility crisis, Katter announced that he could not guarantee confidence and supply if the government lost its majority.

=== 2019 federal election ===
In the 2019 Australian federal election, Bob Katter retained the seat of Kennedy. The party also ran candidates in the electorates of Capricornia, Dawson, Herbert, Leichhardt, Maranoa and Wright, plus three Queensland candidates for the Senate.

=== 2022 federal election ===
In the 2022 Australian federal election, Bob Katter retained the seat of Kennedy. The party also ran candidates in three other electorates Dawson, Herbert and Leichhardt, all of which are in Queensland.

=== 2025 federal election ===
In the 2025 Australian federal election, Bob Katter retained the seat of Kennedy. The party also ran candidates in two other electorates Herbert and Leichhardt, both of which are in Queensland.

On 14 April 2025, The Gerard Rennick People First entered into electoral agreement: uniting with the Katter's Australian Party (KAP) on a joint Senate ticket for Queensland.

== State politics ==
=== Queensland ===
The 2024 Queensland state election. Brown seats were won by Katter's Australian Party.

The party fielded candidates at the 2012 Queensland state election. Queensland Independent MP Rob Messenger had expressed interest in joining the party; however, following the merger with the Queensland Party, Messenger declared he would not join the new party as it intended to run against sitting independents at the election.

On 9 August 2011, Katter's Australian Party announced plans to merge with state Beaudesert MP Aidan McLindon's Queensland Party, with Katter's Australian Party as the surviving entity. As part of the deal, McLindon became the merged party's leader in Queensland.

On 30 October 2011, McLindon was joined by Shane Knuth, the Liberal National Party of Queensland (LNP) member for Dalrymple. Knuth, who was from the National half of the merger, objected to what he saw as a reduced voice for regional MPs in the merged party, calling it a Liberal takeover even though the merged party was dominated by former Nationals. He was also displeased with a number of tactics adopted by the LNP's organisational wing, such as grilling potential candidates and maintaining files about Labor MPs containing compromising information.

In the 2012 Queensland state election, the party contested 76 of the 89 seats in the state legislature. Robbie Katter won Mount Isa—which is virtually coextensive with the western portion of his father's federal seat—while Knuth retained Dalrymple. McLindon was defeated in Beaudesert. Katter claimed that the Electoral Commission's decision not to print his name on the ballot cost the party 8.5% of the vote.

On 25 November 2012, the party was joined by Condamine LNP MP Ray Hopper. Like Knuth, Hopper is from the National side of the merger. As Knuth had a year earlier, Hopper claimed that the LNP had been a takeover by the old Liberal Party at the expense of the National Party, and accused the LNP of deliberately purging National influence from the party. Hopper claimed to have spoken to eight other LNP backbenchers who were considering defection. On 29 November Hopper was elected as the party's Queensland state leader.

In the 2015 Queensland state election, the party contested 11 of the 89 seats, with Knuth and Katter retaining their seats, but Hopper failed in a bid for the seat of Nanango. Due to the election's close-run result (44 Labor to 42 LNP with either needing 45), KAP was potentially in a situation to choose the government, and met with both parties and published a list of 28 demands. However, as independent MP Peter Wellington elected to support Labor on confidence and supply, this did not proceed further.

In the 2017 Queensland state election, Shane Knuth won Hill, Robbie Katter won Traeger and increased their seat numbers to 3 with Nick Dametto winning Hinchinbrook. The party increased its share of first preference votes to 2.32% and became the 3rd largest party in the Queensland Parliament.

Katter's Australian Party maintained their parliamentary representation but further increased their share of first preference votes to 2.52% at the 2020 Queensland state election. Robbie Katter, Shane Knuth, and Nick Dametto were all reelected to their respective seats.

Katter's Australian Party maintained their parliamentary representation and further increased their share of first preference votes at the 2024 Queensland state election. Robbie Katter, Shane Knuth, and Nick Dametto were all reelected to their respective seats.

=== Other states ===
The Tasmanian Branch, led by Glenorchy Alderman Jenny Branch-Allen, claimed to have received many expressions of interest by potential candidates for the 2013 federal election.

Ann Bressington, an independent (and formerly No Pokies) member of the South Australian Legislative Council, announced in October 2013 that she would sponsor registration for the party at the 2014 state election, although she did not join the party herself. At the 2014 election, the party did however have two candidates for the Legislative Council, both of which were unsuccessful.

In February 2014, the Country Alliance announced that it would merge with the Victorian Branch of Katter's Australian Party for the upcoming 2014 state election, following confirmation at an extraordinary general meeting of the party. The merged parties plan to contest the election as the "Australian Country Alliance".

In 2018, the party contested the by-election in the New South Wales seat of Wentworth, which was triggered by the resignation of former Prime Minister Malcolm Turnbull. The party's candidate was Robert Callanan, who received the first place on the ballot paper after the draw. Callanan was later disendorsed over undisclosed former links to a brothel. This was the most recent time the party fielded a candidate outside of Queensland.

== Donors ==
Katter's Australian Party has received significant donations from the firearms industry.

For the 2020-21 financial year, the largest disclosed donors to the party were: Sporting Shooters Association of Australia (Queensland) Inc ($130,000 split across two donations), Shooters Union Qld Pty Ltd ($100,000), Firearm Dealers Association - Qld Inc ($100,000), and Charters Towers Toyota ($20,000).

A 2019 report revealed that Katter's Australian Party has taken more than $808,760 from pro-gun groups during the 2011-2018 period. The party received the most disclosed pro-gun donations of all Australian political parties.

== Leaders ==
=== Federal Leader ===
| No. | Leader (birth–death) | Portrait | Electorate | Term of office | |
|---|---|---|---|---|---|
| 1 | Bob Katter (b. 1945) | | Kennedy, Qld. (federal seat) | 5 June 2011 | 3 February 2020 |
| 1 | Bob Katter (b. 1945) | | Kennedy, Qld. (federal seat) | 8 years and 244 days | |
| 2 | Robbie Katter (b. 1977) | | Traeger (state seat) | 3 February 2020 | Incumbent |
| 2 | Robbie Katter (b. 1977) | | Traeger (state seat) | 6 years and 290 days | |

=== State Leaders ===
==== Queensland Leader ====
| No. | Leader (birth–death) | Portrait | Electorate | Term of office | |
|---|---|---|---|---|---|
| 1 | Aidan McLindon (b. 1980) | | Beaudesert | 9 August 2011 | 26 April 2012 |
| 1 | Aidan McLindon (b. 1980) | | Beaudesert | 262 days | |
| 2 | Ray Hopper (b. 1960) | | Condamine | 29 November 2012 | 2 February 2015 |
| 2 | Ray Hopper (b. 1960) | | Condamine | 2 years and 62 days | |
| 3 | Robbie Katter (b. 1977) | | Mount Isa (until 25 November 2017) | 2 February 2015 | Incumbent |
| 3 | Robbie Katter (b. 1977) | | Traeger (from 25 November 2017) | 2 February 2015 | Incumbent |
| 3 | Robbie Katter (b. 1977) | | Traeger (from 25 November 2017) | 11 years and 291 days | |

==== Queensland Deputy Leader ====
| No. | Leader (birth–death) | Portrait | Electorate | Term of office | |
|---|---|---|---|---|---|
| 1 | Nick Dametto (b. 1983) | | Hinchinbrook | 16 November 2021 | 14 October 2025 |
| 1 | Nick Dametto (b. 1983) | | Hinchinbrook | 3 years and 332 days | |

== Electoral results ==
=== Federal ===
House of Representatives
| Election year | No. of overall votes | % of overall vote | Seats won | +/– | Position |
|---|---|---|---|---|---|
| 2013 | 134,226 | 1.04 (6th) | 1 / 150 | ▲1 | Crossbench |
| 2016 (D-D) | 72,879 | 0.54 (9th) | 1 / 150 | Steady | Crossbench |
| 2019 | 69,736 | 0.49 (9th) | 1 / 151 | Steady | Crossbench |
| 2022 | 55,863 | 0.38 (9th) | 1 / 151 | Steady | Crossbench |
| 2025 | 51,091 | 0.34 (10th) | 1 / 151 | Steady | Crossbench |

Senate
| Election year | No. of overall votes | % of overall vote | Seats won | +/– | Position |
|---|---|---|---|---|---|
| 2013 | 119,920 | 0.89 (10th) | 0 / 76 | Steady | Extra-parliamentary |
| 2016 | 53,123 | 0.38 (10th) | 0 / 76 | Steady | Extra-parliamentary |
| 2019 | 51,407 | 0.35 (19th) | 0 / 76 | Steady | Extra-parliamentary |
| 2022 | did not contest | | | | Extra-parliamentary |
| 2025 (Note: KAP candidate Robert Lyon ran second on a joint ticket with Gerard Rennick.) | 150,013 | 0.95 (10th) | 0 / 76 | Steady | Extra-parliamentary |

=== Queensland ===
Legislative Assembly
| Election year | No. of overall votes | % of overall vote | Seats won | +/– | Notes |
|---|---|---|---|---|---|
| 2012 | 282,098 | 11.53 (3rd) | 2 / 89 | ▲2 | Crossbench |
| 2015 | 50,588 | 1.93 (5th) | 2 / 89 | Steady | Crossbench (shared balance of power) |
| 2017 | 62,613 | 2.32 (5th) | 3 / 93 | ▲1 | Crossbench |
| 2020 | 71,893 | 2.52 (5th) | 3 / 93 | Steady | Crossbench |
| 2024 | 75,587 | 2.4 (5th) | 3 / 93 | Steady | Crossbench |

=== South Australia ===
Legislative Council
| Election year | No. of overall votes | % of overall vote | Seats won | +/– | Notes |
|---|---|---|---|---|---|
| 2014 | 1,503 | 0.1 (21st) | 0 / 22 | Steady | Extra-parliamentary |

== List of parliamentarians ==
| Image | Name | Chamber | Electorate | Term began | Term ended | Length of term | Total length of terms |
|---|---|---|---|---|---|---|---|
| | Bob Katter (1945–) | Australian House of Representatives | Kennedy (Qld) | 5 June 2011 | incumbent | 15 years, 168 days | |
| | Aidan McLindon (1980–) | Queensland Legislative Assembly | Beaudesert | 9 August 2011 | 24 March 2012 | 228 days | |
| | Shane Knuth (1966–) | Queensland Legislative Assembly | Dalrymple | 30 October 2011 | 25 November 2017 | 6 years, 26 days | 15 years, 21 days |
| | Shane Knuth (1966–) | Queensland Legislative Assembly | Hill | 25 November 2017 | incumbent | 8 years, 360 days | 15 years, 21 days |
| | Robbie Katter (1977–) | Queensland Legislative Assembly | Mount Isa | 24 March 2012 | 25 November 2017 | 5 years, 246 days | 14 years, 241 days |
| | Robbie Katter (1977–) | Queensland Legislative Assembly | Traeger | 25 November 2017 | incumbent | 8 years, 360 days | 14 years, 241 days |
| | Ray Hopper (1960–) | Queensland Legislative Assembly | Condamine | 25 November 2012 | 31 January 2015 | 2 years, 67 days | |
| | Nick Dametto (1983–) | Queensland Legislative Assembly | Hinchinbrook | 25 November 2017 | 14 October 2025 | 7 years, 323 days | |
| | Fraser Anning (1949–) | Australian Senate | Queensland | 4 June 2018 | 25 October 2018 | 143 days | |
| | Stephen Andrew (1968–) | Queensland Legislative Assembly | Mirani | 9 September 2024 | 26 October 2024 | 47 days | |

== See also ==
- Bob Katter
- Robbie Katter
- List of political parties in Australia
- Katter family
