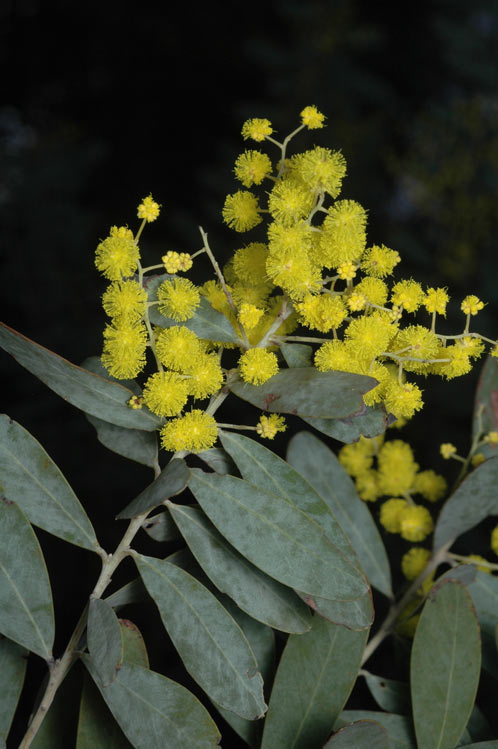
- In Mount Annan Botanic Garden

Scientific classification
- Kingdom: Plantae
- Clade: Embryophytes
- Clade: Tracheophytes
- Clade: Spermatophytes
- Clade: Angiosperms
- Clade: Eudicots
- Clade: Rosids
- Order: Fabales
- Family: Fabaceae
- Subfamily: Caesalpinioideae
- Clade: Mimosoid clade
- Genus: Acacia
- Species: A. jucunda

Binomial name
- Acacia jucunda Maiden & Blakely
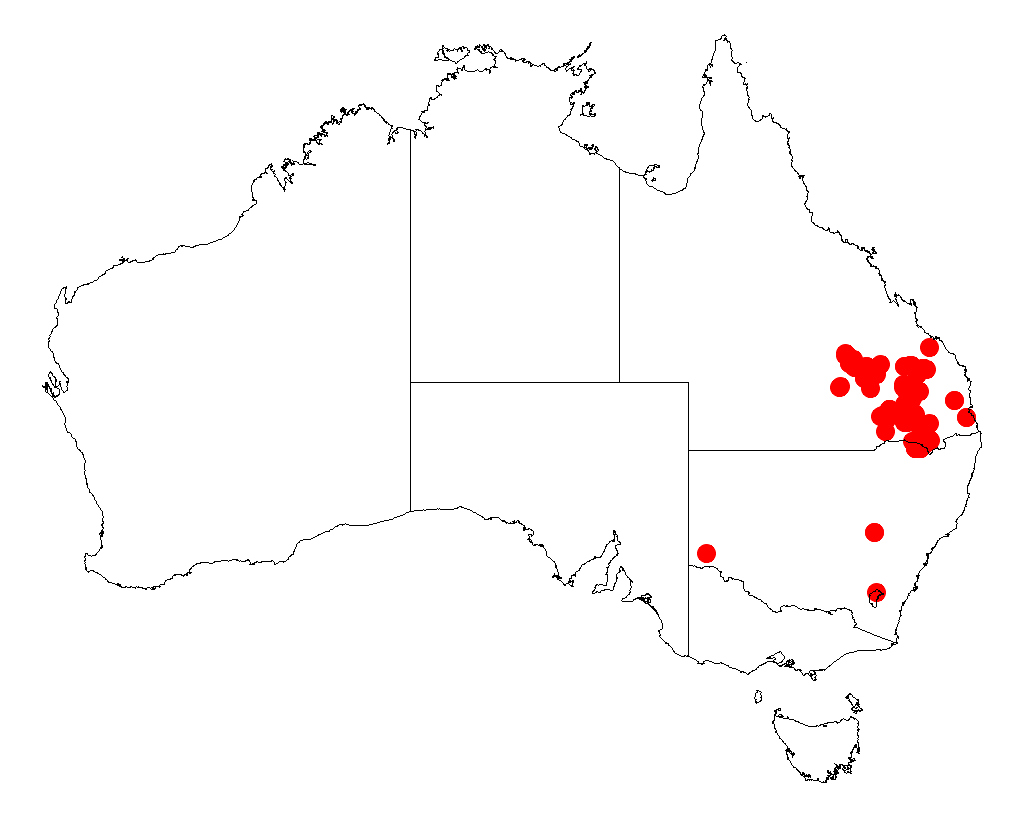
- Occurrence data from AVH

Synonyms
- Racosperma jucundum (Maiden & Blakely) Pedley

= Acacia jucunda =

Glenmorgan wattle

Species of legume

Acacia jucunda, commonly known as Glenmorgan wattle, or Yetman wattle, is a species of flowering plant in the family Fabaceae and is endemic to eastern Australia. It is a shrub or tree with usually lance-shaped phyllodes with the narrower end towards the base, spherical heads of bright golden yellow flowers and firmly papery to thinly leathery pods alternatively rounded over the seeds on either side of the midline.

== Description ==
Acacia jucunda is a shrub or tree that typically grows to a height of 2–8 m (6.6–26.2 ft) with smooth to finely fissured, grey bark and branchlets covered with microscopic hairs and a white powdery bloom. Its phyllodes are usually lance-shaped with the narrower end towards the base, mostly 30–60 mm (1.2–2.4 in) long, 8–20 mm (0.31–0.79 in) wide, glaucous and glabrous on a pulvinus 2–5 mm (0.079–0.197 in) long. The flowers are borne on racemes 30–50 mm (1.2–2.0 in) long with 10 to 20 spherical heads on peduncles 3–6 mm (0.12–0.24 in) long, each head with 15 to 25 bright golden yellow flowers. Flowering occurs in July and August, and the pods are up to 90 mm (3.5 in) long, 8–10 mm (0.31–0.39 in) wide, firmly papery to thinly leathery, covered with a powdery bloom, glabrous and alternately rounded over the seeds. The seeds are oblong, 4–6 mm (0.16–0.24 in) long, slightly shiny with an aril.

== Taxonomy ==
The species was first formally described in 1927 by the Joseph Maiden and William Blakely in the Proceedings of the Royal Society of Queensland of specimens collected by Thomas Lane Bancroft near Chinchilla in southern Queensland in 1918. The specific epithet (jucunda) means 'pleasant' or 'delightful'.

== Distribution and habitat ==
Glenmorgan wattle grows in sand, loam or clay-loam in open forest or woodland, often near Brigalow forest, from Mount Moffat to near Eidsvold in southern Queensland and south to near Yetman in northern New South Wales.

== Conservation status ==
Acacia jucunda is listed as 'least concern' under the Queensland Government Nature Conservation Act 1992 but as 'endangered' in New South Wales under the Biodiversity Conservation Act 2016.

== See also ==
- List of Acacia species
