= Deception Bay Sea Baths =

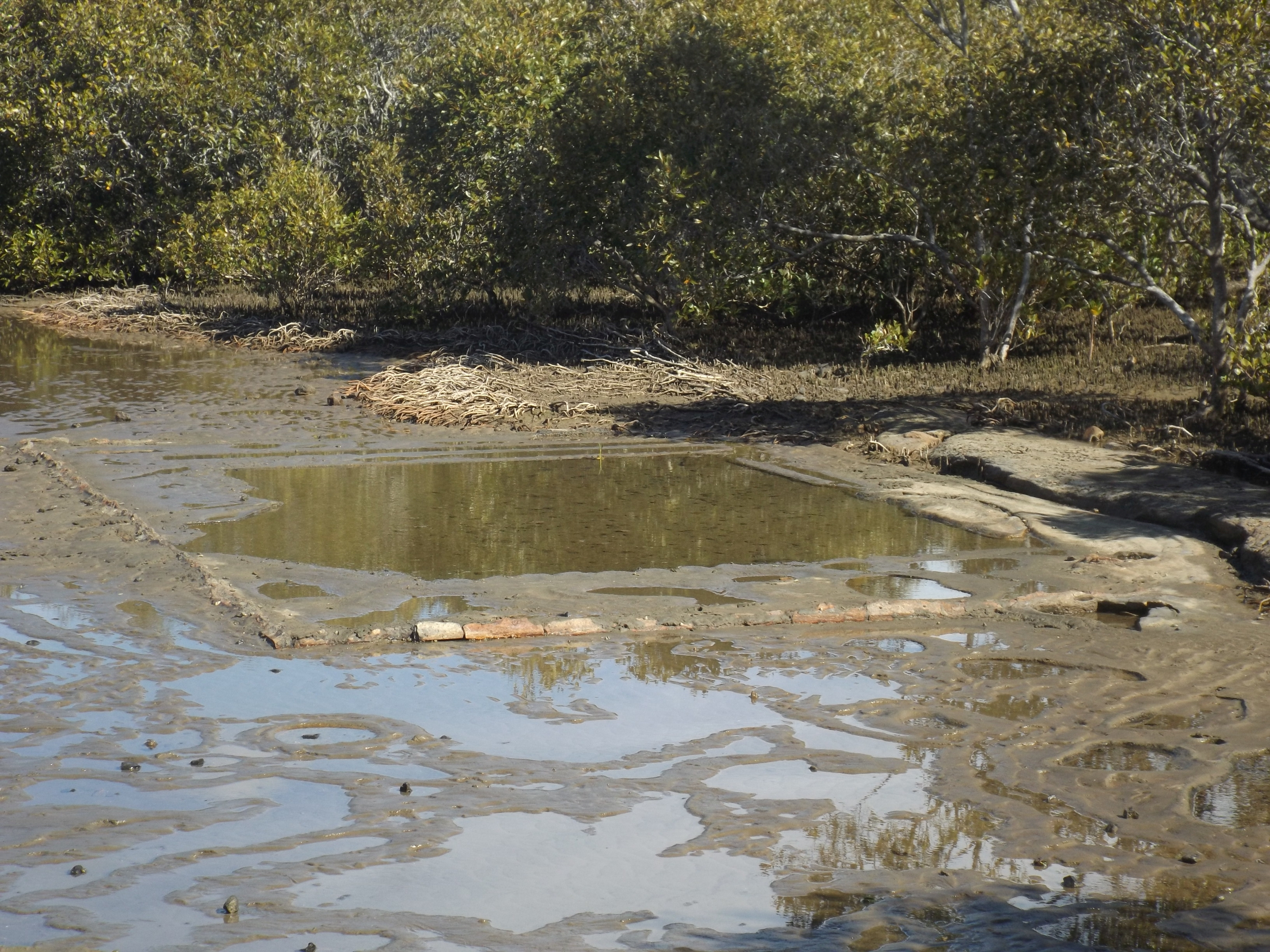
- Fisheries Bath, 2016

- Location within Queensland Location within Australia
- 27.1804°S 153.0302°E
- Location: Captain Cook Parade, Deception Bay, City of Moreton Bay, Queensland, Australia

History
- Design period: 1870s–1890s (late 19th century)
- Built: 1880s–1890s

Queensland Heritage Register
- Official name: Deception Bay Sea Baths, Bancroft Sea Baths
- Type: state heritage (archaeological, built, landscape)
- Designated: 4 July 2006
- Reference no.: 602509
- Significant period: 1880s–1890s (historical)
- Significant components: swimming/bathing enclosure, boardwalk, steps/stairway
- Builders: Joseph Bancroft

Deception Bay Sea Baths are heritage-listed swimming pools at Captain Cook Parade, Deception Bay, City of Moreton Bay, Queensland, Australia. They were built around the 1880s and 1890s by Joseph Bancroft. It is also known as Bancroft Sea Baths. It was added to the Queensland Heritage Register on 4 July 2006.

== History ==
The Deception Bay Sea Baths are two rectangular excavations in sandstone formations on the Deception Bay foreshore. The Fisheries Bath, measuring 4.3 by 2.7 metres (14.1 ft × 8.9 ft) is located in the inter-tidal zone about 20 metres (66 ft) east of the Department of Primary Industries Southern Fisheries Centre. The Boardwalk Bath measuring 3 by 1.8 metres (9.8 ft × 5.9 ft), is situated adjacent to the foreshore boardwalk near the intersection of Captain Cook Parade and Seymour Street. The baths were probably built by Joseph Bancroft in the 1880s or 1890s.

Closer settlement of Deception Bay commenced with the opening of the Redcliffe Agricultural Reserve for selection in March 1861. Prior to this, the area had formed part of pastoral runs. Selection of allotments at Deception Bay was slow. Access to the area was difficult because the roads were very poor and the bay was too shallow for navigation by large vessels. Moreover, much of the land was sandy and unsuitable for agriculture. Many of the first selectors soon abandoned their land. Joseph Bancroft was one of the early landholders who retained ownership and gradually expanded his holdings at Deception Bay.

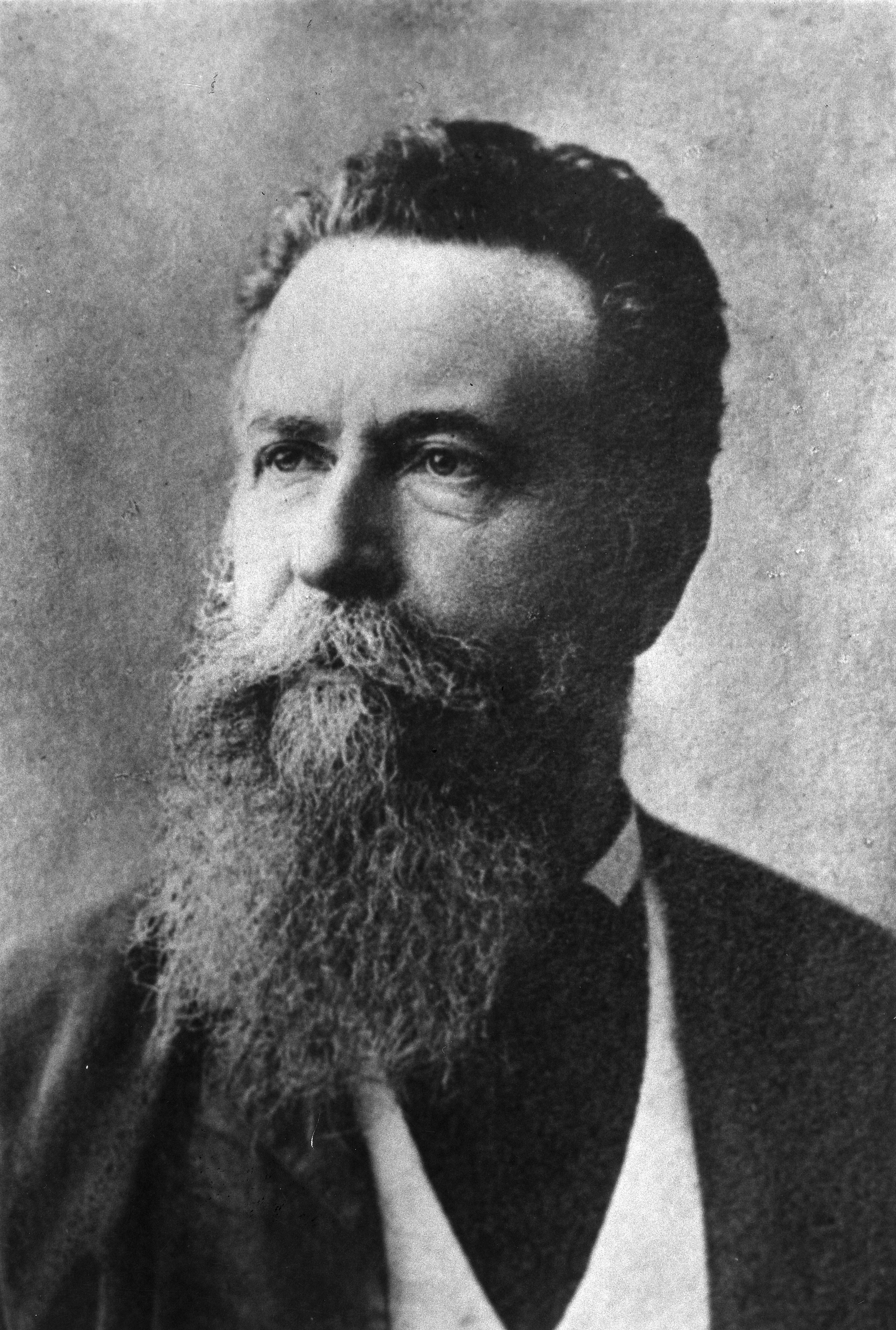
Dr Joseph Bancroft

Born and educated in England, Joseph had migrated to Queensland in 1864 and practised as a medical doctor in Brisbane. However, he and his son Thomas had an interest in science beyond medicine and became prominent figures within Queensland's broader scientific community. Joseph is recognised as a founder of medical research in Australia and the Bancroft Centre of the Queensland Institute of Medical Research is named in his honour. Joseph was president of many early scientific and medical organisations in Queensland including the Queensland Philosophical Society, the Medical Board, the Hygiene and Public Health section of the Australasian Association for the Advancement of Science and the Queensland branch of the British Medical Association, which later founded a Bancroft memorial lecture and medal in his honour. He made significant contributions to the field of agricultural entomology and plant pathology and together with Thomas, made outstanding contributions to the field of parasitology. Both men were avid naturalists who discovered many new species of fauna and flora. Thirteen Australian native trees and plants bear their name. They were internationally recognised for Joseph's discovery of the Wuchereria bancrofti parasitic worm, a cause of elephantiasis and Thomas's discovery that the parasite was transmitted by the Aedes aegypti mosquito. Much of their research was carried out at their Deception Bay property.

Joseph had property at Deception Bay by the early 1880s and by 1890, owned 1,500 hectares (3,700 acres). He lived at Wickham Terrace and visited his Deception Bay property with his family on weekends and holidays. At the bay, he pastured cattle, established a dried beef factory and experimented with rice crops and artificially cultivating pearls. He also used the property as a research station supporting his studies of botany and zoology.

The dried beef factory became profitable after Joseph's death in 1894 when the British War Office placed an order for the Bancroft's dried beef as a supplement to their emergency rations. Thomas moved to the bay with his new wife Cecilia and assumed management of the business. While living there, Thomas also carried out scientific research. It was there that he discovered how the Wucheria bancrofti was transmitted by mosquitoes. In 1904, after the dried beef factory ceased to be profitable, Thomas moved to Alderley in Brisbane and the factory was dismantled.

The Bancroft family believe that Joseph constructed the baths. Bancroft family members state that Joseph's wife, Ann, suffered with a chronic illness and that Joseph had the Boardwalk Bath shaped for her from natural tidal pools because she found that sea bathing helped her condition. This conclusion is supported by the relatively small size of the bath.

The Bancrofts may have used the Fisheries Bath, a larger structure, for recreational purposes. Low tide at Deception Bay leaves a broad expanse of mud that needs to be traversed in order to reach the water from the shore. The memoirs of C. Hamilton who, as a child, visited the property when the Bancrofts owned it, indicate that the bath was excavated so that Joseph could bathe when the tide was out. A photograph sourced from family members provides additional evidence that the Fisheries Bath existed when the Bancrofts lived at the bay. The photograph shows a woman believed by family members to be Joseph's half sister standing with her son next to the Bath. The family believe that the photograph dates to the late 19th Century.

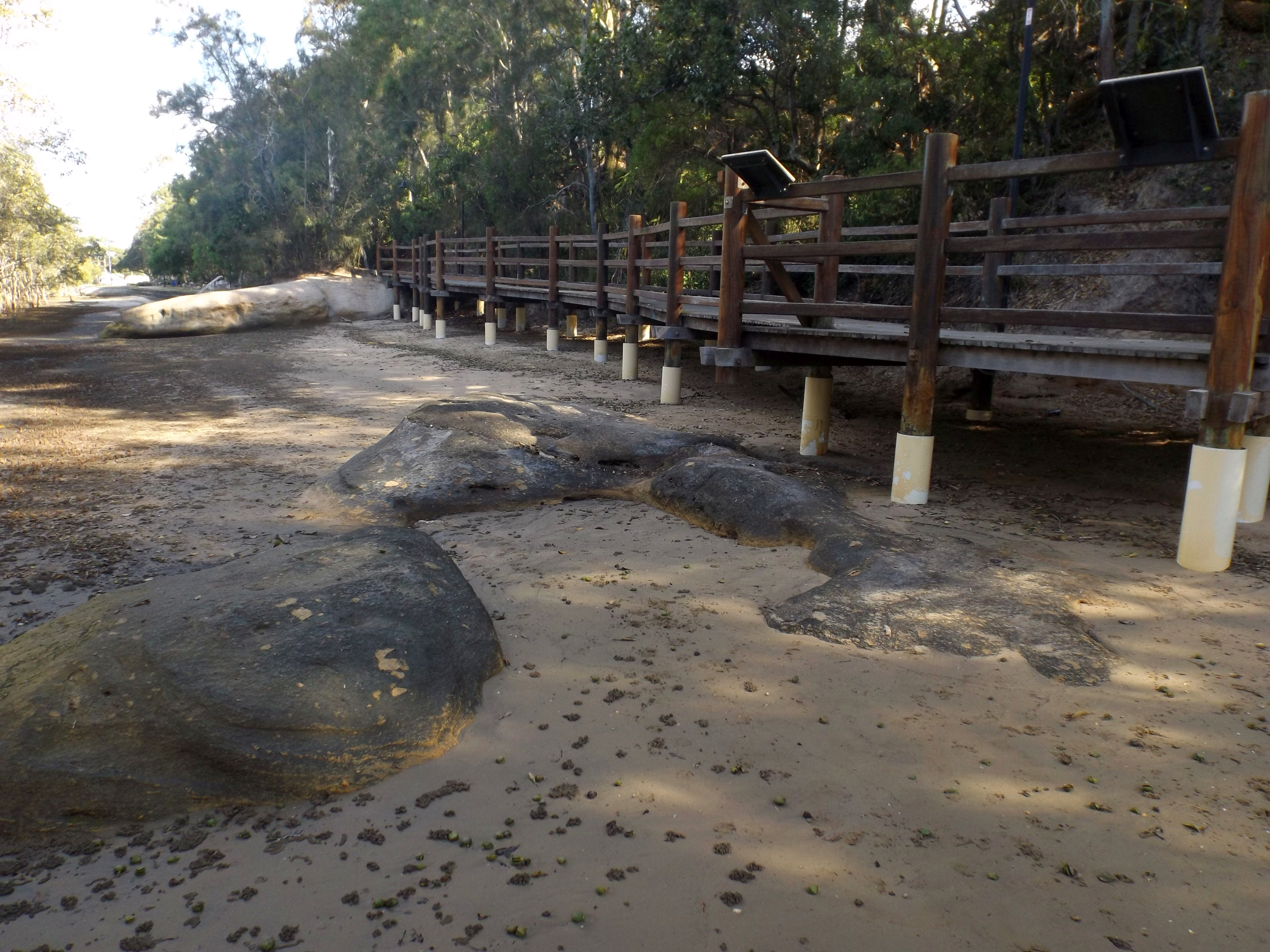
Boardwalk Bath, 2016

The Bancrofts' use of the sea baths for therapeutic and recreational uses is consistent with emerging notions about the seaside in the 19th Century. The western perception of the seaside as a place for recreation emerged between the late 18th and mid 19th Centuries. Bathing in the sea was also promoted for its health benefits and a new field of research and experimentation emerged around the therapeutic uses of the seaside. Especially near urban areas, people resorted to the seaside to escape the ills of increasingly industrialised urban living. Typically, netted enclosures and tidal baths were constructed to provide contained and safe swimming areas.

A number of artificial rock pools, dating to the late 19th Century and early 20th Century, exist in New South Wales, generally of a larger scale than the Deception Bay pools. Like the Deception Bay pools, they are formed by enhancing natural rock formations by excavation and the use of artificial walls. The Deception Bay tidal baths are believed to be the only surviving 19th Century baths of their type in Queensland.

A number of the Bancroft holdings were bought from Thomas by the Dunne brothers in the early 1900s. They pastured a dairy herd, grew some crops and established oyster leases along the foreshore. The sides of the Fisheries Bath show the remains of oysters and this suggests that the bath was used by the Dunne brothers to cultivate the shellfish.

The baths have been excavated a number of times. Due to their location within the inter-tidal zone, they fill with silt soon after excavation. In November 2004, an archaeological survey of the baths was completed in which each bath was recorded and analysed in detail.

== Description ==
=== Boardwalk Bath ===
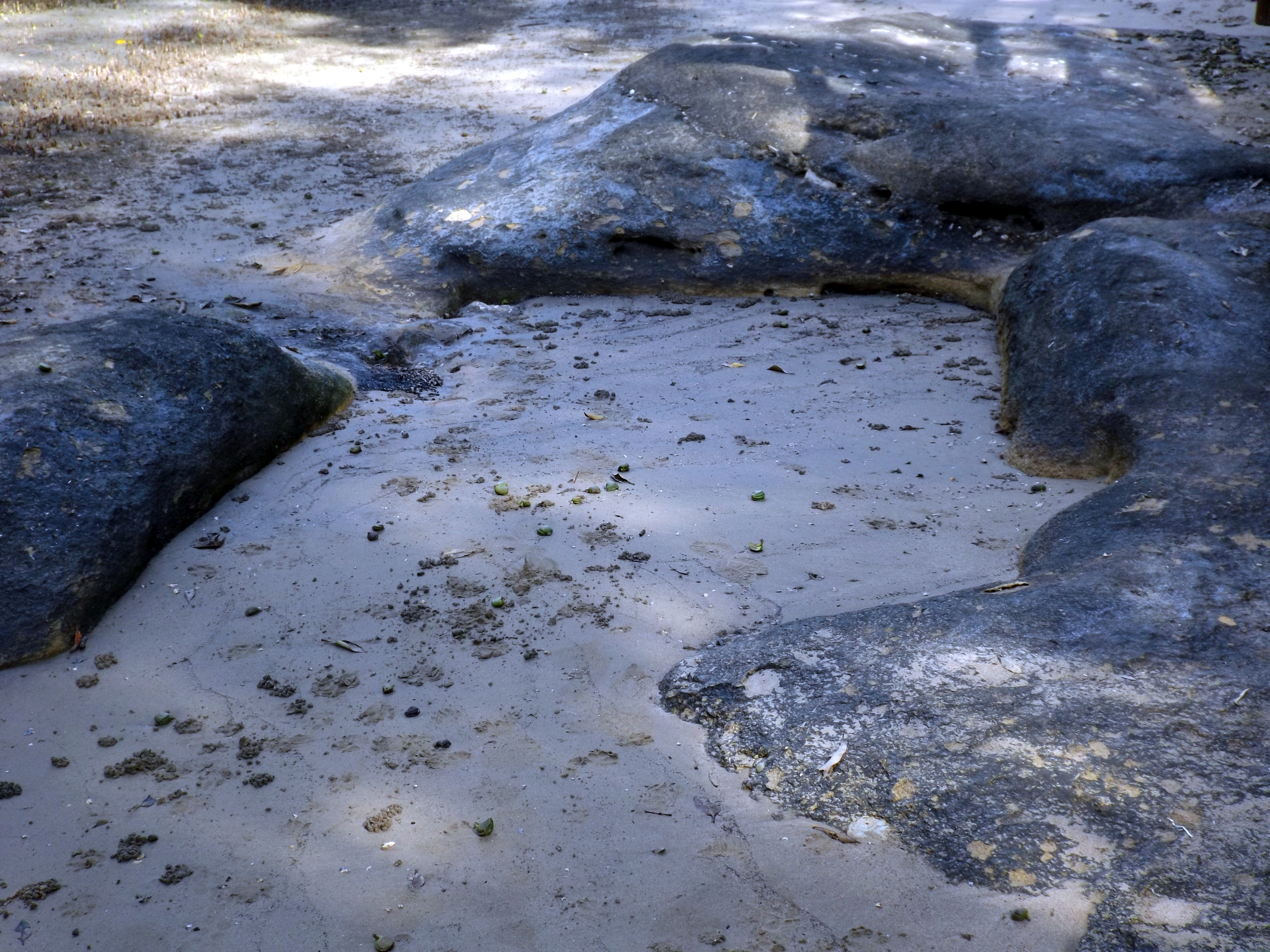
Both baths are in the intertidal zone so they quickly fill with silt

This bath is situated within an irregular shaped sandstone formation with a maximum length of 10 metres (33 ft) and width of 5 metres (16 ft). The formation rises to a height of about 1 metre (3 ft 3 in) above the sand. On the landward side of the formation is an elevated timber boardwalk and on the seaward side is an extensive stand of mangroves.

The bath is a rectangular shape cut into the sandstone formation, 3 metres (9.8 ft) in length and 1.8 metres (5 ft 11 in) wide. The floor of the bath is covered with a thin layer of cement rendering. Tool marks indicate the use of hand tools to excavate the bath.

The northern end of the bath comprises natural sandstone and a small brick wall. This wall has a height of 365 millimetres (14.4 in) (five courses of brick) and a width of 520 millimetres (20 in). At the base of the brick wall is a small drainpipe with an internal diameter of 50 millimetres (2.0 in). The internal side of the brick wall is formed into three steps.

=== Fisheries Bath ===
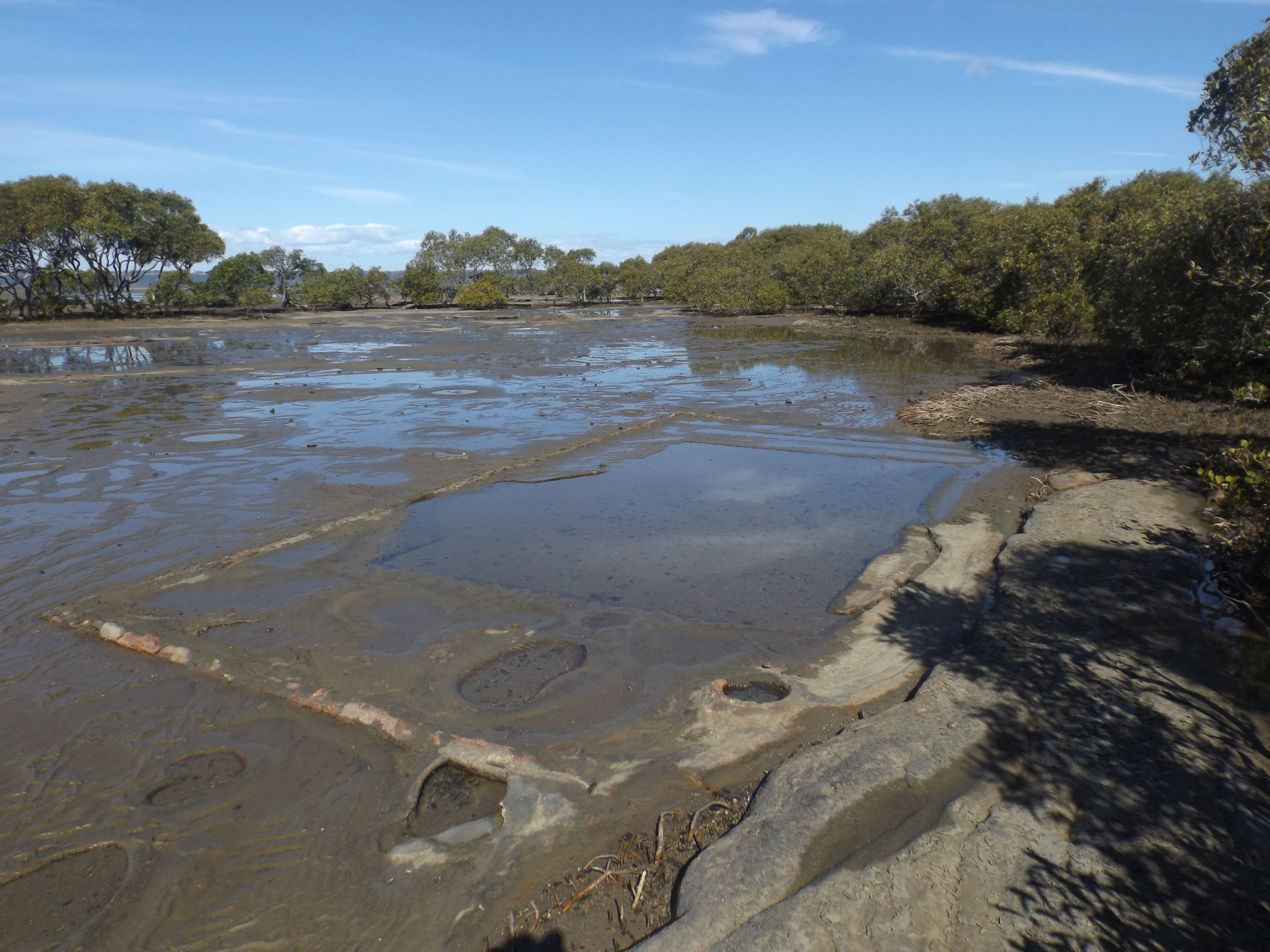
Fisheries Bath

The bath is a rectangular shape 4.3 metres (14 ft) long and 2.7 metres (8 ft 10 in) wide, with a triangular extrusion on the eastern side. This extrusion provides access to a semicircular ledge within the bath. The sides of the bath are generally perpendicular to an average depth of 1 metre (3 ft 3 in) with the exception of the ledge on the eastern side and a sloping triangular base on the northwestern corner. The base of the bath slopes to the deepest point of 1.3 metres (4 ft 3 in) off center on the southern end.

Brick edging surrounds the bath on the south (3.9 metres (13 ft)), east (7.7 metres (25 ft)) and northern (3.4 metres (11 ft)) sides. This edging is offset from the bath, 1.7 metres (5 ft 7 in) from the southern edge, .8 metres (26 ft) from the eastern edge, and 1.5 metres (4 ft 11 in) from the northern edge. These bricks vary in length between 290 to 305 millimetres (11.4 to 12.0 in) and a width of 110 millimetres (4.3 in). The bricks sit is a shallow trench cut into the sandstone and fixed with a lime mortar. The height of the bricks is weathered to no more than 40 millimetres (1.6 in).

The southeastern and northeastern extent of the bath is demarcated by two postholes cut into the sandstone. These holes are approximately 250 millimetres (9.8 in) in diameter. Another posthole demarcates the extent of the bath complex on the northwest. The western side of the bath complex is demarcated by a sandstone platform 100 millimetres (3.9 in) higher than the surrounds of the bath.

On the southern side of the bath is a shallow trough. This trough is 70 millimetres (2.8 in) in depth, 2.9 metres (9 ft 6 in) long and 250 millimetres (9.8 in) wide.

Notches to secure timber steps are located on the northern edge. After the 2004 survey, the remnants of the hardwood steps were left in the bath.

== Heritage listing ==
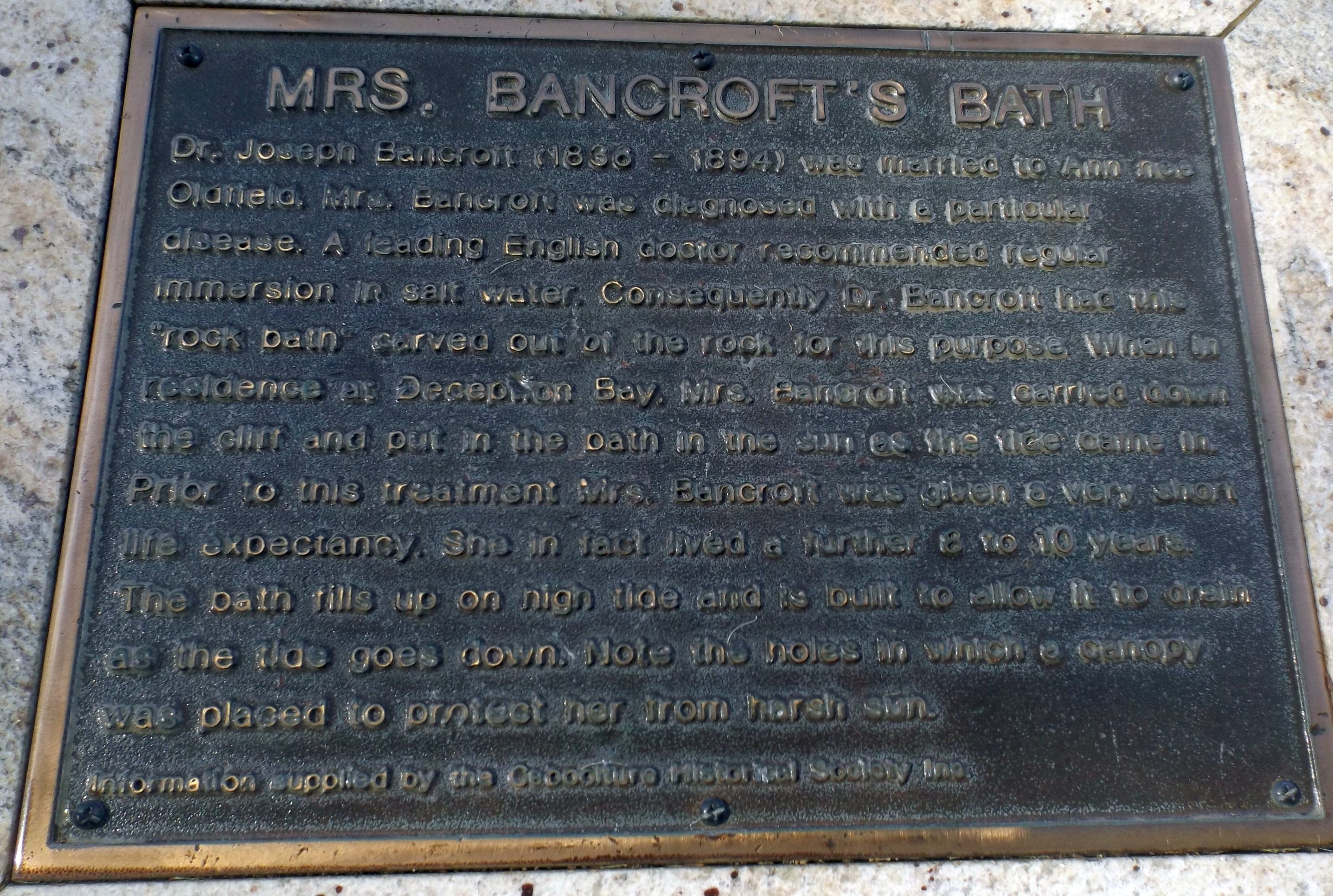
Plaque

Deception Bay Sea Baths was listed on the Queensland Heritage Register on 4 July 2006 having satisfied the following criteria.

The place is important in demonstrating the evolution or pattern of Queensland's history.

The Deception Bath Sea Baths are important in demonstrating the evolution of Queensland's history insofar that they provide physical evidence of the use of the seaside in Queensland for recreational and therapeutic purposes in the late 19th century. Oral and written accounts by the Bancroft family and the local community indicate that the baths were made and used by the Bancroft family in the 1880s and 1890s for recreational bathing and to relieve a chronic ailment suffered by Anne, the wife of Joseph Bancroft.

The place demonstrates rare, uncommon or endangered aspects of Queensland's cultural heritage.

The baths are uncommon surviving examples of 19th century sea baths. They are likely to be the only extant examples of their type in Queensland. Excavated from the sandstone in the inter-tidal zone of the Deception Bay foreshore, they were filled by the incoming tide. The Boardwalk Bath was drained via a pipe built into the bottom of the bath.

The place is important in demonstrating the principal characteristics of a particular class of cultural places.

The baths demonstrate the principal characteristics of sea baths and have a high degree of intactness. Like tidal baths in other parts of Australia, they are formed by enhancing natural rock formations in the intertidal zone. Similar to other enhanced rock pools, the Boardwalk Bath uses an artificial wall to enclose a natural opening of the pool at one end. Both pools are filled by the natural action of the tide and the Boardwalk Bath is drained through a pipe in the bottom of the artificial wall.

The place has a special association with the life or work of a particular person, group or organisation of importance in Queensland's history.

Both baths have special association with the lives of Joseph Bancroft and his son Thomas who reputedly built and used them. Joseph and Thomas were important Queensland research scientists of the late 19th Century and early 20th Century. Joseph is recognised as a founder of medical research in Australia. He was president of a number of early scientific and medical organisations in Queensland. Both men made important contributions to the fields of botany, zoology and medicine. They gained international recognition for Joseph's discovery of the Wucheria Bancrofti parasitic worm that is responsible for causing elephantiasis and Thomas's discovery that the parasite was transmitted by the Aedes aegypi mosquito. The Bancroft memorial lecture and medal, founded by the Queensland branch of the British Medical Association and also the Bancroft Centre of the Queensland Institute of Medical Research, are named in honour of Joseph.
