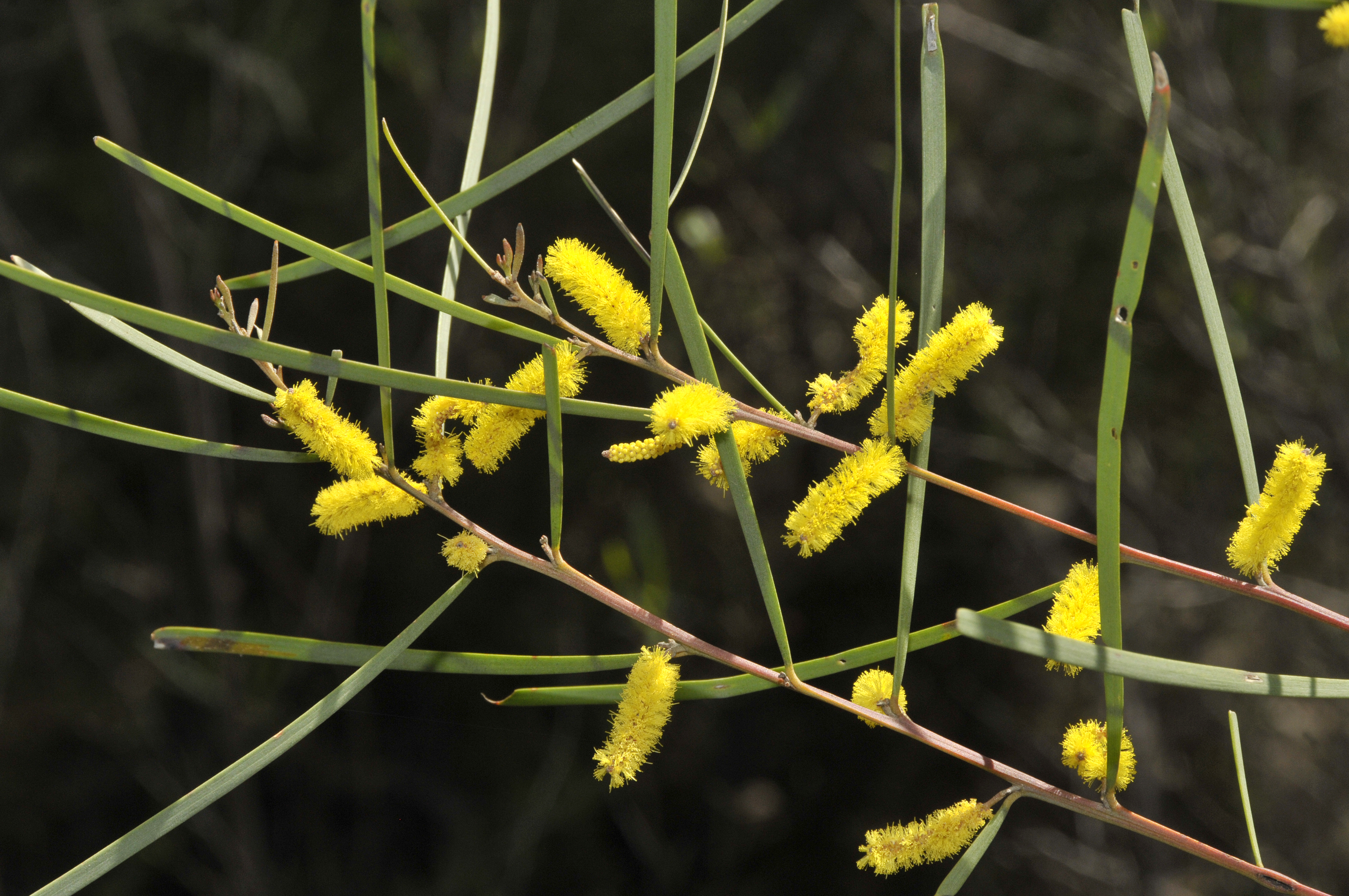

Scientific classification
- Kingdom: Plantae
- Clade: Tracheophytes
- Clade: Angiosperms
- Clade: Eudicots
- Clade: Rosids
- Order: Fabales
- Family: Fabaceae
- Subfamily: Caesalpinioideae
- Clade: Mimosoid clade
- Genus: Acacia
- Species: A. caroleae

Binomial name
- Acacia caroleae Pedley
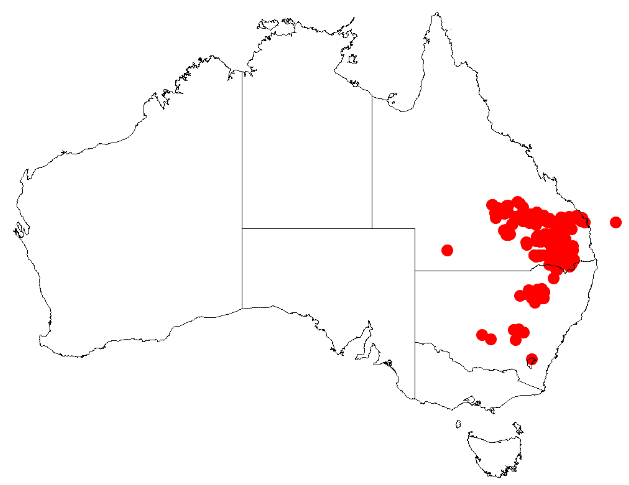
- Occurrence data from AVH

Synonyms
- Acacia doratoxylon var. angustifolia Maiden; Racosperma caroleae (Pedley) Pedley

= Acacia caroleae =

Carol's wattle

Species of plant

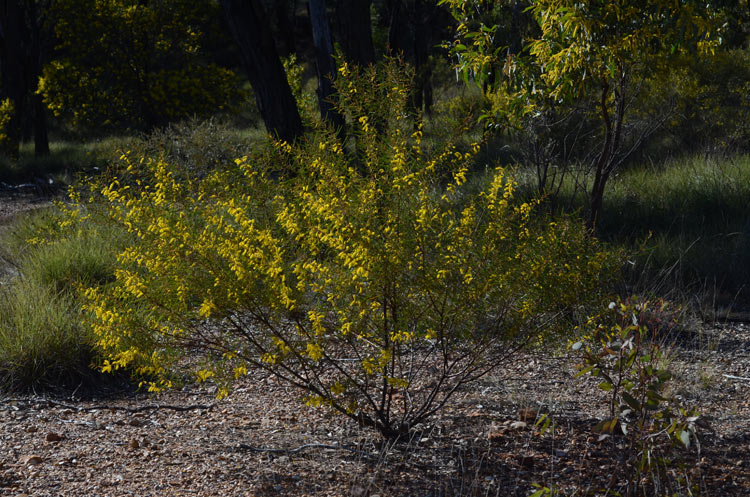
Habit near the Nogoa River

Acacia caroleae, commonly known as carol's wattle, carole's wattle or narrow-leaf currawong, or is a species of flowering plant in the family Fabaceae and is endemic to eastern Australia. It is an erect shrub or tree with many more or less parallel branches, fissured, dark grey bark, flat, linear phyllodes, spikes of golden yellow flowers, and oblong, wrinkled pods.

== Description ==
Acacia caroleae is an erect shrub or tree that typically grows to a height of up to 7 m (23 ft) and has many branches that grow more or less parallel to the main stem. It has dark grey bark that is corrugated and longitudinally fissured. The branchlets are a pinkish to dull purplish red, glabrous, angular and often resinous. Its phyllodes are linear, flat, 50–140 mm (2.0–5.5 in) long, 1.5–4 mm (0.059–0.157 in) wide and leathery with a conspicuous midvein. The flowers are golden yellow and borne in spikes 12–20 mm (0.47–0.79 in) long in racemes up to 20 mm (0.79 in) long. Flowering mainly occurs between August and October, and the pods are linear, wrinkled and glabrous 60–80 mm (2.4–3.1 in) long and raised over the oblong, dark, blackish brown seeds 4.0–4.5 mm (0.16–0.18 in) long.

== Taxonomy ==
This species was first formally described in 1920 by Joseph Maiden who gave it the name Acacia doratoxylon var. angustifolia in the Journal and Proceedings of the Royal Society of New South Wales from specimens collected by Thomas Lane Bancroft near Eidsvold. In 1978, Leslie Pedley raised the variety to species status as A. caroleae in the journal Austrobaileya. The specific epithet (caroleae) is named for Carole Pedley, the wife of Leslie Pedley.

== Distribution ==
Carol's wattle is widespread between Moura in central eastern Queensland to Gilgandra in central New South Wales, where it is found on hills and plains growing in sandy and alluvial soils. It is commonly found in disturbed areas and as a part of open Eucalyptus woodland or forest communities that are often dominated by species of Callitris.

== See also ==
- List of Acacia species
