= Deception Bay State High School =

Location
- Deception Bay, Queensland; Australia; 27.2009°S 153.0307°E

Information
- Type: Public, co-educational, secondary, day school
- Motto: Empowering Learners to Thrive
- Established: 1992
- Principal: Goldy Sodhi
- Colours: Maroon, white and black
- Website: deceptionbayshs.eq.edu.au

Deception Bay State High School is a public, co-educational, high school, located in the City of Moreton Bay suburb of Deception Bay, in Queensland, Australia. It is administered by the Department of Education, with an enrolment of 1,361 students and a teaching staff of 88, as of 2023. The school serves students from Year 7 to Year 12.

== History ==
Prior to the schools opening, the land was a plantation of pine trees, the school opened on 1 January 1992.

In September 2008, it was believed the school was one of many locations of a cancer cluster, due to eleven staff members contracting cancer within the past few years, with three cases being diagnosed since November the previous year. Two of the eleven cases, however, were pre-existing before the staff members arrived at the school. It was investigated by the Queensland Government after the cases had been identified and was declared safe in December 2008, after finding no evidence of contamination in the soil, water or the air. If it would have deemed unsafe, the school would have been abandoned.

== See also ==
- List of schools in Queensland
