= Deception Bay, Queensland =

Deception Bay
- Suburb
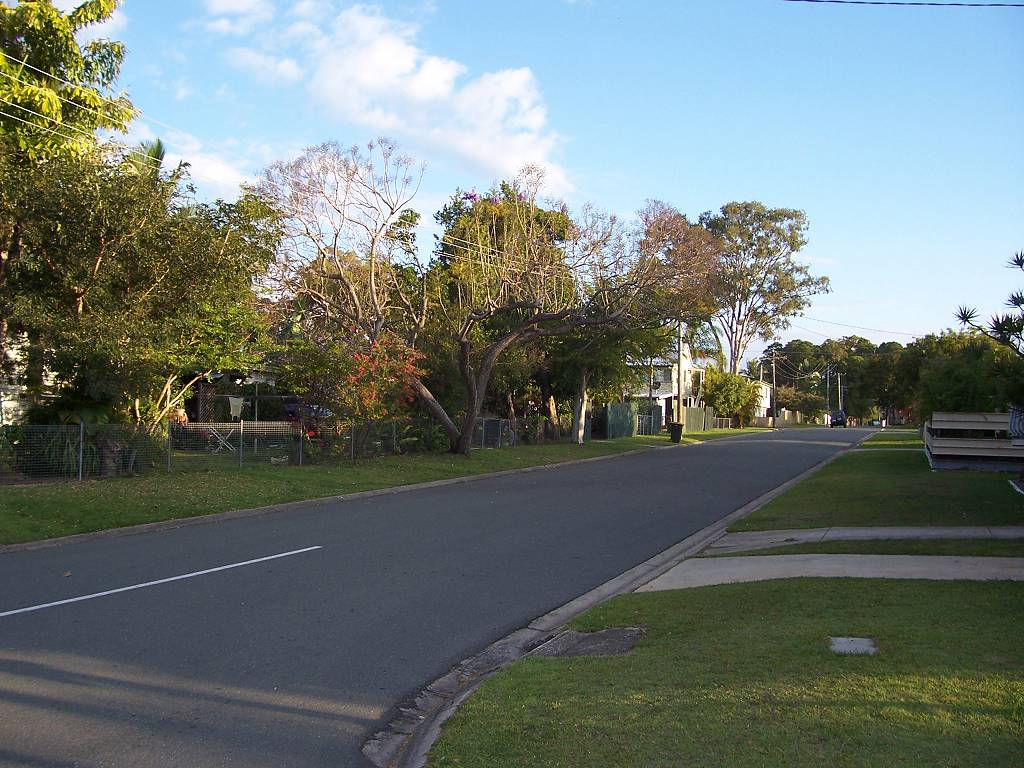
- Residential area in Deception Bay

- Interactive map of Deception Bay
- Coordinates: 27.1819°S 153.0130°E
- Country: Australia
- State: Queensland
- City: Moreton Bay
- LGA: City of Moreton Bay
- Location: 10.8 km (6.7 mi) WNW of Redcliffe; 36.8 km (22.9 mi) N of Brisbane CBD

Government
  - State electorate: Bancroft
  - Federal division: Petrie

Area
  - Total: 19.2 km^{2} (7.4 sq mi)

Population
  - Total: 19,573 (2021 census)
  - Density: 1,019.4/km^{2} (2,640/sq mi)
- Time zone: UTC+10:00 (AEST)
- Postcode: 4508
Suburbs around Deception Bay
| Burpengary | Burpengary East | Deception Bay |
| Burpengary | Deception Bay | Deception Bay |
| Narangba | North Lakes | Rothwell |

Deception Bay is a coastal suburb in the City of Moreton Bay, Queensland, Australia. In the 2021 census, Deception Bay had a population of 19,573 people.

== Geography ==
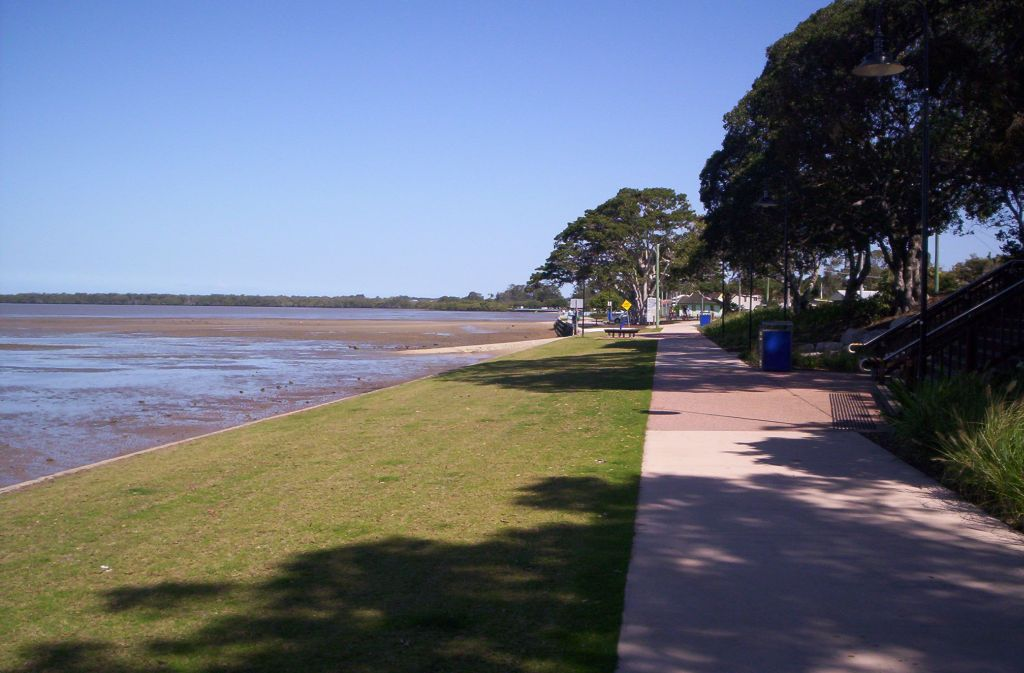
Beachfront pathway

It is approximately 32 kilometres (20 mi) north of Brisbane CBD in the south-eastern corner of the bay of the same name which separates the Redcliffe Peninsula and Bribie Island.

The suburb of Deception Bay takes its name from a small bay in the west of Moreton Bay, south of Pumicestone Passage and north of the Redcliffe Peninsula. In the north of the bay at Beachmere is where the Caboolture River and Burpengary Creek meet the ocean. It was named in 1823 by Lieutenant John Oxley, who thought the bay was a river and because of his mistake and the shallowness, named it Pumice Stone River; he later changed the name to Deception Bay.

== History ==
The area's rich history dates back to the Traditional Custodians of the land, the Gubbi Gubbi people, and later to early penal settlement.

Deception Bay was so named by Lieutenant John Oxley in 1823 who thought the bay was a river and because of his mistake and the shallowness, named it Deception Bay. Today, Deception Bay is often listed as an unusual place name.

The area was once large parcels of land supporting dairying and farming and, while some large blocks remain today, most have been subdivided to provide housing for a growing community.

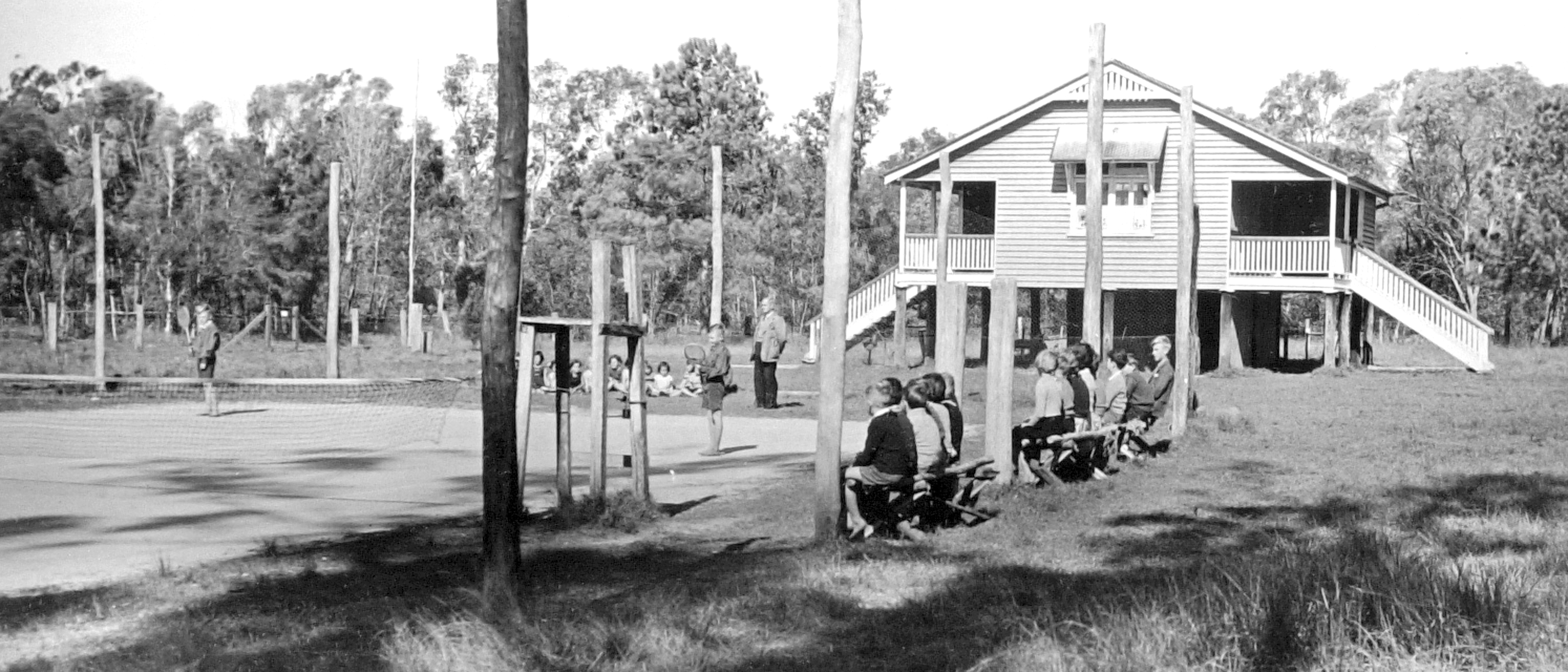
Deception Bay State School, a typical one-teacher school, April 1951

Deception Bay Provisional School opened on 7 November 1892. It closed circa 1905. It reopened on 14 October 1929 and became Deception Bay State School in 1932.

On Saturday 23 October 1948, Deception Bay Methodist Church was officially opened by Reverend Reginald Sholto Cecil Dingle, the President of the Methodist Conference. It became the Deception Bay Uniting Church after the amalgamation of the Methodist Church into the Uniting Church in Australia in 1977.

On Sunday 21 July 1963 a monument was unveiled to commemorate to scientist Joseph Bancroft and his son Thomas Lane Bancroft in Bancroft Park on Captain Cook Parade, (27.1791°S 153.0290°E). Much of their research was conducted at Deception Bay. The monument was erected by the Queensland branch of the Australian Medical Association, the Caboolture Shire Council, and the Caboolture Historical Society. Joseph Bancroft was a pioneer in experimenting in native plants for their health properties and, through his meatworks, in the preservation of meat, fish and vegetables. His son, Thomas Lane Bancroft, carried on the tradition with some work in cultivating cotton and castor oil. A rough-hewn pyramidal block of granite stands today on the foreshore highlighting the achievements of these two doctors, and the streets around Dr Bancroft's home, Joseph Street and Bancroft Terrace, are named in his honour.

The Deception Bay public library opened in 1978.

Deception Bay North State School opened on 30 January 1979.

Christ the King Catholic Primary School opened on 31 January 1979.

During the 1980s and 1990s, the suburb acquired a negative reputation due to crime and high unemployment. However, community problems subsided after 2001 following the construction of a police station and a property boom.

Deception Bay State High School opened in January 1992.

Moreton Downs State School opened on 27 January 1995.

Deception Bay Flexible Learning Centre opened on 23 January 2006.

On 15 March 2008, Deception Bay became a suburb of a new amalgamated local government area, the Moreton Bay Region (now known as the City of Moreton Bay). For local government elections, Deception Bay divided into two divisions, with the area of the suburb falling north of Deception Bay Road becoming a part of Division 2.

In the past few years, a walkway, several staircases, and CCCTV have been installed to improve access to the waterfront area. The suburb contains low-density urban and semi-rural property types.

== Demographics ==
In the 2011 census, Deception Bay recorded a population of 19,672 people, 51.1% female and 48.9% male. The median age of the Deception Bay population was 34 years, 3 years below the national median of 37. 73.6% of people living in Deception Bay were born in Australia. The other top responses for country of birth were New Zealand 6.7%, England 4.2%, Philippines 1%, Samoa 1% and Scotland 0.4%. 86.3% of people spoke only English at home; the next most common languages were 2.1% Samoan, 0.3% Tagalog, 0.3% Filipino, 0.3% Hindi and 0.2% Mandarin.

In the 2016 census, Deception Bay had a population of 19,850 people.

In the 2021 census, Deception Bay had a population of 19,573 people.

== Heritage listings ==
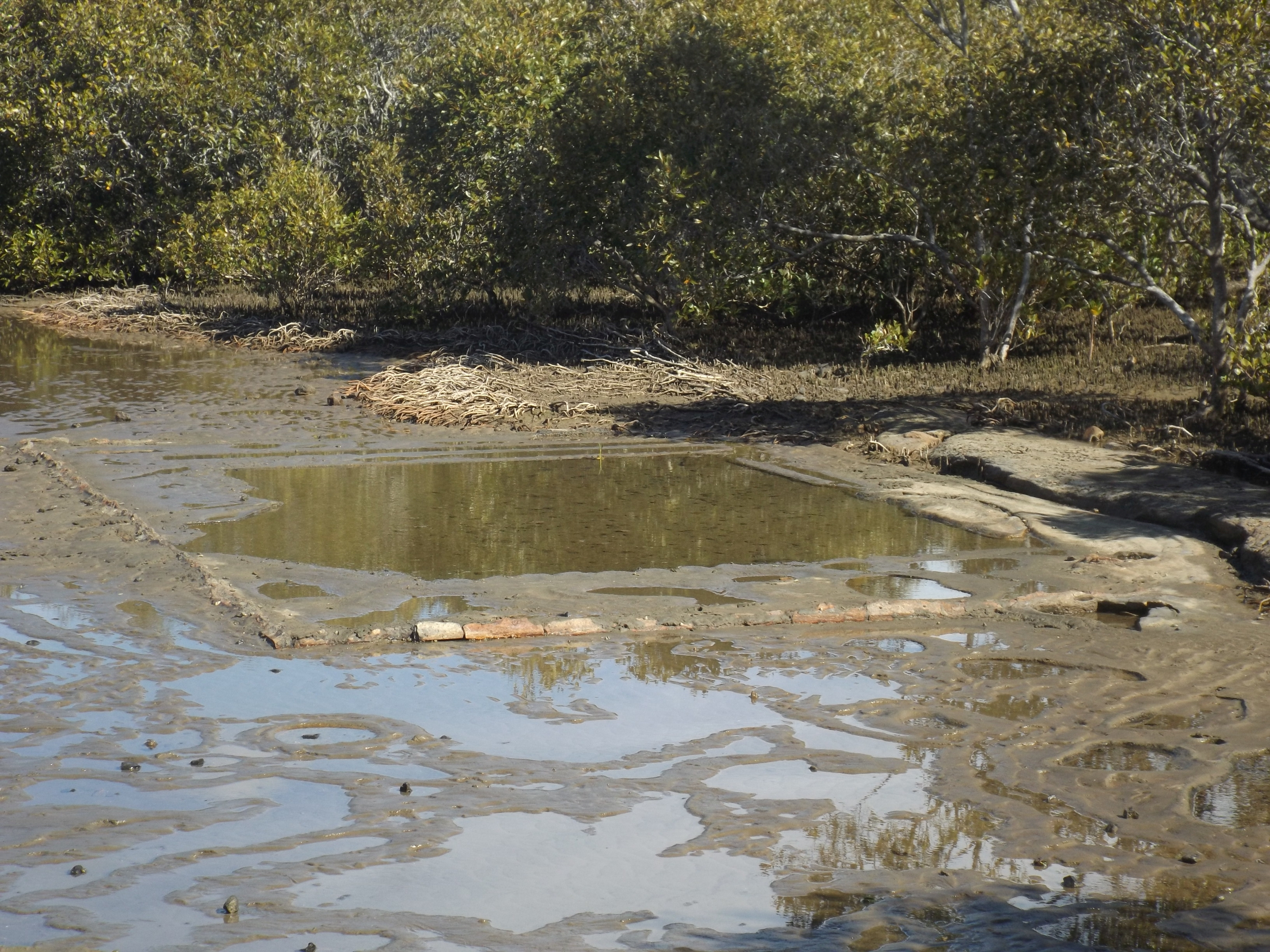
Fisheries Bath, one of the Deception Bay Sea Baths, 2016

Deception Bay also has a number of heritage-listed sites, including:

- Deception Bay Sea Baths, Captain Cook Parade

Significant parts of Deception Bay’s heritage have been captured in the Deception Bay Heritage Trail which describes Aboriginal traditional lifestyle and culture and the early days of settlement.

== Environment ==
Deception Bay makes up a sizeable portion of the Moreton Bay Ramsar internationally important wetland area. The Moreton Bay Ramsar site is home to more than 20,000 migratory shorebirds who in 2009 accounted for more than one percent of the world’s population of eight species of shorebirds.

There area two conservation parks: Deception Bay Conservation Park in the north and Hays Inlet Conservation Park 2 in the south.

Deception Bay along with the neighbouring areas of Redcliffe and Bribie Island support over 50% of the shorebirds in Moreton Bay. The northern area of the Moreton Bay RAMSAR site has large areas of intertidal feeding habitat and suitable adjacent roosting habitats for shorebirds.

== Education ==
Deception Bay State School is a government primary (Prep–6) school for boys and girls at King Street (27.1906°S 153.0294°E). In 2018, the school had an enrolment of 349 students with 31 teachers (25 full-time equivalent) and 25 non-teaching staff (15 full-time equivalent). It includes a special education program.

Deception Bay North State School is a government primary (Early Childhood–6) school for boys and girls at Old Bay Road (27.1811°S 153.0165°E). In 2018, the school had an enrolment of 455 students with 41 teachers (36 full-time equivalent) and 32 non-teaching staff (22 full-time equivalent). It includes a special education program.

Moreton Downs State School is a government primary (Prep–6) school for boys and girls at Parsons Boulevard (27.2001°S 153.0172°E). In 2018, the school had an enrolment of 641 students with 49 teachers (45 full-time equivalent) and 30 non-teaching staff (19 full-time equivalent). It includes a special education program.

Christ the King Catholic Primary School is a Catholic primary (Prep–6) school for boys and girls at 54 Thompson Street (27.1804°S 153.0208°E). In 2018, the school had an enrolment of 290 students with 20 teachers (19 full-time equivalent) and 23 non-teaching staff (15 full-time equivalent).

Deception Bay State High School is a government secondary (7–12) school for boys and girls at Phillip Parade (27.1999°S 153.0305°E). In 2018, the school had an enrolment of 1097 students with 87 teachers (83 full-time equivalent) and 57 non-teaching staff (40 full-time equivalent). It includes a special education program.

Deception Bay Flexible Learning Centre is a Catholic secondary (7–12) school for boys and girls at Cnr Grosvenor Terrace & Silver Street (27.1910°S 153.0301°E). In 2018, the school had an enrolment of 133 students with 13 teachers (12 full-time equivalent) and 12 non-teaching staff (9 full-time equivalent).

Arethusa College is a private secondary (7–12) school for boys and girls at 83 Deception Bay Road (27.1784°S 152.9868°E). In 2018, the school had an enrolment of 236 students with 29 teachers (25 full-time equivalent) and 41 non-teaching staff (21 full-time equivalent). The school provides flexible education and vocational training for students who have failed to thrive in mainstream schooling. It also has campuses in Spring Hill and Windsor.

Kairos Community College is a private secondary (10–12) school for boys and girls at 100–166 Maine Terrace (27.1923°S 153.0269°E). In 2018, the school had an enrolment of 53 students with 5 teachers and 5 non-teaching staff.

== Amenities ==
The Moreton Bay City Council operates a public library in Deception Bay at 9 Bayview Terrace.

Deception Bay Uniting Church is at 64-70 Webster Road (corner of Deception Bay Road, 27.2017°S 153.0358°E).

== Transport ==
The only mode of public transport in Deception Bay is bus with all services traveling ether via or to/from the Deception Bay Bus Station located outside MKT Deception Bay at 1 Bay Avenue (27.1943°S 153.0300°E).

Bus route 662 completes a loop around the northern section of Deception Bay and connects to train services at Rothwell railway station. Bus route 665 travels from Deception Bay Bus Station to Rothwell via the southern portion of Deception Bay providing a bus connection to Rothwell railway station. The 660 bus also travels through Deception Bay connecting to other services at Deception Bay Bus Station providing connections to Redcliffe, Caboolture, Burpengary and Morayfield.

== See also ==
- Redcliffe Peninsula road network
