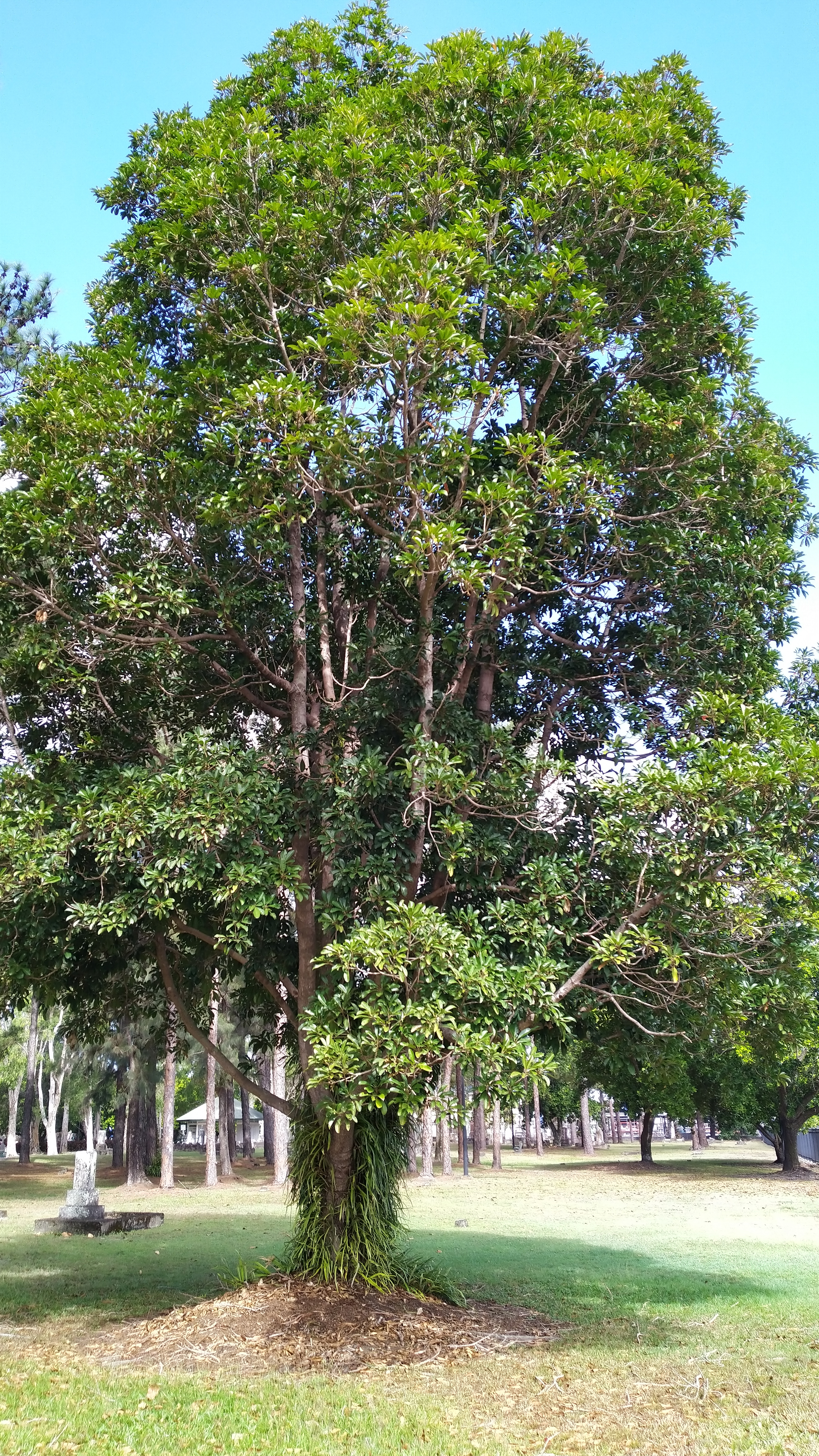
- Specimen growing in the Cairns Pioneer Cemetery

Conservation status
- Least Concern (IUCN 3.1)
- Least Concern (NCA)

Scientific classification
- Kingdom: Plantae
- Clade: Tracheophytes
- Clade: Angiosperms
- Clade: Eudicots
- Clade: Rosids
- Order: Oxalidales
- Family: Elaeocarpaceae
- Genus: Elaeocarpus
- Species: E. bancroftii

Binomial name
- Elaeocarpus bancroftii F.Muell. & F.M.Bailey
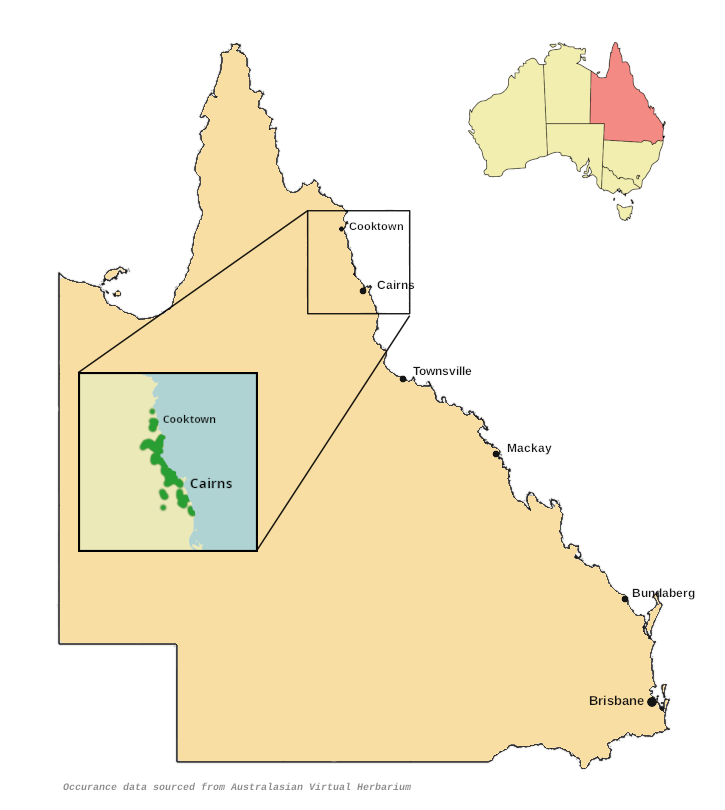

= Elaeocarpus bancroftii =

Kuranda quandong

Species of tree endemic to Queensland, Australia

Elaeocarpus bancroftii, commonly known as Kuranda quandong, Johnstone River almond, ebony heart, grey nut, or nut tree is a large rainforest tree in the family Elaeocarpaceae which is endemic to Queensland, Australia. It has coriaceous (thick but flexible) leaves, attractive white flowers and relatively large fruit containing an edible kernel.

== Description ==
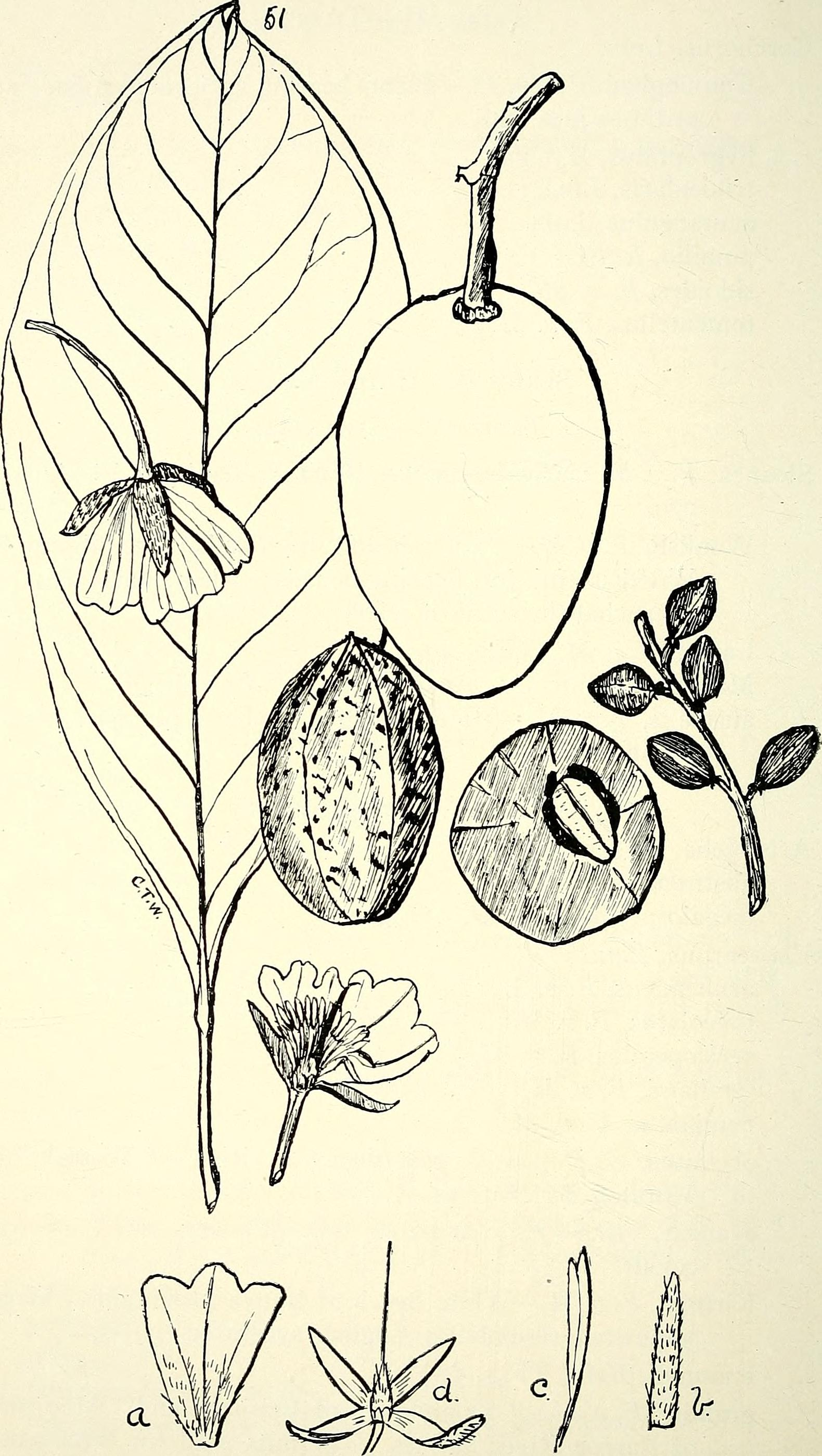
Sketch from 1909, showing (a) Petal, (b) calyx-lobe, (c) stamen, (d) calyx and pistil

Elaeocarpus bancroftii is a large tree growing up to 30 m (98 ft) in height and up to 60 cm (24 in) diameter, and may be buttressed. It has scaly brown bark on the trunk and dense foliage.

The rather stiff leaves are ovate to ovate-lanceolate in overall shape and have entire to crenate margins. The petiole is relatively long, up to 45 mm (1.8 in), somewhat swollen at both ends, and has a velvety texture. Leaf blades measure up to 13 cm (5.1 in) long and 5 cm (2.0 in) wide, with between 5 and 8 secondary veins on either side of the rachis, or midrib. On the upper surface they are dark green and glabrous with the midrib slightly raised and secondary veins apparent, while the underside is dull green with both the midrib and secondary venation distinctly raised and the tertiary veins feint. The leaf tip is acute to obtuse, and the base is cuneate, i.e. tapering into the petiole or leaf-stem. Like many other species of Elaeocarpus, the leaves turn bright red before falling.

The inflorescences are axillary or ramiflorous umbels produced towards the ends of the twigs and carry a small number (less than 10) of individual flowers. The peduncle and pedicels (stems of the inflorescence and individual flowers, respectively) are velvety.

The flowers are tetramerous (i.e. having four sepals and petals). The sepals are creamy yellow in colour and measure up to 10 mm (0.4 in) long—the white petals have 3 rounded lobes at the end and are 15–25 mm (0.6–1.0 in) long. There are between 45 and 50 stamens in each. Flowering occurs from March to June.

The fruit is a large, dull grey or blue/green, globular drupe, (Note: Commonly known drupes include apricots, olives, plums, cherries and mangoes) about 4 cm (1.6 in) in diameter with a sturdy pedicel measuring around 10 by 15 mm (0.4 by 0.6 in) and contains a stone with a very hard, thick endocarp. The stone is shaped like a Rugby ball and has four segments (again like the rugby ball) that are clearly evident but difficult to separate. The outer surface of the stone is generally smooth but punctate (i.e. marked with numerous small pits). Within the stone is a solitary elongated seed.

== Taxonomy ==
E. bancroftii was first formally described in 1886 by the German-born botanist Ferdinand von Mueller, in consultation with Frederick Manson Bailey, and published in Proceedings of the Royal Society of Queensland. His description was based on plant specimens collected on the Johnstone River by Thomas Lane Bancroft.

=== Etymology ===
The genus name Elaeocarpus is derived from the Greek words ελιά (eliá) meaning 'olive', and καρπός (karpós) meaning 'fruit'. It refers to the superficial similarity of the fruits of the two taxa. The species epithet is in honour of the collector.

== Distribution and habitat ==
This species is endemic to north-eastern Queensland, where it is widespread and grows in well-developed rainforest. Its range is from near Cooktown southwards to about Tully, and at elevations from near sea level to around 1,200 m (3,900 ft). It is found in most parts of the Wet Tropics of Queensland World Heritage Area.

== Ecology ==
Fruits are eaten by cassowaries (Casuarius casuarius) and Spectacled flying foxes (Pteropus conspicillatus). Both of these species help to disperse the seeds, but by very different methods. While the cassowary will easily swallow the fruit and pass the stone out in its droppings, the fruit is too large for the flying fox to swallow. Instead, it will typically pluck the fruit from a tree and fly with it to another location where it will discard the stone after eating the flesh.

The seeds within the stone are eaten by native rats, notably the giant white-tailed rat (Uromys caudimaculatus) which, due to its size and formidable incisors, is able to gnaw through the hardened endocarp to access the seed.

== Conservation status ==
This species has been assessed as least concern by both the Queensland Government under the Nature Conservation Act 1992, and by the IUCN.

== Uses ==
Indigenous Australians ate the seeds, although the very hard shell required them to use stones to crack them open. These special "nut stones", which had a groove or hollow in which the nut was placed, along with the accompanying "hammer stones", have been found throughout Queensland as forests were cleared during the expansion of European settlement.

The 1889 book The Useful Native Plants of Australia records that "The cotyledons or 'kernels' have a good flavour, and are eaten by the settlers. Other species of Elaeocarpus have fruits which are more or less useful in this respect."

== Cultivation ==
Elaeocarpus bancroftii is considered to have good horticultural potential, particularly for parks and larger areas, because of the attractive foliage, showy flowers and interesting fruit. In the city of Cairns in far north Queensland, six of these trees have been planted in the streets. It can be purchased from many plant nurseries and native plant specialists in Australia.

== Gallery ==
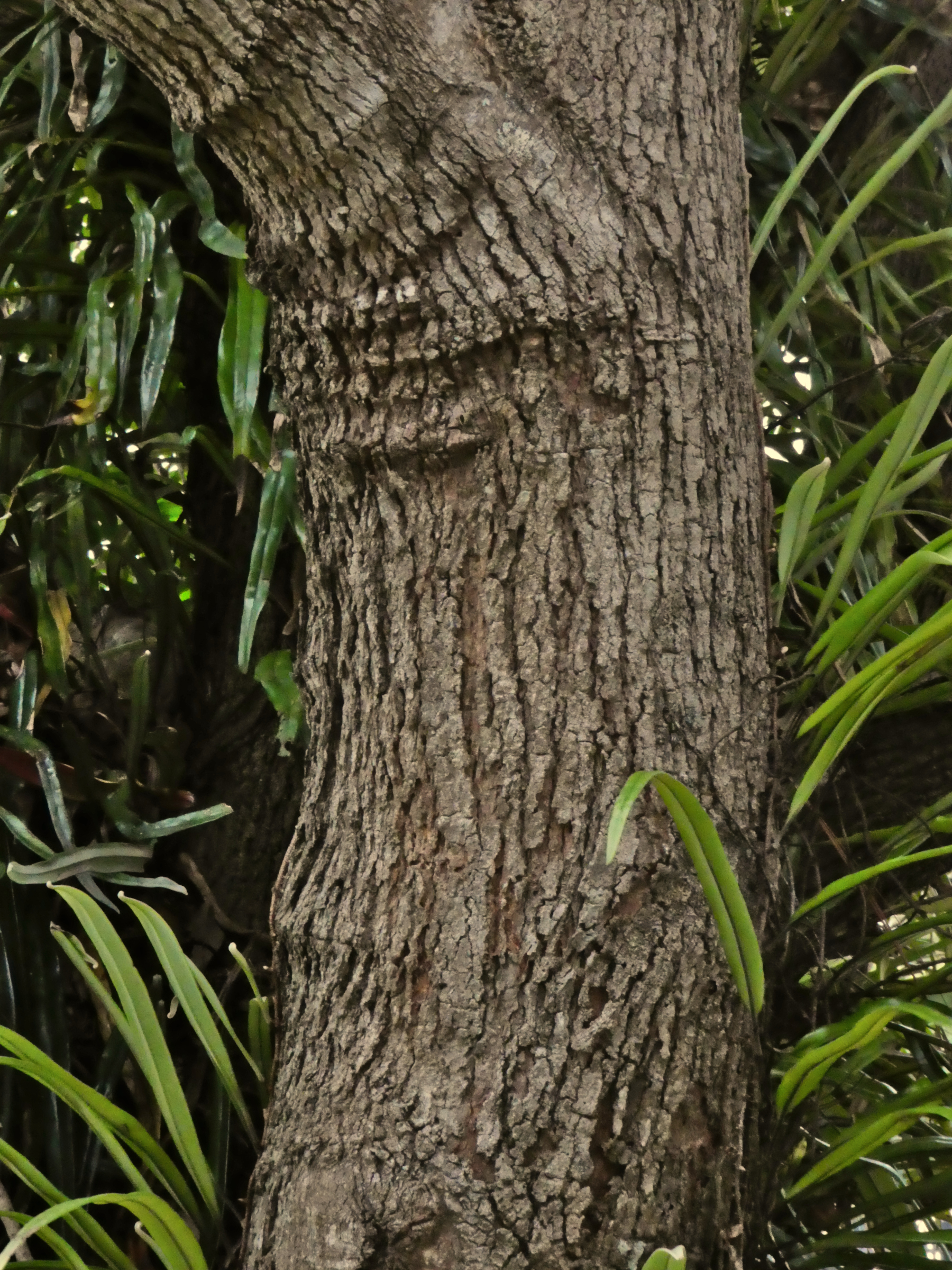
Trunk, showing rough bark

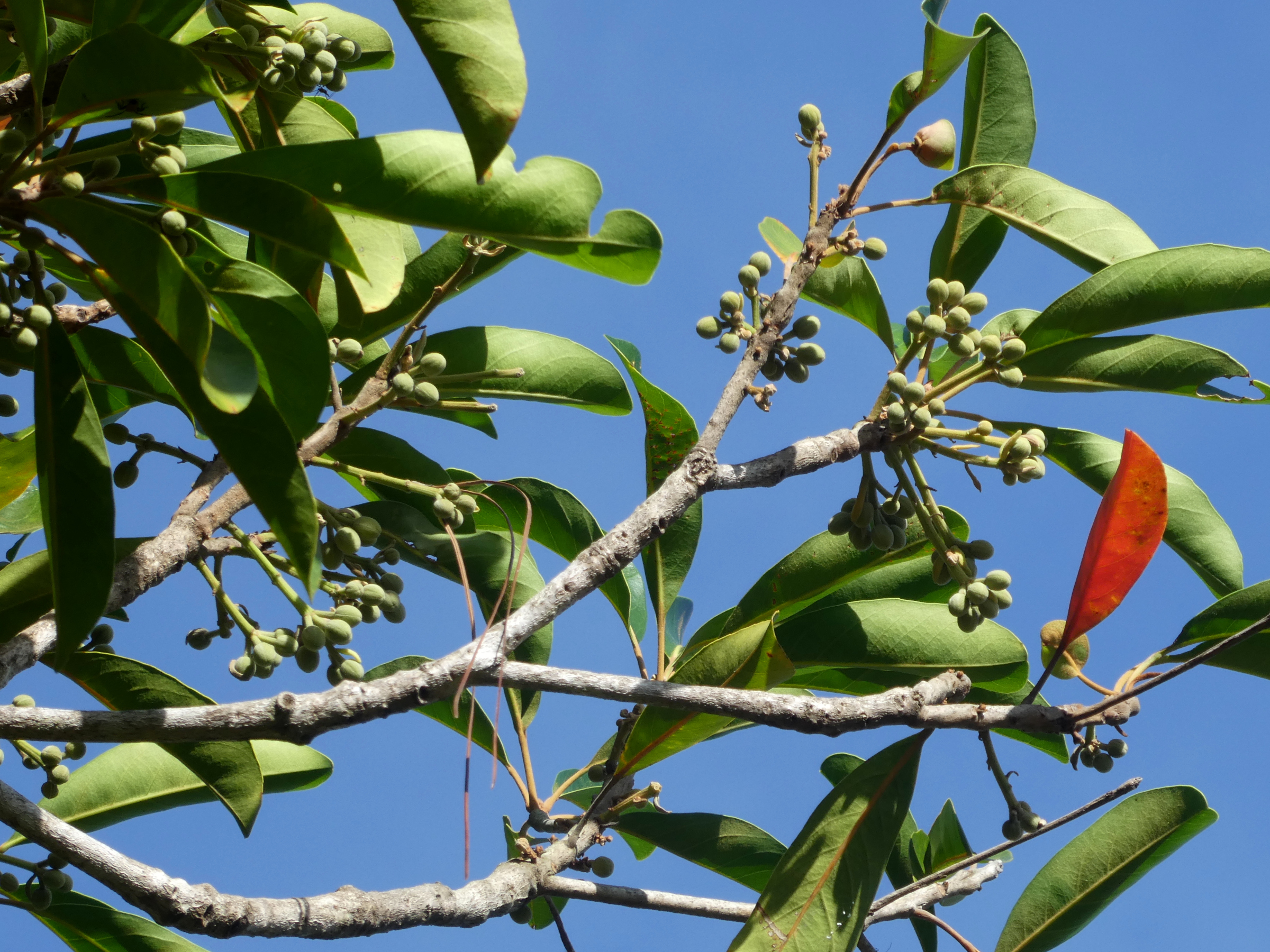
Flower buds, about 2 weeks prior to opening

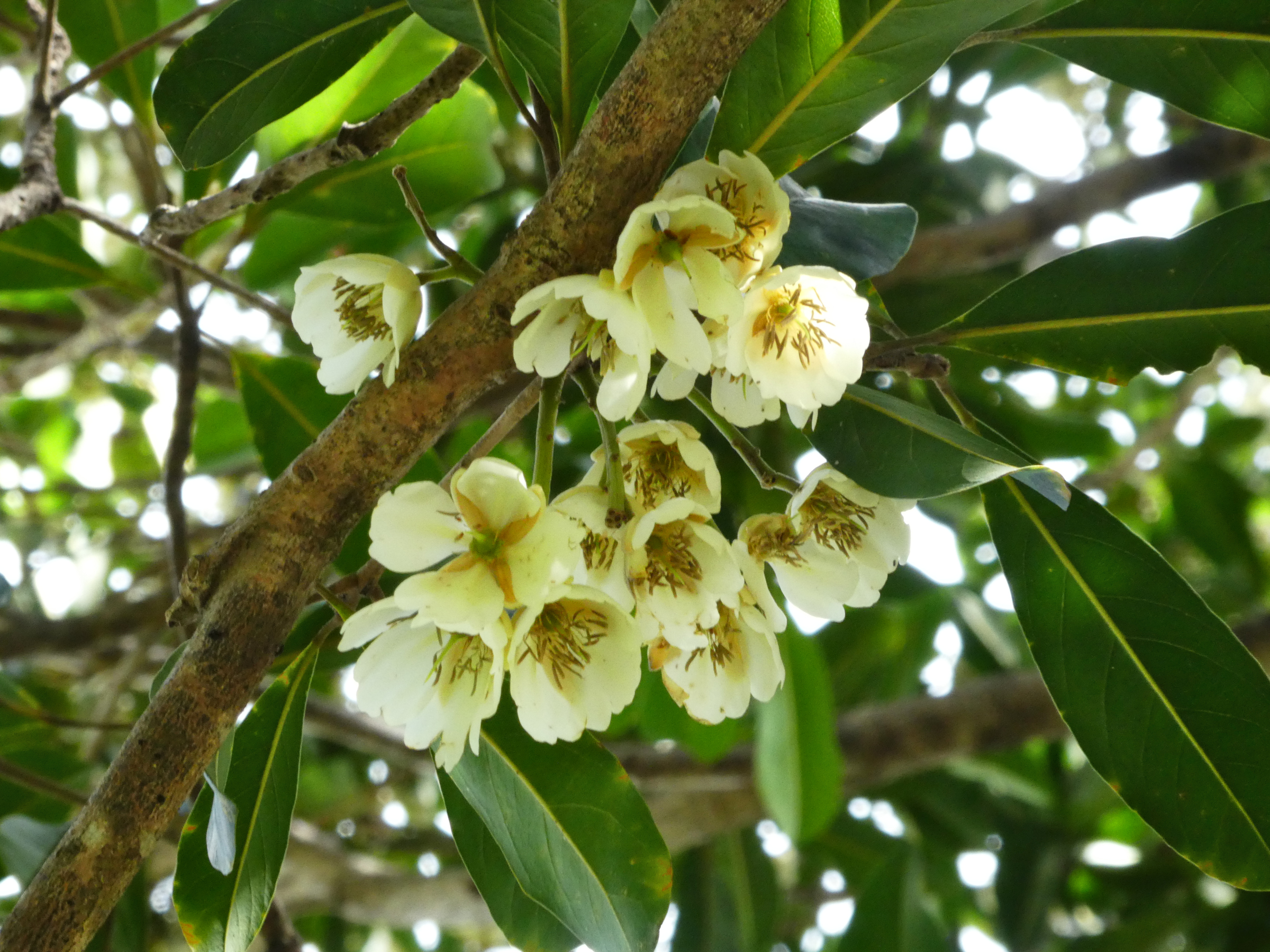
Inflorescence

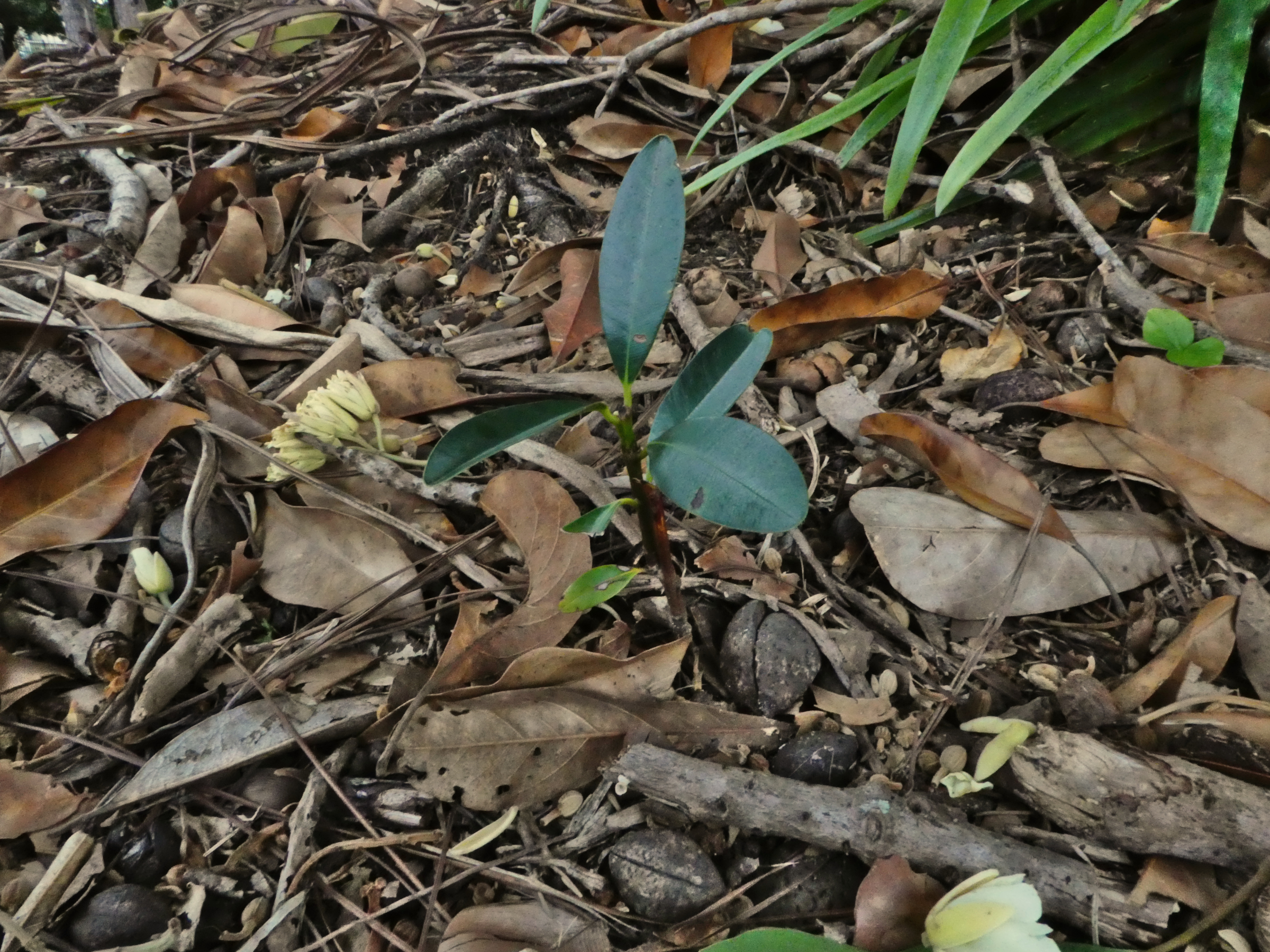
Seedling

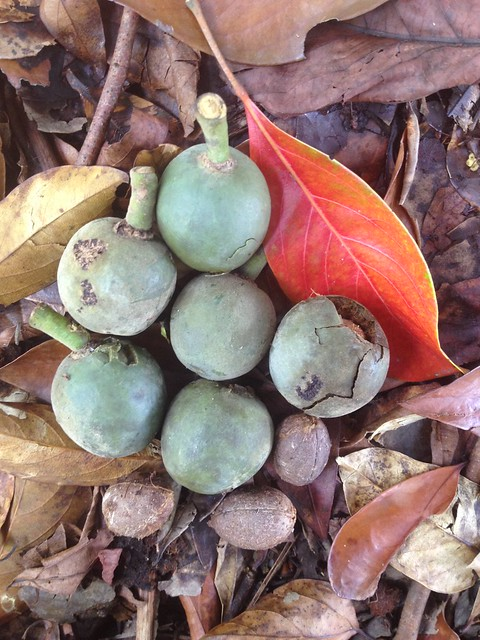
Fruits and stones

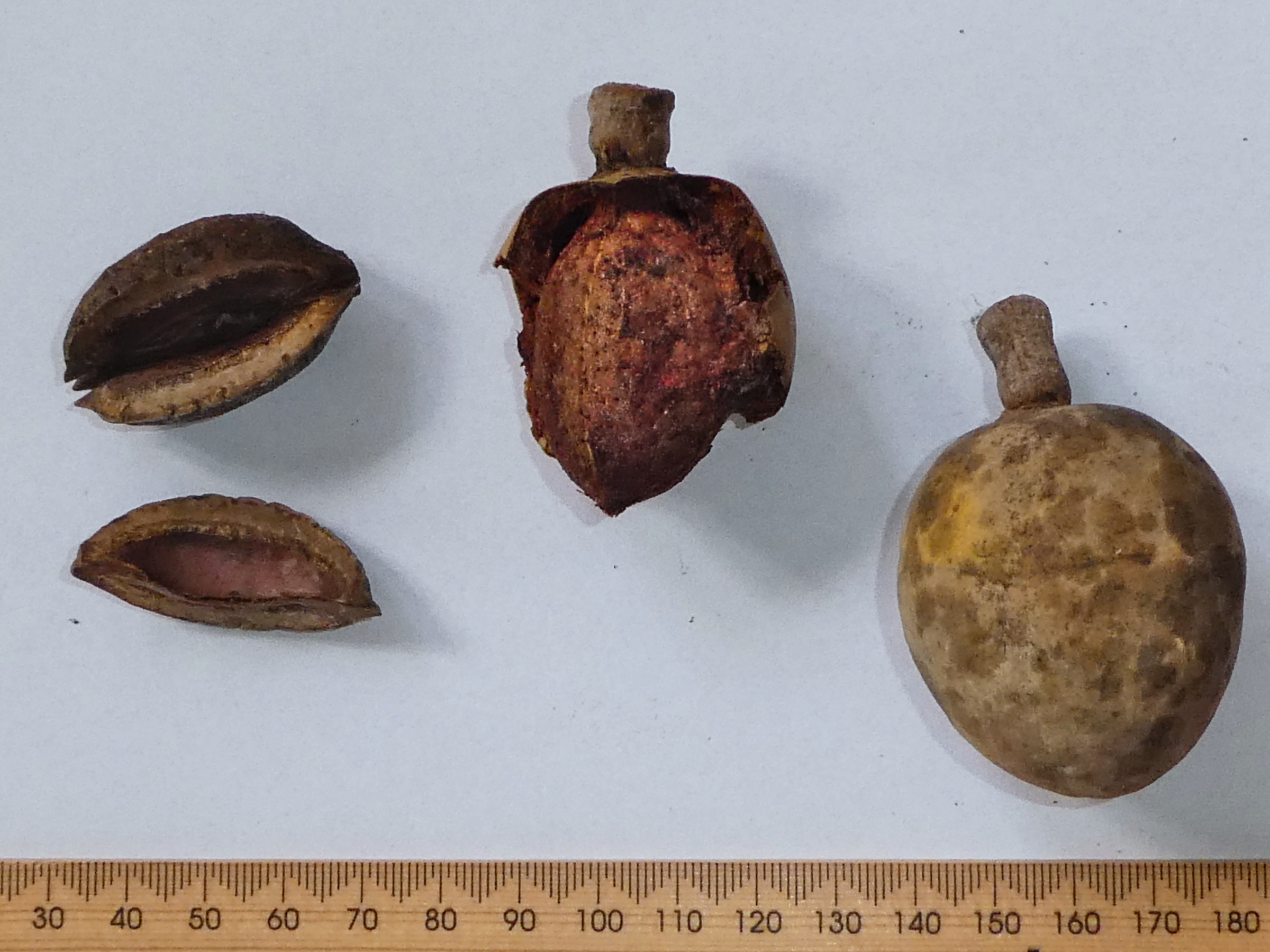
Fruit and stones

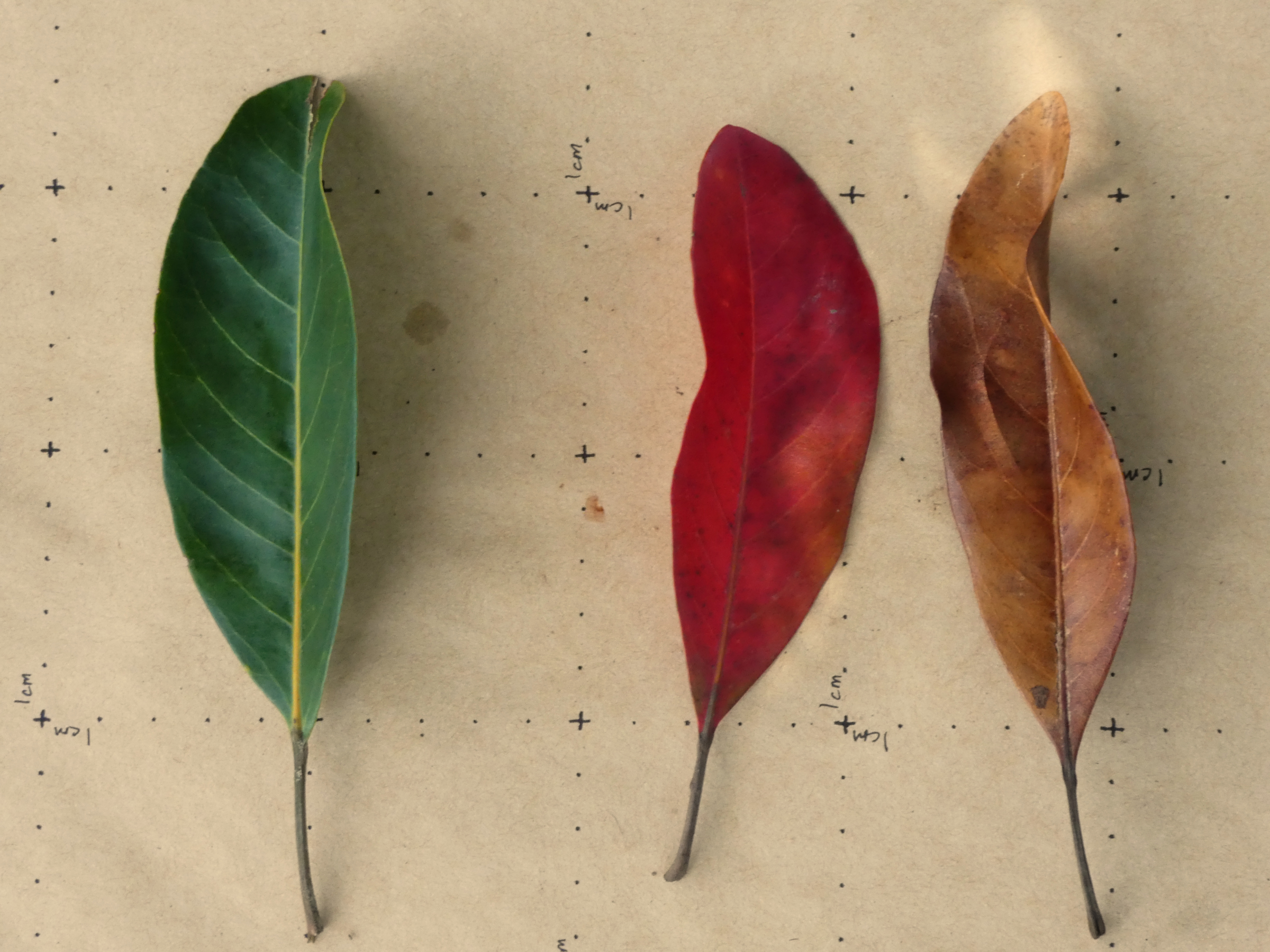
Three leaves: (l to r) fresh, recently fallen, dried

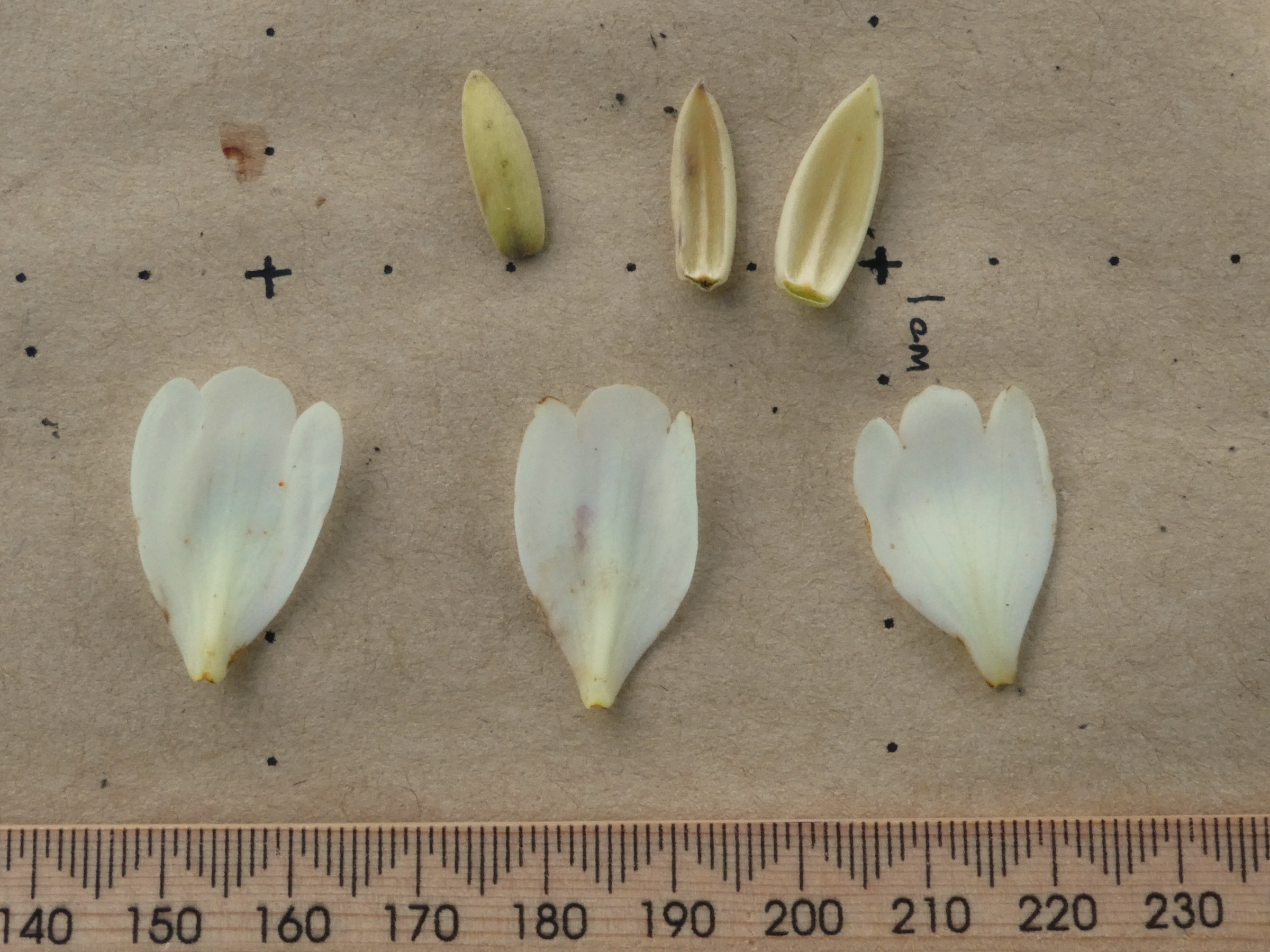
Petals and sepals

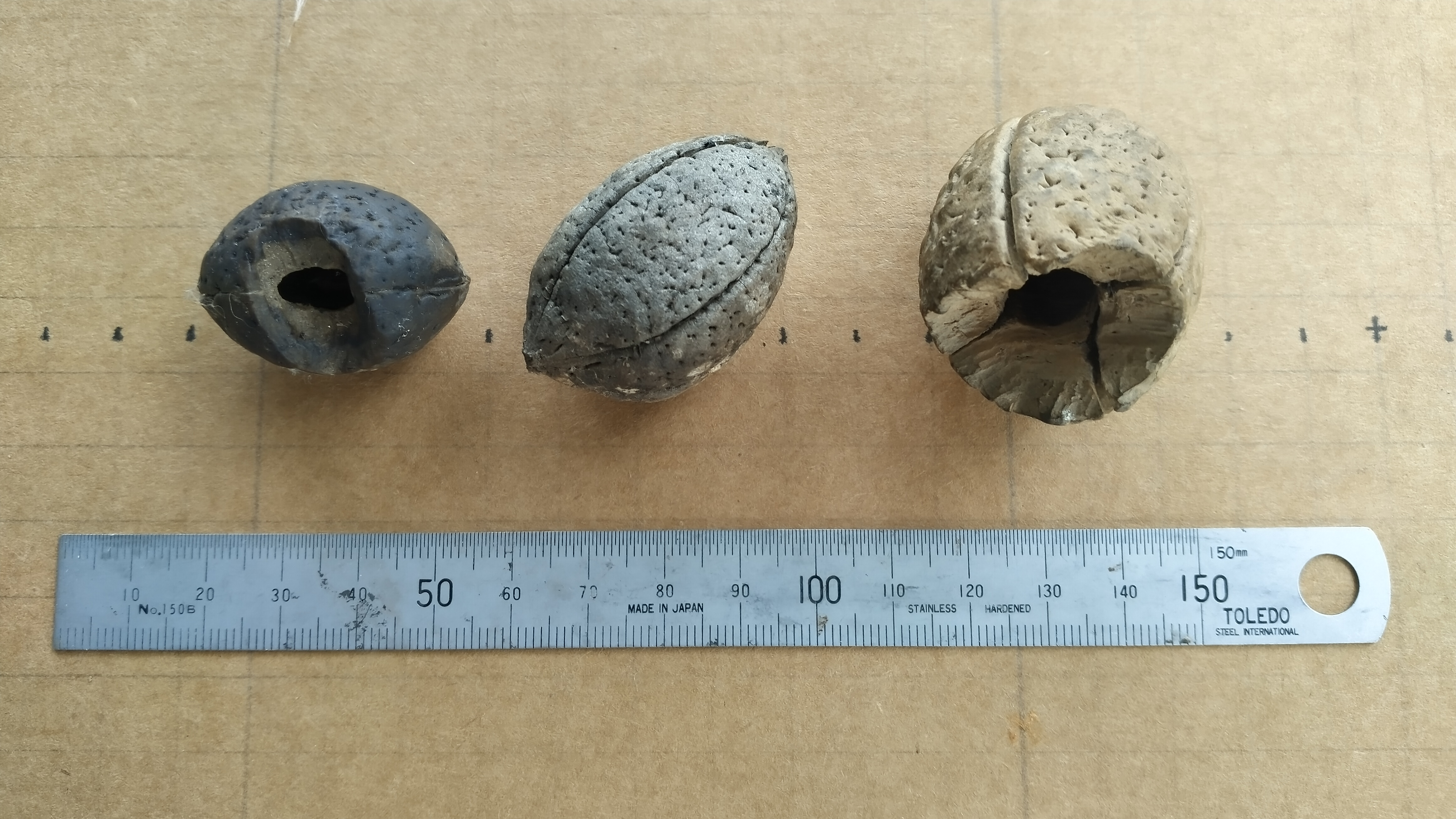
The thickness of the endocarp is apparent after rats have gnawed through it.

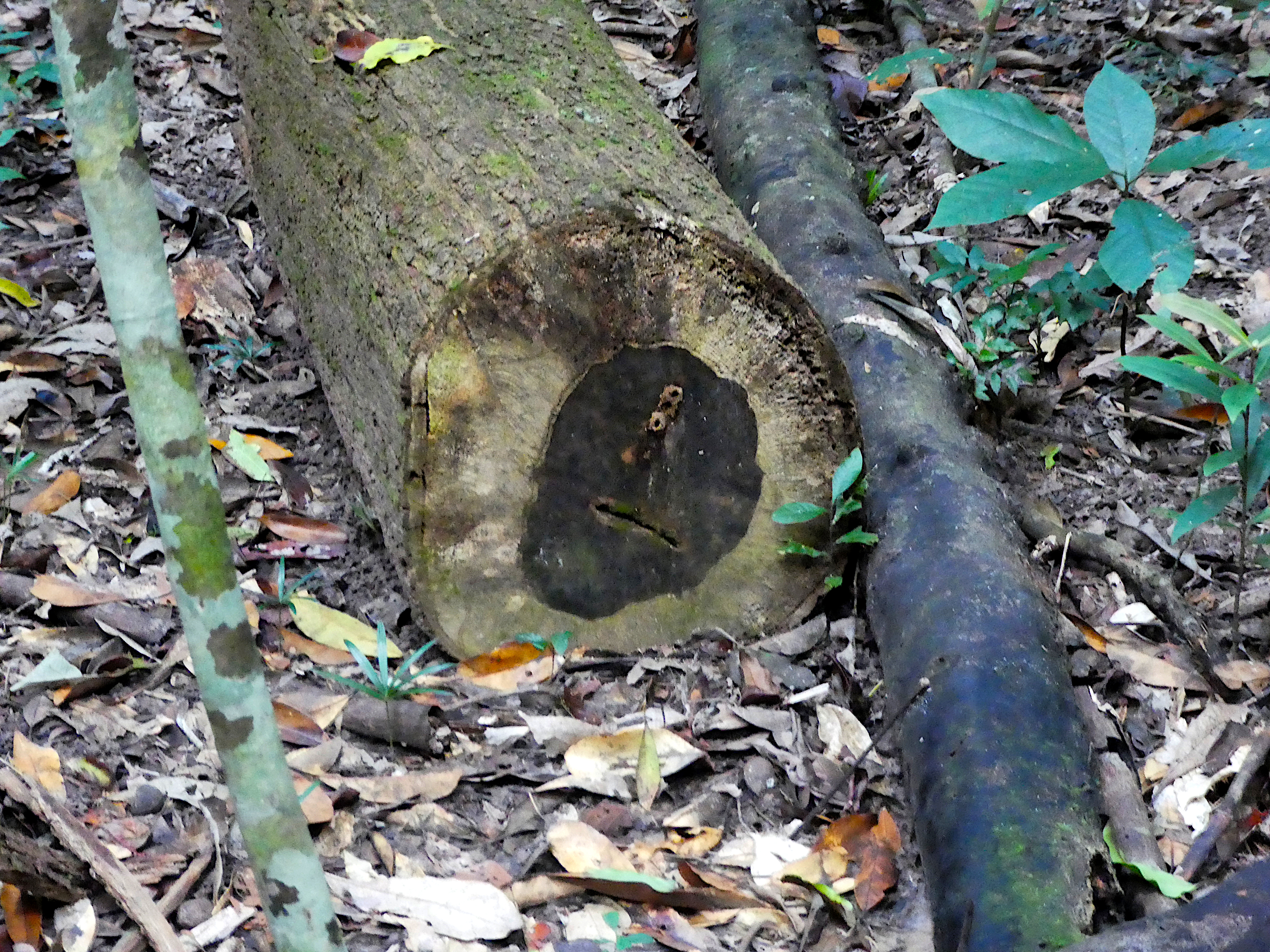
Cut log, showing the very dark heartwood which gives rise to the common name "ebony heart"

== See also ==
- List of Elaeocarpus species
