= Thomas Lane Bancroft =

Australian physician, naturalist and entomologist (1860–1933)

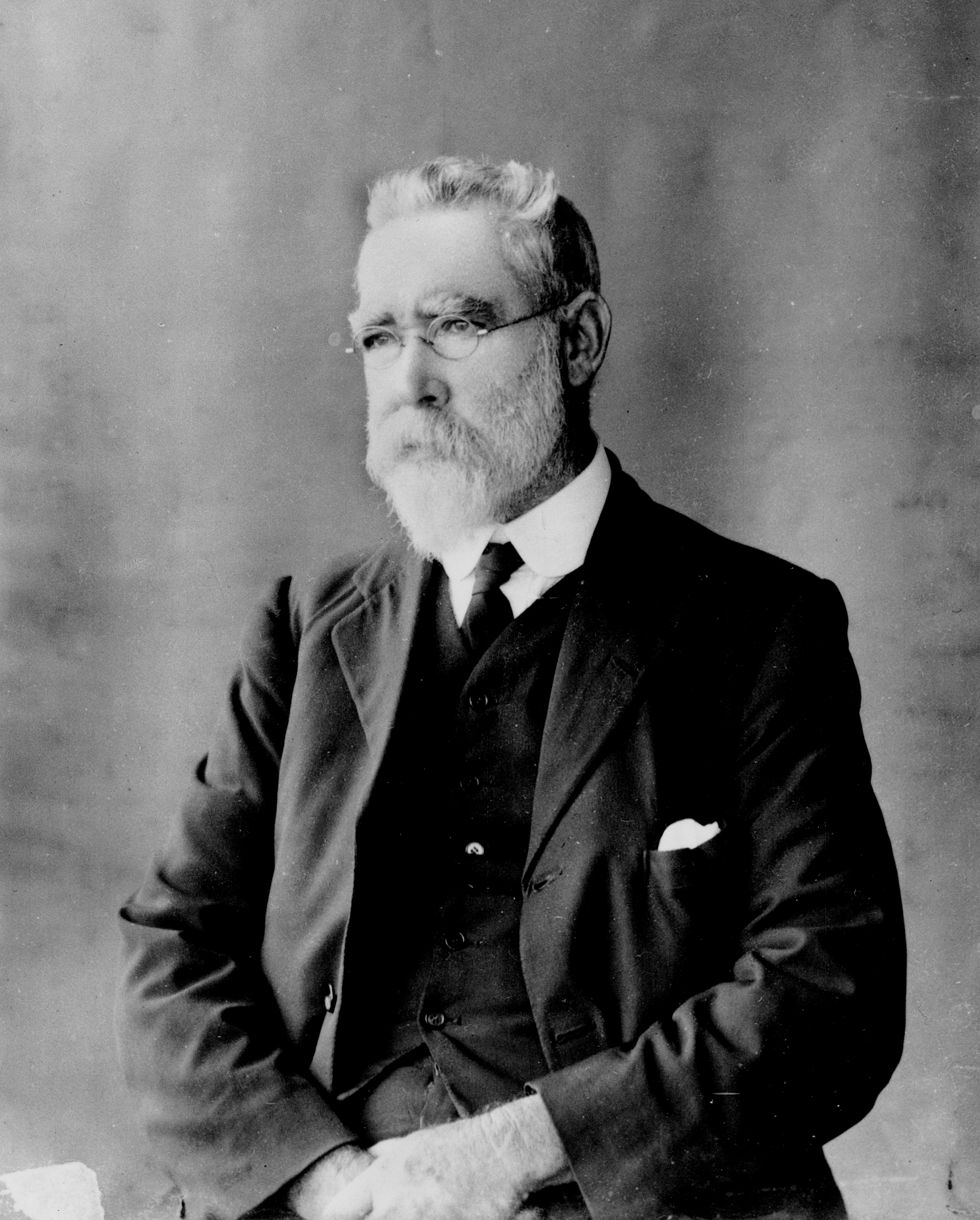
- Born: 2 January 1860; Lenton, Nottinghamshire, England
- Died: 12 November 1933 (aged 73); Wallaville, Queensland, Australia
- Education: University of Edinburgh
- Occupations: Medical naturalist, Physician
- Relatives: Joseph Bancroft (father), Mabel Josephine Bancroft (daughter)
- Medical career
- Field: Parasitology, Entomology, Botany, Agronomy

Thomas Lane Bancroft (2 January 1860 – 12 November 1933) was an Australian medical naturalist. Based in Queensland, he is known for his research on mosquito-borne diseases such as filariasis, the lifecyle of the Australian lungfish, and new crop varieties.

== Early life ==
Thomas Lane Bancroft was born on 2 January 1860 at Lenton, Nottinghamshire, England, the son of Dr Joseph Bancroft and his wife Anne, née Oldfield. When he was four years old when he immigrated to Queensland with his parents, arriving in Brisbane in October 1864. He was educated at the Brisbane Grammar School, and later went to Scotland to study medicine. After taking his degree at the University of Edinburgh, where his father had also studied, he returned to Brisbane. He inherited his father's love of natural science, and like him spent much time, energy, and money in carrying out investigations which were of great use to Queensland. While practising in Brisbane he assisted his father in his work at Deception Bay, where they grew a great variety of crops and bred new kinds of wheat, rice, grapes, and strawberries by cross-breeding different imported varieties.

== Filaria investigations ==
Bancroft also pursued many research interests on his own, but, after his father's death in 1894, continued his father's work on filaria, the parasitic worm that his father had discovered was the cause of filariasis. By breeding the common house mosquito (Culex fatigans) and allowing the insects to bite a person suffering from filaria he showed that the parasite lived and developed in them. The means of transmission of the disease from the mosquito to man was not then known. Bancroft considered that it occurred by the contamination of food, but, on considering that the digestive fluids would probably kill the parasite before it could pass into the blood, he proposed that infection followed on the bite of the mosquito, now proven to be the cause.

After observing that the mosquito concerned with the spread of filaría breeds only around houses, he contended that it could be controlled by the screening or regular emptying of any water in or near the house, measures now advocated and enforced in Queensland. Not being satisfied with the purity of the town water supply, he suggested that the reservoirs be cleaned and deepened, and the area around the reservoirs be fenced off and planted with buffalo grass. His numerous other researches included the testing of snakebite cures, the investigation of mange on horses, and an inquiry into the economics of the distillation of eucalyptus oil from native eucalypts.

== Cotton and Ceratodus ==
Bancroft took up the position of medical officer at Eidsvold, where he acquired a reputation for generosity. There he grew a number of varieties of cotton, including Sea Island types of cotton. He did a great deal of breeding work with this crop, but, unfortunately, the results of this work were lost as he did not actively promote his work as he was a modest man. Another crop in which he was greatly interested was castor oil. He produced a number of varieties of this, but as there was very little demand for the oil, this work was not of much immediate use locally.

Being near the Burnett River, he took a scientific interest in fish, and especially in the curious Australian lungfish, or Ceratodus. He studied its life history, and showed great ingenuity in his arrangements for breeding and observing it under artificial conditions. After noting the diminishing numbers of these "living fossils," he advocated their protection and proposed the establishment of a breeding station at Stradbroke Island. Although the breeding station did not come to fruition, Ceratodus was introduced into the Logan River and other Queensland rivers.

== Palm Island ==
Towards the end of 1930 he obtained an appointment as medical officer at the Palm Island Aboriginal Settlement. He looked forward to being able to end his days, as he thought, in comfort, with a reasonable amount of leisure and some facilities for experimenting with cotton and lungfish. Unfortunately, owing to a delay on the journey, he lost most of the young fish which he was taking with him, and did not have sufficient to carry on the work. When at last he reached the island, he was disappointed. Instead of an island covered with tropical scrub, he found "a huge granitic rock covered with blady grass, with scrub only in the gullies " There was no fishing or shooting, and very few insects and birds. The only cultivation was a reclaimed swamp, which was all needed to grow food for the Aboriginal people. Although the heat and humidity made him sick, and there was no water suitable for irrigation, he attempted to grow his cotton varieties, cuttings of which he had brought from Eidsvold.

The island being covered with blady grass, he considered whether this could be put to any use, and inquired into the possibility of making paper out of it. He firmly believed that it was his duty to improve the living conditions of the Aboriginal people, and was not afraid publicly to criticise the location and management of the settlement. In addition to the unwelcome publicity which he gaveto the island. Bancroft continually endeavoured to make full use of all the available land for growing food, and strenuously opposed the policy of growing Mauritius beans for sale to the farmers on the mainland while the Aboriginal people were almost starving.

== Later life ==
In May 1932, he left Palm Island for Wallaville near Bundaberg to semi-retire, looking forward to the freedom and leisure of a small medical private practice and furthering his research work.

Shortly before his death in 1933, he was described as follows:

"Bancroft is a living example of the old saying that a prophet is without honour in his own country, this often applies also to scientists, and to any man who is rather different from and greatly superior to his fellows. His attitude towards nature was that of the true scientist, who believes that nothing is too great or too small to investigate, in spite of this, his work was largely of practical value. The protection of aboriginals against the maladministiatlon of the settlement and his generosity to all are sufficient indications of the doctor's character. His work and personality are still remembered with pleasure by those who knew him in Brisbane, and Queenslanders must not forget him and his father, who were pioneers of scientific work in this State."

== Personal life ==
On 10 July 1895 Bancroft married Cecilia Mary Jones (1868–1961), the daughter of Anglican Archdeacon Thomas Jones of Brisbane. Their daughter Mabel Josephine (Jo) Bancroft (1896–1971) became a noted parasitologist, researching cattle ticks, sheep blowfly and malaria.

Bancroft died on Sunday 12 November 1933 at his home at Wallaville aged 73 years old. On Tuesday 14 November 1933 his funeral was held at John Hislop and Son's funeral chapel in South Brisbane and he was buried at Toowong Cemetery. The funeral was conducted by Reverend Roy St George of St Andrew's Anglican Church at Indooroopilly.

== Legacy ==
Bancroft was an avid collector of botanic specimens for the purpose of having them formally described. As a result a number of taxa bear his name, including Elaeocarpus bancroftii, Viscum bancroftii, Beilschmiedia bancroftii, and Stephania bancroftii.

There is a monument to Thomas Bancroft and his father Joseph Bancroft in Bancroft Park, Captain Cook Parade, Deception Bay (27.1791°S 153.0290°E). It was unveiled on Sunday 21 July 1963 by the Queensland branch of the Australian Medical Association, the Caboolture Shire Council, and the Caboolture Historical Society.
