= Joseph Bancroft =

British-Australian surgeon, pharmacologist and parasitologist

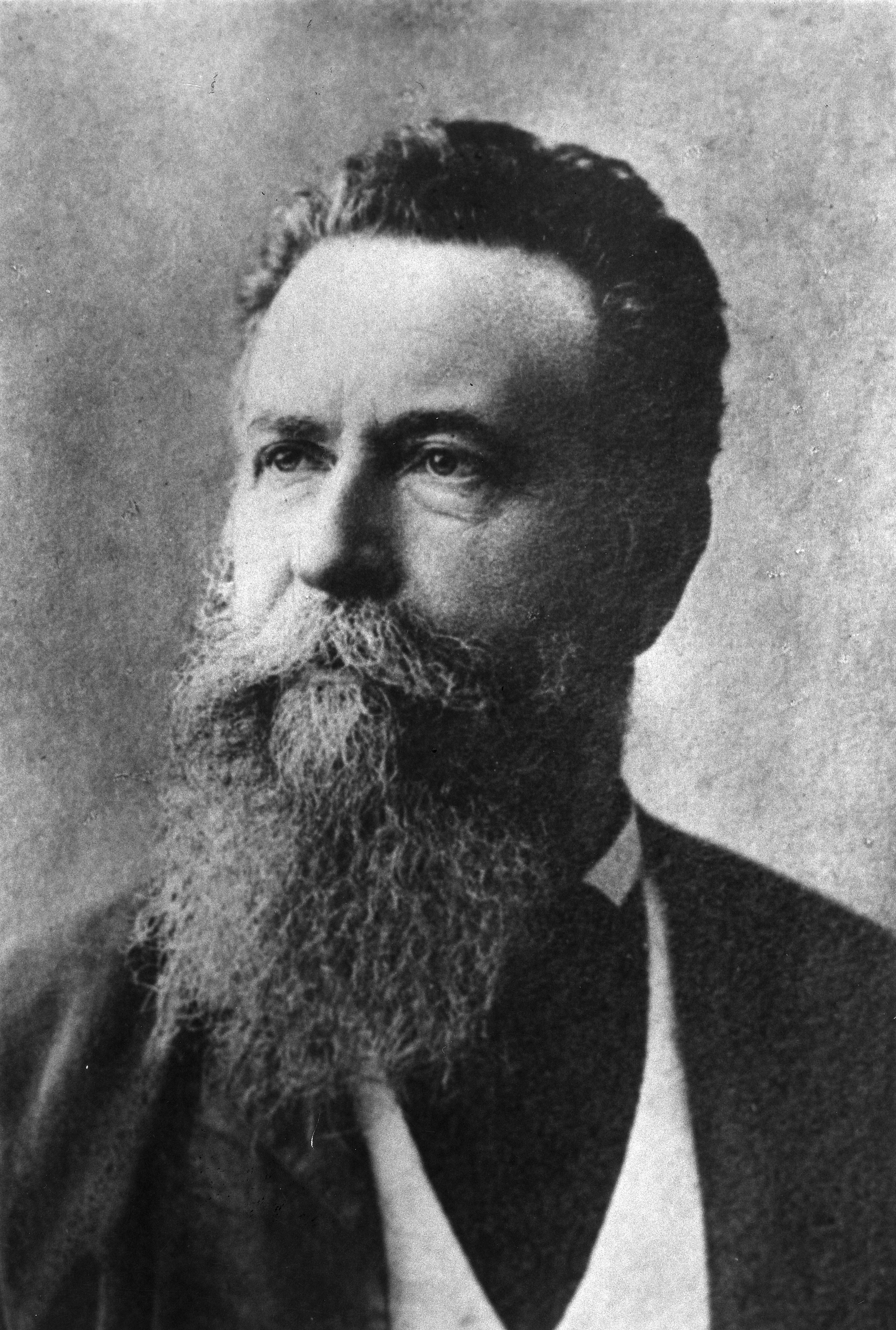
Dr Joseph Bancroft

Joseph Bancroft (21 February 1836 – 16 June 1894) was a surgeon, pharmacologist and parasitologist born in England, who emigrated to Queensland, Australia.

== Early life ==
Bancroft was born in Stretford, near Manchester, Lancashire, the only son of Joseph Bancroft, a farmer, and his wife Mary, née Lane. He took a five-year apprenticeship with Dr Jeremiah Renshaw at Sale in Cheshire. He later studied at the Manchester Royal School of Medicine and Surgery (M.R.C.S., L.S.A., 1859), where he won several prizes. He took his medical degree at the University of St Andrews in 1859 and later became a member of the Royal College of Surgeons. He practised at Nottingham until 1864, then emigrated to Queensland after being advised a warmer climate would improve his health.

== Legacy ==
The main building of the Queensland Institute of Medical Research is named the Bancroft Centre in honour of Bancroft's role as the key figure in establishing medical research in Queensland.

The electoral district of Bancroft created in the 2017 Queensland state electoral redistribution was named after him.

There is a monument to Joseph Bancroft and his son Thomas Lane Bancroft in Bancroft Park, Captain Cook Parade, Deception Bay (27.1791°S 153.0290°E). It was unveiled on Sunday 21 July 1963 by the Queensland branch of the Australian Medical Association, the Caboolture Shire Council, and the Caboolture Historical Society.

Several streets have been named after Bancroft including Bancroft Terrace and Joseph Crescent in Deception Bay, and Bancroft Street in Kelvin Grove.

The papers of Dr Joseph Bancroft and his son are held by the State Library of Queensland.
