= Electoral results for the Division of Petrie =

Australian election results

This is a list of electoral results for the Division of Petrie in Australian federal elections from the division's creation in 1949 until the present.

== Members ==
Member	Party	Term
Alan Hulme	Liberal	1949–1961
Reginald O'Brien	Labor	1961–1963
(Sir) Alan Hulme	Liberal	1963–1972
Marshall Cooke	Liberal	1972–1974
John Hodges	Liberal	1974–1983
Dean Wells	Labor	1983–1984
John Hodges	Liberal	1984–1987
Gary Johns	Labor	1987–1996
Teresa Gambaro	Liberal	1996–2007
Yvette D'Ath	Labor	2007–2013
Luke Howarth	Liberal National	2013–2025
Emma Comer	Labor	2025–present

== Election results ==
=== Elections in the 2020s ===
==== 2025 ====
2025 Australian federal election: Petrie
Party	Candidate	Votes	%	±%
Labor	Emma Comer	11,604	37.16	+6.34
Liberal National	Luke Howarth	10,104	32.36	−6.53
Greens	Nikil Paul	4,712	15.09	+1.49
One Nation	Nicole Shires	2,159	6.91	+0.96
Trumpet of Patriots	Ryan Mensink	1,433	4.59	+4.59
Family First	Sharan Hall	1,216	3.89	+3.89
Total formal votes		31,228	96.25	+0.28
Informal votes		1,217	3.75	−0.28
Turnout		32,445	24.14	

Results are not final. Last updated on 3 May 2025 at 8:15 PM AEST.

==== 2022 ====
2022 Australian federal election: Petrie
Party	Candidate	Votes	%	±%
Liberal National	Luke Howarth	46,325	43.49	−4.62
Labor	Mick Denton	31,972	30.02	−0.84
Greens	Will Simon	12,169	11.42	+2.68
United Australia	Kelly Guenoun	5,914	5.55	+2.24
One Nation	Marcus Mitchell	5,613	5.27	−2.25
Animal Justice	Chris Cicchitti	2,331	2.19	+2.19
Liberal Democrats	Anneke Wilson	2,189	2.06	+2.06
Total formal votes		106,513	96.46	+0.08
Informal votes		3,913	3.54	−0.08
Turnout		110,426	88.46	−2.84
Two-party-preferred result
Liberal National	Luke Howarth	57,981	54.44	−3.96
Labor	Mick Denton	48,532	45.56	+3.96
Liberal National hold		Swing	−3.96	

Alluvial diagram for preference flows in the seat of Petrie in the 2022 federal election. indicates at what stage the winning candidate had over 50% of the votes and was declared the winner.

=== Elections in the 2010s ===
==== 2019 ====
2019 Australian federal election: Petrie
Party	Candidate	Votes	%	±%
Liberal National	Luke Howarth	48,879	48.11	+3.41
Labor	Corinne Mulholland	31,348	30.86	−7.52
Greens	Jason Kennedy	8,877	8.74	+1.37
One Nation	Nikhil Aai Reddy	7,638	7.52	+7.52
United Australia	Troy Hopkins	3,361	3.31	+3.31
Conservative National	Neville Fowler	1,494	1.47	+1.47
Total formal votes		101,597	96.38	+0.40
Informal votes		3,813	3.62	−0.40
Turnout		105,410	91.30	−0.32
Two-party-preferred result
Liberal National	Luke Howarth	59,331	58.40	+6.75
Labor	Corinne Mulholland	42,266	41.60	−6.75
Liberal National hold		Swing	+6.75	

==== 2016 ====
2016 Australian federal election: Petrie
Party	Candidate	Votes	%	±%
Liberal National	Luke Howarth	41,475	44.70	+4.05
Labor	Jacqui Pedersen	35,616	38.38	−1.14
Greens	Sue Weber	6,840	7.37	+2.85
Family First	Mark White	4,746	5.11	+2.96
Liberal Democrats	Catherine Buckley	2,877	3.10	+3.10
Arts	Andrew Tyrrell	1,239	1.34	+1.34
Total formal votes		92,793	95.98	+1.18
Informal votes		3,886	4.02	−1.18
Turnout		96,679	91.73	−1.96
Two-party-preferred result
Liberal National	Luke Howarth	47,926	51.65	+1.12
Labor	Jacqui Pedersen	44,867	48.35	−1.12
Liberal National hold		Swing	+1.12	

==== 2013 ====
2013 Australian federal election: Petrie
Party	Candidate	Votes	%	±%
Liberal National	Luke Howarth	33,570	40.65	+0.59
Labor	Yvette D'Ath	32,630	39.52	−3.27
Palmer United	Thor Prohaska	8,422	10.20	+10.20
Greens	John Marshall	3,729	4.52	−4.58
Family First	Tasman Spence	1,774	2.15	−2.86
Katter's Australian	Chris Thomson	1,336	1.62	+1.62
Rise Up Australia	Elise Jennings	920	1.11	+1.11
Citizens Electoral Council	Geoff Cornell	192	0.23	+0.23
Total formal votes		82,573	94.80	+0.08
Informal votes		4,530	5.20	−0.08
Turnout		87,103	93.69	+0.65
Two-party-preferred result
Liberal National	Luke Howarth	41,722	50.53	+3.04
Labor	Yvette D'Ath	40,851	49.47	−3.04
Liberal National gain from Labor		Swing	+3.04	

==== 2010 ====
2010 Australian federal election: Petrie
Party	Candidate	Votes	%	±%
Labor	Yvette D'Ath	32,677	42.79	−6.27
Liberal National	Dean Teasdale	30,590	40.06	−2.76
Greens	Peter Jeremijenko	6,949	9.10	+4.68
Family First	Sally Vincent	3,829	5.01	+3.14
Liberal Democrats	Gabriel Buckley	1,604	2.10	+1.79
Democratic Labor	Lawrence Addison	715	0.94	+0.94
Total formal votes		76,364	94.72	−2.06
Informal votes		4,253	5.28	+2.06
Turnout		80,617	93.00	−1.10
Two-party-preferred result
Labor	Yvette D'Ath	40,097	52.51	−1.70
Liberal National	Dean Teasdale	36,267	47.49	+1.70
Labor hold		Swing	−1.70	

=== Elections in the 2000s ===
==== 2007 ====
2007 Australian federal election: Petrie
Party	Candidate	Votes	%	±%
Labor	Yvette D'Ath	38,988	46.89	+9.39
Liberal	Teresa Gambaro	37,299	44.86	−7.41
Greens	Terry Jones	3,890	4.68	−0.02
Family First	Sally Vincent	1,516	1.82	−1.88
Democrats	Bruce Carnwell	814	0.98	−0.76
Christian Democrats	Peter Britt	430	0.52	+0.52
Liberty & Democracy	Michael Pope	217	0.26	+0.26
Total formal votes		83,154	97.03	+1.04
Informal votes		2,546	2.97	−1.04
Turnout		85,700	95.12	−0.38
Two-party-preferred result
Labor	Yvette D'Ath	43,283	52.05	+9.50
Liberal	Teresa Gambaro	39,871	47.95	−9.50
Labor gain from Liberal		Swing	+9.50	

==== 2004 ====
2004 Australian federal election: Petrie
Party	Candidate	Votes	%	±%
Liberal	Teresa Gambaro	41,987	52.73	+4.47
Labor	Gavin Brady	29,589	37.16	−0.80
Greens	Rick Pass	3,676	4.62	+1.93
Family First	Wade Whincop	2,972	3.73	+3.73
Democrats	Terri Ball	1,403	1.76	−3.44
Total formal votes		79,627	95.98	+0.26
Informal votes		3,338	4.02	−0.26
Turnout		82,965	94.69	−0.43
Two-party-preferred result
Liberal	Teresa Gambaro	46,119	57.92	+4.44
Labor	Gavin Brady	33,508	42.08	−4.44
Liberal hold		Swing	+4.44	

==== 2001 ====
2001 Australian federal election: Petrie
Party	Candidate	Votes	%	±%
Liberal	Teresa Gambaro	39,411	48.19	+5.82
Labor	Rosemary Hume	31,044	37.96	−1.70
Democrats	Owen Griffiths	4,284	5.24	+0.15
One Nation	Bill Black	3,463	4.23	−6.86
Greens	Kim Pantano	2,254	2.76	+0.96
Independent	Ron Eaton	1,319	1.61	+1.61
Total formal votes		81,775	95.74	−1.67
Informal votes		3,640	4.26	+1.67
Turnout		85,415	95.62	
Two-party-preferred result
Liberal	Teresa Gambaro	43,682	53.42	+2.67
Labor	Rosemary Hume	38,093	46.58	−2.67
Liberal hold		Swing	+2.67	

=== Elections in the 1990s ===
==== 1998 ====
1998 Australian federal election: Petrie
Party	Candidate	Votes	%	±%
Liberal	Teresa Gambaro	32,994	42.37	−9.19
Labor	Rosemary Hume	30,882	39.66	+3.60
One Nation	Raymond Bower	8,637	11.09	+11.09
Democrats	Pamela Stowell	3,962	5.09	−1.42
Greens	Peter Burgoyne	1,395	1.79	−0.80
Total formal votes		77,870	97.41	−0.17
Informal votes		2,072	2.59	+0.17
Turnout		79,942	94.68	−0.36
Two-party-preferred result
Liberal	Teresa Gambaro	39,522	50.75	−7.52
Labor	Rosemary Hume	38,348	49.25	+7.52
Liberal hold		Swing	−7.52	

==== 1996 ====
1996 Australian federal election: Petrie
Party	Candidate	Votes	%	±%
Liberal	Teresa Gambaro	38,415	51.23	+11.51
Labor	Gary Johns	27,280	36.38	−8.24
Democrats	Zillah Jackson	4,918	6.56	+2.23
Greens	Dell Jones	1,995	2.66	+0.19
Independent	Nat Karmichael	1,148	1.53	+1.53
Independent	Leonard Matthews	382	0.51	+0.51
Independent	John Phillips	337	0.45	+0.45
Independent	Kerry Hay	275	0.37	+0.37
Indigenous Peoples	Keryn Jackson	236	0.31	+0.31
Total formal votes		74,986	97.51	+0.06
Informal votes		1,916	2.49	−0.06
Turnout		76,902	95.04	−0.90
Two-party-preferred result
Liberal	Teresa Gambaro	43,172	57.70	+9.85
Labor	Gary Johns	31,651	42.30	−9.85
Liberal gain from Labor		Swing	+9.85	

==== 1993 ====
1993 Australian federal election: Petrie
Party	Candidate	Votes	%	±%
Labor	Gary Johns	32,436	44.14	−0.73
Liberal	Alan Sherlock	29,487	40.12	+1.21
Independent	Jeff Gehrmann	3,182	4.33	+4.33
Democrats	Zillah Jackson	3,167	4.31	−6.89
National	Brendan Power	2,126	2.89	−1.02
Greens	Angela Jones	1,854	2.52	+2.52
Confederate Action	Allan Mutch	1,025	1.39	+1.39
Natural Law	Gina Neville	215	0.29	+0.29
Total formal votes		73,492	97.51	−0.63
Informal votes		1,887	2.49	+0.63
Turnout		75,369	95.93	
Two-party-preferred result
Labor	Gary Johns	38,256	52.10	−0.84
Liberal	Alan Sherlock	35,176	47.90	+0.84
Labor hold		Swing	−0.84	

==== 1990 ====
1990 Australian federal election: Petrie
Party	Candidate	Votes	%	±%
Labor	Gary Johns	30,763	44.2	−2.0
Liberal	Bruce Flegg	27,992	40.2	+7.2
Democrats	Anthony Bloomer	7,740	11.1	+4.4
National	Peter Bateman	2,327	3.3	−10.9
Democratic Socialist	Natasha Simons	792	1.1	+1.1
Total formal votes		69,614	98.1	
Informal votes		1,335	1.9	
Turnout		70,949	95.2	
Two-party-preferred result
Labor	Gary Johns	36,327	52.3	+0.9
Liberal	Bruce Flegg	33,185	47.7	−0.9
Labor hold		Swing	+0.9	

=== Elections in the 1980s ===
==== 1987 ====
1987 Australian federal election: Petrie
Party	Candidate	Votes	%	±%
Labor	Gary Johns	30,537	46.2	+0.0
Liberal	John Hodges	21,780	33.0	−0.2
National	Gerard Cross	9,375	14.2	−1.6
Democrats	Isobel Robinson	4,404	6.7	+1.9
Total formal votes		66,096	97.0	
Informal votes		2,013	3.0	
Turnout		68,109	93.5	
Two-party-preferred result
Labor	Gary Johns	33,995	51.4	+2.0
Liberal	John Hodges	32,086	48.6	−2.0
Labor gain from Liberal		Swing	+2.0	

==== 1984 ====
1984 Australian federal election: Petrie
Party	Candidate	Votes	%	±%
Labor	Deane Wells	28,392	46.2	−1.8
Liberal	John Hodges	20,395	33.2	−9.9
National	Don Munro	9,701	15.8	+15.8
Democrats	Garry Somerville	2,971	4.8	−1.6
Total formal votes		61,459	95.5	
Informal votes		2,879	4.5	
Turnout		64,338	94.1	
Two-party-preferred result
Liberal	John Hodges	31,115	50.6	+2.1
Labor	Deane Wells	30,339	49.4	−2.1
Liberal gain from Labor		Swing	+2.1	

==== 1983 ====
1983 Australian federal election: Petrie
Party	Candidate	Votes	%	±%
Labor	Deane Wells	33,283	47.0	+4.3
Liberal	John Hodges	31,227	44.1	−3.9
Democrats	Ray Hollis	4,506	6.4	−0.4
Independent	Christopher Caldwell	1,453	2.0	+2.0
Progress	Phillip Grimison	411	0.6	−2.0
Total formal votes		70,880	98.6	
Informal votes		1,003	1.4	
Turnout		71,883	93.4	
Two-party-preferred result
Labor	Deane Wells	35,800	50.5	+3.9
Liberal	John Hodges	35,080	49.5	−3.9
Labor gain from Liberal		Swing	+3.9	

==== 1980 ====
1980 Australian federal election: Petrie
Party	Candidate	Votes	%	±%
Liberal	John Hodges	32,979	48.0	−4.8
Labor	Deane Wells	29,319	42.7	+8.7
Democrats	Pauline Moylan	4,668	6.8	−5.1
Progress	Phillip Grimson	1,768	2.6	+1.3
Total formal votes		68,734	98.4	
Informal votes		1,091	1.6	
Turnout		69,825	94.9	
Two-party-preferred result
Liberal	John Hodges	36,671	53.4	−6.5
Labor	Deane Wells	32,063	46.6	+6.5
Liberal hold		Swing	−6.5	

=== Elections in the 1970s ===
==== 1977 ====
1977 Australian federal election: Petrie
Party	Candidate	Votes	%	±%
Liberal	John Hodges	33,853	52.8	−9.7
Labor	Gerard Molloy	21,774	34.0	−3.5
Democrats	Leslie Mundt	7,648	11.9	+11.9
Progress	Rodney Jeanneret	823	1.3	+1.3
Total formal votes		64,098	98.7	
Informal votes		819	1.3	
Turnout		64,917	96.0	
Two-party-preferred result
Liberal	John Hodges		59.9	−2.6
Labor	Gerard Molloy		40.1	+2.6
Liberal hold		Swing	−2.6	

==== 1975 ====
1975 Australian federal election: Petrie
Party	Candidate	Votes	%	±%
Liberal	John Hodges	47,414	62.5	+21.2
Labor	John Hungerford	28,452	37.5	−5.5
Total formal votes		75,866	98.6	
Informal votes		1,049	1.4	
Turnout		76,915	95.6	
Liberal hold		Swing	+7.5	

==== 1974 ====
1974 Australian federal election: Petrie
Party	Candidate	Votes	%	±%
Labor	Denis Murphy	30,651	43.0	−2.2
Liberal	John Hodges	29,442	41.3	+5.5
Country	Peter Addison	10,009	14.0	+3.8
Australia	Jill Ritchie	1,202	1.7	−1.8
Total formal votes		71,304	98.5	
Informal votes		1,063	1.5	
Turnout		72,367	95.5	
Two-party-preferred result
Liberal	John Hodges	39,183	55.0	+3.7
Labor	Denis Murphy	32,121	45.0	−3.7
Liberal hold		Swing	+3.7	

==== 1972 ====
1972 Australian federal election: Petrie
Party	Candidate	Votes	%	±%
Labor	Denis Murphy	27,942	45.2	+0.9
Liberal	Marshall Cooke	22,092	35.8	−11.2
Country	Gordon Olive	6,332	10.2	+10.2
Democratic Labor	Frank Andrews	3,285	5.3	−0.5
Australia	Alex Dewar	2,137	3.5	+0.7
Total formal votes		61,788	98.1	
Informal votes		1,215	1.9	
Turnout		63,003	95.7	
Two-party-preferred result
Liberal	Marshall Cooke	31,709	51.3	−2.6
Labor	Denis Murphy	30,079	48.7	+2.6
Liberal hold		Swing	−2.6	

=== Elections in the 1960s ===
==== 1969 ====
1969 Australian federal election: Petrie
Party	Candidate	Votes	%	±%
Liberal	Alan Hulme	25,656	47.0	−4.3
Labor	Kenneth Turbet	24,160	44.3	+4.7
Democratic Labor	Robert Macklin	3,168	5.8	−2.8
Australia	Sydney Appleby	1,550	2.8	+2.8
Total formal votes		54,534	98.9	
Informal votes		595	1.1	
Turnout		55,129	95.4	
Two-party-preferred result
Liberal	Alan Hulme	29,383	53.9	−5.9
Labor	Kenneth Turbet	25,151	46.1	+5.9
Liberal hold		Swing	−5.9	

==== 1966 ====
1966 Australian federal election: Petrie
Party	Candidate	Votes	%	±%
Liberal	Alan Hulme	34,715	51.9	+4.8
Labor	Reginald O'Brien	26,073	39.0	−6.7
Democratic Labor	Thomas Grundy	5,740	8.6	+1.7
Independent	Francis O'Mara	299	0.4	+0.1
Total formal votes		66,827	98.4	
Informal votes		1,081	1.6	
Turnout		67,908	95.5	
Two-party-preferred result
Liberal	Alan Hulme		59.2	+5.7
Labor	Reginald O'Brien		40.8	−5.7
Liberal hold		Swing	+5.7	

==== 1963 ====
1963 Australian federal election: Petrie
Party	Candidate	Votes	%	±%
Liberal	Alan Hulme	27,616	47.1	+5.2
Labor	Reginald O'Brien	26,804	45.7	−3.5
Democratic Labor	Brian Balaam	4,035	6.9	+1.0
Independent	Francis O'Mara	159	0.3	−0.2
Total formal votes		58,614	97.7	
Informal votes		1,394	2.3	
Turnout		60,008	96.0	
Two-party-preferred result
Liberal	Alan Hulme	31,335	53.5	+4.2
Labor	Reginald O'Brien	27,279	46.5	−4.2
Liberal gain from Labor		Swing	+4.2	

==== 1961 ====
1961 Australian federal election: Petrie
Party	Candidate	Votes	%	±%
Labor	Reginald O'Brien	26,468	49.2	+14.3
Liberal	Alan Hulme	22,516	41.9	−8.6
Queensland Labor	Trevol Sturling	3,179	5.9	−4.9
Independent	Cecil Guilfoyle	1,314	2.4	+2.4
Independent	Francis O'Mara	266	0.5	+0.5
Total formal votes		53,743	97.1	
Informal votes		1,611	2.9	
Turnout		55,354	95.5	
Two-party-preferred result
Labor	Reginald O'Brien	27,269	50.7	+11.2
Liberal	Alan Hulme	26,474	49.3	−11.2
Labor gain from Liberal		Swing	+11.2	

=== Elections in the 1950s ===
==== 1958 ====
1958 Australian federal election: Petrie
Party	Candidate	Votes	%	±%
Liberal	Alan Hulme	23,682	50.5	−6.3
Labor	John Claffey	16,376	34.9	−8.3
Queensland Labor	Maxwell McCurdie	5,081	10.8	+10.8
Australian Nationalist	Horace Burge	1,776	3.8	+3.8
Total formal votes		46,915	96.1	
Informal votes		1,910	3.9	
Turnout		48,825	96.3	
Two-party-preferred result
Liberal	Alan Hulme		60.5	+3.7
Labor	John Claffey		39.5	−3.7
Liberal hold		Swing	+3.7	

==== 1955 ====
1955 Australian federal election: Petrie
Party	Candidate	Votes	%	±%
Liberal	Alan Hulme	23,328	56.8	+1.7
Labor	Noel Curran	17,740	43.2	−1.7
Total formal votes		41,068	97.6	
Informal votes		993	2.4	
Turnout		42,061	95.5	
Liberal hold		Swing	+1.7	

==== 1954 ====
1954 Australian federal election: Petrie
Party	Candidate	Votes	%	±%
Liberal	Alan Hulme	26,706	55.1	−3.5
Labor	Alexander Barry	21,774	44.9	+3.5
Total formal votes		48,480	98.9	
Informal votes		561	1.1	
Turnout		49,041	96.8	
Liberal hold		Swing	−3.5	

==== 1951 ====
1951 Australian federal election: Petrie
Party	Candidate	Votes	%	±%
Liberal	Alan Hulme	24,843	58.6	−1.1
Labor	Patrick Bredhauer	17,533	41.4	+4.8
Total formal votes		42,376	98.0	
Informal votes		849	2.0	
Turnout		43,225	95.9	
Liberal hold		Swing	−3.0	

=== Elections in the 1940s ===
==== 1949 ====
1949 Australian federal election: Petrie
Party	Candidate	Votes	%	±%
Liberal	Alan Hulme	23,803	59.7	+14.6
Labor	Samuel Martin	14,593	36.6	−7.4
Independent	James Ryan	1,488	3.7	+3.7
Total formal votes		39,884	98.3	
Informal votes		683	1.7	
Turnout		40,567	94.5	
Two-party-preferred result
Liberal	Alan Hulme		61.6	+10.8
Labor	Samuel Martin		38.4	−10.8
Liberal notional hold		Swing	+10.8	
