= Electoral results for the district of Murrumba =

Queensland, Australia, district election results

This is a list of electoral results for the electoral district of Murrumba in Queensland state elections.

== Members for Murrumba ==
Member	Party	Term
James Forsythe	Ministerialist/Opposition	1912–1918
Richard Warren	Country	1918–1932
Frank Nicklin	Country	1932–1950
David Nicholson	Country	1950–1972
Des Frawley	Country	1972–1974
Des Frawley	National	1974–1977
Joe Kruger	Labor	1977–1986
Dean Wells	Labor	1986–2012
Reg Gulley	Liberal National	2012–2015
Chris Whiting	Labor	2015–2017
Steven Miles	Labor	2017–present

== Election results ==
=== Elections in the 2020s ===
2024 Queensland state election: Murrumba
Party	Candidate	Votes	%	±%
Labor	Steven Miles	19,076	47.67	−2.87
Liberal National	Gary Fulton	12,310	30.76	+1.76
Greens	Deklan Green	2,534	6.33	−1.87
Legalise Cannabis	David Zaloudek	2,116	5.29	+5.29
One Nation	Duncan Geldenhuys	1,727	4.32	−3.18
Independent	Sarah Kropman	905	2.26	+2.26
Family First	David Todd	846	2.11	+2.11
Independent DLP	Scott Donovan	314	0.78	+0.78
Independent	Caleb Wells	191	0.48	+0.48
Total formal votes		40,019	96.25	
Informal votes		1,560	3.75	
Turnout		41,579	88.53	
Two-party-preferred result
Labor	Steven Miles	23,922	59.78	−1.62
Liberal National	Gary Fulton	16,097	40.22	+1.62
Labor hold		Swing	-1.62	

2020 Queensland state election: Murrumba
Party	Candidate	Votes	%	±%
Labor	Steven Miles	17,433	50.55	+4.89
Liberal National	Yvonne Barlow	10,016	29.04	+3.31
Greens	Jason Kennedy	2,840	8.23	−0.96
One Nation	Karen Haddock	2,571	7.45	−11.96
Shooters, Fishers, Farmers	Leichelle McMahon	961	2.79	+2.79
Independent	Stewart Clark	667	1.93	+1.93
Total formal votes		34,488	96.45	+0.89
Informal votes		1,269	3.55	−0.89
Turnout		35,757	87.06	−0.24
Two-party-preferred result
Labor	Steven Miles	21,153	61.33	+1.81
Liberal National	Yvonne Barlow	13,335	38.67	−1.81
Labor hold		Swing	+1.81	

=== Elections in the 2010s ===
2017 Queensland state election: Murrumba
Party	Candidate	Votes	%	±%
Labor	Steven Miles	14,111	45.7	−3.3
Liberal National	Reg Gulley	7,953	25.7	−14.8
One Nation	Scott Dare	6,002	19.4	+19.4
Greens	Jason Kennedy	2,841	9.2	+0.5
Total formal votes		30,907	95.6	−2.0
Informal votes		1,437	4.4	+2.0
Turnout		32,344	87.3	+2.4
Two-party-preferred result
Labor	Steven Miles	18,396	59.5	+3.2
Liberal National	Reg Gulley	12,511	40.5	−3.2
Labor hold		Swing	+3.2	

2015 Queensland state election: Murrumba
Party	Candidate	Votes	%	±%
Labor	Chris Whiting	16,997	49.45	+17.03
Liberal National	Reg Gulley	13,194	38.38	−10.73
Greens	Simone Dejun	2,131	6.20	+1.32
Family First	Ray Hutchinson	2,051	5.97	+0.29
Total formal votes		34,373	97.82	+0.11
Informal votes		767	2.18	−0.11
Turnout		35,140	89.80	−2.09
Two-party-preferred result
Labor	Chris Whiting	18,934	57.35	+16.87
Liberal National	Reg Gulley	14,079	42.65	−16.87
Labor gain from Liberal National		Swing	+16.87	

2012 Queensland state election: Murrumba
Party	Candidate	Votes	%	±%
Liberal National	Reg Gulley	14,040	49.11	+12.04
Labor	Dean Wells	9,267	32.42	−18.38
Katter's Australian	Paul Edwards	2,263	7.92	+7.92
Family First	Sally Vincent	1,622	5.67	+1.07
Greens	Rodney Blair	1,394	4.88	−2.65
Total formal votes		28,586	97.71	−0.02
Informal votes		671	2.29	+0.02
Turnout		29,257	91.89	+0.34
Two-party-preferred result
Liberal National	Reg Gulley	15,465	59.52	+16.73
Labor	Dean Wells	10,516	40.48	−16.73
Liberal National gain from Labor		Swing	+16.73	

=== Elections in the 2000s ===
2009 Queensland state election: Murrumba
Party	Candidate	Votes	%	±%
Labor	Dean Wells	12,921	50.8	−4.2
Liberal National	Peter Flannery	9,428	37.1	+4.5
Greens	Rodney Blair	1,914	7.5	+1.7
Family First	Sally Vincent	1,171	4.6	+4.6
Total formal votes		25,434	97.3	
Informal votes		591	2.7	
Turnout		26,025	91.6	
Two-party-preferred result
Labor	Dean Wells	13,745	57.2	−4.9
Liberal National	Peter Flannery	10,280	42.8	+4.9
Labor hold		Swing	−4.9	

2006 Queensland state election: Murrumba
Party	Candidate	Votes	%	±%
Labor	Dean Wells	16,646	53.9	−3.3
Liberal	Reg Gulley	10,075	32.6	−0.6
Independent	Terry Shaw	2,307	7.5	+7.5
Greens	Michael Jeffrey	1,833	5.9	−3.7
Total formal votes		30,861	97.6	+0.1
Informal votes		750	2.4	−0.1
Turnout		31,611	91.4	−1.7
Two-party-preferred result
Labor	Dean Wells	17,811	61.6	−1.1
Liberal	Reg Gulley	11,114	38.4	+1.1
Labor hold		Swing	−1.1	

2004 Queensland state election: Murrumba
Party	Candidate	Votes	%	±%
Labor	Dean Wells	15,922	57.2	−5.3
Liberal	Susan Haskell	9,247	33.2	+14.3
Greens	Rick Pass	2,669	9.6	+9.6
Total formal votes		27,838	97.5	+0.1
Informal votes		699	2.5	−0.1
Turnout		28,537	93.1	−1.1
Two-party-preferred result
Labor	Dean Wells	16,548	62.7	−8.4
Liberal	Susan Haskell	9,848	37.3	+8.4
Labor hold		Swing	−8.4	

2001 Queensland state election: Murrumba
Party	Candidate	Votes	%	±%
Labor	Dean Wells	14,839	62.5	+17.2
Liberal	Susan Haskell	4,498	18.9	−2.7
Independent	Rob McJannett	4,408	18.6	+18.6
Total formal votes		23,745	97.4	
Informal votes		635	2.6	
Turnout		24,380	94.2	
Two-party-preferred result
Labor	Dean Wells	15,500	71.1	+12.5
Liberal	Susan Haskell	6,295	28.9	+28.9
Labor hold		Swing	+12.5	

=== Elections in the 1990s ===
1998 Queensland state election: Murrumba
Party	Candidate	Votes	%	±%
Labor	Dean Wells	10,266	45.9	−11.3
One Nation	Tony Cleaver	6,429	28.8	+28.8
Liberal	Susan Haskell	4,741	21.2	−21.6
Democrats	Peter Kennedy	658	2.9	+2.9
Reform	Mark Lewry	266	1.2	+1.2
Total formal votes		22,360	98.5	+0.9
Informal votes		339	1.5	−0.9
Turnout		22,699	93.7	+0.8
Two-candidate-preferred result
Labor	Dean Wells	11,639	55.0	−2.2
One Nation	Tony Cleaver	9,509	45.0	+45.0
Labor hold		Swing	−2.2	

1995 Queensland state election: Murrumba
Party	Candidate	Votes	%	±%
Labor	Dean Wells	11,848	57.2	−5.9
Liberal	Fran Jones	8,867	42.8	+13.3
Total formal votes		20,715	97.6	+0.6
Informal votes		499	2.4	−0.6
Turnout		21,214	92.9	
Labor hold		Swing	−9.1	

1992 Queensland state election: Murrumba
Party	Candidate	Votes	%	±%
Labor	Dean Wells	12,187	63.1	+1.6
Liberal	Fran Jones	5,695	29.5	+6.4
Independent	Kevin Hendstock	1,421	7.4	+4.3
Total formal votes		19,303	97.0	
Informal votes		589	3.0	
Turnout		19,892	92.7	
Two-party-preferred result
Labor	Dean Wells	12,512	66.3	+3.0
Liberal	Fran Jones	6,364	33.7	−3.0
Labor hold		Swing	+3.0	

=== Elections in the 1980s ===
1989 Queensland state election: Murrumba
Party	Candidate	Votes	%	±%
Labor	Dean Wells	12,223	61.8	+18.5
Liberal	Patrick Seeney	4,907	24.8	+8.1
National	Phil Benson	2,663	13.4	−12.7
Total formal votes		19,793	97.3	−0.8
Informal votes		545	2.7	+0.8
Turnout		20,338	92.9	−0.3
Two-party-preferred result
Labor	Dean Wells	12,410	62.7	+7.2
Liberal	Patrick Seeney	7,383	37.3	+37.3
Labor hold		Swing	+7.2	

1986 Queensland state election: Murrumba
Party	Candidate	Votes	%	±%
Labor	Deane Wells	7,553	43.3	−7.6
National	Leslie Fletcher	4,558	26.1	−4.0
Liberal	Jenny Roberts	2,905	16.7	−2.3
Independent	Joe Kruger	2,419	13.9	+13.9
Total formal votes		17,435	98.1	
Informal votes		343	1.9	
Turnout		17,778	93.2	
Two-party-preferred result
Labor	Deane Wells	9,669	55.5	+0.4
National	Leslie Fletcher	7,766	44.5	−0.4
Labor hold		Swing	+0.4	

1983 Queensland state election: Murrumba
Party	Candidate	Votes	%	±%
Labor	Joe Kruger	10,169	50.9	+0.8
National	Allan Male	6,008	30.1	−0.5
Liberal	Roger Maguire	3,795	19.0	−0.2
Total formal votes		19,972	98.7	−0.1
Informal votes		266	1.3	+0.1
Turnout		20,238	93.1	+2.9
Two-party-preferred result
Labor	Joe Kruger	11,017	55.2	−0.2
National	Allan Male	8,955	44.8	+0.2
Labor hold		Swing	−0.2	

1980 Queensland state election: Murrumba
Party	Candidate	Votes	%	±%
Labor	Joe Kruger	8,251	50.1	+3.6
National	Yvonne Chapman	5,041	30.6	+1.3
Liberal	Alfred Shaw	3,163	19.2	−4.9
Total formal votes		16,455	98.8	+0.9
Informal votes		203	1.2	−0.9
Turnout		16,658	90.2	−2.1
Two-party-preferred result
Labor	Joe Kruger	9,121	55.4	+4.0
National	Yvonne Chapman	7,334	44.6	−4.0
Labor hold		Swing	+4.0	

=== Elections in the 1970s ===
1977 Queensland state election: Murrumba
Party	Candidate	Votes	%	±%
Labor	Joe Kruger	6,377	46.5	+6.2
Liberal	Stephen Thomason	3,306	24.1	+24.1
National	Brian Frawley	2,157	15.7	−48.0
National	Agnes Campbell	1,861	13.6	+13.6
Total formal votes		13,701	97.9	
Informal votes		13,992	92.3	
Turnout		13,992	92.3	
Two-party-preferred result
Labor	Joe Kruger	7,036	51.4	+11.1
National	Brian Frawley	6,664	48.6	−11.1
Labor gain from National		Swing	+11.1	

1974 Queensland state election: Murrumba
Party	Candidate	Votes	%	±%
National	Des Frawley	11,080	63.7	+30.1
Labor	Neville Lines	6,320	36.3	−10.0
Total formal votes		17,400	97.7	−0.5
Informal votes		415	2.3	+0.3
Turnout		17,815	89.7	−3.2
National hold		Swing	+12.7	

1972 Queensland state election: Murrumba
Party	Candidate	Votes	%	±%
Labor	Alex Barr	6,138	46.3	+1.8
Country	Des Frawley	4,444	33.6	−14.7
Liberal	Kathleen Macadam	2,020	15.2	+15.2
Queensland Labor	Paul Maguire	652	4.9	−2.3
Total formal votes		13,254	98.2	
Informal votes		249	1.8	
Turnout		13,503	92.9	
Two-party-preferred result
Country	Des Frawley	6,762	51.0	−9.1
Labor	Alex Barr	6,492	49.0	+9.1
Country hold		Swing	−9.1	

=== Elections in the 1960s ===
1969 Queensland state election: Murrumba
Party	Candidate	Votes	%	±%
Country	David Nicholson	7,715	48.3	+7.0
Labor	Reginald O'Brien	7,115	44.5	+2.7
Queensland Labor	Robert Macklin	1,155	7.2	+5.0
Total formal votes		15,985	97.8	+0.3
Informal votes		365	2.2	−0.3
Turnout		16,350	93.6	−0.4
Two-party-preferred result
Country	David Nicholson	8,659	54.2	+0.2
Labor	Reginald O'Brien	7,326	45.8	−0.2
Country hold		Swing	+0.2	

1966 Queensland state election: Murrumba
Party	Candidate	Votes	%	±%
Labor	Norm Kruger	5,179	41.8	+0.3
Country	David Nicholson	5,116	41.3	−13.3
Liberal	Nelson Cooke	1,489	12.0	+12.0
Independent	David Bishop	321	2.6	+2.6
Queensland Labor	Robert Vlug	272	2.2	−1.0
Total formal votes		12,377	97.5	−0.6
Informal votes		320	2.5	+0.6
Turnout		12,697	94.0	−0.8
Two-party-preferred result
Country	David Nicholson	6,688	54.0	−3.3
Labor	Norm Kruger	5,689	46.0	+3.3
Country hold		Swing	−3.3	

1963 Queensland state election: Murrumba
Party	Candidate	Votes	%	±%
Country	David Nicholson	5,641	54.6	−5.9
Labor	Norman Kruger	4,286	41.5	+2.0
Queensland Labor	John Carter	328	3.2	+3.2
Independent	Francis O'Mara	74	0.7	+0.7
Total formal votes		10,329	98.1	−0.2
Informal votes		200	1.9	+0.2
Turnout		10,529	94.8	+1.7
Two-party-preferred result
Country	David Nicholson	5,916	57.3	−3.2
Labor	Norman Kruger	4,413	42.7	+3.2
Country hold		Swing	−3.2	

1960 Queensland state election: Murrumba
Party	Candidate	Votes	%	±%
Country	David Nicholson	5,334	60.5	
Labor	Norm Kruger	3,481	39.5	
Total formal votes		8,815	98.3	
Informal votes		151	1.7	
Turnout		8,966	93.1	
Country hold		Swing		

=== Elections in the 1950s ===
1957 Queensland state election: Murrumba
Party	Candidate	Votes	%	±%
Country	David Nicholson	9,112	61.8	−0.2
Labor	Bertram Krause	2,868	19.5	−18.5
Queensland Labor	Michael Ryan	2,756	18.7	+18.7
Total formal votes		14,736	98.9	+0.3
Informal votes		161	1.1	−0.3
Turnout		14,897	94.9	+1.2
Country hold		Swing	+14.1	

1956 Queensland state election: Murrumba
Party	Candidate	Votes	%	±%
Country	David Nicholson	8,387	62.0	+4.2
Labor	Charles Myers	5,137	38.0	−4.2
Total formal votes		13,524	98.6	−0.6
Informal votes		187	1.4	+0.6
Turnout		13,711	93.7	+1.2
Country hold		Swing	+4.2	

1953 Queensland state election: Murrumba
Party	Candidate	Votes	%	±%
Country	David Nicholson	6,564	57.8	−7.3
Labor	Kenneth Griffith	4,801	42.2	+7.3
Total formal votes		11,365	99.2	+0.3
Informal votes		89	0.8	−0.3
Turnout		11,454	92.5	−0.7
Country hold		Swing	−7.3	

1950 Queensland state election: Murrumba
Party	Candidate	Votes	%	±%
Country	David Nicholson	6,680	65.1	
Labor	Eric Lloyd	3,579	34.9	
Total formal votes		10,259	98.9	
Informal votes		111	1.1	
Turnout		10,370	93.2	
Country hold		Swing		

=== Elections in the 1940s ===
1947 Queensland state election: Murrumba
Party	Candidate	Votes	%	±%
Country	Frank Nicklin	10,334	75.9	−24.1
Independent	Samuel Halpin	3,273	24.1	+24.1
Total formal votes		13,607	98.2	
Informal votes		249	1.8	
Turnout		13,856	91.0	
Country hold		Swing	N/A	

1944 Queensland state election: Murrumba
Party	Candidate	Votes	%	±%
Country	Frank Nicklin	unopposed		
Country hold		Swing		

1941 Queensland state election: Murrumba
Party	Candidate	Votes	%	±%
Country	Frank Nicklin	6,841	70.9	+18.0
Labor	George Watson	2,810	29.1	+11.4
Total formal votes		9,651	98.3	−0.4
Informal votes		169	1.7	+0.4
Turnout		9,820	90.3	−4.8
Country hold		Swing	N/A	

=== Elections in the 1930s ===
1938 Queensland state election: Murrumba
Party	Candidate	Votes	%	±%
Country	Frank Nicklin	4,930	52.9	−10.9
Social Credit	Geoffrey Nichols	2,733	29.4	+29.4
Labor	George Watson	1,648	17.7	+17.7
Total formal votes		9,311	98.7	+1.5
Informal votes		118	1.3	−1.5
Turnout		9,429	95.1	+0.4
Country hold		Swing	N/A	

- Preferences were not distributed.

1935 Queensland state election: Murrumba
Party	Candidate	Votes	%	±%
CPNP	Frank Nicklin	5,373	63.8	
Independent	Alfred Langdon	3,049	36.2	
Total formal votes		8,422	97.2	
Informal votes		238	2.8	
Turnout		8,660	94.7	
CPNP hold		Swing		

1932 Queensland state election: Murrumba
Party	Candidate	Votes	%	±%
CPNP	Frank Nicklin	4,206	61.1	
Labor	David Moorcroft	2,271	33.0	
Queensland Party	William Bradley	410	5.9	
Total formal votes		6,887	98.7	
Informal votes		88	1.3	
Turnout		6,975	93.3	
CPNP hold		Swing		

- Preferences were not distributed.

=== Elections in the 1920s ===
1929 Queensland state election: Murrumba
Party	Candidate	Votes	%	±%
CPNP	Richard Warren	3,473	54.0	−14.9
Independent	Ernest Coghlan	2,458	38.2	+38.2
Independent	Alfred O'Loan	504	7.8	+4.9
Total formal votes		6,435	97.7	−0.1
Informal votes		154	2.3	+0.1
CPNP hold		Swing	N/A	

1926 Queensland state election: Murrumba
Party	Candidate	Votes	%	±%
CPNP	Richard Warren	4,151	68.9	+17.7
Labor	William Friis	1,699	28.2	+1.8
Independent	Alfred O'Loan	175	2.9	+2.9
Total formal votes		6,025	97.8	−0.9
Informal votes		135	2.2	+0.9
Turnout		6,160	82.1	+4.6
CPNP hold		Swing	N/A	

1923 Queensland state election: Murrumba
Party	Candidate	Votes	%	±%
United	Richard Warren	2,982	51.2	+3.7
Labor	David Moorcroft	1,538	26.4	+6.5
Total formal votes		5,821	98.7	−0.1
Informal votes		75	1.3	+0.1
Turnout		5,896	77.5	+1.3
United hold		Swing	N/A	

1920 Queensland state election: Murrumba
Party	Candidate	Votes	%	±%
Country	Richard Warren	3,598	47.5	+47.5
National	George Pritchard	2,473	32.6	−33.5
Labor	John Forde	1,507	19.9	−14.0
Total formal votes		7,578	98.8	+0.3
Informal votes		94	1.2	−0.3
Turnout		7,672	76.2	−5.2
Two-candidate-preferred result
Country	Richard Warren	2,803	59.8	+59.8
National	George Pritchard	2,559	40.2	−25.9
Country gain from National		Swing	N/A	

=== Elections in the 1910s ===
1918 Queensland state election: Murrumba
Party	Candidate	Votes	%	±%
National	Richard Warren	4,118	66.1	+1.2
Labor	Arthur Sampson	2,113	33.9	−1.2
Total formal votes		6,231	98.9	+0.1
Informal votes		70	1.1	−0.1
Turnout		6,301	81.4	−9.7
National hold		Swing	+1.2	

1915 Queensland state election: Murrumba
Party	Candidate	Votes	%	±%
Liberal	James Forsyth	3,099	64.9	−12.3
Labor	Arthur Sampson	1,677	35.1	+12.3
Total formal votes		4,779	98.8	−0.3
Informal votes		59	1.2	+0.3
Turnout		4,835	91.1	+20.0
Liberal hold		Swing	−12.3	

1912 Queensland state election: Murrumba
Party	Candidate	Votes	%	±%
Liberal	James Forsythe	2,400	77.7	
Labor	Gideon Dennis	688	22.3	
Total formal votes		3,088	99.1	
Informal votes		29	0.9	
Turnout		3,117	71.1	
Liberal hold		Swing		
