= Electoral results for the district of Stafford =

Queensland, Australia, district election results

This is a list of electoral results for the electoral district of Stafford in Queensland state elections.

== Members for Stafford ==
First incarnation (1972–1992)
Member	Party	Term
Roy Harvey	Labor	1972–1974
Terry Gygar	Liberal	1974–1983
Denis Murphy	Labor	1983–1984
Terry Gygar	Liberal	1984–1989
Rod Welford	Labor	1989–1992
Second incarnation (2001–present)
Member	Party	Term
Terry Sullivan	Labor	2001–2006
Stirling Hinchliffe	Labor	2006–2012
Chris Davis	Liberal National	2012–2014
Anthony Lynham	Labor	2014–2020
Jimmy Sullivan	Labor	2020–2025
Jimmy Sullivan	Independent	2025–present
Luke Richmond	Labor	2026–present

== Election results ==
=== Elections in the 2020s ===
2024 Queensland state election: Stafford
Party	Candidate	Votes	%	±%
Labor	Jimmy Sullivan	13,856	38.77	−6.83
Liberal National	Fiona Hammond	13,605	38.06	+6.16
Greens	Jess Lane	6,456	18.06	+1.66
One Nation	Stuart Andrews	1,134	3.17	+0.17
Family First	Alan Denaro	692	1.94	+1.94
Total formal votes		35,743	97.36	
Informal votes		971	2.64	
Turnout		36,714	90.23	
Two-party-preferred result
Labor	Jimmy Sullivan	19,774	55.32	−6.58
Liberal National	Fiona Hammond	15,969	44.68	+6.58
Labor hold		Swing	-6.58	

2020 Queensland state election: Stafford
Party	Candidate	Votes	%	±%
Labor	Jimmy Sullivan	15,472	45.57	−2.53
Liberal National	Ed Sangjitphun	10,837	31.92	−1.72
Greens	Stephen Bates	5,578	16.43	−1.85
One Nation	Kerrie Dwyer	1,006	2.96	+2.96
Civil Liberties & Motorists	Jeff Hodges	644	1.90	+1.90
Independent	Anthony Conciatore	417	1.23	+1.23
Total formal votes		33,954	97.62	+1.52
Informal votes		827	2.38	−1.52
Turnout		34,781	89.35	+1.07
Two-party-preferred result
Labor	Jimmy Sullivan	21,012	61.88	−0.22
Liberal National	Ed Sangjitphun	12,942	38.12	+0.22
Labor hold		Swing	−0.22	

=== Elections in the 2010s ===
2017 Queensland state election: Stafford
Party	Candidate	Votes	%	±%
Labor	Anthony Lynham	15,357	48.1	+0.4
Liberal National	Ed Sangjitphun	10,739	33.6	−3.9
Greens	John Meyer	5,835	18.3	+4.7
Total formal votes		31,931	96.1	−2.2
Informal votes		1,296	3.9	+2.2
Turnout		33,227	88.3	−1.6
Two-party-preferred result
Labor	Anthony Lynham	19,830	62.1	+2.8
Liberal National	Ed Sangjitphun	12,101	37.9	−2.8
Labor hold		Swing	+2.8	

2015 Queensland state election: Stafford
Party	Candidate	Votes	%	±%
Labor	Anthony Lynham	13,824	48.14	+14.57
Liberal National	Bob Andersen	10,822	37.69	−12.54
Greens	Anne Boccabella	4,069	14.17	+2.87
Total formal votes		28,715	98.35	+0.25
Informal votes		482	1.65	−0.25
Turnout		29,197	91.16	−0.20
Two-party-preferred result
Labor	Anthony Lynham	16,590	59.59	+16.65
Liberal National	Bob Andersen	11,249	40.41	−16.65
Labor hold		Swing	+16.65	

2014 Stafford state by-election
Party	Candidate	Votes	%	±%
Labor	Anthony Lynham	12,626	50.6	+17.1
Liberal National	Bob Andersen	8,339	33.4	−16.8
Greens	Anne Boccabella	2,971	11.9	+0.6
Family First	Sally-Anne Vincent	997	4.0	+4.0
Total formal votes		24,933	98.1	−0.0
Informal votes		485	1.9	+0.0
Turnout		25,418	81.5	−9.8
Two-party-preferred result
Labor	Anthony Lynham	14,562	62.0	+19.1
Liberal National	Bob Andersen	8,925	38.0	−19.1
Labor gain from Liberal National		Swing	+19.1	

2012 Queensland state election: Stafford
Party	Candidate	Votes	%	±%
Liberal National	Chris Davis	13,423	50.23	+12.35
Labor	Stirling Hinchliffe	8,972	33.58	−14.87
Greens	Peter Jeremijenko	3,020	11.30	−0.49
Katter's Australian	Karin Hunter	1,307	4.89	+4.89
Total formal votes		26,722	98.10	−0.11
Informal votes		517	1.90	+0.11
Turnout		27,239	91.36	+0.02
Two-party-preferred result
Liberal National	Chris Davis	14,302	57.06	+14.35
Labor	Stirling Hinchliffe	10,763	42.94	−14.35
Liberal National gain from Labor		Swing	+14.35	

=== Elections in the 2000s ===
2009 Queensland state election: Stafford
Party	Candidate	Votes	%	±%
Labor	Stirling Hinchliffe	12,870	48.4	−5.9
Liberal National	Brad Carswell	10,062	37.9	+7.3
Greens	Tristan Peach	3,133	11.8	−0.1
Family First	Paul Fomiatti	499	1.9	+1.8
Total formal votes		26,564	98.1	
Informal votes		484	1.9	
Turnout		27,048	91.3	
Two-party-preferred result
Labor	Stirling Hinchliffe	14,460	57.3	−6.9
Liberal National	Brad Carswell	10,778	42.7	+6.9
Labor hold		Swing	−6.9	

2006 Queensland state election: Stafford
Party	Candidate	Votes	%	±%
Labor	Stirling Hinchliffe	13,288	55.5	−3.6
Liberal	Brad Carswell	7,165	29.9	-0.0
Greens	Sam Clifford	2,588	10.8	−0.2
Independent	Jim Dooley	901	3.8	+3.8
Total formal votes		23,942	98.0	−0.0
Informal votes		484	2.0	+0.0
Turnout		24,426	91.0	−0.6
Two-party-preferred result
Labor	Stirling Hinchliffe	14,564	64.9	−1.4
Liberal	Brad Carswell	7,880	35.1	+1.4
Labor hold		Swing	−1.4	

2004 Queensland state election: Stafford
Party	Candidate	Votes	%	±%
Labor	Terry Sullivan	14,262	59.1	−6.3
Liberal	Christopher Kelly	7,207	29.9	+5.7
Greens	Sue Meehan	2,665	11.0	+0.5
Total formal votes		24,134	98.0	+0.3
Informal votes		482	2.0	−0.3
Turnout		24,616	91.6	−1.7
Two-party-preferred result
Labor	Terry Sullivan	15,274	66.3	−6.1
Liberal	Christopher Kelly	7,751	33.7	+6.1
Labor hold		Swing	−6.1	

2001 Queensland state election: Stafford
Party	Candidate	Votes	%	±%
Labor	Terry Sullivan	16,190	65.4	+13.8
Liberal	Zenia Belcher	5,982	24.2	−2.8
Greens	Sue Meehan	2,590	10.5	+10.5
Total formal votes		24,762	97.7	
Informal votes		591	2.3	
Turnout		25,353	93.3	
Two-party-preferred result
Labor	Terry Sullivan	17,052	72.4	+10.1
Liberal	Zenia Belcher	6,503	27.6	−10.1
Labor hold		Swing	+10.1	

=== Elections in the 1980s ===
1989 Queensland state election: Stafford
Party	Candidate	Votes	%	±%
Labor	Rod Welford	10,004	54.4	+11.8
Liberal	Terry Gygar	5,803	31.5	+3.9
National	Robert Hutchinson	1,735	9.4	−16.9
Democrats	Gayle Woodrow	858	4.7	+1.3
Total formal votes		18,400	97.8	−0.6
Informal votes		417	2.2	+0.6
Turnout		18,817	95.2	+1.4
Two-party-preferred result
Labor	Rod Welford	10,598	57.6	+12.1
Liberal	Terry Gygar	7,802	42.4	−12.1
Labor gain from Liberal		Swing	+12.1	

1986 Queensland state election: Stafford
Party	Candidate	Votes	%	±%
Labor	Janine Walker	7,560	42.6	−2.6
Liberal	Terry Gygar	4,901	27.6	−0.1
National	Robert Hutschinson	4,666	26.3	−1.0
Democrats	Marjorie Blair-West	602	3.4	+3.4
Total formal votes		17,729	98.4	−0.2
Informal votes		288	1.6	+0.2
Turnout		18,017	93.8	+5.7
Two-party-preferred result
Liberal	Terry Gygar	9,656	54.5	+3.7
Labor	Janine Walker	8,073	45.5	−3.7
Liberal hold		Swing	+3.7	

1984 Stafford state by-election
Party	Candidate	Votes	%	±%
Labor	Janine Walker	6,764	45.17	−1.18
Liberal	Terry Gygar	4,215	27.55	+2.63
National	Pat Blake	4,048	27.28	−1.45
Total formal votes		14,973	98.64	−0.04
Informal votes		206	1.36	+0.04
Turnout		15,179	88.12	−4.63
Two-party-preferred result
Liberal	Terry Gygar	8,063	53.85	+53.85
Labor	Janine Walker	6,910	46.15	−3.97
Liberal gain from Labor		Swing	N/A	

1983 Queensland state election: Stafford
Party	Candidate	Votes	%	±%
Labor	Denis Murphy	7,301	46.4	−2.9
National	Patrick Blake	4,525	28.7	+28.7
Liberal	Terry Gygar	3,923	24.9	−25.8
Total formal votes		15,749	98.7	+0.7
Informal votes		311	2.0	−0.7
Turnout		15,960	92.8	+2.3
Two-party-preferred result
Labor	Denis Murphy	7,894	50.1	+0.8
National	Patrick Blake	7,855	49.9	+49.9
Labor gain from Liberal		Swing	+0.8	

1980 Queensland state election: Stafford
Party	Candidate	Votes	%	±%
Liberal	Terry Gygar	7,584	50.7	+0.1
Labor	Brian Mellifont	7,385	49.3	−0.1
Total formal votes		14,969	98.0	−0.8
Informal votes		311	2.0	+0.8
Turnout		15,280	90.5	−2.4
Liberal hold		Swing	+0.1	

=== Elections in the 1970s ===
1977 Queensland state election: Stafford
Party	Candidate	Votes	%	±%
Liberal	Terry Gygar	7,521	50.5	−7.0
Labor	Roy Harvey	7,357	49.5	+12.2
Total formal votes		14,878	98.8	
Informal votes		180	1.2	
Turnout		15,058	92.9	
Liberal hold		Swing	−10.6	

1974 Queensland state election: Stafford
Party	Candidate	Votes	%	±%
Liberal	Terry Gygar	8,034	57.5	+16.8
Labor	Roy Harvey	5,211	37.3	−12.2
Queensland Labor	Edward Doherty	603	4.3	−5.5
Independent	Laurence Gormley	130	0.9	+0.9
Total formal votes		13,978	98.9	+3.5
Informal votes		156	1.1	−3.5
Turnout		14,134	90.5	−3.8
Two-party-preferred result
Liberal	Terry Gygar	8,628	61.7	+13.3
Labor	Roy Harvey	5,350	38.3	−13.3
Liberal gain from Labor		Swing	+13.3	

1972 Queensland state election: Stafford
Party	Candidate	Votes	%	±%
Labor	Roy Harvey	5,872	49.5	
Liberal	Percy Smith	4,834	40.7	
Queensland Labor	James Hancock	1,163	9.8	
Total formal votes		11,869	95.4	
Informal votes		545	4.6	
Turnout		12,414	94.3	
Two-party-preferred result
Labor	Roy Harvey	6,119	51.6	−0.8
Liberal	Percy Smith	5,750	48.4	+0.8
Labor hold		Swing	−0.8	
