= Murrumba =

Murrumba may refer to:

- Murrumba Homestead Grounds, the homestead of Thomas Petrie in Petrie, Queensland, Australia
- Electoral district of Murrumba, an electoral district in Queensland, Australia
  - Electoral results for the district of Murrumba
- Murrumba Downs, Queensland, a suburb in Queensland, Australia
  - Murrumba Downs railway station
