= Electoral results for the district of Bancroft =

Queensland, Australia, district election results

This is a list of electoral results for the electoral district of Bancroft in Queensland state elections.

== Members for Bancroft ==
Member	Party	Term
Chris Whiting	Labor	2017–present

== Election results ==
=== Elections in the 2020s ===
2024 Queensland state election: Bancroft
Party	Candidate	Votes	%	±%
Labor	Chris Whiting	16,141	46.86	−6.74
Liberal National	Rob Barridge	12,150	35.28	+6.92
One Nation	Matthew Langfield	2,605	7.57	−1.20
Greens	Gabrielle Unverzagt	2,499	7.26	+1.28
Independent	Barry Grant	1,046	3.04	−0.25
Total formal votes		34,441	96.24	−0.26
Informal votes		1,345	3.76	+0.26
Turnout		35,786	87.91	+1.71
Two-party-preferred result
Labor	Chris Whiting	19,289	56.01	−6.79
Liberal National	Rob Barridge	15,152	43.99	+6.79
Labor hold		Swing	-6.79	

2020 Queensland state election: Bancroft
Party	Candidate	Votes	%	±%
Labor	Chris Whiting	16,301	53.60	+10.63
Liberal National	Phil Carlson	8,626	28.36	+1.60
One Nation	Nik Aai Reddy	2,666	8.77	−10.30
Greens	Ell-Leigh Ackerman	1,820	5.98	−0.23
Independent	Barry Grant	1,001	3.29	−1.71
Total formal votes		30,414	96.76	+1.03
Informal votes		1,017	3.24	−1.03
Turnout		31,431	86.20	−1.27
Two-party-preferred result
Labor	Chris Whiting	19,100	62.80	+6.59
Liberal National	Phil Carlson	11,314	37.20	−6.59
Labor hold		Swing	+6.59	

=== Elections in the 2010s ===
2017 Queensland state election: Bancroft
Party	Candidate	Votes	%	±%
Labor	Chris Whiting	12,252	43.0	−7.2
Liberal National	Kara Thomas	7,631	26.8	−10.7
One Nation	Chris Boulis	5,438	19.1	+19.1
Greens	Simone Dejun	1,772	6.2	−0.1
Independent	Barry Grant	1,425	5.0	+5.0
Total formal votes		28,518	95.7	−2.1
Informal votes		1,270	4.3	+2.1
Turnout		29,788	87.5	+6.4
Two-party-preferred result
Labor	Chris Whiting	16,029	56.2	−2.1
Liberal National	Kara Thomas	12,489	43.8	+2.1
Labor hold		Swing	−2.1	
