= 1984 Stafford state by-election =

A by-election was held in the Legislative Assembly of Queensland seat of Stafford on 4 August 1984. It was triggered by the death of sitting Labor member Denis Murphy.

The seat was lost to the Liberal Party with the election of candidate Terry Gygar.

== Background ==
Previously an academic with strong ties to the Labor Party, Denis Murphy was first elected to state parliament at the 1983 state election to the seat of Stafford. He defeated sitting member Terry Gygar of the Liberal Party, who had been relegated to third place in the contest behind Murphy and National Party candidate Pat Blake. On 21 June 1984, Murphy died of cancer.

Commentators viewed Labor as having the most to lose, although it could gain from any anti-government swing. The Liberals had the most to gain — the by-election gave them an unexpectedly early chance to gain lost ground and to re-establish themselves as a legitimate force in Queensland politics after their relegation to minor party status after the 1983 election.

== Candidates ==
To defend the seat Labor chose ABC personality Janine Walker. The Liberal Party and the National Party chose the same candidates who stood in Stafford at the previous election; Terry Gygar—who had held the seat from 1974 to 1983—and Pat Blake respectively.

== Results ==
With National candidate Pat Blake finishing narrowly behind the Liberal Party's Terry Gygar, the instant runoff was between Gygar and Labor's Janine Walker. Though winning a clear plurality of the primary vote, Walker was starved of National Party preferences—more than 96 per cent of National preferences flowed to the Liberal Party—and lost to Gygar by 1,153 votes.

It was determined that some 17 to 18 per cent of Liberal voters ordered the Labor candidate ahead of the National candidate on their ballots. Thus if Blake's primary vote had eclipsed that of Gygar's, the distribution of preferences may have delivered the seat to Labor.

Stafford state by-election, 1984
Party	Candidate	Votes	%	±%
Labor	Janine Walker	6,764	45.17	−1.18
Liberal	Terry Gygar	4,215	27.55	+2.63
National	Pat Blake	4,048	27.28	−1.45
Total formal votes		14,973	98.64	−0.04
Informal votes		206	1.36	+0.04
Turnout		15,179	88.12	−4.63
Two-party-preferred result
Liberal	Terry Gygar	8,063	53.85	+53.85
Labor	Janine Walker	6,910	46.15	−3.97
Liberal gain from Labor		Swing	N/A	

== See also ==
- List of Queensland state by-elections
