= Division of Petrie =

Australian federal electoral division

Coordinates: 27.246°S 153.039°E

Petrie Australian House of Representatives Division
- Interactive map of boundaries since the 2019 federal election
- Created: 1949
- MP: Emma Comer
- Party: Labor
- Namesake: Andrew Petrie
- Electors: 134,418 (2025)
- Area: 152 km^{2} (58.7 sq mi)
- Demographic: Outer metropolitan
Electorates around Petrie:
Longman	Moreton Bay	Moreton Bay
Dickson	Petrie	Moreton Bay
Dickson	Lilley	Moreton Bay

The Division of Petrie is an Australian Electoral Division in Queensland.

== History ==
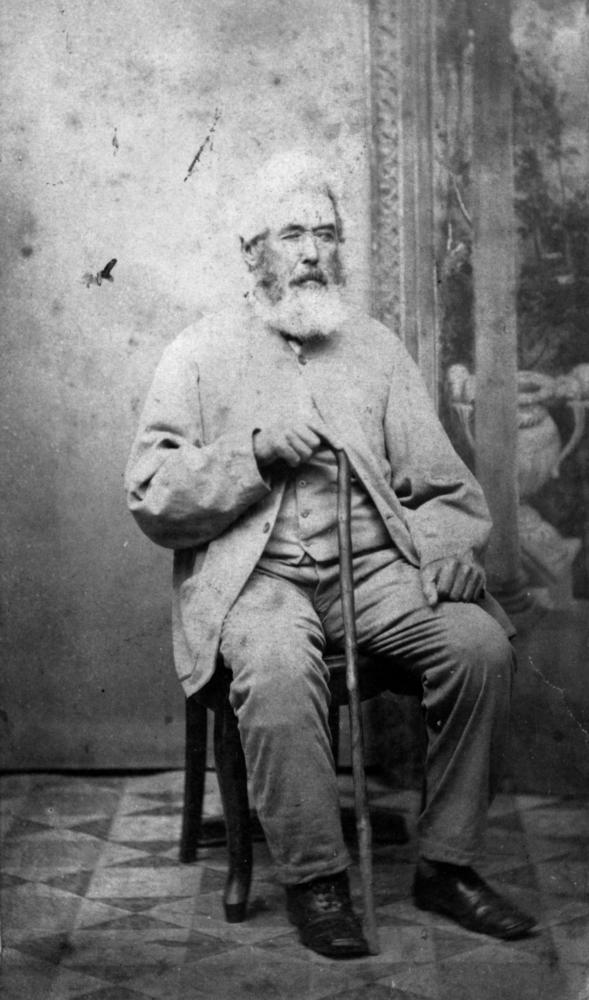
Andrew Petrie, the division's namesake

The division was created in 1949 and named after Andrew Petrie (1798–1872), a noted civil engineer, pioneer, and explorer, and the first free settler in Brisbane (1837).

The electorate has a higher-than-average percentage of pensioners and self-funded retirees, and is mainly residential, with some light industrial and commercial activities.

Originally a safe Liberal seat, it has become much more marginal since the late 1970s. From 1975 to 2022, it was held by the party of government for all but one term.

Ahead of the 2016 federal election, ABC psephologist Antony Green listed the seat in his election guide as one of eleven which he classed as bellwether electorates.

In the 2022 federal election, Luke Howarth retained the seat with 54.4% of the vote, resulting in the seat becoming marginal after the election.

In the 2025 federal election, Labor candidate Emma Comer won the seat from incumbent Liberal National MP Luke Howarth with 51.01% of the two-party-preferred vote, marking a 5.45% swing to Labor. This result ended over a decade of Liberal National control.

== Boundaries ==
Since 1984, federal electoral division boundaries in Australia have been determined at redistributions by a redistribution committee appointed by the Australian Electoral Commission. Redistributions occur for the boundaries of divisions in a particular state, and they occur every seven years, or sooner if a state's representation entitlement changes or when divisions of a state are malapportioned.

Petrie is located in the northern suburbs of Brisbane, and since a redistribution ahead of the 2010 Federal Election has been centred on the Redcliffe Peninsula.

In the City of Moreton Bay, it includes Clontarf, Kippa-Ring, Margate, Redcliffe, Rothwell, Deception Bay, Scarborough, Woody Point, North Lakes, Mango Hill, Griffin and part of Burpengary.

In the City of Brisbane, it includes Bald Hills, Bracken Ridge, Carseldine and Fitzgibbon, and parts of Aspley and Bridgeman Downs.

== Members ==
Image	Member	Party	Term	Notes
	Alan Hulme (1907–1989)	Liberal	10 December 1949 – 9 December 1961	Served as minister under Menzies. Lost seat
	Reginald O'Brien (1926–1999)	Labor	9 December 1961 – 30 November 1963	Lost seat
	Sir Alan Hulme (1907–1989)	Liberal	30 November 1963 – 2 November 1972	Served as minister under Menzies, Holt, McEwen, Gorton and McMahon. Retired
	Marshall Cooke (1938–)	Liberal	2 December 1972 – 11 April 1974	Lost preselection and retired
	John Hodges (1937–2024)	Liberal	18 May 1974 – 5 March 1983	Served as minister under Fraser. Lost seat
	Dean Wells (1949–)	Labor	5 March 1983 – 1 December 1984	Lost seat. Later elected to the Legislative Assembly of Queensland seat of Murrumba in 1986
	John Hodges (1937–2024)	Liberal	1 December 1984 – 11 July 1987	Previous member. Lost seat
	Gary Johns (1952–)	Labor	11 July 1987 – 2 March 1996	Served as minister under Keating. Lost seat
	Teresa Gambaro (1958–)	Liberal	2 March 1996 – 24 November 2007	Lost seat. Later elected to the Division of Brisbane in 2010
	Yvette D'Ath (1970–)	Labor	24 November 2007 – 7 September 2013	Lost seat. Later elected to the Legislative Assembly of Queensland seat of Redcliffe in 2014
	Luke Howarth (1972–)	Liberal (Note: Member of the Liberal National Party of Queensland sitting with the federal parliamentary Liberal Party.)	7 September 2013 – 3 May 2025	Lost seat
	Emma Comer (1994–)	Labor	3 May 2025 – present	Incumbent

== Election results ==
2025 Australian federal election: Petrie
Party	Candidate	Votes	%	±%
Liberal National	Luke Howarth	44,196	37.84	−5.65
Labor	Emma Comer	42,538	36.42	+6.40
Greens	Nikil Paul	13,802	11.82	+0.40
One Nation	Nicole Shires	7,848	6.72	+1.45
Trumpet of Patriots	Ryan Mensink	4,685	4.01	+4.01
Family First	Sharan Hall	3,723	3.19	+3.19
Total formal votes		116,792	96.89	+0.43
Informal votes		3,746	3.11	−0.43
Turnout		120,538	89.71	+1.25
Two-party-preferred result
Labor	Emma Comer	59,761	51.17	+5.61
Liberal National	Luke Howarth	57,031	48.83	−5.61
Labor gain from Liberal National		Swing	+5.61	

2022 Australian federal election: Petrie
Party	Candidate	Votes	%	±%
Liberal National	Luke Howarth	46,325	43.49	−4.62
Labor	Mick Denton	31,972	30.02	−0.84
Greens	Will Simon	12,169	11.42	+2.68
United Australia	Kelly Guenoun	5,914	5.55	+2.24
One Nation	Marcus Mitchell	5,613	5.27	−2.25
Animal Justice	Chris Cicchitti	2,331	2.19	+2.19
Liberal Democrats	Anneke Wilson	2,189	2.06	+2.06
Total formal votes		106,513	96.46	+0.08
Informal votes		3,913	3.54	−0.08
Turnout		110,426	88.46	−2.84
Two-party-preferred result
Liberal National	Luke Howarth	57,981	54.44	−3.96
Labor	Mick Denton	48,532	45.56	+3.96
Liberal National hold		Swing	−3.96	

Alluvial diagram for preference flows in the seat of Petrie in the 2022 federal election. indicates at what stage the winning candidate had over 50% of the votes and was declared the winner.
