= Alan Hulme =

Australian politician

The Honourable Sir Alan Hulme KBE
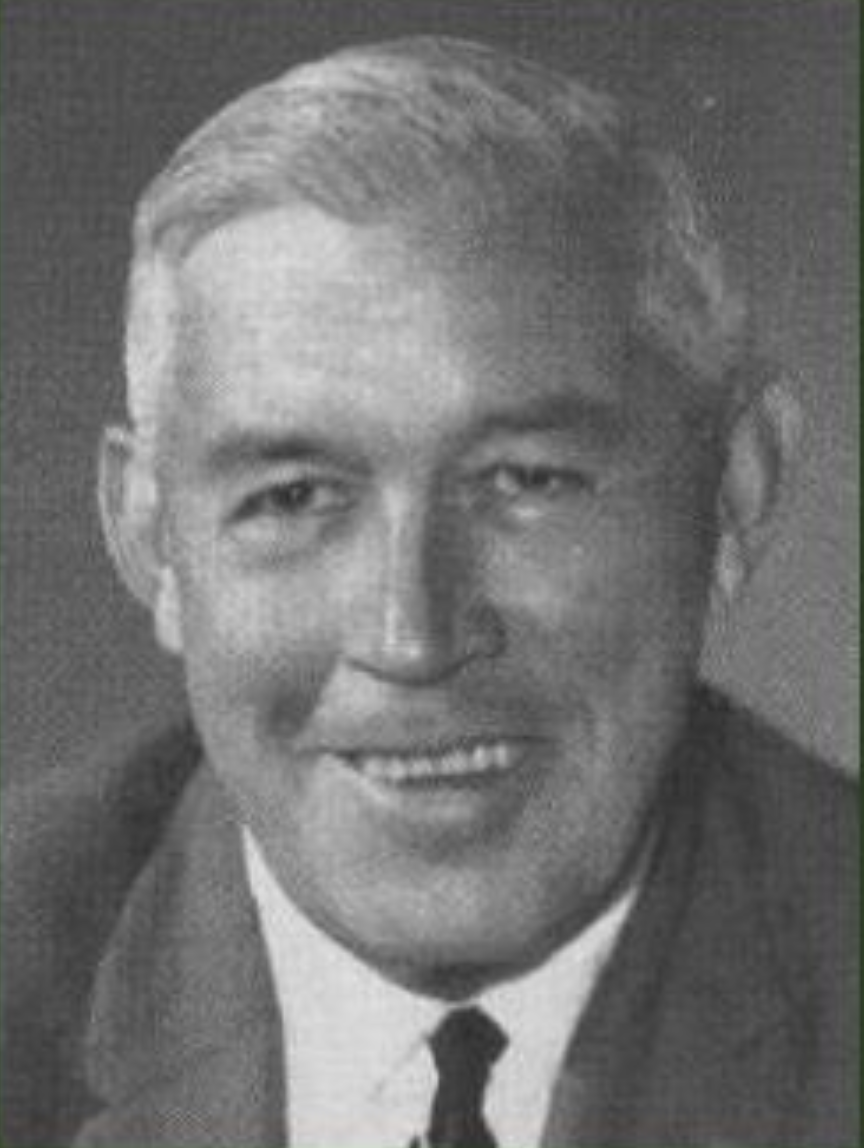

Postmaster-General of Australia
- In office 18 December 1963 – 5 December 1972
- Prime Minister: Robert Menzies; Harold Holt; John McEwen; William McMahon
- Preceded by: Charles Davidson
- Succeeded by: Lance Barnard

Vice-President of the Executive Council
- In office 26 January 1966 – 5 December 1972
- Prime Minister: Harold Holt; John McEwen; William McMahon
- Preceded by: William McMahon
- Succeeded by: Lance Barnard

Minister for Supply
- In office 22 December 1961 – 18 December 1963
- Prime Minister: Harold Holt
- Preceded by: Athol Townley
- Succeeded by: Allen Fairhall

Member of the Australian Parliament for Petrie
- In office 10 December 1949 – 9 December 1961
- Preceded by: Seat established
- Succeeded by: Reginald O'Brien
- In office 30 November 1963 – 2 November 1972
- Preceded by: Reginald O'Brien
- Succeeded by: Marshall Cooke

Personal details
- Born: 14 February 1907 Mosman, New South Wales
- Died: 9 October 1989 (aged 82) Nambour
- Party: Liberal Party of Australia
- Occupation: Accountant

Sir Alan Shallcross Hulme KBE (14 February 1907 – 9 October 1989) was an Australian politician, accountant and cattle breeder. He was born in the Sydney suburb of Mosman and was educated at North Sydney Boys High School. He moved to Queensland before World War II, where he practised as an accountant. He was a founding member of the Queensland People's Party and was its president in 1949, when it merged with the Liberal Party.

Hulme won the House of Representatives seat of Petrie at its creation at the 1949 election for the Liberal Party. He was Minister for Supply from 1958 to his defeat in the 1961 election by Reginald O'Brien. He won Petrie back at the 1963 election and became Postmaster-General until his retirement at the 1972 election. He was also Vice-President of the Executive Council from 1966 to 1972. As Postmaster-General, he was responsible for the introduction of an Australian-owned satellite system in 1970, Aussat, which was later privatised as Optus. In 1972 he was involved in the decision to impose health warnings on cigarette advertising. He was also responsible for the controversial decision to build Black Mountain Tower in Canberra. In 1972 he announced that colour television would be introduced in Australia from 1 March 1975, by which time he had retired from politics and his party was out of office.

Hulme was made a Knight Commander of the Order of the British Empire in January 1971. He died in 1989, survived by two sons and a daughter.

== Notes ==
Political offices
Preceded by Athol Townley	Minister for Supply; 1958–1961	Succeeded by Allen Fairhall
Preceded by Charles Davidson	Postmaster-General; 1963–1972	Succeeded by Lionel Bowen
Preceded by William McMahon	Vice-President of the Executive Council; 1966–1972	Succeeded by Don Willesee
Parliament of Australia
New division	Member for Petrie; 1949–1961	Succeeded by Reginald O'Brien
Preceded by Reginald O'Brien	Member for Petrie; 1963–1972	Succeeded by Marshall Cooke
