= John Hodges (Australian politician) =

Australian politician (1937–2024)

The Honourable John Hodges
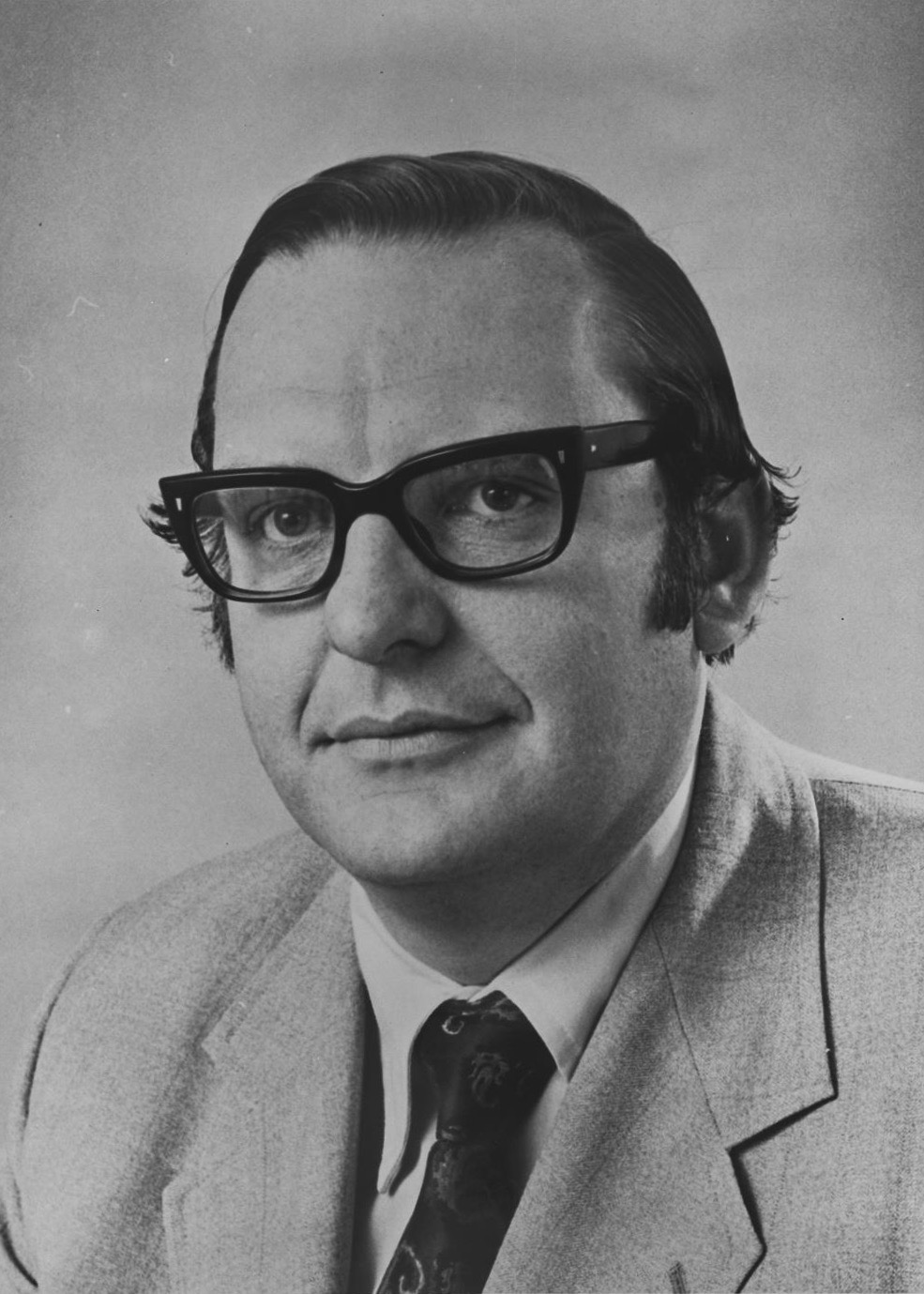

Minister for Immigration and Ethnic Affairs
- In office 7 May 1982 – 11 March 1983
- Prime Minister: Malcolm Fraser
- Preceded by: Ian Macphee
- Succeeded by: Stewart West

Member of the Australian Parliament for Petrie
- In office 1 December 1984 – 11 July 1987
- Preceded by: Dean Wells
- Succeeded by: Gary Johns
- In office 18 May 1974 – 5 March 1983
- Preceded by: Marshall Cooke
- Succeeded by: Dean Wells

Personal details
- Born: 3 October 1937 Brisbane, Queensland, Australia
- Died: 14 November 2024 (aged 87)
- Party: Liberal Party of Australia
- Occupation: Pharmacist

John Charles Hodges (3 October 1937 – 14 November 2024) was an Australian politician. A member of the Liberal Party, he served as Minister for Immigration and Ethnic Affairs in the Fraser government from 1982 to 1983. He was a member of the House of Representatives from 1974 to 1983 and from 1984 to 1987, representing the Queensland seat of Petrie.

== Early life ==
Hodges was born in Brisbane on 3 October 1937. He was raised in Cooktown, Queensland.

Hodges was a pharmaceutical chemist by profession. He served on the Redcliffe City Council from 1967 to 1976, including as deputy mayor from 1970.

== Politics ==
Hodges was elected to the Liberal Party's Queensland state executive in 1973. The following year, he defeated incumbent single-term MP Marshall Cooke for Liberal preselection in the seat of Petrie. He retained the seat for the Liberal Party at the 1974 election.

In 1978, Hodges was appointed deputy government whip in the House of Representatives. He was appointed Minister for Immigration and Ethnic Affairs in the Fraser government in May 1982 following a ministerial reshuffle. As immigration minister, he supported the government's official policy of multiculturalism. At a policy forum in August 1982 he stated that Australia had never been a monocultural society, but that "multiculturalism can become a reality only when it is accepted by the nation as a whole".

Hodges lost his seat to the Australian Labor Party (ALP) candidate Dean Wells at the 1983 election. However, he reclaimed Petrie for the Liberal Party at the 1984 election. He supported John Howard against Andrew Peacock in the 1985 Liberal leadership spill. He narrowly lost Petrie a second time at the 1987 election, following the National Party's decision to run a candidate against him in support of "Joh for Canberra" campaign.

== Later life and death ==
In 1987, Hodges and his wife purchased what was then the only pharmacy on Bribie Island, located at Bongaree. They eventually came to own or part-own another three pharmacies on the island, before retiring in 2018. Hodges died on 14 November 2024, at the age of 87.

Political offices
Preceded by Ian Macphee	Minister for Immigration and Ethnic Affairs; 1982–1983	Succeeded by Stewart West
Parliament of Australia
Preceded by Marshall Cooke	Member for Petrie; 1974–1983	Succeeded by Dean Wells
Preceded by Dean Wells	Member for Petrie; 1984–1987	Succeeded by Gary Johns
