= Reginald O'Brien =

Australian politician

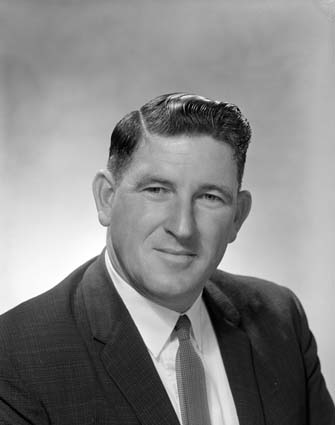

Member of the Australian Parliament for Petrie
- In office 9 December 1961 – 30 November 1963
- Preceded by: Alan Hulme
- Succeeded by: Alan Hulme

Personal details
- Born: 23 January 1926 Newcastle, New South Wales
- Died: 20 April 1999 (aged 73)
- Party: Australian Labor Party
- Occupation: Public servant

Reginald Charles O'Brien (23 January 1926 – 20 April 1999) was an Australian politician. He was an Australian Labor Party member of the Australian House of Representatives from 1961 to 1963, representing the Queensland electorate of Petrie.

O'Brien was born in Newcastle, New South Wales. He served in the Royal Australian Air Force during World War II from 1944 to 1946, seeing action in New Guinea and being discharged with the rank of leading aircraftman. Prior to entering politics, he was superintendent of the waterside employment bureau of the Australian Stevedoring Authority for sixteen years.

He was elected to the House of Representatives at the 1961 federal election, defeating Liberal Party minister Alan Hulme. His defeat of Hulme in what had been regarded as a safe Liberal seat was viewed as a surprise. During his time in parliament, he opened a drive-in constituent service with the slogan "Call on Reg", which saw more than 1000 visits in eighteen months.

O'Brien was outspoken around employment issues, especially on the wharves: he argued that employment was a government responsibility which the Menzies government was placing on citizens, and suggested that the federal government establish an authority to take over the employment of waterside workers (which was attacked by the government as an attempt to "socialise" the waterfront) and criticised the practice of disproportionately fining unionists compared to employers for industrial breaches. He was defeated by Hulme at a rematch at the following election in 1963.

Following his defeat, he went to work as a clerk for Patrick Stevedoring. He again unsuccessfully contested Petrie in 1966 and unsuccessfully sought Labor preselection for a Senate vacancy in 1967.

Parliament of Australia
Preceded by Alan Hulme	Member for Petrie; 1961 – 1963	Succeeded by Alan Hulme
