= David Nicholson (Australian politician) =

Australian politician

The Honourable Sir David Nicholson
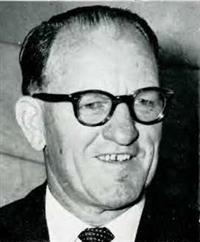

23rd Speaker of the Queensland Legislative Assembly
- In office 23 August 1960 – 25 May 1972
- Preceded by: Alan Fletcher
- Succeeded by: Bill Longeran

Member of the Queensland Legislative Assembly for Murrumba
- In office 29 May 1950 – 27 May 1972
- Preceded by: Frank Nicklin
- Succeeded by: Des Frawley

Personal details
- Born: David Eric Nicholson; 26 May 1904 Mikimiki, Masterton, New Zealand
- Died: 13 December 1997 (aged 93) Bribie Island, Queensland, Australia
- Party: Country Party
- Spouse: Cecile Flloyd Smith (m.1934 d.1987)
- Occupation: Company director

Sir David Eric Nicholson (26 May 1904 – 13 December 1997) was a member of the Queensland Legislative Assembly. He was the longest serving Speaker in the Parliament.

== Biography ==
Nicholson was born at Mikimiki, a short-lived sawmilling settlement ten miles north of Masterton, on the north island of New Zealand, the son of John Albert Nicholson and his wife Maria Mary (née Henderson). He was educated at the Masterton Public and High Schools and arrived in Australia in 1926 as a touring professional cycling representative and motorcycle stunt rider. Having competed successfully in three Australian states, Nicholson took up speedway racing at Maroubra and Penrith in New South Wales. In 1933 he became the first person in Australia to ride the infamous Wall of Death.

After he trained to be an electrical engineer, Nicholson arrived in Queensland and established a radio and refrigeration business in Caboolture. He was later appointed company director of the Kern Corporation and retired from business in 1955. Before he came to Australia, Nicholson was an excellent foot runner and bike rider and as a young man in western Queensland who "didn't mind a stoush" used to look forward to times when the boxing tent came to town so that he could show people of just what mettle he was made.

During World War II, Nicholson was a member of the Volunteer Defence Corps. He was stationed with the 6 Battalion Volunteer Defence Corps (Queensland) and was discharged in 1945 at the rank of Warrant Officer Class 2.

On 4 August 1934, shortly before arriving in Queensland, Nicholson married Cecile Flloyd Smith (died 1987) and together had two sons and two daughters. He died in December 1997 and was cremated at the Albany Creek Crematorium.

== Public career ==
Nicholson won the seat of Murrumba at the 1950 Queensland state election on a joint Country Party-Liberal Party ticket. Murrumba had been previously held by fellow Country Party member Frank Nicklin who had shifted to the new seat of Landsborough. He went on to represent the electorate for the next 22 years before retiring at the 1972 Queensland state election.

During his time in the parliament he served on several committees and from 1960 until 1972 he was Speaker of the house, the longest term as speaker in the history of the parliament. As Speaker, he would not tolerate any talking in the chamber and would tell the guilty parties if they wanted to continue talking they do it out in the corridors. Nor would he allow a member to read from a prepared speech in the parliament. The only people allowed to read from a speech were ministers when reading a Bill. He would watch carefully when any member was giving a speech to make sure they were not reading.

Another rule Nicholson enforced was repetitious speeches. He listened intently to each debate, making it impossible for speaker after speaker to rise and say the same thing. If there were some attempt at repetition, Sir David would point out that, if the speaker had nothing new to add to the debate, he or she should simply sit down.

He was knighted as a Knight Bachelor in 1972.

Parliament of Queensland
Preceded by Frank Nicklin	Member for Murrumba; 1950–1972	Succeeded by Des Frawley
