= Gary Johns =

Australian writer and politician (born 1952)

The Honourable Gary Johns
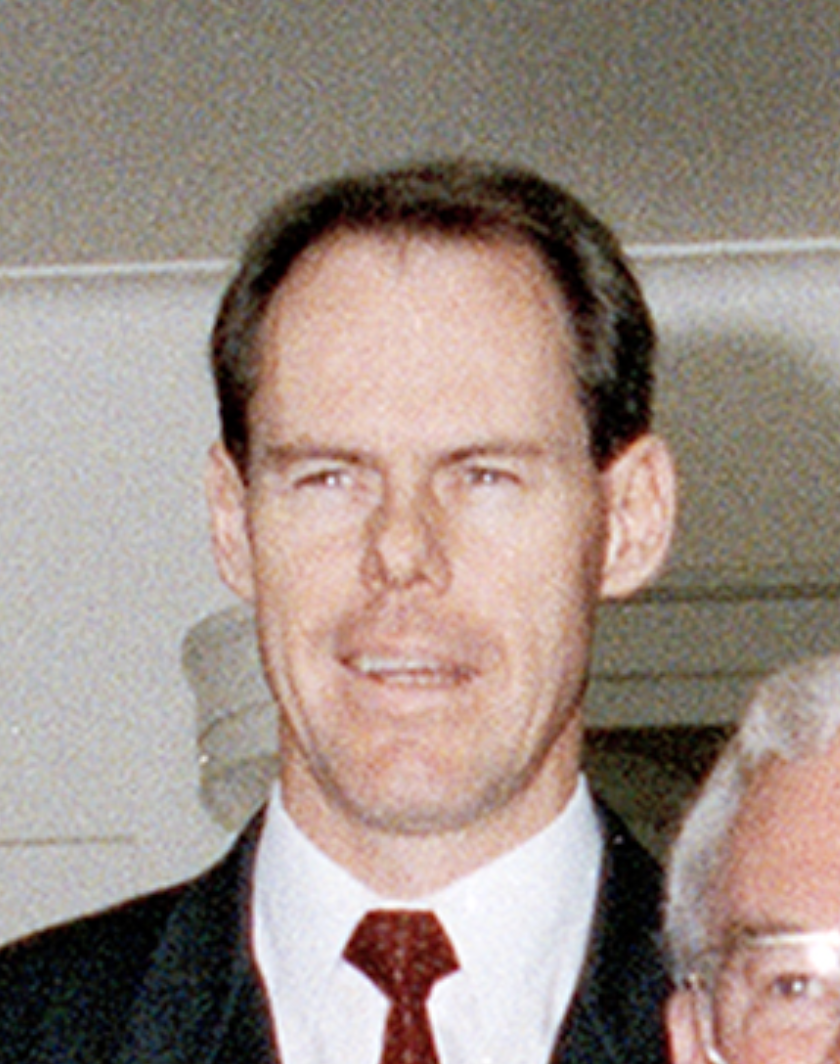
- Johns in 1994

Vice-President of the Executive Council
- In office 25 March 1994 – 11 March 1996
- Preceded by: Frank Walker
- Succeeded by: John Moore

Member of the Australian Parliament for Petrie
- In office 11 July 1987 – 2 March 1996
- Preceded by: John Hodges
- Succeeded by: Teresa Gambaro

Personal details
- Born: Gary Thomas Johns; 29 August 1952 (age 74) Melbourne, Victoria
- Party: Labor
- Education: Monash University
- Occupation: Writer

Gary Thomas Johns (born 29 August 1952) is an Australian writer and politician. He was a member of the House of Representatives from 1987 to 1996, holding the Queensland seat of Petrie for the Australian Labor Party (ALP). He served as a minister in the Keating government.

== Early life ==
Johns was born in Melbourne on 29 August 1952. He is the youngest of four sons born to Doris (née Thompson) and Claude Johns; his father was a painter and decorator. He holds a Bachelor of Economics and Master of Arts from Monash University and, later, a PhD from the University of Queensland. He tutored in geography at Melbourne State College.

== Political career ==
Johns joined the ALP in 1972. He worked as an organiser with the national secretariat of the ALP from 1978 to 1982, working under national secretaries David Combe and Bob McMullan.

Johns was elected as the member for Petrie in 1987, and held it for the Australian Labor Party until his defeat in 1996. He served as Assistant Minister for Industrial Relations from December 1993 and Special Minister of State and Vice-President of the Executive Council from March 1994 until the defeat of the Keating government in 1996, in which he lost his seat to Liberal candidate Teresa Gambaro.

== Later career ==
Since his defeat, Johns has drifted from the ALP and has been critical of his old party. Johns told Brett Evans that he might still be a member of the ALP but Evans says that in Johns' heart he has moved on from the ALP. Johns now describes himself as a "small-l liberal".

From 1997 to 2006, he was a senior fellow at the neo-liberal/conservative think tank the Institute of Public Affairs (IPA). He was head of the Non-Government Organisations unit within the IPA. From 2006 to 2009, Johns worked with a consultancy firm, ACIL Tasman. In 2009, he was appointed associate professor of Public Policy at the Australian Catholic University's Public Policy Institute. In 2012, he was appointed a visiting fellow at QUT Business School. He has been an adjunct professor at the University of Queensland. He was president of the Bennelong Society, an organisation that advocated the provision of welfare for Indigenous Australians under the same rules as for all other Australians. From 2002 to 2004, he was appointed Associate Commissioner of the Commonwealth Productivity Commission, an Australian government policy research and advisory body, with the responsibility for an inquiry into the national workers' compensation and occupational health and safety framework.

Johns was awarded a PhD in political science in 2001 from the University of Queensland, in 2002 the Fulbright Professional Award in Australian-United States Alliance Studies, Georgetown University in Washington D.C., and in 2003 the Centenary Medal for "service to Australian society through the advancement of economic, social and political issues".

He has been a columnist for The Australian newspaper and the author of numerous papers and books. He writes for The Spectator and Quadrant. His latest book is Public Health: an unhealthy conceit.

In 2017, Johns was appointed by the Turnbull government as the commissioner of the Australian Charities and Not-for-profits Commission. He resigned in June 2022 following the Albanese Government's election to office.

In 2023, Johns was chairman of Recognise a Better Way, a group arguing the "No" case regarding the Albanese government's proposal for an Indigenous Voice to Parliament. He then formed the research organisation Close the Gap Research, of which he is chairman.

== Bibliography ==
=== Books ===
- Waking up to Dreamtime: The illusion of Aboriginal self-determination. Singapore: Media Masters. 2001.
- Aboriginal Self-determination: The Whiteman's Dream. Connor Court, 2011.
- Right Social Justice. Edited essays, Connor Court, 2012.
- Really Dangerous Ideas. Edited essays, Connor Court, 2013.
- Recognize What? Edited essays, Connor Court, 2014.
- The Charity Ball. Connor Court, 2014.
- No Contraception, No Dole: Tackling Intergenerational Welfare. Connor Court, 2016.
- Throw Open the Doors: The World Health Organization Framework Convention on Tobacco Control. Connor Court, 2016.
- Your Body Belongs to the Nation & Other Public Health Lobby Errors. Connor Court, 2016.
- The Burden of Culture. Quadrant Books, 2022.
- Public Health: an unhealthy conceit. Co-author Samara McPhedran, Connor Court, 2026.
- Australian Apartheid: the aboriginalisation of a nation. Edited essays with David Barton, Quadrant, 2026

Political offices
Preceded by Frank Walker	Special Minister of State; 1994–1996	Succeeded by Nick Minchin
Preceded by Frank Walker	Vice-President of the Executive Council; 1994–1996	Succeeded by John Moore
Parliament of Australia
Preceded by John Hodges	Member for Petrie; 1987–1996	Succeeded by Teresa Gambaro
