= Marshall Cooke =

Australian politician (1938–2024)

Marshall Cooke KC
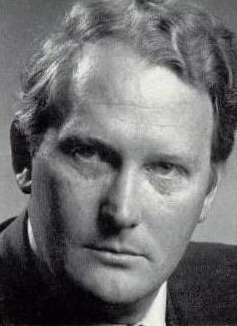

Member of the Australian Parliament for Petrie
- In office 2 December 1972 – 11 April 1974
- Preceded by: Alan Hulme
- Succeeded by: John Hodges

Personal details
- Born: 5 March 1938 Brisbane, Queensland, Australia
- Died: 16 July 2024 (aged 86)
- Party: Liberal
- Education: University of Queensland
- Profession: Barrister

Nelson Marshall Cooke KC (4 March 1938 – 16 July 2024) was an Australian lawyer and politician. He was a prominent barrister based in Brisbane and also served as a judge-advocate in the Royal Australian Naval Volunteer Reserve. He was a member of the House of Representatives from 1972 to 1974, representing the seat of Petrie for the Liberal Party.

== Early life ==
Cooke was born in Brisbane on 4 March 1938. He was the son of Philomena Mary (née Kenway) and Nelson Marshall Cooke. His parents ran a general store in Petrie.

Cooke completed the degrees of Bachelor of Arts and Bachelor of Laws at the University of Queensland. He was a champion debater and represented Queensland in water polo.

== Legal career ==
Cooke was called to the bar in 1962. He practised across a wide range of areas, including constitutional and administrative law, property law, planning and environmental law, commercial law, and criminal law. He was appointed Queen's Counsel in 1980 and served for periods as chairman of the Queensland Barristers' Admission Board and on the board of the faculty of the UQ Law School.

In 1989, Cooke was appointed by the Queensland state government led by National Party premier Mike Ahern to inquire into alleged corruption and misconduct in trade unions. The inquiry was modelled on the earlier Fitzgerald Inquiry into police corruption. Cooke delivered a total of six reports as part of the inquiry, recommending that criminal charges be laid against 21 members of the Federated Engine Drivers' and Firemen's Association and five members of the Federated Liquor and Allied Industries Employees' Union. The Cooke Inquiry was later assessed as a "transparent attempt to shift the focus away from Fitzgerald's findings about the government and onto allegations concerning Labor Party–linked unions". After Ahern lost the 1989 state election, the new Labor Party premier Wayne Goss reduced the resources and funding available to the inquiry Goss was later openly critical of Cooke's conduct of the inquiry and stated he had only discovered "a bit of corruption in two unions" at a cost of over $6 million.

In 1997, Cooke was admitted to practise law in Papua New Guinea. In the aftermath of the Sandline affair he appeared for PNG prime minister Julius Chan and his deputy Chris Haiveta in the commission of inquiry. He regularly appeared in the Supreme Court of Papua New Guinea, specialising in constitutional cases. In 2003, he was appointed by the national government as chief commissioner of an inquiry into the privatisation of the Papua New Guinea Banking Corporation and its sale to the Bank of South Pacific. The inquiry concluded after six months and found no evidence of wrongdoing, but suggested a better price could have been realised for the sale.

== Military service ==
Cooke was a long-serving officer in the Royal Australian Naval Volunteer Reserve, attaining the rank of commander and being granted the Reserve Force Decoration. He appeared as an advocate in military tribunals, courts-martials and inquiries, and later served as a judge-advocate and defence force magistrate. He was the head of the Naval Legal Panel until 1993.

== Politics ==
Cooke served on the Pine Rivers Shire Council in the 1960s. He was elected to the House of Representatives at the 1972 federal election, retaining the seat of Petrie for the Liberal Party following the retirement of the incumbent MP Alan Hulme.

In parliament, Cooke was a member of the Joint Standing Committee on the Australian Capital Territory from 1973 to 1974. In April 1974, he was defeated for Liberal preselection by John Hodges, who had been Cooke's campaign director in 1972. The Canberra Times reported that he had alienated Liberal Party officials by, among other things, opting for a silent telephone number.

== Personal life ==
Outside of his legal practice, Cooke served terms as chair and treasurer of the Queensland Swimming Association. He was also a life member of the Queensland Water Polo Association.

Cooke died on July 16, 2024, at the age of 86.

Parliament of Australia
Preceded by Alan Hulme	Member for Petrie; 1972 – 1974	Succeeded by John Hodges
