= Electoral district of Bancroft =

State electoral district of Queensland, Australia

Bancroft Queensland—Legislative Assembly
- Map of Bancroft, 2017
- State: Queensland
- Dates current: 2017–present
- MP: Chris Whiting
- Party: Labor Party
- Namesake: Joseph Bancroft
- Electors: 36,462 (2020)
- Area: 74 km^{2} (28.6 sq mi)
- Demographic: Outer-metropolitan
- Coordinates: 27.1932°S 153.009°E
Electorates around Bancroft:
Morayfield	Pumicestone	Pumicestone
Kurwongbah	Bancroft	Redcliffe
Murrumba	Murrumba	Murrumba

Bancroft is an electoral district of the Legislative Assembly in the Australian state of Queensland. It was created in the 2017 redistribution. It is named after pioneer doctor Joseph Bancroft.

Located in the City of Moreton Bay, Bancroft consists of the north and central sections of the existing electorate of Murrumba, including the suburbs of Burpengary East, Deception Bay, North Lakes and parts of the Narangba, Rothwell, Morayfield and Mango Hill suburbs.

== Members for Bancroft ==
Member	Party	Term
Chris Whiting	Labor	2017–present

== Election results ==
2024 Queensland state election: Bancroft
Party	Candidate	Votes	%	±%
Labor	Chris Whiting	16,141	46.86	−6.74
Liberal National	Rob Barridge	12,150	35.28	+6.92
One Nation	Matthew Langfield	2,605	7.57	−1.20
Greens	Gabrielle Unverzagt	2,499	7.26	+1.28
Independent	Barry Grant	1,046	3.04	−0.25
Total formal votes		34,441	96.24	−0.26
Informal votes		1,345	3.76	+0.26
Turnout		35,786	87.91	+1.71
Two-party-preferred result
Labor	Chris Whiting	19,289	56.01	−6.79
Liberal National	Rob Barridge	15,152	43.99	+6.79
Labor hold		Swing	-6.79	

== See also ==
- Electoral districts of Queensland
- Members of the Queensland Legislative Assembly by year
- Category:Members of the Queensland Legislative Assembly by name
