= Emma Comer =

Australian politician

Emma Comer MP
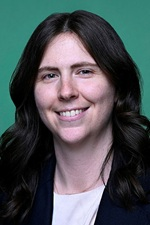

Member of the Australian Parliament for Petrie
- Incumbent
- Assumed office 3 May 2025
- Preceded by: Luke Howarth

Personal details
- Born: 13 October 1994 (age 31)
- Party: Labor
- Occupation: Politician
- Website: queenslandlabor.org/emma-comer/

Emma Comer (/ˈkoʊmər/ KOH-mər; born 13 October 1994) is an Australian politician from the Labor Party. She was elected a member of the Australian Parliament for the Division of Petrie after winning the seat in the 2025 Australian federal election. She is a member of the Labor Right.

== Career ==
She unseated Luke Howarth. He had held the seat of Petrie for 12 years.

=== High School and Immediate Post-school Period ===
She was an elected School Captain at Everton Park State High School in her senior year. After finishing high school, she went on to join the Army and commenced studies as a Staff Cadet at Royal Military College, Duntroon. She was under training from Jan 2013 to Jan 2014 until she became injured, and was discharged medically unfit for further service without completing the full course of training.

=== Work History Before Parliamentary Service ===
She worked in the office of Senator Anthony Chisholm.

Parliament of Australia
Preceded by Luke Howarth	Member for Petrie; 2025–present	Incumbent
