= Reg Gulley =

Australian politician

Member of the Queensland Legislative Assembly for Murrumba
- In office 24 March 2012 – 31 January 2015
- Preceded by: Dean Wells
- Succeeded by: Chris Whiting

Personal details
- Born: 1969 (age 56–57) Gayndah, Queensland
- Party: LNP
- Profession: Finance and education executive

Reg Gulley (born 1969) is an Australian Liberal National politician who was the member of the Legislative Assembly of Queensland for Murrumba from 2012 to 2015, having defeated Dean Wells at the 2012 state election. He studied Commerce at the University of Queensland and attended Cromwell College.

== Education ==
Gulley graduated in 1987 from Hervey Bay Senior College.

He studied for a Bachelor of Commerce from University of Queensland 1988–1990 and is a FCPA.

== Prior to Parliament ==
Before being elected in 2012, Gulley worked for more than 20 years as a commercial manager across both corporate and not-for-profit sectors. He held senior accounting roles in London, Sydney and Brisbane.

Parliament of Queensland
| Preceded by Dean Wells | Member for Murrumba; 2012–2015 | Succeeded by Chris Whiting |
