= Luke Howarth =

Australian politician (born 1972)

The Honourable Luke Howarth
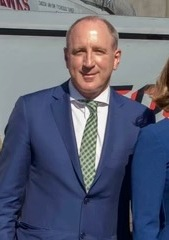
- Howarth in 2017

Assistant Minister for Youth and Employment Services
- In office 22 December 2020 – 23 May 2022

Assistant Minister for Community Housing, Homelessness and Community Services
- In office 29 May 2019 – 22 December 2020

Member of the Australian Parliament for Petrie
- In office 7 September 2013 – 3 May 2025
- Preceded by: Yvette D'Ath
- Succeeded by: Emma Comer

Personal details
- Born: 6 June 1972 (age 54) Brisbane, Queensland, Australia
- Party: LNP
- Occupation: Politician

Luke Ronald Howarth (born 6 June 1972) is an Australian former politician who was a member of the House of Representatives representing the Division of Petrie from his election in 2013 until his defeat at the 2025 federal election. He is a member of the Liberal National Party of Queensland and sat with the Liberal Party in federal parliament.

== Early life and education ==
Howarth was born in Brisbane, Queensland in 1972, to Ron and Denise Howarth, and grew up in Bracken Ridge. Howarth has one sister.

== Career ==
After leaving school, Howarth's first job was working at Barry Bull's Toombul Music. He worked at Sony Australia as a sales rep from 1993 to 2001. In 2002, Howarth joined his family's pest control business, alongside his mother, father and wife.

== Political career ==
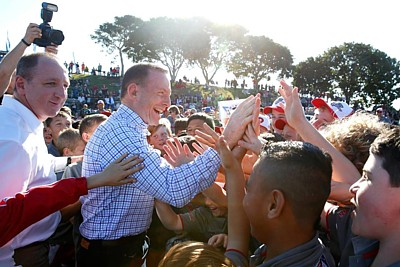
Luke Howarth and Prime Minister Tony Abbott with supporters of Redcliffe Dolphins rugby league club, August 2015

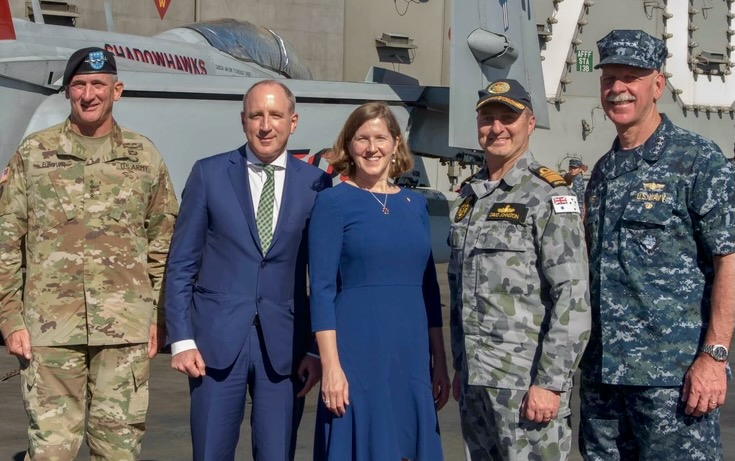
Luke Howarth aboard USS Ronald Reagan in 2017, alongside General Robert B. Brown, U.S. Consul General Valerie Fowler; Vice Admiral David Johnston and Admiral Scott H. Swift.

Howarth joined the Liberal National Party when he was 19 years old. In 2004, he ran in the Queensland state election in the electoral district of Sandgate against the incumbent Labor MP Gordon Nuttall, however was unsuccessful despite a 10% swing to him.

At the 2013 federal election, Howarth won the seat of Petrie by just 871 votes, which represented a 3.04% swing to his party, defeating the sitting ALP member, Yvette D'Ath, who had held the seat since the 2007 federal election.

Whilst campaigning for the 2016 federal election, Howarth claimed the Coalition Government had put nearly $1.5 billion into infrastructure in Petrie over previous three years. He was returned to government benches with a swing in his favour 1.12%. During this parliament he advocated for increased funding for the National School Chaplaincy Programme. He also played a key role in the leadership spill which removed Prime Minister Malcolm Turnbull from his position, in 2018.

During the 2019 election, Howarth enjoyed a significant swing in his favour, in line with other Liberal National Party candidates in Queensland, increasing his margin to 8.4%.

Returning to Canberra, Howarth was made Assistant Minister for Community Housing, Homelessness and Community Services. After speaking to ABC Radio National in his newly appointed role, Howarth came under fire for trying to "put a positive spin on [homelessness]." Howarth claimed that levels of homelessness had been reduced, over a 15 year period, from 8,926 people in 2001 to 8,200 people in 2016 despite a 20% increase in the population. The claim was challenged by some, who compared the number of rough sleepers at 6,810 in 2011 (a rate of 3.2 people per 10,000 of population) and risen by 20% to 8,200 (a rate of 3.5 per 10,000) by 2016. He was given the role of Assistant Minister for Youth and Employment Services later in that parliament, where he advocated for the Youth Jobs PaTH internship program.

In the 2022 Australian federal election Howarth won despite a 3.96% swing against him. However, as the coalition had lost power, Howarth joined the ranks of the opposition for the first time. He was appointed as the Shadow Minister for Defence Industry and the Shadow Minister for Defence Personnel by the new coalition leader, Peter Dutton. In this role he has been critical of the government's lack of urgency in developing Australia's defence industry given that Australia faces a geostrategic environment that is 'precarious and dangerous.'

Howarth is understood to have been a member of the National Right faction of the Liberal Party.

At the 2025 Australian federal election, Howarth was one of sixteen coalition MPs, and one of five Queensland coalition MPs to lose their seats. The party suffered a 5.6% swing against Howarth in Petrie, being defeated by Labor's Emma Comer.

== Personal life ==
Howarth married his wife, Louise, in 1999, and they have three sons.

Parliament of Australia
| Preceded by Yvette D'Ath | Member for Petrie; 2013–2025 | Succeeded by Emma Comer |
