= Joe Kruger (politician) =

Australian politician

Member of the Queensland Legislative Assembly for Murrumba
- In office 12 November 1977 – 1 November 1986
- Preceded by: Des Frawley
- Succeeded by: Dean Wells

Personal details
- Born: Raymond Charles Kruger; 28 February 1935 Kallangur, Queensland, Australia
- Died: 24 July 2003 (aged 68) Redcliffe, Queensland, Australia
- Party: Labor
- Spouse(s): Helen Margaret Brockhurst (m.1960), Hazel Jessie Harper (m.1992)
- Occupation: Farmer

Raymond Charles "Joe" Kruger (28 February 1935 – 24 July 2003) was a politician in Queensland, Australia. He was a Member of the Queensland Legislative Assembly.

== Politics ==
Joe Kruger was a member of the Pine Rivers Shire Council from 1973 to 1979.

Joe Kruger was elected to the Queensland Legislative Assembly for the Labor Party on 12 November 1977 in the electoral district of Murrumba. He was re-elected in the 1980 and 1983 elections. He was not pre-selected by the ALP for the 1986 election. He ran as an independent, but lost the seat to Dean Wells.

Parliament of Queensland
Preceded by Des Frawley	Member for Murrumba; 1977–1986	Succeeded by Dean Wells
