= Des Frawley =

Australian politician

Member of the Queensland Legislative Assembly for Murrumba
- In office 27 May 1972 – 12 November 1977
- Preceded by: David Nicholson
- Succeeded by: Joe Kruger

Member of the Queensland Legislative Assembly for Caboolture
- In office 12 November 1977 – 22 October 1983
- Preceded by: New seat
- Succeeded by: Bill Newton

Personal details
- Born: Desmond John Frawley; 23 September 1924 Brisbane, Queensland, Australia
- Died: 23 May 1996 (aged 71) Queensland, Australia
- Resting place: Redcliffe Cemetery
- Party: Country Party/National Party
- Spouse: Laurell Irene Orford (m.1944)
- Occupation: Company owner, Lift mechanic

Desmond John Frawley (23 September 1924 – 23 May 1996) was a company owner and member of the Queensland Legislative Assembly.

== Early days ==
Frawley was born in Brisbane, Queensland, to parents Stanley John Frawley and his wife Alice Mary (née Campbell). He attended Virginia State School, St Columban's College, and Brisbane Grammar School. Soon after leaving school he joined the RAAF where he served from 1942 to 1946. On his discharge he trained as an electrical mechanic under the Commonwealth Rehabilitation Scheme with the Public Works Department, Brisbane, for a period of three years. He then worked as a lift mechanic for 20 years with the Otis Elevator Company in Brisbane. Finally, he went into business and owned Frawley Motors for 20 years.

== Political career ==
Frawley, representing the Country Party (1972–74) (which became the National Party in 1974), won the seat of Murrumba in 1972. He held the seat until 1977 and then moved to the neighbouring seat of Caboolture which he held from 1977 to 1983.

He had previously been an alderman in the Redcliffe City Council from 1967 until 1972.

== Personal life ==
In 1944, Frawley married Laurell Irene Orford and together had three sons.

He was a life member of the Queensland Amateur Athletics Association, and member of the Redcliffe Trotting Club. He was patron of the Queensland Veterans Athletics Association and was Queensland decathlon champion 1949–52 and Queensland pentathlon champion 1951–52. In 1937, while a student at Virginia State School he won the coveted Norman Grehan Trophy for athletics.

He died in 1996 and was buried in Redcliffe Cemetery.

Parliament of Queensland
Preceded by David Nicholson	Member for Murrumba; 1972–1977	Succeeded by Joe Kruger
New seat	Member for Caboolture; 1977–1983	Succeeded by Bill Newton
