= Dean Wells (politician) =

Australian politician (born 1949)

The Honourable Dean Wells

Member of Parliament for Petrie
- In office 5 March 1983 – 1 December 1984
- Preceded by: John Hodges
- Succeeded by: John Hodges

Member of the Queensland Parliament for Murrumba
- In office 1 November 1986 – 24 March 2012
- Preceded by: Joe Kruger
- Succeeded by: Reg Gulley

Personal details
- Born: 13 January 1949 (age 77) Hiroshima, Japan
- Party: Labor
- Education: Monash University
- Profession: Lawyer, Lecturer, Barrister
- Website: romamitchellchambers.com.au/dean-wells/

Dean MacMillan Wells (born 13 January 1949) is an Australian politician. He was a Labor member of the Legislative Assembly of Queensland from 1986 to 2012 and was a Labor member of the Australian House of Representatives from 1983 to 1984.

Born of Australian parents in Hiroshima, Japan, he was educated at Monash University before becoming a lawyer. He obtained his Bachelor of Arts in 1972 before completing his Master of Arts in 1976. Finally in 1980, he obtained his Bachelor of Laws. Later, he was a lecturer in philosophy at the University of Queensland and an author and political commentator. In the autumn of 1981, he lectured at Saint David's University College, Lampeter in Wales.

In 1983, he was elected to the Australian House of Representatives as the Labor member for Petrie, defeating sitting Liberal member John Hodges. Hodges defeated Wells in 1984. In 1986, Wells was elected to the Legislative Assembly of Queensland as the member for Murrumba, and in 1989 was appointed Attorney-General, a position he held until 1995. He was appointed Minister for Justice and served this position between 1992 and 1995, while he also served as Minister for Arts. In 1998, he was appointed Minister for Education; in 2001 he was shifted to become Minister for the Environment, a position he held until 2004. He was defeated in the 2012 election by the Liberal National Party's Reg Gulley.

He was called to the Queensland Bar in 2009, and now practises as a barrister specialising in Criminal Law, Public/Administrative Law and Human Rights /Discrimination/Equal Opportunity Law. Since 2013, he has also been is part of the teaching staff part time at the Queensland University of Technology.

He is descended from the Wells family of Wallingford, Berkshire, through his Great Great Grandfather, John Deane Wells, lawyer, born Wallingford, 1808, arrived Melbourne on the Gloriana, December 1852, died Talbot, Victoria, 1863. He is a fifth generation Australian on all sides of the family. All his ancestors arrived in Australia in the gold rush of the 1850s.

Parliament of Australia
Preceded by John Hodges	Member for Petrie; 1983–1984	Succeeded by John Hodges
Parliament of Queensland
Preceded by Joe Kruger	Member for Murrumba; 1986–2012	Succeeded by Reg Gulley
