= Chris Whiting =

Australian politician

Chris Whiting MP

Queensland Government Chief Whip
- In office 16 February 2016 – 11 December 2017
- Premier: Annastacia Palaszczuk
- Preceded by: Mick de Brenni
- Succeeded by: Don Brown

Member of the Queensland Legislative Assembly for Bancroft
- Incumbent
- Assumed office 25 November 2017
- Preceded by: New seat

Member of the Queensland Legislative Assembly for Murrumba
- In office 31 January 2015 – 25 November 2017
- Preceded by: Reg Gulley
- Succeeded by: Steven Miles

Moreton Bay Regional Councillor for Division 2
- In office 15 March 2008 – 28 April 2012
- Preceded by: New Division
- Succeeded by: Peter Flannery

Personal details
- Born: 13 July 1966 (age 60) Mackay, Queensland
- Party: Australian Labor Party
- Education: University of Queensland
- Occupation: Media and communications officer, real estate agent
- Website: www.chriswhiting.com.au

Christopher Guy Whiting (born 13 July 1966) is an Australian politician. He has been the Australian Labor Party member for Bancroft in the Queensland Legislative Assembly since 2017, and previously represented Murrumba from 2015 to 2017.

== Early life ==
Whiting graduated from the University of Queensland with a Bachelor of Arts (Honours) and a Master of Journalism.

== Political career ==
Prior to being elected as a member of the Queensland Parliament, he represented Burpengary, Beachmere and Deception Bay for 12 years on the Caboolture Shire Council and then the Moreton Bay Regional Council. During his time as a councillor, he was at the forefront of the revitalisation of the Deception Bay foreshore, the implementation of traffic calming strategies in Deception Bay, and the initiation of the Burpengary Greenlinks park land project. In 2012, he unsuccessfully ran for the position of mayor of Moreton Bay Regional Council.

=== Member of Parliament ===
After his unsuccessful run for mayor, Whiting worked in real estate, before being preselected as the Labor candidate, at the 2015 state election, for the previously safe Labor seat of Murrumba, which Labor had lost in the 2012 state election. He was successful and became a member of the 55th Queensland Parliament. Following an electoral redistribution, Whiting chose to run for the notionally safe Labor seat of Bancroft at the 2017 election.

In the current Parliament (the 58th Parliament), he is Deputy Chair of the Governance, Energy and Finance Committee. In the previous term (the 57th Parliament), he was the Chair of the State Development and Regional Industries Committee, and had previously served as Chief Government Whip.

Parliament of Queensland
Preceded by Reg Gulley	Member for Murrumba; 2015–2017	Succeeded by Steven Miles
New seat	Member for Bancroft; 2017–present	Incumbent
