= Terry Gygar =

Australian politician (1947–2024)

Terry Gygar RFD

Member of the Queensland Legislative Assembly for Stafford
- In office 7 December 1974 – 22 October 1983
- Preceded by: Roy Harvey
- Succeeded by: Denis Murphy
- In office 4 August 1984 – 22 December 1989
- Preceded by: Denis Murphy
- Succeeded by: Rod Welford

Personal details
- Born: Terence Joseph Gygar; 21 October 1947 Tamworth, New South Wales, Australia
- Died: 15 March 2024 (aged 76)
- Party: Liberal Party
- Education: University of Queensland, Bond University, London School of Economics and Political Science, East China University of Political Science and Law
- Occupation: Soldier, calligraphist, Professor

Terence Joseph "Terry" Gygar, RFD (21 October 1947 – 15 March 2024) was an Australian academic, member of the Queensland Parliament, and former Army officer who served in Vietnam.

Gygar was the member for Stafford in the Queensland Parliament, representing the Liberal Party, from 1974 until 1983, and again from 1984 to 1989. During that time he held various shadow portfolios. During his time in parliament he was awarded the Chevening scholarship for study at the London School of Economics.

Following his Parliamentary service Gygar completed a Bachelor of Laws with Honours from Bond University. He was a barrister at the Supreme Court of Queensland, the High Court of Australia and the Federal Court of Australia. He taught at Bond University starting in 1992 and was a foundation member of the Asia Pacific Law Deans' Association.

In recognition of his services to the Australian Defence Force, governance, education and the law, the Australian Government awarded Gygar the Australian Active Service Medal, General Service Medal for Vietnam, the Queen Elizabeth II Silver Jubilee Medal, the Australian Centenary Medal, the Reserve Force Decoration and the National Medal and Australian Defence Medal.

Gygar died on 15 March 2024. Bond University's flags flew at half mast on 18 March 2024 as a mark of respect.

Parliament of Queensland
Preceded by Roy Harvey	Member for Stafford; 1974–1983	Succeeded by Denis Murphy
Preceded by Denis Murphy	Member for Stafford; 1984–1989	Succeeded by Rod Welford
