= Denis Murphy (Australian politician) =

Australian politician (1936–1984)

Dr. Denis Murphy

Member of the Queensland Legislative Assembly for Stafford
- In office 22 October 1983 – 21 June 1984
- Preceded by: Terry Gygar
- Succeeded by: Terry Gygar

Personal details
- Born: Denis Joseph Murphy; 6 August 1936 Nambour, Queensland, Australia
- Died: 21 June 1984 (aged 47) Brisbane, Queensland, Australia
- Resting place: Mooloolah Cemetery
- Party: Labor
- Spouse: Gwendoline May Butcher (m.1959)
- Education: University of Queensland, Duke University
- Occupation: Academic, Historian, School teacher

Denis Joseph Murphy (6 August 1936 – 21 June 1984) was an Australian Labor Party politician, historian and biographer. Born in Nambour, Queensland, Murphy was the youngest of nine children and went to an all boys Catholic school, St Joseph's Nudgee College. After graduating, he went on to study high school PE teaching and later became an educator at Redcliffe State High School. As Murphy worked he went back to university and completed his master's degree in Queensland's state enterprises in 1965 at the University of Queensland. In 1966 he left his job as a PE teacher and took on a full-time position as a lecturer at the University of Queensland. He taught there as an academic historian and wrote primarily on the history of the Australian Labor Party.

Murphy became a member of the Australian Labor Party in 1967. During the 1970s, Murphy led a push for party reform, alongside Peter Beattie and Manfred Cross. He maintained his position at University of Queensland whilst he pushed for reform and completed biographies on a number of Queensland ALP figures, notably Thomas J. Ryan and Bill Hayden. In 1980 he became the State Branch President and was subsequently elected to the Parliament of Queensland for the electorate of Stafford at the 1983 state election.

Murphy was diagnosed with cancer in 1983 and died in 1984, aged 47. He died before having the opportunity to make a speech as a Member of Parliament. Peter Beattie made a speech instead for Murphy and led a conference of over 200 delegates in a moment of silence in honour of Murphy's life. Murphy died in Brisbane, Queensland and is buried in Mooloolah Cemetery.

== Early life ==
Denis Murphy was born in Nambour, Queensland in 1936. His parents were Martin Murphy and Lilian May, née Campbell. He was the youngest of eight children and went to an all boys Catholic school, St Joseph's Nudgee College. Costar and Saunders (2011) report that "Murphy excelled academically and athletically, most notably in Cricket". In 1955, Murphy went on to study high school Physical Education (PE) teaching at Queensland Teachers' Training College. The next year he began teaching at Nundah State School.

Murphy married Gwendoline May Butcher in 1959 and one year later went on to teach in the United Kingdom coaching a senior cricket team until he returned to Brisbane in 1961. Upon his return, Murphy taught at Redcliffe State High School and then left this position in 1965. During his time at Redcliffe State High School, he worked at night doing furniture removals and at one point worked as a railway clerk. As well as PE, Murphy also taught mathematics and English. At 28 years old (1964) he joined the Australian Labor Party. In 1965 he became President of the Young Labor Association of Queensland and held the position until 1967.

While working as a teacher Murphy began studying part-time at the University of Queensland, completing a Bachelor of Arts in 1964 and then a PhD in 1972. Murphy's doctoral thesis was an analysis of the career of T. J. Ryan, former Premier of Queensland. The University of Queensland Press later published it as T.J. Ryan : a political biography (1975). In 1966 he left his job as a PE teacher and took on a full-time position at the University of Queensland.

== Career ==
In 1966, Denis Murphy began his career as a tertiary educator and worked at the University of Queensland (UQ) as a tutor in Australian History. Costar and Saunders note that Murphy acquired this position after "completing a masters' qualifying thesis on Queensland's state enterprises". Two years later, as Murphy became increasingly active in the Australian Labor Party (ALP), he subsequently joined the Queensland Central Executive. He was employed by the University of Queensland History Department until 1984. During his time there he published two biographies on Labor politicians as well as five books with which he edited and wrote in collaboration with other tertiary academics. Before his rise in politics, he was an academic historian and researched extensively in Australian History. After working as a tutor in history at UQ for 3 years, Murphy later rose to senior tutor and then in 1975 became a senior lecturer. Bradley Bowden attributes Murphy's rise to his heavy involvement in the Australian Labor Party as he received access to archives by the State Secretary at the time, Tom Burns. Murphy wrote a number of biographies including thirteen submissions to the Australian Dictionary of Biography. He became the Chair of the ADB's Queensland Working Party in 1974.

Whilst at UQ, Murphy oversaw an increase in learning opportunities within the history department as enrolments were raised 96 to 870 in 3 years by his efforts. This, however, had a negative impact on his written works as Murphy increased his teaching workload due to a lack of staff needed to support the increase in students. Bradley Bowden recounts that, during this period, Murphy was also Chair of the Departmental Assembly at UQ as well as Queensland Central Executive member and "Labor's candidate in the 1972 federal election". This summation of roles resulted in Murphy's political theses to become underdeveloped and less respected by other academics. Critics scrutinised Murphy's publications at one point due to an "absence of theory... and providing syntheses of the work of others without checking its veracity".

Throughout his time as an historian, Murphy began a push for party reform within the Australian Labor Party's Queensland branch. In 1978 Murphy presented a speech for over 300 party members and critiqued the capabilities of the current Queensland Central Executive leaders. The majority ruled in favor of Murphy's recommendation for a shift in the party and he was named the leader of a new reform team. During this time Murphy led a push for a restructure in the ALP and attained a pilots license in order to fly statewide to share his message. Anthony Albanese, the 2021 Leader of the Australian Labor Party states that Murphy led reforms in "affirmative action along with a new pre-selection procedure providing branch pre-selection (which was) reviewed by a 40 person electoral college." A story in the Sydney Morning Herald stated that "Murphy believes that the reforms he is seeking are the only way future historians will be able to talk about Labor in Power''.

In 1981 he was elected the President of the Queensland State Labor Party. Albanese claims that Murphy positioned the ALP to overcome the problems caused by Joh Bjelke-Petersen, the conservative premier at the time. Murphy published an article titled Queensland's Image and Australian Nationalism (1978), in which he criticized the premier stating, "Mr. Bjelke Petersen... is one of the less stable and less competent Premiers the state has had". In 1980, Murphy wrote Labor in Power, which received negative responses particularly from Bede Nairn, another Labor Party Historian, "attacked the book's uncritical discussions of Labor and its affiliated unions". Despite criticisms and any negative responses to Murphy's political engagements, in 1983 he won the position of The State Seat of Stafford in the State Election.

== Death ==
Not long after his election into the Liberal Seat of Stafford in 1983, Denis Murphy was diagnosed with an unspecified cancer and was ill for eight months before he died on the 21st of June 1984. He did not live to give his maiden speech and the speech was instead given by Mr. Peter Beattie. The Sydney Morning Herald reports that in Mr Beattie's speech he said "As a close personal friend of Denis Murphy I want to pay strongest possible tribute to him on behalf of the Labor Movement and the people of Queensland." After Beattie's speech, over 200 delegates attending the conference stood together and bowed their heads in a minutes silence to pay respects to Murphy.

=== Legacy ===
After Murphy's death, a number of tributes were made to commemorate his life and the work that he did during his time as an historian and Labor Politician. The Journal of the Royal Historical Society of Queensland wrote a tribute paper for him titled Tropical Transformations: Denis Murphy in Queensland History. The dedication was co-authored by a number of Murphy's former colleagues at the University of Queensland such as Kay Saunders, Murray Johnson and Brian Costar. An obituary for Murphy was written by Roger Joyce in 1984 and published by the Australian Society for the Study of Labour History. Roger Joyce was a professor at the University of Queensland and oversaw Murphy's PhD on T.J Ryan when Denis was still a student. Joyce states in the obituary that "Denis was one of the best examples of the "fire in the belly" school of historians." In 2014, 30 years after Murphy's death, Anthony Albanese made a speech on the power of communities and based his discussion on the life of Denis Murphy. Albanese spoke highly of Murphy in his speech and stated that "Denis was one of Queensland Labor's greatest leaders."

== Written works ==
- Prelude to Power: The Rise of the Labour Party in Queensland 1885-1915 (1970)
- T.J. Ryan: A Political Biography (1975)
- Labour In Politics (1975)
- Queensland Political Portraits 1859-1965 (1978)
- Ken Laidlaw: A White Collar Union Leader (1979)
- Labour in Power: The Labour Party and Governments in Queensland (1980)
- Hayden: A Political Biography (1980)
- The Big Strikes: Queensland 1889-1965 (1983)

== Memorial lecture series ==
A lecture series in honour of Murphy was established. Lectures in the series have included the following:

Order	Year	Speaker	Lecture name	Ref
1st	1987			
2nd	1988			
3rd	1989	Terry Hampson	One minute to midnight	
4th	1990			
5th	1991	John Kerin		
6th	1992	Peter Beattie	A reformist party in government: the courage needed for reform	
7th	1993	Barry Jones	The agenda for the 1990s	
8th	1994			
9th	1995			
10th	1996	Gareth Evans	Change with Security: Revitalising the Labor Tradition	
11th	1997			
12th	1998			
13th	1999			
14th	1999			
15th	2000			
16th	2001			
17th	2002			
18th	2003			
19th	2004			
20th	2005			
21st	2006			
22nd	2007			

2014: 24th Lecture. Anthony AlbaneseDenis Murphy and the power of communities
2015: 25th Lecture. Douglas Cameron, Senator for NSW, 22 August.
2016: 26th Lecture. Sam Dastyari, Senator for NSW.
2017: Linda Burney, MP. 21 October.
2025: Murray Watt

== See also ==
- D.J. Murphy, 1975, T.J. Ryan: a political biography, St Lucia, Brisbane: University of Queensland Press.
- Denis Murphy, 1980, Hayden: a political biography, Sydney: Angus and Robertson.
- Bradley Bowden, 2016, "Denis Murphy, the University of Queensland and Labour History, 1966-83, A Reassessment," Labour History, No 110 (May 2016), pp. 125–142.

Parliament of Queensland
Preceded by Terry Gygar	Member for Stafford; 1983–1984	Succeeded by Terry Gygar
