= Electoral district of Murrumba =

State electoral district of Queensland, Australia

Murrumba Queensland—Legislative Assembly
- Electoral map of Murrumba 2017
- State: Queensland
- MP: Steven Miles
- Party: Labor
- Namesake: An Aboriginal word meaning "good"
- Electors: 41,071 (2020)
- Area: 63 km^{2} (24.3 sq mi)
- Demographic: Outer-metropolitan
- Coordinates: 27°12′S 153°2′E
Electorates around Murrumba:
Kurwongbah	Bancroft	Moreton Bay
Pine Rivers	Murrumba	Redcliffe
Aspley	Sandgate	Moreton Bay

Murrumba is an electoral district of the Legislative Assembly in the Australian state of Queensland.

The district is based in the outer northern suburbs of Brisbane. It includes the suburbs of Deception Bay, Kippa-Ring, Murrumba Downs and Rothwell. The electorate was first contested in 1912.

== Members for Murrumba ==
Member	Party	Term
James Forsyth	Liberal	1912–1918
Richard Warren	Country	1918–1932
Frank Nicklin	Country	1932–1950
David Nicholson	Country	1950–1972
Des Frawley	Country	1972–1974
Des Frawley	National	1974–1977
Joe Kruger	Labor	1977–1986
Dean Wells	Labor	1986–2012
Reg Gulley	Liberal National	2012–2015
Chris Whiting	Labor	2015–2017
Steven Miles	Labor	2017–present

== Election results ==
2024 Queensland state election: Murrumba
Party	Candidate	Votes	%	±%
Labor	Steven Miles	19,076	47.67	−2.87
Liberal National	Gary Fulton	12,310	30.76	+1.76
Greens	Deklan Green	2,534	6.33	−1.87
Legalise Cannabis	David Zaloudek	2,116	5.29	+5.29
One Nation	Duncan Geldenhuys	1,727	4.32	−3.18
Independent	Sarah Kropman	905	2.26	+2.26
Family First	David Todd	846	2.11	+2.11
Independent DLP	Scott Donovan	314	0.78	+0.78
Independent	Caleb Wells	191	0.48	+0.48
Total formal votes		40,019	96.25	
Informal votes		1,560	3.75	
Turnout		41,579	88.53	
Two-party-preferred result
Labor	Steven Miles	23,922	59.78	−1.62
Liberal National	Gary Fulton	16,097	40.22	+1.62
Labor hold		Swing	-1.62	
